= 2011–12 Longwood Lancers men's basketball team =

American college basketball season

2011–12 Longwood Lancers men's basketball
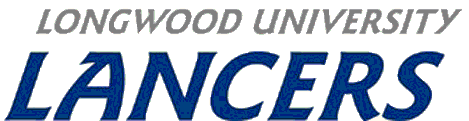
- Conference: Independent
- Record: 10–21
- Head coach: Mike Gillian (9th season)
- Assistant coaches: Doug Thibault (9th season); Tim Fudd (5th season); Ricky Yahn (1st season)
- Home arena: Willett Hall

2011–12 NCAA Division I men's basketball independents standings
| | Conf. | | | | Overall |
| Team | W | | L | PCT | W | | L | PCT |
|---|---|---|---|---|---|---|---|---|
| Cal State Bakersfield | | – | | – | 16 | – | 15 | .516 |
| Seattle | | – | | – | 12 | – | 15 | .444 |
| Nebraska–Omaha | | – | | – | 11 | – | 18 | .379 |
| Longwood | | – | | – | 10 | – | 21 | .323 |
Rankings from AP Poll

The 2011–12 Longwood Lancers men's basketball team represented Longwood University during the 2011–12 NCAA Division I men's basketball season. The team was led by ninth-year head coach Mike Gillian, and played their home games at Willett Hall as a Division I independent school. This was their final season as an independent school; on January 24, 2012, the Big South Conference formally added Longwood as their twelfth member, to begin with the 2012–13 season.

== Last season ==
The Lancers had a record of 12–19.

== Roster ==
2011–12 Longwood Lancers men's basketball team
Players
Coaches

| Pos. | # | Name | Height | Weight | Year | Previous school | Hometown |
|---|---|---|---|---|---|---|---|
| G | 1 | Jeremiah Bowman | 6 ft 2 in (1.88 m) | 188 lb (85 kg) | Sr | Middleburg/Harcum | Washington, DC |
| G | 2 | Martiz Washington | 6 ft 0 in (1.83 m) | 175 lb (79 kg) | Sr | Christchurch | Hopewell, VA |
| G | 3 | Anthony Taylor | 6 ft 2 in (1.88 m) | 205 lb (93 kg) | RS Fr | Egg Harbor Township | Egg Harbor Township, NJ |
| C | 4 | Antwan Carter | 6 ft 6 in (1.98 m) | 225 lb (102 kg) | Sr | St. Petersburg | St. Petersburg, FL |
| G | 10 | Stephen Shockley | 6 ft 0 in (1.83 m) | 185 lb (84 kg) | Jr | Heritage High School | Leesburg, VA |
| G | 12 | Tristan Carey | 6 ft 4 in (1.93 m) | 185 lb (84 kg) | RS So | Colonial Beach/La Salle | Colonial Beach, VA |
| G | 13 | David Robinson | 6 ft 4 in (1.93 m) | 190 lb (86 kg) | So | Cosby | Chesterfield, VA |
| G/F | 21 | Mark Parker | 6 ft 7 in (2.01 m) | 202 lb (92 kg) | So | West Johnston | Clayton, NC |
| F | 22 | Jeylani Dublin | 6 ft 6 in (1.98 m) | 218 lb (99 kg) | So | Millbrook | Brooklyn, NY |
| F | 33 | Jan van der Kooij | 6 ft 7 in (2.01 m) | 225 lb (102 kg) | Sr | Roelof van Echten | Tiendeveen, NL |
| F | 44 | Jeff Havenstein | 6 ft 8 in (2.03 m) | 227 lb (103 kg) | So | Linganore | Mt. Airy, MD |

Head coach

- Mike Gillian (North Adams State)

Assistant coach(es)

- Doug Thibault (Boise State)
- Tim Fudd (American)
- Ricky Yahn (Wheeling Jesuit)

Legend

- (C) Team captain
- (S) Suspended
- (I) Ineligible
- (W) Walk-on
- Injured
- Current redshirt

Roster
Last update: 10 December 2014

== Schedule ==
| Date time, TV | Opponent | Result | Record | Site (attendance) city, state |
Regular season
| November 11*; 7:00 pm | Navy | L 70–78 | 0–1 | Willett Hall (1,779); Farmville, VA |
| November 13*; 4:30 pm | Virginia Intermont | W 91–73 | 1–1 | Willett Hall (1,013); Farmville, VA |
| November 15*; 7:00 pm, FCS/MASN | Canisius | L 83–87 | 1–2 | Willett Hall (1,365); Farmville, VA |
| November 18*; 9:00 pm, BYUtv | at BYU; Chicago Invitational Challenge | L 60–92 | 1–3 | Marriott Center (10,179); Provo, UT |
| November 22*; 10:00 pm | at Nevada; Chicago Invitational Challenge | L 78–80 | 1–4 | Marriott Center (2,656); Provo, NV |
| November 25*; 1:00 pm | vs. Prairie View A&M; Chicago Invitational Challenge | W 70–67 | 2–4 | Sears Centre Arena (200); Hoffman Estates, IL |
| November 26*; 3:00 pm | vs. UMKC; Chicago Invitational Challenge | L 53–93 | 2–5 | Sears Centre Arena (200); Hoffman Estates, IL |
| December 2*; 7:00 pm | South Carolina State | W 92–81 | 3–5 | Willett Hall (1,022); Farmville, VA |
| December 3*; 1:00 pm | at Virginia | L 53–86 | 3–6 | John Paul Jones Arena (8,352); Charlottesville, VA |
| December 12*; 7:00 pm | VMI | W 110–89 | 4–6 | Willett Hall (324); Farmville, VA |
| December 19*; 8:00 pm | at Vanderbilt | L 71–99 | 4–7 | Memorial Gymnasium (12,886); Nashville, TN |
| December 23*; 7:00 pm, FCS | Seton Hall | L 61–87 | 4–8 | Willett Hall (773); Farmville, VA |
| December 29*; 7:00 pm | at Chattanooga; Dr. Pepper Classic | L 50–85 | 4–9 | McKenzie Arena (2,527); Chattanooga, TN |
| December 30*; 4:30 pm | vs. Hampton; Dr. Pepper Classic | L 79–82 | 4–10 | McKenzie Arena (200); Chattanooga, TN |
| January 3*; 7:00 pm | at Army | L 77–96 | 4–11 | Christl Arena (504); West Point, NY |
| January 7*; 2:00 pm | NJIT | W 85–70 | 5–11 | Willett Hall (517); Farmville, VA |
| January 11*; 7:00 pm | at Brown | W 79–77 | 6–11 | Pizzitola Sports Center (698); Providence, RI |
| January 14*; 2:00 pm | at Dartmouth | L 67–83 | 6–12 | Leede Arena (887); Hanover, NH |
| January 16*; 2:00 pm | at Fairleigh Dickinson | W 87–83 | 7–12 | Rothman Center (326); Hackensack, NJ |
| January 22*; 2:00 pm | at Eastern Kentucky | L 71–78 | 7–13 | Alumni Coliseum (1,250); Richmond, KY |
| January 24*; 7:05 pm | at Florida Gulf Coast | L 58–101 | 7–14 | Alico Arena (1,625); Fort Myers, FL |
| February 2*; 7:00 pm | Southern Virginia | W 103–84 | 8–14 | Willett Hall (1,302); Farmville, VA |
| February 6*; 7:30 pm | at South Carolina State | L 58–74 | 8–15 | SHM Memorial Center (789); Orangeburg, SC |
| February 11*; 2:00 pm | Seattle | L 99–100 ^{OT} | 8–16 | Willett Hall (1,412); Farmville, VA |
| February 15*; 7:00 pm | Washington Adventist | W 90–88 | 9–16 | Willett Hall (1,365); Farmville, VA |
| February 18*; 2:00 pm | North Dakota | L 59–67 | 9–17 | Willett Hall (718); Farmville, VA |
| February 20*; 7:00 pm | at Norfolk State | L 52–66 | 9–18 | Joseph G. Echols Memorial Hall (1,725); Norfolk, VA |
| February 22*; 7:00 pm | Virginia Wise | W 85–74 | 10–18 | Willett Hall (1,222); Farmville, VA |
| February 25*; 2:00 pm | at NJIT | L 51–94 | 10–19 | Fleisher Center (492); Newark, NJ |
| February 27*; 9:00 pm, ROOT | at Gonzaga | L 60–92 | 10–20 | McCarthey Athletic Center (6,000); Spokane, WA |
| February 29*; 10:10 pm | at Seattle | L 74–111 | 10–21 | KeyArena at Seattle Center (2,311); Seattle, WA |
*Non-conference game. (#) Tournament seedings in parentheses. All times are in Eastern Time.
