= 2012 Pac-12 Conference men's basketball tournament =

- Classification: Division I
- Season: 2011–12
- Site: Staples Center; Los Angeles, California
- Champions: Colorado (1st title)
- Winning coach: Tad Boyle (1st title)
- MVP: Carlon Brown (Colorado)
- Attendance: 63,414 (total); 11,197 (Championship game)
- Top scorer: André Roberson (Colorado) (59 pts)
- Television: CBS, FSN

2011–12 Pac-12 Conference men's basketball standings
	Conf.				Overall
Team	W		L	PCT	W		L	PCT
Washington	14	–	4	.778	24	–	11	.686
California	13	–	5	.722	24	–	10	.706
Oregon	13	–	5	.722	24	–	10	.706
Arizona	12	–	6	.667	23	–	12	.657
Colorado †	11	–	7	.611	24	–	12	.667
UCLA	11	–	7	.611	19	–	14	.576
Stanford	10	–	8	.556	26	–	11	.703
Oregon State	7	–	11	.389	21	–	15	.583
Washington State	7	–	11	.389	19	–	18	.514
Arizona State	6	–	12	.333	10	–	21	.323
Utah	3	–	15	.167	6	–	25	.194
USC	1	–	17	.056	6	–	26	.188
† Conference tournament winner As of March 8, 2012; Rankings from AP poll

The 2012 Pacific Life Pac-12 Conference men's basketball tournament was played on March 7–10, 2012 at Staples Center in Los Angeles, California. The tournament champion became the NCAA tournament automatic qualifier from the conference. The pairings will be announced following the completion of the regular season on March 4, 2012. The first three rounds was all broadcast on FSN with the championship game on CBS. The Pac-12 announced, on March 1, that Men's and Women's tournament games that were not televised would be streamed on YouTube. Also streamed live on YouTube was a post-game press conferences for the semifinals and championship games. In its first season in the Pac-12, No. 6 seeded Colorado defeated No. 4 seeded Arizona 53–51 for the title and the automatic bid to the NCAA National Championship Tournament. Colorado (along with USC in 2009) has been the lowest seeded team ever to win in this tournament's history. Colorado also was the first team ever to win four games to become the champion of this tournament (because the 6th seed plays in the first of four rounds).

== Seeds ==
Teams was seeded by conference record, with a tiebreaker system used to seed teams with identical conference records.

== Schedule ==
Session	Game	Time*	Matchup^{#}	Final Score	Television	Attendance
First Round – Wednesday, March 7
1	1	12:10 PM	#8 Washington State vs #9 Oregon State	64–69	FSN	5,973
1	2	2:40 PM	#5 UCLA vs #12 USC	55–40	FSN	5,973
2	3	6:10 PM	#7 Stanford vs #10 Arizona State	85–65	FSN	6,747
2	4	8:40 PM	#6 Colorado vs #11 Utah	53–41	FSN	6,747
Quarterfinals – Thursday, March 8
3	5	12:10 PM	#1 Washington vs. #9 Oregon State	84–86	FSN	8,780
3	6	2:40 PM	#4 Arizona vs. #5 UCLA	66–58	FSN	8,780
4	7	6:10 PM	#2 California vs. #7 Stanford	77–71	FSN	9,317
4	8	8:40 PM	#3 Oregon vs. #6 Colorado	62–63	FSN	9,317
Semifinals – Friday, March 9
5	9	6:10 PM	#9 Oregon State vs. #4 Arizona	61–72	FSN	11,615
5	10	8:40 PM	#2 California vs. #6 Colorado	59–70	FSN	11,615
Championship Game – Saturday, March 10
6	11	3:10 PM	#4 Arizona vs. #6 Colorado	51–53	CBS	11,197
*Game Times in PT. #-Rankings denote tournament seeding.

== Bracket ==
First round March 7, 2012
8	Washington State	64
9	Oregon State	69
5	UCLA	55
12	USC	40
7	Stanford	85
10	Arizona State	65
6	Colorado	53
11	Utah	41

Quarterfinals; March 8, 2012
1	Washington	84
9	Oregon State	86
4	Arizona	66
5	UCLA	58
2	California	77
7	Stanford	71
3	Oregon	62
6	Colorado	63

Semifinals; March 9, 2012
9	Oregon State	61
4	Arizona	72
2	California	59
6	Colorado	70

Championship Game; March 10, 2012
4	Arizona	51
6	Colorado	53

== Tournament notes ==
- This was the first tournament ever held under the "Pac-12" name, after Colorado and Utah joined the conference on July 1, 2011.
- March 7, 2012 – Josiah Turner of Arizona was suspended indefinitely from the basketball team for a violation of team rules, announced by head coach Sean Miller.
- This was the lowest-scoring game for both teams in a tournament championship game.
- Colorado got the automatic bid to the 2012 NCAA men's Division I basketball tournament, with California getting an at-large bid.
- Arizona beat Oregon State for the 6th time in Pac-10/12 tournament history, the most wins any university has over any other, (Arizona is now 6-0 all time vs. OSU in the tournament).
- Stanford and ASU combined for 26 3-pt. field goals which set a current tournament record (15 and 11).
- Oregon State and Washington combined for a record game low % of free throws made, only 49.2% (29 of 59) (OSU was 17 of 32; UW was 12 of 27).
- In the Colorado vs. Arizona game, there were only 12 assists (6 for each team), a record game low for a combined total.
- Austin Dufault of Colorado had 15 personal fouls throughout the tournament (4 games) setting a Pac-12 Tournament record.
- André Roberson of Colorado had a record 41 rebounds (4 games) for one tournament.
- Washington, Arizona, Stanford, and Oregon were invited to the 2012 National Invitation Tournament. Stanford was the N.I.T. champion.
- Washington State and Oregon State were invited to the 2012 College Basketball Invitational.
- This was the first time since 1958 that a Pac-12 regular season conference champion was not selected for the NCAA tournament.

== All-Tournament Team ==
- Carlon Brown, Colorado
- Jared Cunningham, Oregon State (2nd time, 2011)
- Kyle Fogg, Arizona
- Solomon Hill, Arizona
- Jesse Perry, Arizona
- André Roberson, Colorado

== Most Outstanding Player ==
- Carlon Brown, Colorado

== 2012 Hall of Honor inductees ==
The induction ceremony took place on Saturday, March 10 during the Pac-12 Hall of Honor breakfast. Inductees were:

- Richard Jefferson (Arizona)
- Kurt Nimphius (Arizona State)
- Lamond Murray (California)
- Burdette Haldorson (Colorado)
- Jim Barnett (Oregon)
- A.C. Green (Oregon State)
- George Selleck (Stanford)
- Ed O'Bannon (UCLA)
- Sam Barry (Coach) (USC)
- Arnie Ferrin (Utah)
- George Irvine (Washington)
- Steve Puidokas (Washington State)

== See also ==
- 2012 NCAA Men's Division I Basketball Tournament
