= 2011–12 Oregon State Beavers men's basketball team =

American college basketball season

2011–12 Oregon State Beavers men's basketball

CBI, Semifinals
- Conference: Pac-12 Conference
- Record: 21–15 (7–11 Pac-12)
- Head coach: Craig Robinson
- Assistant coaches: Doug Stewart; Nate Pomeday; David Grace
- Home arena: Gill Coliseum

2011–12 Pac-12 Conference men's basketball standings
	Conf.				Overall
Team	W		L	PCT	W		L	PCT
Washington	14	–	4	.778	24	–	11	.686
California	13	–	5	.722	24	–	10	.706
Oregon	13	–	5	.722	24	–	10	.706
Arizona	12	–	6	.667	23	–	12	.657
Colorado †	11	–	7	.611	24	–	12	.667
UCLA	11	–	7	.611	19	–	14	.576
Stanford	10	–	8	.556	26	–	11	.703
Oregon State	7	–	11	.389	21	–	15	.583
Washington State	7	–	11	.389	19	–	18	.514
Arizona State	6	–	12	.333	10	–	21	.323
Utah	3	–	15	.167	6	–	25	.194
USC	1	–	17	.056	6	–	26	.188
† Conference tournament winner As of March 8, 2012; Rankings from AP poll

The 2011–12 Oregon State Beavers men's basketball team represented Oregon State University in the 2011–12 NCAA Division I men's basketball season. Head coach Craig Robinson was in his fourth year with the team. The Beavers played their home games at Gill Coliseum in Corvallis, Oregon and were a member of the Pac-12 Conference. They finished with a record of 21–15 overall, 7–11 in Pac-12 play. They lost in the semifinals of the Pac-12 Basketball tournament to Arizona. They were invited to the 2012 College Basketball Invitational, where they defeated Western Illinois in the first round and TCU in the quarterfinals, before losing to Washington State in the semifinals.

== 2011 recruiting class ==
College recruiting
Name	Hometown	School	Height	Weight	Commit date
Daniel Gomis; PF	Thiès, SEG	Oak Hill Academy	6 ft 9 in (2.06 m)	220 lb (100 kg)	Jun 7, 2010
Daniel Gomis; PF	Recruit ratings: Scout: Rivals: (89)				
Challe Barton; SG	Göteborg, SWE	Sanda Basketball Academy	6 ft 3 in (1.91 m)	N/A	Feb 8, 2011
Challe Barton; SG	Recruit ratings: Scout: Rivals: (40)				
Overall recruit ranking: Scout: – Rivals: –
Note: In many cases, Scout, Rivals, 247Sports, On3, and ESPN may conflict in their listings of height and weight.; In these cases, the average was taken. ESPN grades are on a 100-point scale.; Sources: "Oregon State Commit List for 2011". Rivals.; "Men's Basketball Recruiting". Scout.; "ESPN – Oregon State Beavers Basketball Recruiting 2011". ESPN.; "Scout.com Team Recruiting Rankings". Scout.; "2011 Team Ranking". Rivals.

== Roster ==
2011–12 Oregon State Beavers men's basketball team
Players
Coaches

Pos.	#	Name	Height	Weight	Year	Hometown
F	0	Kevin McShane	6 ft 9 in (2.06 m)	240 lb (109 kg)	Sr	Portland, Oregon
G	1	Jared Cunningham	6 ft 4 in (1.93 m)	194 lb (88 kg)	Jr	San Leandro, California
G	2	Challe Barton	6 ft 3 in (1.91 m)	193 lb (88 kg)	Fr	Gothenburg, SWE
G	3	Ahmad Starks	5 ft 9 in (1.75 m)	165 lb (75 kg)	So	Chicago, Illinois
C	4	Chris Brown	6 ft 11 in (2.11 m)	250 lb (113 kg)	So	Houston, Texas
C	10	Daniel Jones	6 ft 11 in (2.11 m)	230 lb (104 kg)	So	Orland, California
F/C	11	Joe Burton	6 ft 7 in (2.01 m)	280 lb (127 kg)	Jr	Soboba, California
F/C	12	Angus Brandt	6 ft 10 in (2.08 m)	242 lb (110 kg)	So	Sydney, Australia
F	13	Rhys Murphy	6 ft 7 in (2.01 m)	195 lb (88 kg)	RS Fr	Sydney, Australia
F	14	Daniel Gomis	6 ft 10 in (2.08 m)	225 lb (102 kg)	Fr	Thiès, SEG
F	15	Eric Moreland	6 ft 10 in (2.08 m)	215 lb (98 kg)	RS Fr	Missouri City, Texas
F	44	Devon Collier	6 ft 8 in (2.03 m)	215 lb (98 kg)	So	Bronx, New York
G	55	Roberto Nelson	6 ft 3 in (1.91 m)	195 lb (88 kg)	So	Santa Barbara, California

Head coach

- Craig Robinson (Princeton)

Assistant coach(es)

- Doug Stewart (Brown)
- Nate Pomeday (Northwestern)
- David Grace (Park)

Legend

- (C) Team captain
- (S) Suspended
- (I) Ineligible
- (W) Walk-on
- Injured
- Current redshirt

Roster
Last update: 2010-12-15

== Schedule ==
Date time, TV	Rank^{#}	Opponent^{#}	Result	Record	Site (attendance) city, state
Exhibition
11/04/2011*; 7:00 pm		Pacific University	W 64–33	–	Gill Coliseum (2,624); Corvallis, OR
Regular season
11/12/2011*; 1:30 pm		Cal State Bakersfield	W 86–62	1–0	Gill Coliseum (5,423); Corvallis, OR
11/14/2011*; 7:00 pm		West Alabama; Legends Classic Regional Round	W 93–60	2–0	Gill Coliseum (3,208); Corvallis, OR
11/16/2011*; 7:00 pm		Hofstra; Legends Classic Regional Round	W 82–72	3–0	Gill Coliseum (3,870); Corvallis, OR
11/19/2011*; 6:00 pm, ESPN3		vs. Texas; Legends Classic Semifinals	W 100–95 ^{OT}	4–0	Izod Center (4,187); East Rutherford, NJ
11/21/2011*; 6:00 pm, ESPN3		vs. No. 18 Vanderbilt; Legends Classic Championship	L 62–64	4–1	Izod Center (3,249); East Rutherford, NJ
11/26/2011*; 11:00 am, ESPN3		at Towson	W 66–46	5–1	Towson Center (3,119); Towson, MD
12/04/2011*; 5:00 pm, RTNW		Montana	W 71–46	6–1	Gill Coliseum (5,518); Corvallis, OR
12/09/2011*; 7:00 pm, RTNW		Idaho	L 60–74	6–2	Gill Coliseum (5,119); Corvallis, OR
12/13/2011*; 7:00 pm, RTNW		UIC	W 95–53	7–2	Gill Coliseum (3,477); Corvallis, OR
12/15/2011*; 7:00 pm		Howard	W 93–72	8–2	Gill Coliseum (4,189); Corvallis, OR
12/18/2011*; 7:00 pm, RTNW		Portland State	W 101–68	9–2	Gill Coliseum (5,248); Corvallis, OR
12/21/2011*; 5:00 pm		at Chicago State	W 92–66	10–2	Jones Convocation Center (1,164); Chicago, IL
12/29/2011; 6:00 pm, RTNW		at Washington	L 80–95	10–3 (0–1)	Alaska Airlines Arena (9,592); Seattle, WA
12/31/2011; 3:00 pm, RTNW		vs. Washington State	L 76–81	10–4 (0–2)	Spokane Arena (8,282); Spokane, WA
01/05/2012; 7:00 pm		California	W 92–85	11–4 (1–2)	Gill Coliseum (5,162); Corvallis, OR
01/07/2012; 7:00 pm, RTNW		Stanford	L 101–103 ^{4OT}	11–5 (1–3)	Gill Coliseum (7,239); Corvallis, OR
01/12/2012; 5:30 pm, RTNW		at Arizona	L 73–81 ^{OT}	11–6 (1–4)	McKale Center (14,142); Tucson, AZ
01/14/2012; 5:00 pm, RTNW		at Arizona State	L 66–76	11–7 (1–5)	Wells Fargo Arena (5,068); Tempe, AZ
01/19/2012; 7:30 pm, FSN		UCLA	W 87–84	12–7 (2–5)	Gill Coliseum (6,019); Corvallis, OR
01/21/2012; 7:30 pm, RTNW		USC	W 78–59	13–7 (3–5)	Gill Coliseum (7,537); Corvallis, OR
01/29/2012; 3:30 pm, FSN		at Oregon; Civil War	W 76–71	14–7 (4–5)	Matthew Knight Arena (11,219); Eugene, OR
02/02/2012; 6:00 pm		at Colorado	L 60–82	14–8 (4–6)	Coors Events Center (7,858); Boulder, CO
02/04/2012; 2:00 pm		at Utah	W 76–58	15–8 (5–6)	Jon M. Huntsman Center (8,404); Salt Lake City, UT
02/09/2012; 7:00 pm		Washington State	L 73–83	15–9 (5–7)	Gill Coliseum (5,782); Corvallis, OR
02/12/2012; 2:30 pm, FSN		Washington	L 72–75	15–10 (5–8)	Gill Coliseum (8,027); Corvallis, OR
02/16/2012; 7:00 pm		at Stanford	L 82–87	15–11 (5–9)	Maples Pavilion (5,005); Stanford, CA
02/18/2012; 7:00 pm		at California	L 63–77	15–12 (5–10)	Haas Pavilion (11,331); Berkeley, CA
02/26/2012; 4:30 pm, FSN		Oregon; Civil War	L 73–74	15–13 (5–11)	Gill Coliseum (9,604); Corvallis, OR
03/01/2012; 7:00 pm		Utah	W 77–67	16–13 (6–11)	Gill Coliseum (3,643); Corvallis, OR
03/03/2012; 1:00 pm, FSN		Colorado	W 83–69	17–13 (7–11)	Gill Coliseum (4,326); Corvallis, OR
Pac-12 tournament
03/07/2012; 12:10 pm, FSN		vs. Washington State; First Round	W 69–64	18–13	Staples Center (5,973); Los Angeles, CA
03/08/2012; 12:10 pm, FSN		vs. Washington; Quarterfinals	W 86–84	19–13	Staples Center (8,780); Los Angeles, CA
03/09/2012; 6:10 pm, FSN		vs. Arizona; Semifinals	L 61–72	19–14	Staples Center (11,615); Los Angeles, CA
CBI
03/14/2012*; 7:00 pm, HDNet		Western Illinois; First Round	W 80–59	20–14	Gill Coliseum (1,931); Corvallis, OR
03/19/2012*; 7:00 pm, HDNet		TCU; Quarterfinals	W 101–81	21–14	Gill Coliseum (2,314); Corvallis, OR
03/21/2012*; 7:00 pm, HDNet		Washington State; Semifinals	L 55–72	21–15	Gill Coliseum (2,190); Corvallis, OR
*Non-conference game. ^{#}Rankings from AP Poll. (#) Tournament seedings in parentheses. All times are in Pacific Time.

== Highlights ==
- The Beavers upset Texas in the TicketCity Legends Classic.
- The 100 points scored by the Beavers against Texas was the first 100-point game since 1997 and the 27th time in school history. It's also the first Beavers team coached by Robinson to score 100 points.
- The December 4 game against Montana was the first game with over 5,500 fans in a non-Pac-12 home game since the team played LSU in 2006.
- The January 7 quadruple-overtime 101–103 loss to Stanford was the longest basketball game in Oregon State history.
- The team won 20 games for the first time since legend Gary Payton was a senior, and posted just its second winning season since that same year, 1989–90.
- The team pulled off the biggest upset in Pac-12 Tournament history when they knocked off No. 1 seed-Washington and advanced to postseason play for the third time in four years.
- The Beavers led the conference in scoring for the first time ever, and had their most 100-point games, 90-point games and 80-point games in school history, while leading the Pac-12 in steals for the third consecutive year.
