= 2011–12 Colorado Buffaloes men's basketball team =

American college basketball season

2011–12 Colorado Buffaloes men's basketball

Pac-12 tournament champions

NCAA tournament, Round of 32
- Conference: Pac-12 Conference
- Record: 24–12 (11–7 Pac–12)
- Head coach: Tad Boyle
- Assistant coaches: Tom Abatemarco; Jean Prioleau; Mike Rohn
- Home arena: Coors Events Center

2011–12 Pac-12 Conference men's basketball standings
	Conf.				Overall
Team	W		L	PCT	W		L	PCT
Washington	14	–	4	.778	24	–	11	.686
California	13	–	5	.722	24	–	10	.706
Oregon	13	–	5	.722	24	–	10	.706
Arizona	12	–	6	.667	23	–	12	.657
Colorado †	11	–	7	.611	24	–	12	.667
UCLA	11	–	7	.611	19	–	14	.576
Stanford	10	–	8	.556	26	–	11	.703
Oregon State	7	–	11	.389	21	–	15	.583
Washington State	7	–	11	.389	19	–	18	.514
Arizona State	6	–	12	.333	10	–	21	.323
Utah	3	–	15	.167	6	–	25	.194
USC	1	–	17	.056	6	–	26	.188
† Conference tournament winner As of March 8, 2012; Rankings from AP poll

The 2011–12 Colorado Buffaloes men's basketball team represented the University of Colorado in the 2011–12 NCAA Division I men's basketball season. Head coach Tad Boyle was in his second season at Colorado. This was their first year as members of the Pac-12 Conference. They finished the regular season with 24–12 overall, 11–7 in Pac-12 play. They won the 2012 Pac-12 Conference men's basketball tournament and earned a trip to the 2012 NCAA Division I men's basketball tournament with an 11 seed in south. They defeated UNLV in the second round before they lost to Baylor in the third round.

== Roster ==
#	Name	Height	Weight (lbs.)	Position	Class	Hometown	Previous School
0	Askia Booker	6 ft 1 in (1.85 m)	160 pounds (73 kg)	G	Fr.	Los Angeles, California	Price HS
1	Nate Tomlinson	6 ft 3 in (1.91 m)	190 pounds (86 kg)	G	Sr.	Sydney	Lee Academy
2	Shannon Sharpe	6 ft 1 in (1.85 m)	200 pounds (91 kg)	G	So.	Corona, California	Centennial HS
15	Shane Harris-Tunks	6 ft 11 in (2.11 m)	225 pounds (102 kg)	F/C	RS So.	Liverpool, New South Wales	Australian Institute of Sport
21	André Roberson	6 ft 7 in (2.01 m)	195 pounds (88 kg)	G	So.	San Antonio, Texas	Wagner HS
23	Sabatino Chen	6 ft 3 in (1.91 m)	180 pounds (82 kg)	G	Sr.	Louisville, Colorado	University of Denver
25	Spencer Dinwiddie	6 ft 1 in (1.85 m)	160 pounds (73 kg)	G	Fr.	Woodland Hills, California	Taft HS
30	Carlon Brown	6 ft 5 in (1.96 m)	215 pounds (98 kg)	G	RS Sr.	Riverside, California	University of Utah
31	Jeremy Adams	6 ft 5 in (1.96 m)	215 pounds (98 kg)	G	So.	Madison, Mississippi	Navarro JC
32	Ben Mills	7 ft 0 in (2.13 m)	215 pounds (98 kg)	C	So.	Hartland, Wisconsin	Arrowhead HS
33	Austin Dufault	6 ft 9 in (2.06 m)	230 pounds (100 kg)	F	Sr.	Killdeer, North Dakota	Killdeer HS
55	Trey Eckloff	6 ft 10 in (2.08 m)	235 pounds (107 kg)	F	Sr.	Englewood, Colorado	Cherry Creek HS

== Schedule ==
Date time, TV	Rank^{#}	Opponent^{#}	Result	Record	Site (attendance) city, state
Regular season
November 11, 2011*; 8:00 pm		Fort Lewis	W 85–57	1–0	Coors Events Center (7,925); Boulder, CO
November 17, 2011*; 5:30 pm, ESPNU		vs. Wichita State; Puerto Rico Tip-Off semi-finals	L 58–67	1–1	José Miguel Agrelot Coliseum (5,322); San Juan, PR
November 19, 2011*; 4:30 pm		vs. Maryland; Puerto Rico Tip-Off loser bracket	L 71–78	1–2	José Miguel Agrelot Coliseum (N/A); San Juan, PR
November 20, 2011*; 9:30 am		vs. Western Michigan; Puerto Rico Tip-Off 7th place game	W 81–76	2–2	José Miguel Agrelot Coliseum (N/A); San Juan, PR
November 23, 2011*; 7:00 pm, The Mtn.		at Air Force	W 76–73 ^{OT}	3–2	Clune Arena (3,834); Colorado Springs, CO
November 28, 2011*; 6:30 pm, FSN		Georgia	W 70–68	4–2	Coors Events Center (6,453); Boulder, CO
November 30, 2011*; 6:00 pm, The Mtn.		at Colorado State	L 64–65	4–3	Moby Arena (6,481); Fort Collins, CO
July 12, 2011*; 7:00 pm		Fresno State	W 71–64	5–3	Coors Events Center (5,562); Boulder, CO
September 12, 2011*; 7:00 pm, RTRM		Wyoming	L 54–65	5–4	Coors Events Center (7,049); Boulder, CO
December 19, 2011*; 7:00 pm		Cal State Bakersfield	W 70–64	6–4	Coors Events Center (5,531); Boulder, CO
December 22, 2011*; 7:00 pm		Texas Southern	W 56–51	7–4	Coors Events Center (4,621); Boulder, CO
December 28, 2011*; 7:00 pm, RTRM		New Orleans	W 92–34	8–4	Coors Events Center (5,277); Boulder, CO
December 31, 2011; 4:00 pm, RTRM		Utah	W 73–33	9–4 (1–0)	Coors Events Center (6,491); Boulder, CO
May 1, 2012; 7:00 pm, RTRM		Washington	W 87–69	10–4 (2–0)	Coors Events Center (7,110); Boulder, CO
July 1, 2012; 2:00 pm, FSN		Washington State	W 71–60	11–4 (3–0)	Coors Events Center (8,518); Boulder, CO
December 1, 2012; 9:00 pm, CSNCA		at California	L 50–57	11–5 (3–1)	Haas Pavilion (7,577); Berkeley, CA
January 14, 2012; 2:00 pm, FSN		at Stanford	L 64–84	11–6 (3–2)	Maples Pavilion (5,850); Stanford, CA
January 19, 2012; 6:30 pm, RTRM		Arizona State	W 69–54	12–6 (4–2)	Coors Events Center (8,278); Boulder, CO
January 21, 2012; 4:00 pm, RTRM		Arizona	W 64–63	13–6 (5–2)	Coors Events Center (11,056); Boulder, CO
January 26, 2012; 8:30 pm		at USC	W 74–50	14–6 (6–2)	Galen Center (3,147); Los Angeles, CA
January 28, 2012; 2:00 pm, PT		at UCLA	L 60–77	14–7 (6–3)	LA Sports Arena (9,253); Los Angeles, CA
February 2, 2012; 7:00 pm		Oregon State	W 82–60	15–7 (7–3)	Coors Events Center (7,858); Boulder, CO
April 2, 2012; 7:00 pm, RTRM		Oregon	W 72–71	16–7 (8–3)	Coors Events Center (11,052); Boulder, CO
September 2, 2012; 7:00 pm, ESPN		at Arizona	L 57–71	16–8 (8–4)	McKale Center (14,225); Tucson, AZ
November 2, 2012; 4:30 pm, RTRM		at Arizona State	W 63–49	17–8 (9–4)	Wells Fargo Arena (5,201); Tempe, AZ
February 18, 2012; 3:00 pm, FSN		at Utah	W 55–48	18–8 (10–4)	Jon M. Huntsman Center (N/A); Salt Lake City, UT
February 23, 2012; 8:30 pm, FSN		Stanford	L 50–74	18–9 (10–5)	Coors Events Center (11,036); Boulder, CO
February 26, 2012; 3:30 pm, FSN		California	W 70–57	19–9 (11–5)	Coors Events Center (11,043); Boulder, CO
January 3, 2012; 8:30 pm, FSN		at Oregon	L 81–90	19–10 (11–6)	Matthew Knight Arena (10,056); Eugene, OR
March 3, 2012; 2:00 pm, FSN		at Oregon State	L 69–83	19–11 (11–7)	Gill Coliseum (4,326); Corvallis, OR
Pac-12 tournament
July 3, 2012; 9:40 pm, FSN		vs. Utah; First round	W 53–41	20–11	Staples Center (6,747); Los Angeles, CA
August 3, 2012; 9:40 pm, FSN		vs. Oregon; Quarter-finals	W 63–62	21–11	Staples Center (9,317); Los Angeles, CA
September 3, 2012; 9:40 pm, FSN		vs. California; Semi-finals	W 70–59	22–11	Staples Center (11,615); Los Angeles, CA
October 3, 2012; 4:10 pm, CBS		vs. Arizona; Championship Game	W 53–51	23–11	Staples Center (11,197); Los Angeles, CA
2012 NCAA tournament
March 15, 2012*; 7:57 pm, truTV	No. (S 11)	vs. No. 23 (S 6) UNLV; Second round	W 68–64	24–11	The Pit (15,674); Albuquerque, NM
March 17, 2012*; 6:40 pm, TNT	No. (S 11)	vs. No. 9 (S 3) Baylor; Third round	L 63–80	24–12	The Pit (12,128); Albuquerque, NM
*Non-conference game. ^{#}Rankings from Coaches' Poll. (#) Tournament seedings in parentheses. All times are in Mountain Time (#) during NCAA Tournament is seed with Region.
