= 2011–12 Seattle Redhawks men's basketball team =

American college basketball season

2011–12 Seattle Redhawks men's basketball
- Conference: Independent
- Record: 12–15
- Head coach: Cameron Dollar (3rd season)
- Assistant coaches: Donald Dollar; Darren Talley; Yasir Rosemond
- Home arena: KeyArena

2011–12 NCAA Division I men's basketball independents standings
	Conf.				Overall
Team	W		L	PCT	W		L	PCT
Cal State Bakersfield		–		–	16	–	15	.516
Seattle		–		–	12	–	15	.444
Nebraska–Omaha		–		–	11	–	18	.379
Longwood		–		–	10	–	21	.323
Rankings from AP Poll

The 2011–12 Seattle Redhawks men's basketball team represented the Seattle University in the 2011–12 college basketball season. This was head coach Cameron Dollar's 3rd season at Seattle U. The Redhawks played their home games at KeyArena as Independent members of Division I. They finished 12–15 overall.

It was announced that this will be their last season as Independent Division I and will be moving on to Western Athletic Conference starting in the 2012–13 season.

== 2011–12 Team ==
=== Roster ===
#	Name	Height	Weight (lbs.)	Position	Class	Hometown	Previous Team(s)
0	Prince Obasi	6'3"	205	G	Jr.	Reseda, California	Saddleback College
1	Allen Tate	6'5"	205	G	Jr.	Hobbs, New Mexico	Lamar College
2	Aaron Broussard	6'5"	205	F	Sr.	Federal Way, Washington	Federal Way HS
5	Cervante Burrell	5'10"	170	G	Sr.	Sacramento, California	Yuba College
10	Sterling Carter	6'0"	200	G	So.	Seattle, Washington	Pacific
11	Deshaun Sunderhaus	6'9"	215	F	Fr.	Rockdale County, Georgia	Rockdale County HS
12	Clarence Trent	6'6"	225	F	RS So.	Tacoma, Washington	Washington
13	Louis Green	6'9"	240	C	Jr.	Westchester, Illinois	Moraine Valley CC
15	Chad Rasmussen	6'7"	200	F	Jr.	University Place, Washington	Tacoma CC
25	Eric Wallace	6'7"	233	F	Sr.	Winston-Salem, North Carolina	DePaul
31	T.J. Diop	6'8"	215	F	Jr.	Queensland, Australia	Lamar College
33	Garvin Gilmore	6'8"	220	F	RS Jr.	Pasco, Washington	Pasco HS
34	Obie Hurt	6'7"	230	F	Fr.	Milledgeville, Georgia	Baldwin HS
35	Jarell Flora	6'3"	180	G	RS Fr.	Bremerton, Washington	Bremerton HS

== Schedule ==
Date time, TV	Rank^{#}	Opponent^{#}	Result	Record	Site (attendance) city, state
Exhibition
11/12/2011*; 7:00 pm		Pacific Lutheran	W 101–53	–	KeyArena (2,163); Seattle, Washington
Regular Season
11/15/2011*; 7:05 pm		at Portland State	L 65–66	0–1	Stott Center (827); Portland, Oregon
11/19/2011*; 3:00 pm, RTNW		San Francisco	L 63–69	0–2	KeyArena (4,140); Seattle, Washington
11/22/2011*; 6:00 pm		at Montana State	W 85–73	1–2	Worthington Arena (2,407); Bozeman, Montana
11/28/2011*; 7:00 pm		vs. Evergreen State; ShoWare College Classic	W 77–54	2–2	ShoWare Center (1,025); Kent, Washington
12/01/2011*; 7:00 pm, RTNW		Stanford	L 49–72	2–3	KeyArena (3,046); Seattle, Washington
12/04/2011*; 11:00 am		at Harvard	L 70–80	2–4	Lavietes Pavilion (1,896); Cambridge, Massachusetts
12/11/2011*; 3:00 pm		Idaho	L 62–73	2–5	KeyArena (2,630); Seattle, Washington
12/14/2011*; 5:05 pm		at Arkansas State	L 74–87	2–6	Convocation Center (2,582); Jonesboro, Arkansas
12/17/2011*; 6:00 pm, ESPN3		at Utah State	L 53–78	2–7	Smith Spectrum (9,337); Logan, Utah
12/21/2011*; 7:00 pm, RTNW		No. 24 Virginia	L 77–83	2–8	KeyArena (3,541); Seattle, Washington
12/29/2011*; 8:15 pm		Nebraska–Omaha; Elgin Baylor Classic	W 91–72	3–8	KeyArena (2,302); Seattle, Washington
12/30/2011*; 8:15 pm		San Jose State; Elgin Baylor Classic	L 74–84	3–9	KeyArena (2,436); Seattle, Washington
01/07/2012*; 6:05 pm		at Utah Valley	L 72–77	3–10	UCCU Center (2,486); Orem, Utah
01/10/2012*; 7:00 pm, RTNW		at Washington	L 83–91	3–11	Alaska Airlines Arena (8,618); Seattle, Washington
01/13/2012*; 7:10 pm		Utah Valley	L 74–84	3–12	KeyArena (2,363); Seattle, Washington
01/19/2012*; 7:00 pm		Utah State	W 73–66	5–12	KeyArena (2,510); Seattle, Washington
01/24/2012*; 7:00 pm		at UC Irvine	L 67–78	5–13	Bren Events Center (671); Irvine, California
02/04/2012*; 7:10 pm		Arkansas State	W 75–69	6–13	KeyArena (3,518); Seattle, Washington
02/07/2012*; 6:00 pm		at Idaho	L 69–70	6–14	Cowan Spectrum (803); Moscow, Idaho
02/11/2012*; 11:00 am		at Longwood	W 100–99 ^{OT}	7–14	Willett Hall (1,412); Farmville, Virginia
02/14/2012*; 7:10 pm		Northwest	W 90–58	8–14	KeyArena (2,286); Seattle, Washington
02/16/2012*; 7:10 pm		Pepperdine	W 81–70	9–14	KeyArena (2,959); Seattle, Washington
02/20/2012*; 7:10 pm		UC Davis	W 73–59	10–14	KeyArena (2,618); Seattle, Washington
02/23/2012*; 7:00 pm		at Fresno State	L 72–78	10–15	Save Mart Center (5,980); Fresno, California
02/29/2012*; 11:00 am		Longwood	W 111–74	11–15	KeyArena (1,412); Seattle, Washington
03/10/2012*; 7:10 pm		Portland State	W 94–83	12–15	KeyArena (5,105); Seattle, Washington
*Non-conference game. ^{#}Rankings from AP Poll. (#) Tournament seedings in parentheses. All times are in Pacific Time.
