= 2011–12 Arizona Wildcats men's basketball team =

American college basketball season

2011–12 Arizona Wildcats men's basketball

NIT, First Round
- Conference: Pac-12 Conference
- Record: 23–12 (12–6 Pac-12)
- Head coach: Sean Miller (3rd season)
- Assistant coaches: James Whitford; Joe Pasternack; Emanuel Richardson
- Home arena: McKale Center

2011–12 Pac-12 Conference men's basketball standings
	Conf.				Overall
Team	W		L	PCT	W		L	PCT
Washington	14	–	4	.778	24	–	11	.686
California	13	–	5	.722	24	–	10	.706
Oregon	13	–	5	.722	24	–	10	.706
Arizona	12	–	6	.667	23	–	12	.657
Colorado †	11	–	7	.611	24	–	12	.667
UCLA	11	–	7	.611	19	–	14	.576
Stanford	10	–	8	.556	26	–	11	.703
Oregon State	7	–	11	.389	21	–	15	.583
Washington State	7	–	11	.389	19	–	18	.514
Arizona State	6	–	12	.333	10	–	21	.323
Utah	3	–	15	.167	6	–	25	.194
USC	1	–	17	.056	6	–	26	.188
† Conference tournament winner As of March 8, 2012; Rankings from AP poll

The 2011–12 Arizona Wildcats men's basketball team represented the University of Arizona during the 2011–12 NCAA Division I men's basketball season. The Wildcats, led by third-year head coach Sean Miller, played their home games at the McKale Center and were members of the Pac-12 Conference. They finished with 23–12 overall, 12–6 in Pac-12 play. They lost the championship game of the 2012 Pac-12 Conference men's basketball tournament by Colorado which hurt their chances to qualify for the 2012 NCAA Division I men's basketball tournament, instead they were invited to the 2012 National Invitation Tournament which they lost in the first round by Bucknell.

== Departures ==
Name	Pos.	Height	Weight	Year	Hometown	Notes
Jamelle Horne	F	6'7"	224	Sr.	San Diego, CA	Graduated
Derrick Willams	F	6'8"	241	So.	La Mirada, CA	Declared for 2011 NBA draft
Lamont Jones	G	6'0"	196	So.	Harlem, NY	Transferred to Iona
Daniel Bejarano	G	6'4"	208	Fr.	Phoenix, AZ	Transferred to Colorado State

== Recruits ==
College recruiting information
Name	Hometown	School	Height	Weight	Commit date
Nick Johnson; SG	Gilbert, AZ	Findlay Prep	6 ft 3 in (1.91 m)	200 lb (91 kg)	Aug 8, 2010
Nick Johnson; SG	Recruit ratings: Scout: Rivals: (97)				
Sidiki Johnson; PF	Brooklyn, NY	Wadleigh	6 ft 8 in (2.03 m)	220 lb (100 kg)	Aug 1, 2009
Sidiki Johnson; PF	Recruit ratings: Scout: Rivals: (92)				
Josiah Turner; PG	Sacramento, CA	Quality Education Academy	6 ft 3 in (1.91 m)	175 lb (79 kg)	Sep 9, 2010
Josiah Turner; PG	Recruit ratings: Scout: Rivals: (97)				
Angelo Chol; C	Khartoum, Sudan	Hoover	6 ft 8 in (2.03 m)	205 lb (93 kg)	Feb 7, 2011
Angelo Chol; C	Recruit ratings: Scout: Rivals: (94)				
Overall recruit ranking: Scout: #4 Rivals: #4 ESPN: #7
Note: In many cases, Scout, Rivals, 247Sports, On3, and ESPN may conflict in their listings of height and weight.; In these cases, the average was taken. ESPN grades are on a 100-point scale.; Sources: "ESPN". ESPN.; "2011 Team Ranking". Rivals.

== Roster ==
2011–12 Arizona Wildcats men's basketball team
Players
Coaches

Pos.	#	Name	Height	Weight	Year	Hometown
G	0	Dondre Wise	6 ft 1 in (1.85 m)	220 lb (100 kg)	Sr	Houston, Texas
G/F	3	Kevin Parrom	6 ft 6 in (1.98 m)	215 lb (98 kg)	Jr	Bronx, New York
G	5	Robert Arvizu (W)	6 ft 0 in (1.83 m)	195 lb (88 kg)	So	Phoenix, Arizona
G	11	Josiah Turner	6 ft 3 in (1.91 m)	192 lb (87 kg)	Fr	Sacramento, California
G	13	Nick Johnson	6 ft 2 in (1.88 m)	198 lb (90 kg)	Fr	Gilbert, Arizona
C	14	Kyryl Natyazhko	6 ft 11 in (2.11 m)	275 lb (125 kg)	Jr	Dnipropetrovsk, Ukraine
G	20	Jordin Mayes	6 ft 2 in (1.88 m)	196 lb (89 kg)	So	Los Angeles, California
G	21	Kyle Fogg	6 ft 3 in (1.91 m)	188 lb (85 kg)	Sr	Brea, California
G	24	Brendon Lavender	6 ft 5 in (1.96 m)	212 lb (96 kg)	Sr	Mesa, Arizona
F	30	Angelo Chol	6 ft 9 in (2.06 m)	217 lb (98 kg)	Fr	Khartoum, Sudan
F	33	Jesse Perry	6 ft 7 in (2.01 m)	217 lb (98 kg)	Sr	St. Louis, Missouri
F	44	Solomon Hill	6 ft 6 in (1.98 m)	226 lb (103 kg)	Jr	Los Angeles, California
C	50	Alex Jacobson	7 ft 0 in (2.13 m)	253 lb (115 kg)	RS Sr	Brea, California
G	51	Quinton Crawford (W)	6 ft 1 in (1.85 m)	190 lb (86 kg)	Jr	Old Bridge, New Jersey
F	52	Max Wiepking (W)	6 ft 6 in (1.98 m)	210 lb (95 kg)	Jr	Englewood, Colorado
F	55	Drew Mellon (W)	6 ft 5 in (1.96 m)	210 lb (95 kg)	Fr	Santa Ana, California

Head coach

- Sean Miller (Pittsburgh)

Assistant coach(es)

- James Whitford (Wisconsin)
- Joe Pasternack (Indiana)
- Emanuel Richardson (Pitt–Johnstown)

Legend

- (C) Team captain
- (S) Suspended
- (I) Ineligible
- (W) Walk-on
- Injured
- Current redshirt

Roster

- March 7, 2012 – Josiah Turner was suspended indefinitely from the basketball team for a violation of team rules.

=== Depth chart ===
Pos.	Starting 5	Bench 1	Bench 2	Bench 3
C	Jesse Perry	Kyryl Natyazhko	Alex Jacobson
PF	Solomon Hill	Angelo Chol
SF	Kyle Fogg	Kevin Parrom	Max Wiepking	Drew Mellon
SG	Nick Johnson	Brendon Lavender	Quinton Crawford
PG	Josiah Turner	Jordin Mayes	Dondre Wise	Robert Arvizu

== Schedule ==
Date time, TV	Rank^{#}	Opponent^{#}	Result	Record	Site (attendance) city, state
Exhibition
10/27/2011*; 6:30 PM, FCS	No. 16	Seattle Pacific	L 68–69	–	McKale Center (12,075); Tucson, AZ
11/01/2011*; 6:30 PM, FSAZ	No. 16	Humboldt State	W 60–51	–	McKale Center (11,916); Tucson, AZ
Non-conference regular season
11/07/2011*; 7:00 PM, ESPNU	No. 16	Valparaiso; 2K Sports Classic campus-site game	W 73–64	1–0	McKale Center (12,871); Tucson, AZ
11/09/2011*; 7:00 PM, ESPN2	No. 16	Duquesne; 2K Sports Classic campus-site game	W 67–59	2–0	McKale Center (13,289); Tucson, AZ
11/13/2011*; 4:00 PM, FSAZ/KWBA	No. 16	Ball State	W 73–63	3–0	McKale Center (12,833); Tucson, AZ
11/17/2011*; 7:30 PM, ESPN2	No. 15	vs. St. John's; 2K Sports Classic Semifinals	W 81–72	4–0	Madison Square Garden (9,036); New York, NY
11/18/2011*; 5:00 PM, ESPN2	No. 15	vs. Mississippi State; 2K Sports Classic Championship	L 57–67	4–1	Madison Square Garden (6,338); New York, NY
11/23/2011*; 6:30 PM, FSAZ+	No. 23	San Diego State	L 57–61	4–2	McKale Center (13,761); Tucson, AZ
11/29/2011*; 7:00 PM, FSAZ+		at New Mexico State	W 83–76	5–2	Pan American Center (7,966); Las Cruces, NM
12/03/2011*; 7:00 PM, FSAZ/KWBA		Northern Arizona	W 53–39	6–2	McKale Center (13,811); Tucson, AZ
12/07/2011*; 5:00 PM, ESPN2		at No. 12 Florida	L 72–78 ^{OT}	6–3	O'Connell Center (10,531); Gainesville, FL
12/10/2011*; 2:00 PM, FSN		Clemson	W 63–47	7–3	McKale Center (12,790); Tucson, AZ
12/17/2011*; 2:00 PM, CBS		vs. Gonzaga; Battle in Seattle	L 60–71	7–4	KeyArena (15,127); Seattle, WA
12/20/2011*; 6:00 PM, FSAZ+/KWBA		Oakland	W 85–73	8–4	McKale Center (13,735); Tucson, AZ
12/22/2011*; 5:00 PM, FSAZ/KWBA		Bryant	W 100–60	9–4	McKale Center (13,744); Tucson, AZ
Pac-12 regular season
12/31/2011; 3:30 PM, KWBA/FSAZ		Arizona State; Rivalry	W 68–51	10–4 (1–0)	McKale Center (14,499); Tucson, AZ
01/05/2012; 9:00 PM, FSN		vs. UCLA; John R. Wooden Classic	L 58–65	10–5 (1–1)	Honda Center (9,247); Anaheim, CA
01/08/2012; 3:30 PM, FSN		at USC	W 57–46	11–5 (2–1)	Galen Center (5,112); Los Angeles, CA
01/12/2012; 6:30 PM, KWBA/FCS		Oregon State	W 81–73 ^{OT}	12–5 (3–1)	McKale Center (14,142); Tucson, AZ
01/14/2012; 1:30 PM, CBS		Oregon	L 57–59	12–6 (3–2)	McKale Center (14,553); Tucson, AZ
01/19/2012; 6:30 PM, KWBA/FSAZ		at Utah	W 77–51	13–6 (4–2)	Jon M. Huntsman Center (8,492); Salt Lake City, UT
01/21/2012; 4:00 PM, KWBA/FSAZ		at Colorado	L 63–64	13–7 (4–3)	Coors Events Center (11,056); Boulder, CO
01/26/2012; 8:30 PM, FSN		Washington State	W 85–61	14–7 (5–3)	McKale Center (14,138); Tucson, AZ
01/28/2012; 5:00 PM, ESPN		Washington; ESPN College GameDay	L 67–69	14–8 (5–4)	McKale Center (14,604); Tucson, AZ
02/02/2012; 9:00 PM, FSN		at California	W 78–74	15–8 (6–4)	Haas Pavilion (9,690); Berkleley, CA
02/04/2012; 1:00 PM, FSN		at Stanford	W 56–43	16–8 (7–4)	Maples Pavilion (6,231); Stanford, CA
02/09/2012; 7:00 PM, ESPN		Colorado	W 71–57	17–8 (8–4)	McKale Center (14,225); Tucson, AZ
02/11/2012; 12:00 PM, FSN		Utah	W 70–61	18–8 (9–4)	McKale Center (14,084); Tucson, AZ
02/16/2012; 7:00 PM, FSN		at Washington State	W 76–72	19–8 (10–4)	Beasley Coliseum (3,616); Pullman, WA
02/18/2012; 1:00 PM, FSN		at Washington	L 70–79	19–9 (10–5)	Alaska Airlines Arena (10,000); Seattle, WA
02/23/2012; 6:30 PM, FSAZ		USC	W 70–54	20–9 (11–5)	McKale Center (14,593); Tucson, AZ
02/25/2012; 12:00 PM, CBS		UCLA	W 65–63	21–9 (12–5)	McKale Center (14,724); Tucson, AZ
03/04/2012; 1:30 PM, FSN		at Arizona State; Rivalry	L 80–87	21–10 (12–6)	Wells Fargo Arena (7,864); Tempe, AZ
Pac-12 Tournament
03/08/2012; 3:40 PM, FSN		vs. UCLA; Quarterfinals	W 66–58	22–10	Staples Center (8,780 ) Los Angeles, CA
03/09/2012; 7:10 PM, FSN		vs. Oregon State; Semifinals	W 72–61	23–10	Staples Center (N/A); Los Angeles, CA
03/10/2012; 4:10 PM, CBS		vs. Colorado; Championship	L 51–53	23–11	Staples Center (11,197); Los Angeles, CA
NIT
03/14/2012*; 6:00 PM, ESPN2		Bucknell; First Round	L 54–65	23–12	McKale Center (8,433); Tucson, AZ
*Non-conference game. ^{#}Rankings from AP Poll. (#) Tournament seedings in parentheses. All times are in Mountain Time.

== Rankings ==
Ranking movement Legend: ██ Increase in ranking. ██ Decrease in ranking. ██ Not ranked the previous week.
Poll	Pre	Wk 1	Wk 2	Wk 3	Wk 4	Wk 5	Wk 6	Wk 7	Wk 8	Wk 9	Wk 10	Wk 11	Wk 12	Wk 13	Wk 14	Wk 15	Wk 16	Wk 17	Wk 18	Final
AP	16	16	15	23	RV	RV	NR													
Coaches	16	16	16	23	NR	RV	NR													
