= 2011–12 Washington Huskies men's basketball team =

American college basketball season

2011–12 Washington Huskies men's basketball

Pac-12 regular season champions

NIT, Semifinals
- Conference: Pac-12 Conference
- Record: 24–11 (14–4 Pac-12)
- Head coach: Lorenzo Romar
- Assistant coaches: Raphael Chillious; Paul Fortier; Jim Shaw
- Home arena: Alaska Airlines Arena

2011–12 Pac-12 Conference men's basketball standings
	Conf.				Overall
Team	W		L	PCT	W		L	PCT
Washington	14	–	4	.778	24	–	11	.686
California	13	–	5	.722	24	–	10	.706
Oregon	13	–	5	.722	24	–	10	.706
Arizona	12	–	6	.667	23	–	12	.657
Colorado †	11	–	7	.611	24	–	12	.667
UCLA	11	–	7	.611	19	–	14	.576
Stanford	10	–	8	.556	26	–	11	.703
Oregon State	7	–	11	.389	21	–	15	.583
Washington State	7	–	11	.389	19	–	18	.514
Arizona State	6	–	12	.333	10	–	21	.323
Utah	3	–	15	.167	6	–	25	.194
USC	1	–	17	.056	6	–	26	.188
† Conference tournament winner As of March 8, 2012; Rankings from AP poll

The 2011–12 Washington Huskies men's basketball team represented the University of Washington in the 2011–12 college basketball season. This was head coach Lorenzo Romar's 10th season at Washington. The Huskies played their home games at Alaska Airlines Arena at Hec Edmundson Pavilion as members of the Pac-12 Conference. They finished with 24–11 overall, 14–4 in Pac-12 play. They were the 2012 Pac-12 Conference regular season champions, but lost in the quarterfinals of the Pac-12 Basketball tournament to Oregon State. They were invited to the 2012 National Invitation Tournament, where they defeated Texas–Arlington, Northwestern and rival Oregon before losing in the semifinals to Minnesota.

== Departures ==
Name	Number	Pos.	Height	Weight	Year	Hometown	Reason for departure
Venoy Overton	1	G	6'0"	185	Senior	Seattle, WA	Graduated
Isaiah Thomas	2	G	5'9"	185	Junior	Tacoma, WA	NBA draft
Antoine Hosley	10	G	5'11"	185	Freshman	Portland, OR	Left team
Matthew Bryan-Amaning	11	F	6'9"	240	Senior	London, England, UK	Graduated
Justin Holiday	22	F	6'6"	180	Senior	Chatsworth, CA	Graduated
Tyreese Breshers	33	F	6'7"	255	Sophomore	Los Angeles, CA	Injury

== Recruits ==
College recruiting
Name	Hometown	School	Height	Weight	Commit date
Andrew Andrews; PG	Portland, Oregon	Benson	6 ft 0 in (1.83 m)	175 lb (79 kg)	Sep 21, 2010
Andrew Andrews; PG	Recruit ratings: Scout: Rivals: (86)				
Martin Breunig; PF	Leverkusen, Germany	St. John's Northwest Military Acad.	6 ft 9 in (2.06 m)	205 lb (93 kg)	Jun 4, 2011
Martin Breunig; PF	Recruit ratings: Scout: Rivals: (87)				
Jernard Jarreau; PF	New Orleans, Louisiana	McDonogh No. 35	6 ft 10 in (2.08 m)	200 lb (91 kg)	Sep 25, 2010
Jernard Jarreau; PF	Recruit ratings: Scout: Rivals: (91)				
Hikeem Stewart; SG	Seattle, Washington	Rainier Beach	6 ft 3 in (1.91 m)	180 lb (82 kg)	Sep 6, 2010
Hikeem Stewart; SG	Recruit ratings: Scout: Rivals: (92)				
Tony Wroten; PG	Seattle, Washington	Garfield	6 ft 4 in (1.93 m)	195 lb (88 kg)	Oct 7, 2010
Tony Wroten; PG	Recruit ratings: Scout: Rivals: (97)				
Shawn Kemp Jr. PF	Canton, Georgia	Hargrave Military Academy	6 ft 9 in (2.06 m)	265 lb (120 kg)	Jul 7, 2011
Shawn Kemp Jr. PF	Recruit ratings: Scout: Rivals: (40)				
Overall recruit ranking: Scout: nr Rivals: nr ESPN: nr
Note: In many cases, Scout, Rivals, 247Sports, On3, and ESPN may conflict in their listings of height and weight.; In these cases, the average was taken. ESPN grades are on a 100-point scale.; Sources: "ESPN". ESPN.; "2011 Team Ranking". Rivals.

== 2011–12 team ==
=== Roster ===
#	Name	Height	Weight (lbs.)	Position	Class	Hometown	Previous team(s)
0	Abdul Gaddy	6'3"	185	G	Jr.	Tacoma, WA, U.S.	Bellarmine Prep
4	Hikeem Stewart	6'2"	175	G	Fr.	Seattle, WA, U.S.	Rainier Beach HS
5	Aziz N'Diaye	7'0"	260	C	Jr.	Dakar, Senegal	College of Southern Idaho
10	Martin Breunig	6'8"	210	F	Fr.	Leverkusen, Germany	St. John's Northwestern Military Acad.
12	Andrew Andrews	6'2"	195	G	Fr.	Portland, OR, U.S.	Benson Polytechnic HS
14	Tony Wroten	6'5"	205	G	Fr.	Seattle, WA, U.S.	Garfield HS
15	Scott Suggs	6'6"	195	G	Sr.	Washington, MO, U.S.	Washington HS
20	Alex Wegner	6'7"	190	G/F	Fr.	Vashon Island, WA, U.S.	Vashon Island HS
23	C. J. Wilcox	6'5"	185	G	RS So.	Pleasant Grove, UT, U.S.	Pleasant Grove HS
30	Desmond Simmons	6'7"	220	F	RS Fr.	Vallejo, CA, U.S.	Salesian HS
31	Terrence Ross	6'6"	195	G	So.	Portland, OR, U.S.	Jefferson HS
33	Jernard Jarreau	6'10"	195	F	Fr.	New Orleans, LA, U.S.	McDonogh No. 35 Senior HS
35	Austin Seferian-Jenkins	6'6"	258	F	Fr.	Fox Island, WA, U.S.	Gig Harbor HS
40	Shawn Kemp, Jr.	6'9"	265	F	Fr.	Canton, GA, U.S.	Hargraves Military Academy
42	Brendan Sherrer	6'8"	255	F	Sr.	Monroe, WA, U.S.	Archbishop Murphy HS
44	Darnell Gant	6'8"	230	F	RS Sr.	Los Angeles, CA, U.S.	Crenshaw HS

=== Coaching staff ===
Name	Position	Year at Washington	Alma mater (year)
Lorenzo Romar	Head coach	10th	Washington (1980)
Raphael Chillious	Assistant coach	3rd	Lafayette (1996)
Paul Fortier	Assistant coach	7th	Washington (2003)
Jim Shaw	Assistant coach	8th	Western Oregon State (1985)
Lance LaVetter	Director of basketball operations	10th	Northern Arizona (1992)

== 2011–12 schedule and results ==
Date time, TV	Rank^{#}	Opponent^{#}	Result	Record	Site (attendance) city, state
Exhibition
11/04/2011*; 7:00 pm, RTNW		Seattle Pacific	W 77–60	–	Alaska Airlines Arena (9,481); Seattle, WA
Regular season
11/12/2011*; 2:00 pm		Georgia State; World Vision Classic	W 91–74	1–0	Alaska Airlines Arena (8,465); Seattle, WA
11/13/2011*; 5:00 pm		Florida Atlantic; World Vision Classic	W 77–71	2–0	Alaska Airlines Arena (7,972); Seattle, WA
11/14/2011*; 7:00 pm, RTNW		Portland; World Vision Classic	W 93–63	3–0	Alaska Airlines Arena (7,918); Seattle, WA
11/20/2011*; 9:00 am, CBSSN		at Saint Louis	L 64–77	3–1	Chaifetz Arena (6,761); St. Louis, MO
11/25/2011*; 3:00 pm		Houston Baptist	W 88–65	4–1	Alaska Airlines Arena (9,273); Seattle, WA
12/02/2011*; 8:00 pm, ESPNU		at Nevada	L 73–76 ^{OT}	4–2	Lawlor Events Center (4,722); Reno, NV
12/06/2011*; 6:30 pm, ESPN		vs. No. 11 Marquette; Jimmy V Classic	L 77–79	4–3	Madison Square Garden (8,231); New York, NY
12/10/2011*; 9:00 am, CBS		vs. No. 7 Duke; Carquest Auto Parts Classic	L 80–86	4–4	Madison Square Garden (15,525); New York, NY
12/16/2011*; 7:00 pm, RTNW		UC Santa Barbara	W 87–80	5–4	Alaska Airlines Arena (9,246); Seattle, WA
12/18/2011*; 12:00 pm, RTNW		South Dakota State	L 73–92	5–5	Alaska Airlines Arena (9,060); Seattle, WA
12/22/2011*; 7:00 pm		Cal State Northridge	W 74–51	6–5	Alaska Airlines Arena (9,348); Seattle, WA
12/29/2011; 6:00 pm, RTNW		Oregon State	W 95–80	7–5 (1–0)	Alaska Airlines Arena (9,592); Seattle, WA
12/31/2011; 7:00 pm, ESPN2		Oregon	W 76–60	8–5 (2–0)	Alaska Airlines Arena (9,597); Seattle, WA
01/05/2012; 6:00 pm, RTNW		at Colorado	L 69–87	8–6 (2–1)	Coors Events Center (7,110); Boulder, CO
01/07/2012; 11:00 am, FSN		at Utah	W 57–53	9–6 (3–1)	Jon M. Huntsman Center (8,887); Salt Lake City, UT
01/10/2012*; 7:00 pm, RTNW		Seattle	W 91–83	10–6	Alaska Airlines Arena (8,618); Seattle, WA
01/14/2012; 4:00 pm, FSN		Washington State	W 75–65	11–6 (4–1)	Alaska Airlines Arena (10,000); Seattle, WA
01/19/2012; 5:30 pm, RTNW		California	L 66–69	11–7 (4–2)	Alaska Airlines Arena (9,591); Seattle, WA
01/21/2012; 3:00 pm, RTNW		Stanford	W 76–63	12–7 (5–2)	Alaska Airlines Arena (9,794); Seattle, WA
01/26/2012; 5:30 pm, RTNW		at Arizona State	W 60–54	13–7 (6–2)	Wells Fargo Arena (6,794); Tempe, AZ
01/28/2012; 4:00 pm, ESPN		at Arizona; ESPN College GameDay	W 69–67	14–7 (7–2)	McKale Center (14,604); Tucson, AZ
02/02/2012; 6:00 pm, ESPN		UCLA	W 71–69	15–7 (8–2)	Alaska Airlines Arena (9,756); Seattle, WA
02/04/2012; 8:00 pm, FSN		USC	W 69–41	16–7 (9–2)	Alaska Airlines Arena (9,948); Seattle, WA
02/09/2012; 8:00 pm, FSN		at Oregon	L 57–82	16–8 (9–3)	Matthew Knight Arena (9,035); Eugene, OR
02/12/2012; 2:30 pm, FSN		at Oregon State	W 75–72	17–8 (10–3)	Gill Coliseum (8,027); Corvallis, OR
02/16/2012; 8:00 pm, FSN		Arizona State	W 77–69	18–8 (11–3)	Alaska Airlines Arena (9,820); Seattle, WA
02/18/2012; 12:00 pm, FSN		Arizona	W 79–70	19–8 (12–3)	Alaska Airlines Arena (10,000); Seattle, WA
02/25/2012; 5:00 pm, RTNW		at Washington State	W 59–55	20–8 (13–3)	Beasley Coliseum (9,325); Pullman, WA
03/01/2012; 7:30 pm		at USC	W 80–58	21–8 (14–3)	Galen Center (2,763); Los Angeles, CA
03/03/2012; 11:00 am, CBS		at UCLA	L 69–75	21–9 (14–4)	LA Sports Arena (9,785); Los Angeles, CA
2012 Pac-12 men's basketball tournament
03/08/2012; 12:10 pm, FSN		vs. Oregon State; Quarterfinals	L 84–86	21–10	Staples Center (8,780); Los Angeles, CA
2012 NIT
03/13/2012*; 7:00 pm, ESPNU		Texas–Arlington; First Round	W 82–72	22–10	Alaska Airlines Arena (2,801); Seattle, WA
03/16/2012*; 7:00 pm, ESPNU		Northwestern; Second Round	W 76–55	23–10	Alaska Airlines Arena (5,761); Seattle, WA
03/20/2012*; 6:00 pm, ESPN		Oregon; Quarterfinals	W 90–86	24–10	Alaska Airlines Arena (9,140); Seattle, WA
03/27/2012*; 6:00 pm, ESPN2		vs. Minnesota; Semifinals	L 67–68 ^{OT}	24–11	Madison Square Garden (7,574); New York, NY
*Non-conference game. ^{#}Rankings from AP Poll. (#) Tournament seedings in parentheses. All times are in Pacific Time.

== Notes ==
- March 5, 2012 – Guard Tony Wroten was named Pac-12 Freshman of the Year; Lorenzo Romar was the Pac-12 Coach of the Year.
