= 2011–12 Arizona State Sun Devils men's basketball team =

American college basketball season

2011–12 Arizona State Sun Devils men's basketball
- Conference: Pac-12 Conference
- Record: 10–21 (6–12 Pac-12)
- Head coach: Herb Sendek
- Assistant coaches: Dedrique Taylor; Scott Pera; Lamont Smith
- Home arena: Wells Fargo Arena

2011–12 Pac-12 Conference men's basketball standings
	Conf.				Overall
Team	W		L	PCT	W		L	PCT
Washington	14	–	4	.778	24	–	11	.686
California	13	–	5	.722	24	–	10	.706
Oregon	13	–	5	.722	24	–	10	.706
Arizona	12	–	6	.667	23	–	12	.657
Colorado †	11	–	7	.611	24	–	12	.667
UCLA	11	–	7	.611	19	–	14	.576
Stanford	10	–	8	.556	26	–	11	.703
Oregon State	7	–	11	.389	21	–	15	.583
Washington State	7	–	11	.389	19	–	18	.514
Arizona State	6	–	12	.333	10	–	21	.323
Utah	3	–	15	.167	6	–	25	.194
USC	1	–	17	.056	6	–	26	.188
† Conference tournament winner As of March 8, 2012; Rankings from AP poll

The 2011–12 Arizona State Sun Devils men's basketball team represented Arizona State University during the 2011–12 NCAA Division I men's basketball season. The head coach was Herb Sendek who was in his sixth season with the team. The Sun Devils played their home games at the Wells Fargo Arena and are members of the Pac-12 Conference. They finished with a record of 10–21 overall and 6–12 in Pac-12 play. They lost in the first round of the 2012 Pac-12 men's basketball tournament to Stanford.

== Roster ==
Number	Name	Position	Height	Weight	Year	Hometown	High School/Last College
0	Carrick Felix	Guard/Forward	6–6	196	Junior	Goodyear, AZ	College of Southern Idaho/Millennium HS
1	Jahii Carson	Guard	5–10	160	Freshman	Mesa, AZ	Mesa HS
2	Chris Colvin	Guard	6–2	200	Junior	Chicago, IL	Whitney Young Magnet HS
5	Kyle Cain	Forward	6–7	210	Sophomore	Chicago, IL	New Hampton School
10	Evan Gordon	Guard	6–3	200	Junior	Indianapolis, IN	Liberty
13	Jordan Bachynski	Center	7–2	243	Sophomore	Calgary, AB	Centennial HS
15	Chanse Creekmur	Guard/Forward	6–5	216	Sophomore	Marshalltown, IA	Marshalltown HS
21	Keala King	Guard	6–4	201	Sophomore	Compton, CA	Mater Dei HS
23	Ruslan Pateev	Center	7–0	249	Junior	Moscow, Russia	Montverde Academy
24	Trent Lockett	Guard	6–4	210	Junior	Golden Valley, MN	Hopkins HS
31	Jonathan Gilling	Forward	6–7	200	Freshman	Denmark	Denmark national basketball team
33	Dave Whitmore	Forward	6–6	215	Sophomore	Tempe, AZ	Corona Del Sol HS

== Schedule ==
Date time, TV	Rank^{#}	Opponent^{#}	Result	Record	Site (attendance) city, state
Exhibition
November 5, 2011*; 6:30 pm		at Grand Canyon	W 89–69	–	GCU Events Center (4,702); Phoenix, AZ
Regular season
November 11, 2011*; 2:30 pm		Montana State	W 78–72	1–0	Wells Fargo Arena (5,603); Tempe, AZ
November 15, 2011*; 6:30 pm		Pepperdine	L 60–66	1–1	Wells Fargo Arena (4,127); Tempe, AZ
November 18, 2011*; 6:30 pm, FSAZ		New Mexico	L 71–76	1–2	Wells Fargo Arena (5,046); Tempe, AZ
November 24, 2011*; 7:30 pm, ESPN2		vs. Fairfield; Old Spice Classic First Round	L 44–55	1–3	HP Field House (3,537); Orlando, FL
November 25, 2011*; 5:30 pm, ESPN2		vs. Wake Forest; Old Spice Classic loser bracket	W 84–56	2–3	HP Field House; Orlando, FL
November 27, 2011*; 12:30 pm, ESPNU		vs. DePaul; Old Spice Classic 5th place game	L 64–68	2–4	HP Field House (1,728); Orlando, FL
December 3, 2011*; 2:00 pm, CBSSN		at Tulsa	W 67–64	3–4	Reynolds Center (3,891); Tulsa, OK
December 7, 2011*; 6:30 pm		Nevada	L 61–69	3–5	Wells Fargo Arena (4,369); Tempe, AZ
December 10, 2011*; 2:00 pm		North Dakota State	W 60–57	4–5	Wells Fargo Arena (4,995); Tempe, AZ
December 17, 2011*; 4:00 pm, FSAZ		Northern Arizona	L 68–69	4–6	Wells Fargo Arena (4,738); Tempe, AZ
December 19, 2011*; 8:00 pm, FSN		Southern Miss	L 61–64	4–7	Wells Fargo Arena (4,738); Tempe, AZ
December 21, 2011*; 4:00 pm		Fresno State	L 65–68	4–8	Well Fargo Arena (4,552); Tempe, AZ
December 31, 2011; 3:30 pm, FSAZ		at Arizona	L 51–68	4–9 (0–1)	McKale Center (14,499); Tucson, AZ
January 5, 2012; 8:30 pm		at USC	W 62–53	5–9 (1–1)	Galen Center (3,112); Los Angeles, CA
January 7, 2012; 8:30 pm, FSAZ		vs. UCLA	L 58–75	5–10 (1–2)	Honda Center (9,076); Anaheim, CA
January 12, 2012; 8:30 pm, FSN		Oregon	L 58–67	5–11 (1–3)	Well Fargo Arena (5,609); Tempe, AZ
January 14, 2012; 6:00 pm, FSAZ		Oregon State	W 76–66	6–11 (2–3)	Well Fargo Arena (5,068); Tempe, AZ
January 19, 2012; 6:30 pm, RTRM		at Colorado	L 54–69	6–12 (2–4)	Coors Events Center (8,278); Boulder, CO
January 21, 2012; 3:00 pm		at Utah	L 43–64	6–13 (2–5)	Jon M. Huntsman Center (9,092); Salt Lake City, UT
January 26, 2012; 6:30 pm, FSAZ		Washington	L 54–60	6–14 (2–6)	Wells Fargo Arena (6,794); Tempe, AZ
January 28, 2012; 3:00 pm, FSAZ		Washington State	W 71–67	7–14 (3–6)	Wells Fargo Arena (6,224); Tempe, AZ
February 2, 2012; 8:00 pm		at Stanford	L 44–68	7–15 (3–7)	Maples Pavilion (4,719); Stanford, CA
February 4, 2012; 3:00 pm		at California	L 47–68	7–16 (3–8)	Haas Pavilion (8,859); Berkeley, CA
February 9, 2012; 6:30 pm		Utah	W 57–52	8–16 (4–8)	Wells Fargo Arena (5,002); Tempe, AZ
February 11, 2012; 4:30 pm, FSAZ		Colorado	L 49–63	8–17 (4–9)	Wells Fargo Arena (5,201); Tempe, AZ
February 16, 2012; 9:00 pm, FSN		at Washington	L 69–77	8–18 (4–10)	Alaska Airlines Arena (9,820); Seattle, WA
February 18, 2012; 6:00 pm, RTNW		at Washington State	L 50–72	8–19 (4–11)	Beasley Coliseum (5,218); Pullman, WA
February 23, 2012; 6:30 pm		UCLA	L 57–66	8–20 (4–12)	Wells Fargo Arena (5,477); Tempe, AZ
February 25, 2012; 6:00 pm, FSAZ		USC	W 56–52	9–20 (5–12)	Wells Fargo Arena (6,316); Tempe, AZ
March 4, 2012; 1:30 pm, FSN		Arizona	W 87–80	10–20 (6–12)	Wells Fargo Arena (7,864); Tempe, AZ
Pac-12 tournament
March 7, 2012; 7:10 pm, FSN	(10)	vs. (7) Stanford; First Round	L 65–85	10–21	Staples Center; Los Angeles, CA
*Non-conference game. ^{#}Rankings from AP Poll. (#) Tournament seedings in parentheses. All times are in Mountain Time.
