= 2011–12 Cal State Bakersfield Roadrunners men's basketball team =

American college basketball season

2011–12 Cal State Bakersfield Roadrunners men's basketball
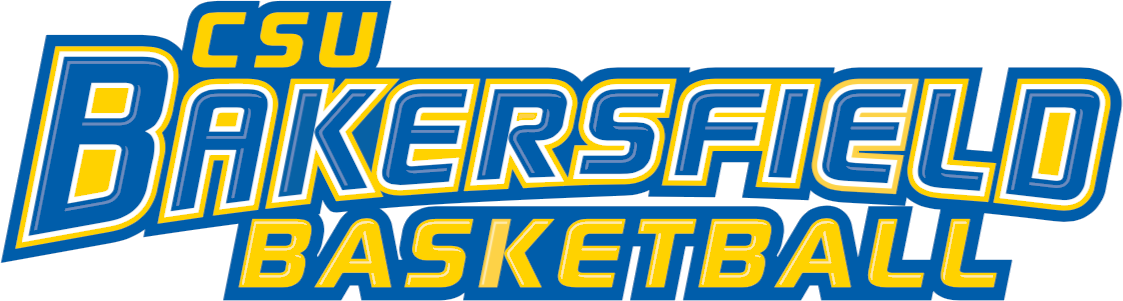

CIT, First Round
- Conference: Independent
- Record: 16–15
- Head coach: Rod Barnes (1st season)
- Assistant coaches: Bryan Goodman; Jeff Conarroe; Kevin Missouri
- Home arena: Icardo Center; Rabobank Arena

2011–12 NCAA Division I men's basketball independents standings
	Conf.				Overall
Team	W		L	PCT	W		L	PCT
Cal State Bakersfield		–		–	16	–	15	.516
Seattle		–		–	12	–	15	.444
Nebraska–Omaha		–		–	11	–	18	.379
Longwood		–		–	10	–	21	.323
Rankings from AP Poll

The 2011–12 Cal State Bakersfield Roadrunners men's basketball team represented California State University, Bakersfield during the 2011–12 NCAA Division I men's basketball season. The Roadrunners, led by first year head coach Rod Barnes, played their home games at the Icardo Center, with two home games at Rabobank Arena, and played as an independent. The Roadrunners were invited to the 2012 CollegeInsider Tournament for the programs first ever post season appearance since joining Division I. They lost in the first round to Utah State.

== Roster ==
Number	Name	Position	Height	Weight	Year	Hometown
1	Tyrone White	Guard/Forward	6–7	185	Junior	Portland, Oregon
2	Brandon Barnes	Guard	6–1	195	Sophomore	Atlanta, Georgia
3	Kwai Pearson	Guard	6–0	177	Freshman	Chicago, Illinois
5	Zachary Lamb	Guard	6–3	180	Junior	Norcross, Georgia
10	Ivan Matip	Guard	6–3	205	Sophomore	Yaoundé, Cameroon
11	Mo Hughley	Forward	6–7	240	Junior	Queens Village, New York
12	Issiah Grayson	Guard	5–11	165	Junior	Atlanta, Georgia
13	Javonte Maynor	Guard	6–0	175	Sophomore	Snellville, Georgia
15	Kregg Jones	Forward	6–8	235	Sophomore	Saint George, Barbados
21	Adam Young	Forward	6–8	235	Junior	Las Vegas, Nevada
22	Robert Hayes	Guard	5–10	186	Senior	San Diego, California
23	Donald Johnson	Forward	6–8	215	Senior	Lancaster, California
24	Andre Jackson	Center	6–10	285	Junior	Dallas, Texas
33	Rashad Savage	Forward	6–6	220	Senior	Philadelphia, Pennsylvania
44	Stephon Carter	Guard	6–3	180	Junior	Bakersfield, California

== Schedule ==
Date time, TV	Rank^{#}	Opponent^{#}	Result	Record	Site (attendance) city, state
Exhibition
11/09/2011; 7:00 pm		Whittier College	W 85–67		Icardo Center (935); Bakersfield, CA
Regular Season
11/12/2011; 1:30 pm		at Oregon State	L 62–86	0–1	Gill Coliseum (5,423); Corvallis, OR
11/16/2011; 7:00 pm		at Cal Poly	W 60–58	1–1	Mott Gym (1,505); San Luis Obispo, CA
11/19/2011; 7:00 pm		Pepperdine	W 79–70	2–1	Icardo Center (1,748); Bakersfield, CA
11/26/2011; 6:00 pm		at Cal State Fullerton	W 73–66	3–1	Titan Gym (634); Fullerton, CA
11/30/2011; 7:00 pm		at Cal State Northridge	W 74–67	4–1	Matadome (1,196); Northridge, CA
12/03/2011; 6:00 pm		at Montana State	L 67–71	4–2	Worthington Arena (1,196); Bozeman, MT
12/07/2011; 7:00 pm		Sacramento State	W 63–60	5–2	Icardo Center (1,269); Bakersfield, CA
12/10/2011; 5:30 pm		at Northern Arizona	L 67–80	5–3	Rolle Activity Center (607); Flagstaff, AZ
12/15/2011; 7:00 pm		at Portland State	L 87–91	5–4	Stott Center (602); Portland, OR
12/17/2011; 7:00 pm		at Idaho	L 44–72	5–5	Cowan Spectrum (815); Moscow, ID
12/19/2011; 6:00 pm		at Colorado	L 64–70	5–6	Coors Events Center (5,531); Boulder, CO
12/22/2011; 7:00 pm		Pacific	W 83–53	6–6	Icardo Center (805); Bakersfield, CA
12/27/2011; 5:00 pm, FSSW		at Texas Tech	L 58–74	6–7	United Spirit Arena (10,678); Lubbock, TX
12/30/2011; 7:00 pm		Pomona	W 75–41	7–7	Icardo Center (2,330); Bakersfield, CA
01/02/2012; 7:00 pm		New Mexico State	L 72–73	7–8	Icardo Center (1,262); Bakersfield, CA
01/05/2012; 7:00 pm		No. 17 UNLV	L 57–89	7–9	Rabobank Arena (3,325); Bakersfield, CA
01/07/2012; 7:00 pm		Texas–Pan American	W 72–57	8–9	Icardo Center (1,184); Bakersfield, CA
01/10/2012; 7:00 pm		NJIT	W 71–70	9–9	Icardo Center (1,178); Bakersfield, CA
01/14/2012; 7:00 pm		Cal State Fullerton	W 67–65	10–9	Icardo Center (1,234); Bakersfield, CA
01/17/2012; 7:30 pm		at Pacific	W 76–73	11–9	Alex G. Spanos Center (1,757); Stockton, CA
01/23/2012; 7:00 pm		at San Jose State	L 70–78	11–10	Event Center Arena (1,372); San Jose, CA
01/28/2012; 7:00 pm		Cal State Northridge	L 68–76	11–11	Icardo Center (1,372); Bakersfield, CA
02/01/2012; 5:30 pm		at New Mexico State	L 57–78	11–12	Pan American Center (5,049); Las Cruces, NM
02/04/2012; 7:00 pm		Cal Poly	W 69–66	12–12	Icardo Center (1,663); Bakersfield, CA
02/08/2012; 5:00 pm		at Texas–Pan American	L 67–73	12–13	UTPA Fieldhouse (1,184); Edinburg, TX
02/12/2012; 12:00 pm		at Nebraska–Omaha	W 75–65	13–13	Lee & Helene Sapp Fieldhouse (1,379); Omaha, NE
02/14/2012; 7:00 pm		at Nevada	L 47–61	13–14	Lawlor Events Center (4,214); Reno, NV
02/18/2012; 7:00 pm		San Diego	W 72–63	14–14	Rabobank Arena (2,305); Bakersfield, CA
02/22/2012; 4:00 pm		at NJIT	W 72–70 ^{OT}	15–14	Fleisher Center (602); Newark, NJ
02/25/2012; 7:00 pm		Nebraska–Omaha	W 84–63	16–14	Icardo Center (1,325); Bakersfield, CA
2012 CIT
03/14/2012; 7:00 pm		at Utah State; First Round	L 69–75	16–15	Smith Spectrum (2,141); Logan, UT
*Non-conference game. ^{#}Rankings from AP Poll. (#) Tournament seedings in parentheses. All times are in Pacific Time.
