= 2011–12 UCLA Bruins men's basketball team =

American college basketball season

2011–12 UCLA Bruins men's basketball
- Conference: Pac-12 Conference
- Record: 19–14 (11–7 Pac-12)
- Head coach: Ben Howland (9th season)
- Assistant coaches: Korey McCray; Phil Mathews; Scott Garson
- Home arena: Los Angeles Memorial Sports Arena

2011–12 Pac-12 Conference men's basketball standings
	Conf.				Overall
Team	W		L	PCT	W		L	PCT
Washington	14	–	4	.778	24	–	11	.686
California	13	–	5	.722	24	–	10	.706
Oregon	13	–	5	.722	24	–	10	.706
Arizona	12	–	6	.667	23	–	12	.657
Colorado †	11	–	7	.611	24	–	12	.667
UCLA	11	–	7	.611	19	–	14	.576
Stanford	10	–	8	.556	26	–	11	.703
Oregon State	7	–	11	.389	21	–	15	.583
Washington State	7	–	11	.389	19	–	18	.514
Arizona State	6	–	12	.333	10	–	21	.323
Utah	3	–	15	.167	6	–	25	.194
USC	1	–	17	.056	6	–	26	.188
† Conference tournament winner As of March 8, 2012; Rankings from AP poll

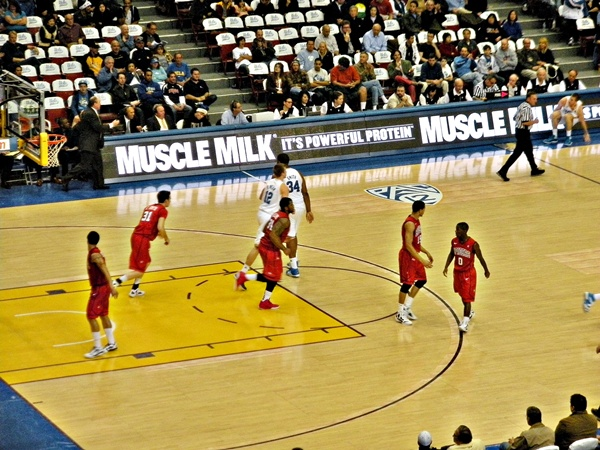
UCLA vs. Richmond, Los Angeles Sports Arena

The 2011–12 UCLA Bruins men's basketball team represented the University of California, Los Angeles during the 2011–12 NCAA Division I men's basketball season. The Bruins competed in the Pac-12 Conference and were led by head coach Ben Howland. The team ended the season with a 19–14 record and did not participate in the NCAA National Championship tournament or the NIT.

== Recruiting class ==
College recruiting information
Name	Hometown	School	Height	Weight	Commit date
Norman Powell; SG	San Diego, CA	Lincoln Senior HS	6 ft 3.5 in (1.92 m)	177.5 lb (80.5 kg)	Nov 10, 2010
Norman Powell; SG	Recruit ratings: Scout: Rivals: (?)				
De'End Parker; SG	San Francisco, CA	CC of San Francisco	6 ft 5 in (1.96 m)	200 lb (91 kg)	Mar 5, 2011
De'End Parker; SG	Recruit ratings: Scout: Rivals: (?)				
Larry Drew II; PG	Woodland Hills, CA	William Howard Taft HS/University of North Carolina	6 ft 2 in (1.88 m)	180 lb (82 kg)	
Larry Drew II; PG	Recruit ratings: Scout: Rivals: (0)				
Overall recruit ranking:
Note: In many cases, Scout, Rivals, 247Sports, On3, and ESPN may conflict in their listings of height and weight.; In these cases, the average was taken. ESPN grades are on a 100-point scale.; Sources: "2011 Team Ranking". Rivals.

== Roster ==
2011–12 UCLA Bruins men's basketball team
Players
Coaches

Pos.	#	Name	Height	Weight	Year	Previous school	Hometown
C	0	Anthony Stover	6 ft 10 in (2.08 m)	235 lb (107 kg)	RS So	Windward School	Pasadena, California
G	1	Tyler Lamb	6 ft 5 in (1.96 m)	200 lb (91 kg)	So	Mater Dei H.S.	Santa Ana, California
G	2	Kenny Jones	6 ft 0 in (1.83 m)	190 lb (86 kg)	RS Jr	St. Bernard H.S.	Los Angeles, California
G	3	Nick Kazemi	6 ft 2 in (1.88 m)	175 lb (79 kg)	Fr	Tustin H.S.	Santa Ana, California
G	4	Norman Powell	6 ft 3 in (1.91 m)	200 lb (91 kg)	Fr	Lincoln H.S.	San Diego, California
G	5	Jerime Anderson	6 ft 2 in (1.88 m)	183 lb (83 kg)	Sr	Canyon H.S.	Anaheim, California
G	10	Larry Drew II (redshirt)	6 ft 2 in (1.88 m)	180 lb (82 kg)	Sr	William H. Taft H.S.	Encino, California
G	11	Lazeric Jones	6 ft 1 in (1.85 m)	187 lb (85 kg)	Sr	John A. Logan College	Chicago, Illinois
F	12	David Wear	6 ft 10 in (2.08 m)	225 lb (102 kg)	RS So	Mater Dei H.S.	Huntington Beach, California
G	13	Matt DeMarcus	6 ft 3 in (1.91 m)	203 lb (92 kg)	Sr	Santa Ynez Valley Union H.S.	Solvang, California
F	20	Brendan Lane	6 ft 9 in (2.06 m)	223 lb (101 kg)	Jr	Rocklin H.S.	Rocklin, California
SG	21	De'End Parker	6 ft 6 in (1.98 m)	215 lb (98 kg)	Fr	City College of San Francisco	San Francisco, California
F	22	Reeves Nelson (D)	6 ft 8 in (2.03 m)	235 lb (107 kg)	Jr	Modesto Christian H.S.	Modesto, California
F	24	Travis Wear	6 ft 10 in (2.08 m)	220 lb (100 kg)	RS So	Mater Dei H.S.	Huntington Beach, California
G	30	Khalid McCaskill	6 ft 5 in (1.96 m)	185 lb (84 kg)	Fr	Brewster Academy	Harlem, NY
C	34	Joshua Smith	6 ft 10 in (2.08 m)	305 lb (138 kg)	So	Kentwood H.S.	Kent, Washington
G	44	Tyler Trapani	6 ft 0 in (1.83 m)	190 lb (86 kg)	Sr	Simi Valley H.S.	Simi Valley, California

Head coach

- Ben Howland (Weber State)

Assistant coach(es)

- Scott Garson (UC Santa Barbara)
- Phil Mathews (UC Irvine)
- Korey McCray (Mercer)

Legend

- (C) Team captain
- (S) Suspended
- (I) Ineligible
- (W) Walk-on
- (D) Dismissed
- Injured
- Current redshirt

Roster
Last update: 2011-03-17

== Schedule ==
Date time, TV	Rank^{#}	Opponent^{#}	Result	Record	Site (attendance) city, state
Exhibition
November 6, 2011*; 2:00 pm	No. 17	vs. Cal State San Bernardino	W 80–72	–	Citizens Business Bank Arena (6,259); Ontario, CA
Regular Season
November 11, 2011*; 7:30 pm, FS West	No. 17	Loyola Marymount	L 58–69	0–1	LA Sports Arena (5,382 ) Los Angeles, CA
November 15, 2011*; 8:00 pm, ESPNU		Middle Tennessee State; Maui Invitational Opening Round	L 68–88	0–2	LA Sports Arena (4,758); Los Angeles, CA
November 21, 2011*; 6:30 pm, ESPNU		vs. Chaminade; Maui Invitational First Round	W 92–60	1–2	Lahaina Civic Center (2,400); Maui, HI
November 22, 2011*; 6:30 pm, ESPN		vs. No. 14 Kansas; Maui Invitational seminfinals	L 56–72	1–3	Lahaina Civic Center (2,400); Maui, HI
November 23, 2011*; 4:30 pm, ESPN		vs. No. 15 Michigan; Maui Invitational 3rd place game	L 63–79	1–4	Lahaina Civic Center (2,400); Maui, HI
November 28, 2011*; 8:00 pm, Prime Ticket		Pepperdine	W 62–39	2–4	LA Sports Arena (3,885); Los Angeles, CA
December 3, 2011*; 1:30 pm, FSN/PT		Texas	L 59–69	2–5	LA Sports Arena (6,177); Los Angeles, CA
December 10, 2011*; 4:00 pm, FS West		vs. Penn	W 77–73	3–5	Honda Center (6,332 ) Anaheim, CA
December 14, 2011*; 7:30 pm, FS West		Eastern Washington	W 60–47	4–5	LA Sports Arena (4,229 ) Los Angeles, CA
December 17, 2011*; 12:00 pm, Prime Ticket		vs. UC Davis	W 82–39	5–5	Honda Center (5,132); Anaheim, CA
December 20, 2011*; 7:30 pm, Prime Ticket		UC Irvine	W 89–60	6–5	LA Sports Arena (4,090 ) Los Angeles, CA
December 23, 2011*; 7:30 pm, Prime Ticket		Richmond	W 71–63	7–5	LA Sports Arena (4,194 ) Los Angeles, CA
December 29, 2011; 7:30 pm, FSN/PT		at Stanford	L 59–60	7–6 (0–1)	Maples Pavilion (6,777); Stanford, CA
December 31, 2011; 1:00 pm, FSN/PT		at California	L 69–85	7–7 (0–2)	Haas Pavilion (9,750); Berkeley, CA
January 5, 2012; 8:00 pm, FSN/PT		vs. Arizona; John R. Wooden Classic	W 65–58	8–7 (1–2)	Honda Center (9,247); Anaheim, CA
January 7, 2012; 7:30 pm, FS West		vs. Arizona State	W 75–58	9–7 (2–2)	Honda Center (9,076 ) Anaheim, CA
January 15, 2012; 6:00 pm, FSN/PT		at USC	W 66–47	10–7 (3–2)	Galen Center (8,474 ) Los Angeles, CA
January 19, 2012; 7:30 pm, FSN/PT		at Oregon State	L 84–87	10–8 (3–3)	Gill Coliseum (6,019 ) Corvallis, OR
January 21, 2012; 1:00 pm, FSN/FSW		at Oregon	L 68–75	10–9 (3–4)	Matthew Knight Arena (10,830 ) Eugene, OR
January 26, 2012; 7:30 pm, Prime Ticket		Utah	W 76–49	11–9 (4–4)	LA Sports Arena (4,434 ) Los Angeles, CA
January 28, 2012; 1:00 pm, Prime Ticket		Colorado	W 77–60	12–9 (5–4)	LA Sports Arena (9,253); Los Angeles, CA
February 2, 2012; 6:00 pm, ESPN		at Washington	L 69–71	12–10 (5–5)	Alaska Airlines Arena (9,756 ) Seattle, WA
February 4, 2012; 2:00 pm, RTNW		at Washington State	W 63–60	13–10 (6–5)	Beasley Coliseum (4,204 ) Pullman, WA
February 9, 2012; 8:00 pm, Prime Ticket		Stanford	W 72–61	14–10 (7–5)	LA Sports Arena (5,207 ) Los Angeles, CA
February 11, 2012; 1:00 pm, FSN/PT		California	L 63–73	14–11 (7–6)	LA Sports Arena (9,001 ) Los Angeles, CA
February 15, 2012; 7:30 pm, Prime Ticket		USC	W 64–54	15–11 (8–6)	LA Sports Arena (9,064 ) Los Angeles, CA
February 18, 2012*; 10:00 am, CBS		at St. John's	L 63–66	15–12	Madison Square Garden (7,305 ) New York City, NY
February 23, 2012; 5:30 pm		at Arizona State	W 66–57	16–12 (9–6)	Wells Fargo Arena (5,477 ) Tempe, AZ
February 25, 2012; 11:00 am, CBS		at Arizona	L 63–65	16–13 (9–7)	McKale Center (14,724 ) Tucson, AZ
March 1, 2012; 7:30 pm		Washington State	W 78–46	17–13 (10–7)	LA Sports Arena (5,099 ) Los Angeles, CA
March 3, 2012; 11:00 am, CBS		Washington	W 75–69	18–13 (11–7)	LA Sports Arena (9,785 ) Los Angeles, CA
Pac-12 Tournament
March 7, 2012; 2:40 pm, FSN	(5)	vs. (12) USC; First Round	W 55–40	19–13	Staples Center (5,973 ) Los Angeles, CA
March 8, 2012; 2:40 pm, FSN	(5)	vs. (4) Arizona; Quarterfinals	L 58–66	19–14	Staples Center (8,780 ) Los Angeles, CA
*Non-conference game. ^{#}Rankings from AP Poll. (#) Tournament seedings in parentheses. All times are in Pacific Time.

== Rankings ==
UCLA was ranked No. 20 in the preseason Coaches' Poll. They were also the media's preseason pick to win the Pac-12 conference title.

== See also ==
- List of UCLA Bruins in the NBA

== Notes ==
- March 27, 2011 – Tyler Honeycutt leaving UCLA to enter 2011 NBA Draft
- March 27, 2011 – Former North Carolina Tarheels Point Guard Larry Drew II enrolls at UCLA
- April 13, 2011 – Malcolm Lee announced he would forgo his final year of college eligibility and hire an agent and enter the 2011 NBA draft.
- June 7, 2011 – Korey McCray was hired as a new assistant coach, replacing Scott Duncan.
- December 9, 2011 – Reeves Nelson was dismissed from the team after his second indefinite suspension for conduct issues. The 6-foot-9 junior forward led the Bruins in scoring (13.9) and rebounding (9.1) in 2010–11 when he was named All-Pac-10.
- March 5, 2012 – Guard Lazeric Jones was named Pac-12 Men's Basketball Player of the Week for Feb. 27 – March 4; Jones was named to the All-Pac-12 second team and David Wear received honorable mention.
