= 2011–12 Virginia Cavaliers men's basketball team =

American college basketball season

2011–12 Virginia Cavaliers men's basketball

NCAA tournament, round of 64
- Conference: Atlantic Coast Conference
- Record: 22–10 (9–7 ACC)
- Head coach: Tony Bennett (3rd season)
- Associate head coach: Ritchie McKay (3rd season)
- Assistant coaches: Ron Sanchez (3rd season); Jason Williford (3rd season)
- Home arena: John Paul Jones Arena

2011–12 ACC men's basketball standings
| | Conf. | | | | Overall |
| Team | W | | L | PCT | W | | L | PCT |
|---|---|---|---|---|---|---|---|---|
| No. 6 North Carolina | 14 | – | 2 | .875 | 32 | – | 6 | .842 |
| No. 14 Duke | 13 | – | 3 | .813 | 27 | – | 7 | .794 |
| No. 15 Florida State† | 12 | – | 4 | .750 | 25 | – | 10 | .714 |
| Virginia | 9 | – | 7 | .563 | 22 | – | 10 | .688 |
| No. 20 NC State | 9 | – | 7 | .563 | 24 | – | 13 | .649 |
| Miami (FL) | 9 | – | 7 | .563 | 20 | – | 13 | .606 |
| Clemson | 8 | – | 8 | .500 | 16 | – | 15 | .516 |
| Maryland | 6 | – | 10 | .375 | 17 | – | 15 | .531 |
| Virginia Tech | 4 | – | 12 | .250 | 16 | – | 17 | .485 |
| Wake Forest | 4 | – | 12 | .250 | 13 | – | 18 | .419 |
| Georgia Tech | 4 | – | 12 | .250 | 11 | – | 20 | .355 |
| Boston College | 4 | – | 12 | .250 | 9 | – | 22 | .290 |
† 2012 ACC tournament winner As of April 3, 2012; Rankings from Coaches Poll

The 2011–12 Virginia Cavaliers men's basketball team represented the University of Virginia during the 2011–12 NCAA Division I men's basketball season. The Cavaliers, led by third-year head coach Tony Bennett, played their home games at John Paul Jones Arena and were members of the Atlantic Coast Conference. They finished the season 22–10, 9–7 in ACC play to finish in a three way tie for fourth place. They lost in the quarterfinals of the ACC Basketball tournament to North Carolina State. They received an at-large bid to the 2012 NCAA tournament, where they lost in the first round to Florida.

The team was led by senior forward Mike Scott, who finished the season as a first team All-ACC Selection and runner up for the Conference Player of the Year.

== Previous season ==
The Cavaliers finished the 2010–11 season 16–15 overall, 7–9 in ACC play, and lost in the first round of the ACC tournament to Miami.

== Roster ==
In December 2011, both KT Harrell and Johnson transferred from Virginia, to Auburn and San Diego State, respectively.

2011–12 Virginia Cavaliers men's basketball team
Players
Coaches

| Pos. | # | Name | Height | Weight | Year | Previous school | Hometown |
|---|---|---|---|---|---|---|---|
| G | 0 | Doug Browman | 5 ft 11 in (1.8 m) | 176 lb (80 kg) | Jr | Montrose Christian | Midlothian, VA |
| G | 1 | Jontel Evans | 5 ft 11 in (1.8 m) | 188 lb (85 kg) | Jr | Bethel | Hampton, VA |
| G | 2 | Paul Jesperson | 6 ft 6 in (1.98 m) | 197 lb (89 kg) | Fr | Merrill | Merrill, WI |
| G | 4 | Ryan Wright | 5 ft 10 in (1.78 m) | 150 lb (68 kg) | Fr | Bullis School | Upper Marlboro, MD |
| C | 5 | Assene Sene (C) | 7 ft 0 in (2.13 m) | 239 lb (108 kg) | Sr | South Kent School | Saint-Louis, Senegal |
| G | 11 | Rob Vozenilek (W) | 6 ft 2 in (1.88 m) | 185 lb (84 kg) | Fr | St. Christopher's | Richmond, VA |
| G | 12 | Joe Harris | 6 ft 6 in (1.98 m) | 211 lb (96 kg) | So | Chelan | Chelan, WA |
| G | 13 | Sammy Zeglinski (C) | 6 ft 1 in (1.85 m) | 184 lb (83 kg) | Sr | William Penn Charter | Philadelphia, PA |
| F | 21 | Angus Mitchell (W) | 6 ft 6 in (1.98 m) | 205 lb (93 kg) | Jr | St. John's School | Houston, TX |
| G | 22 | Malcolm Brogdon | 6 ft 5 in (1.96 m) | 215 lb (98 kg) | Fr | Greater Atlanta Christian | Norcross, GA |
| F | 23 | Mike Scott (C) | 6 ft 8 in (2.03 m) | 237 lb (108 kg) | RS Sr | Deep Creek/Hargrave Military | Chesapeake, VA |
| G | 24 | KT Harrell | 6 ft 4 in (1.93 m) | 202 lb (92 kg) | So | Brewbaker Technology | Montgomery, AL |
| G | 25 | Akil Mitchell | 6 ft 8 in (2.03 m) | 234 lb (106 kg) | So | Charlotte Christian | Charlotte, NC |
| G | 30 | Thomas Rogers (W) | 6 ft 6 in (1.98 m) | 209 lb (95 kg) | So | Fork Union Military | Farmville, VA |
| G | 32 | Darion Atkins | 6 ft 8 in (2.03 m) | 222 lb (101 kg) | Fr | Landon School | Clinton, MD |
| F | 34 | James Johnson | 6 ft 9 in (2.06 m) | 238 lb (108 kg) | RS Fr | Elsinore | Wildomar, CA |

Head coach

- Tony Bennett (Green Bay)

Assistant coach(es)

- Ritchie McKay (Seattle Pacific)
- Ron Sanchez (SUNY-Oneonta)
- Jason Williford (Virginia)

Strength and conditioning coach(es)

- Mike Curtis (Virginia)

Athletic trainer(s)

- Ethan Saliba (Kansas)

Legend

- (C) Team captain
- (S) Suspended
- (I) Ineligible
- (W) Walk-on
- Injured
- Current redshirt

Roster
Last update: 14 October 2014

== Schedule ==
| Date time, TV | Rank^{#} | Opponent^{#} | Result | Record | Site (attendance) city, state |
Non-conference regular season
| Nov. 13*; 2:00 pm, ESPN3 | | South Carolina State | W 75–38 | 1–0 | John Paul Jones Arena (8,954); Charlottesville, VA |
| Nov. 15*; 7:00 pm, CSN+ | | Winthrop | W 69–48 | 2–0 | John Paul Jones Arena (7,983); Charlottesville, VA |
| Nov. 18*; 6:00 pm | | vs. TCU; Paradise Jam | L 55–57 | 2–1 | Sports and Fitness Center (NA); Saint Thomas, USVI |
| Nov. 19*; 3:30 pm | | vs. Drexel; Paradise Jam | W 49–35 | 3–1 | Sports and Fitness Center (NA); Saint Thomas, USVI |
| Nov. 21*; 7:00 pm | | vs. Drake; Paradise Jam | W 60–52 | 4–1 | Sports and Fitness Center (2,322); Saint Thomas, USVI |
| Nov. 25*; 7:00 pm, ESPNU | | Green Bay | W 68–42 | 5–1 | John Paul Jones Arena (9,113); Charlottesville, VA |
| Nov. 29*; 7:00 pm, ESPN2 | | No. 15 Michigan; ACC–Big Ten Challenge | W 70–58 | 6–1 | John Paul Jones Arena (10,564); Charlottesville, VA |
| Dec. 3*; 1:00 pm, ESPN3 | | Longwood | W 86–53 | 7–1 | John Paul Jones Arena (8,352); Charlottesville, VA |
| Dec. 6*; 7:00 pm, ESPN3 | | George Mason | W 68–48 | 8–1 | John Paul Jones Arena (8,954); Charlottesville, VA |
| Dec. 18*; 5:30 pm, FSN | | at Oregon | W 67–54 | 9–1 | Matthew Knight Arena (8,750); Eugene, OR |
| Dec. 21*; 10:00 pm, RTNW | No. 24 | at Seattle | W 83–77 | 10–1 | KeyArena (3,541); Seattle, WA |
| Dec. 27*; 7:00 pm | No. 23 | Maryland Eastern Shore | W 69–42 | 11–1 | John Paul Jones Arena (8,661); Charlottesville, VA |
| Dec. 30*; 7:00 pm, ESPN3 | No. 23 | Towson | W 57–50 | 12–1 | John Paul Jones Arena (8,751); Charlottesville, VA |
| Jan. 2*; 7:00 pm, CST | No. 21 | at LSU | W 57–52 | 13–1 | Maravich Assembly Center (8,810); Baton Rouge, LA |
Conference regular season
| Jan. 7; 6:00 pm, ESPNU | No. 21 | Miami (FL) | W 52–51 | 14–1 (1–0) | John Paul Jones Arena (11,283); Charlottesville, VA |
| Jan. 12; 9:00 pm, ESPN | No. 17 | at No. 8 Duke | L 58–61 | 14–2 (1–1) | Cameron Indoor Stadium (9,314); Durham, NC |
| Jan. 19; 8:00 pm, ACCN | No. 15 | at Georgia Tech | W 70–38 | 15–2 (2–1) | Philips Arena (5,885); Atlanta, GA |
| Jan. 22; 6:00 pm, ESPNU | No. 15 | Virginia Tech | L 45–47 | 15–3 (2–2) | John Paul Jones Arena (14,021); Charlottesville, VA |
| Jan. 26; 9:00 pm, ESPNU | No. 19 | Boston College | W 66–49 | 16–3 (3–2) | John Paul Jones Arena (9,827); Charlottesville, VA |
| Jan. 28; 8:00 pm, ESPN2 | No. 19 | at NC State | W 61–60 | 17–3 (4–2) | RBC Center (17,027); Raleigh, NC |
| Jan. 31; 7:00 pm, ESPN2 | No. 16 | Clemson | W 65–61 | 18–3 (5–2) | John Paul Jones Arena (10,919); Charlottesville, VA |
| Feb. 4; 1:00 pm, ACCN | No. 16 | at No. 21 Florida State | L 55–58 | 18–4 (5–3) | Donald L. Tucker Center (11,757); Tallahassee, FL |
| Feb. 8; 7:30 pm, ESPN3 | No. 19 | Wake Forest | W 68–44 | 19–4 (6–3) | John Paul Jones Arena (10,786); Charlottesville, VA |
| Feb. 11; 1:00 pm, ACCN | No. 19 | at No. 5 North Carolina | L 52–70 | 19–5 (6–4) | Dean E. Smith Center (20,496); Chapel Hill, NC |
| Feb. 14; 7:00 pm, ESPNU | No. 22 | at Clemson | L 48–60 | 19–6 (6–5) | Littlejohn Coliseum (10,000); Clemson, SC |
| Feb. 18; 1:00 pm, ACCN | No. 22 | Maryland | W 71–44 | 20–6 (7–5) | John Paul Jones Arena (14,101); Charlottesville, VA |
| Feb. 21; 9:00 pm, ESPNU | No. 25 | at Virginia Tech | W 61–59 | 21–6 (8–5) | Cassell Coliseum (9,656); Blacksburg, VA |
| Feb. 25; 4:00 pm, ESPN | No. 25 | No. 7 North Carolina | L 51–54 | 21–7 (8–6) | John Paul Jones Arena (14,273); Charlottesville, VA |
| Mar. 1; 7:00 pm, ESPN2 | No. 24 | No. 22 Florida State | L 60–63 | 21–8 (8–7) | John Paul Jones Arena (11,807); Charlottesville, VA |
| Mar. 4; 9:00 pm, ACCN | No. 24 | at Maryland | W 75–72 ^{OT} | 22–8 (9–7) | Comcast Center (16,497); College Park, MD |
ACC Tournament
| Mar. 9; 2:00 pm, ESPN2/ACCN | (4) | vs. (5) NC State; Quarterfinals | L 64–67 | 22–9 | Philips Arena (19,520); Atlanta, GA |
NCAA tournament
| Mar. 16*; 2:10 pm, TNT | (10 W) | vs. (7 W) No. 25 Florida; Second Round | L 45–71 | 22–10 | CenturyLink Center Omaha (16,494); Omaha, NE |
*Non-conference game. ^{#}Rankings from AP Poll. (#) Tournament seedings in parentheses. All times are in Eastern Time (#) during NCAA Tournament is seed with Region.

== Rankings ==
Ranking movement Legend: ██ Improvement in ranking. ██ Decrease in ranking. ██ Not ranked the previous week. RV=Others receiving votes.
| Poll | Pre | Wk 1 | Wk 2 | Wk 3 | Wk 4 | Wk 5 | Wk 6 | Wk 7 | Wk 8 | Wk 9 | Wk 10 | Wk 11 | Wk 12 | Wk 13 | Wk 14 | Wk 15 | Wk 16 | Wk 17 | Wk 18 | Wk 19 |
|---|---|---|---|---|---|---|---|---|---|---|---|---|---|---|---|---|---|---|---|---|
| AP | NR | NR | NR | NR | NR | RV | 24 | 23 | 21 | 16 | 15 | 19 | 16 | 19 | 22 | 25 | 24 | RV | RV | |
| Coaches | RV | RV | NR | NR | RV | RV | RV | 24 | 23 | 17 | 17 | 21 | 18 | 20 | 22 | RV | RV | RV | RV | NR |

== Team players drafted into the NBA ==
| Year | Round | Pick | Player | NBA club |
| 2012 | 2 | 43 | Mike Scott | Atlanta Hawks |
| 2014 | 2 | 33 | Joe Harris | Cleveland Cavaliers |
| 2016 | 2 | 36 | Malcolm Brogdon | Milwaukee Bucks |
