= Angelo Chol =

South Sudanese basketball player

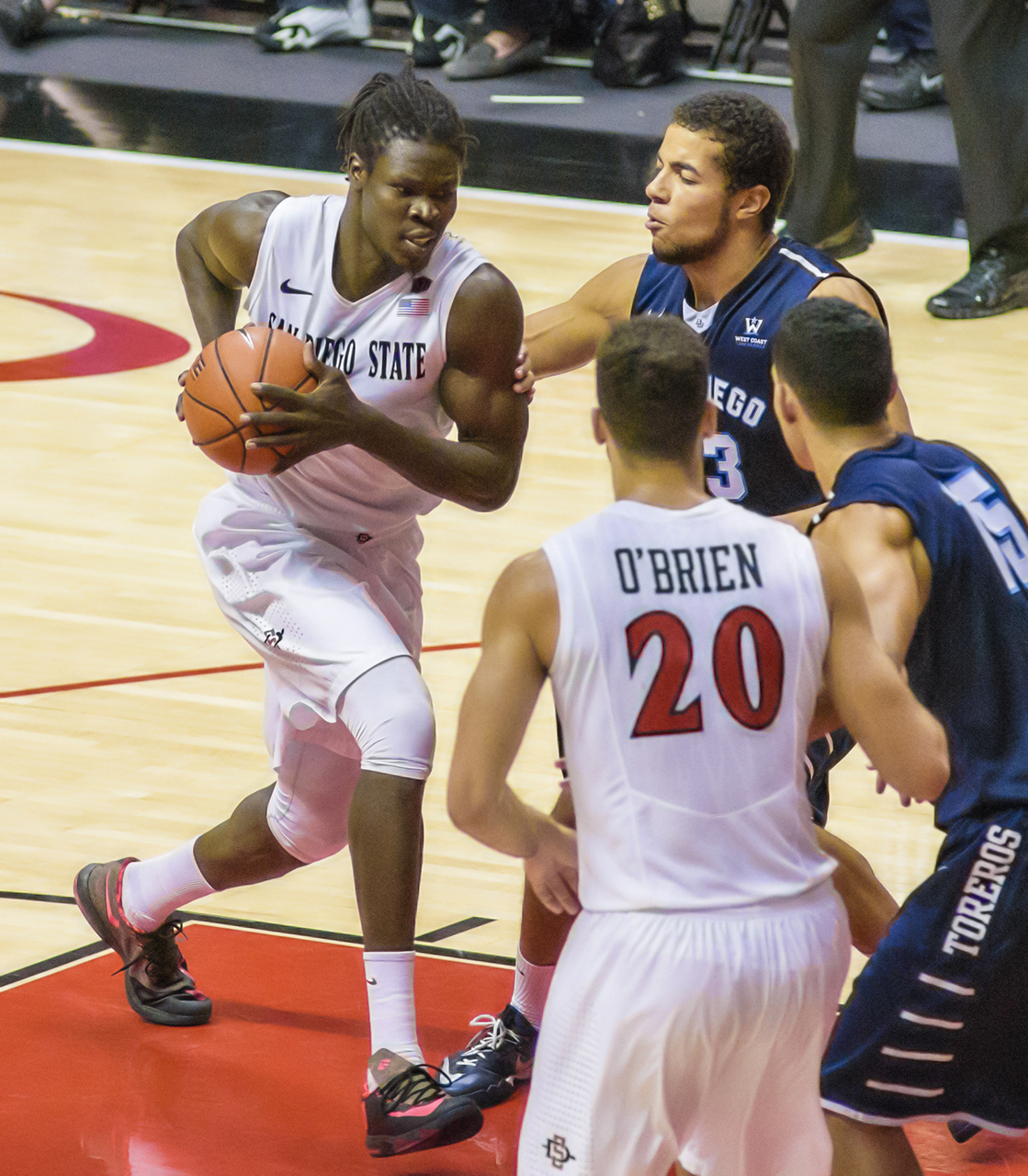
- Chol (left) in 2014

No. 7 – Tokyo United
- Position: Power forward
- League: B.League

Personal information
- Born: July 15, 1993 (age 33) Khartoum, Sudan
- Listed height: 6 ft 9 in (2.06 m)
- Listed weight: 225 lb (102 kg)

Career information
- High school: Hoover (San Diego, California)
- College: Arizona (2011–2013); San Diego State (2014–2016)
- NBA draft: 2016: undrafted
- Playing career: 2016–present

Career history
- 2016–2017: Illiabum Clube
- 2017–2018: Sendai 89ers
- 2018–2019: Cáceres Ciudad del Baloncesto
- 2019–2020: Aomori Wat's
- 2021: Phoenix Brussels
- 2021–2022: Chun Yu
- 2022–2023: Tokyo United
- 2023: Toyama Grouses
- 2024: Akita Northern Happinets
- 2024–present: Tokyo United

Career highlights
- Second-team Parade All-American (2011)

Angelo Ajieng Chol (born July 15, 1993) is a South Sudanese professional basketball player for Tokyo United of the B.League. He played college basketball for the Arizona Wildcats and the San Diego State Aztecs.

== Early life ==
Chol was born in Sudan to a Christian family from the Dinka tribe, growing up speaking both Dinka and Arabic at home. His mother died when he was three years old and his father was jailed and tortured due to religious persecution. Chol and his father eventually escaped via train and boat. They stayed in Cairo for a year while they were processed as refugees before eventually arriving in San Diego, California, settling in the culturally diverse neighborhood of City Heights. Chol, six years old at the time, began the second grade with no English skills. "Food was different," he said. "Life was different." Chol initially did not play any sports. However, he was encouraged to try basketball in middle school by coaches due to his size.

Chol attended Hoover High School in San Diego, where he led the basketball team to four straight CIF San Diego Section (CIF–SDS) finals. As a sophomore, he set the national record with 337 blocks in a single season. As a senior, Chol averaged 23.2 points and 14.9 rebounds per game and was named the CIF–SDS Player of the Year by The San Diego Union-Tribune.

== Professional career ==
On January 21, 2021, Chol signed with Phoenix Brussels of the Belgian Pro Basketball League (PBL).

On June 28, 2024, Chol signed with Tokyo United of the B.League.

== Career statistics ==
=== B.League ===
Legend
| GP | Games played | GS | Games started | MPG | Minutes per game |
| FG% | Field goal percentage | 3P% | 3-point field goal percentage | FT% | Free throw percentage |
| RPG | Rebounds per game | APG | Assists per game | SPG | Steals per game |
| BPG | Blocks per game | PPG | Points per game | **Bold** | Career high |

| Year | Team | GP | GS | MPG | FG% | 3P% | FT% | RPG | APG | SPG | BPG | PPG |
|---|---|---|---|---|---|---|---|---|---|---|---|---|
| 2017–18 | Sendai | 53 | 15 | 18.8 | .535 | .000 | .585 | 6.7 | 1.0 | 0.4 | 0.9 | 10.3 |
