= 2011–12 NCAA Division I men's basketball rankings =

- Season: 2011–12
- NCAA Tournament: 2012
- Preseason No. 1: North Carolina
- NCAA Tournament Champions: Kentucky
NCAA Division I men's basketball rankings


Two human polls make up the 2011–12 NCAA Division I men's basketball rankings, the AP Poll and the Coaches Poll, in addition to various publications' preseason polls.

== Legend ==
	Increase in ranking
	Decrease in ranking
	Not ranked previous week
Italics	Number of first place votes
(#-#)	Win–loss record
т	Tied with team above or below also with this symbol

== AP poll ==
The Associated Press (AP) preseason poll was released on October 28, 2011. This poll is compiled by sportswriters across the nation. In Division I men's and women's college basketball, the AP Poll is largely just a tool to compare schools throughout the season and spark debate, as it has no bearing on postseason play. Generally, all top 25 teams in the poll at the end of the regular season are invited to the NCAA basketball tournament, also known as March Madness.

	Preseason Oct 28	Week 1 Nov 14	Week 2 Nov 21	Week 3 Nov 28	Week 4 Dec 5	Week 5 Dec 12	Week 6 Dec 19	Week 7 Dec 26	Week 8 Jan 2	Week 9 Jan 9	Week 10 Jan 16	Week 11 Jan 23	Week 12 Jan 30	Week 13 Feb 6	Week 14 Feb 13	Week 15 Feb 20	Week 16 Feb 27	Week 17 Mar 5	Week 18 Mar 12	
1.	North Carolina 62	North Carolina (2–0) 62	North Carolina (3–0) 62	Kentucky (6–0) 46	Kentucky (8–0) 47	Syracuse (10–0) 51	Syracuse (11–0) 53	Syracuse (13–0) 54	Syracuse (15–0) 60	Syracuse (17–0) 60	Syracuse (19–0) 60	Kentucky (19–1) 61	Kentucky (21–1) 63	Kentucky (23–1) 63	Kentucky (25–1) 63	Kentucky (26–1) 63	Kentucky (28–1) 63	Kentucky (30–1) 63	Kentucky (32–2) 61	1.
2.	Kentucky	Kentucky (1–0)	Kentucky (4–0)	Ohio State (6–0) 17	Ohio State (8–0) 18	Ohio State (8–1) 7	Ohio State (10–1) 5	Ohio State (12–1) 5	Kentucky (13–1) 5	Kentucky (15–1) 5	Kentucky (17–1) 4	Missouri (18–1) 2	Syracuse (22–1) 2	Syracuse (23–1) 2	Syracuse (25–1) 2	Syracuse (27–1) 2	Syracuse (29–1) 2	Syracuse (30–1) 2	Syracuse (31–2) 1	2.
3.	Ohio State 1	Ohio State (1–0) 1	Ohio State (3–0) 1	Duke (7–0) 2	Syracuse (8–0)	Kentucky (8–1) 4	Kentucky (9–1) 4	Kentucky (11–1) 4	North Carolina (13–2)	North Carolina (14–2)	Baylor (17–0) 1	Syracuse (20–1) 2	Ohio State (19–3)	Ohio State (20–3)	Missouri (23–2)	Missouri (25–2)	Kansas (24–5)	Kansas (26–5)	Missouri (30–4) 2	3.
4.	Connecticut 2	Connecticut (1–0) 2	Connecticut (4–0) 2	Syracuse (6–0)	North Carolina (6–2)	Louisville (9–0) 2	Louisville (10–0) 2	Louisville (12–0) 2	Baylor (13–0)	Baylor (15–0)	Duke (15–2)	Ohio State (17–3)	Missouri (19–2)	Missouri (21–2)	Kansas (20–5)	Kansas (22–5)	Duke (25–4)	North Carolina (27–4)	North Carolina (29–5) 1	4.
5.	Syracuse	Syracuse (1–0)	Syracuse (4–0)	North Carolina (5–1)	Louisville (7–0)	North Carolina (8–2) 1	North Carolina (9–2)	North Carolina (11–2)	Duke (12–1)	Ohio State (15–2)	Missouri (16–1)	Kansas (16–3)	North Carolina (18–3)	North Carolina (20–3)	Duke (21–4)	Duke (23–4)	Michigan State (24–5)	Missouri (27–4)	Michigan State (27–7)	5.
6.	Duke	Duke (2–0)	Duke (4–0)	Louisville (5–0)	Baylor (7–0)	Baylor (7–0)	Baylor (9–0)	Baylor (12–0)	Ohio State (13–2)	Michigan State (14–2)	Ohio State (16–3)	Baylor (17–2)	Baylor (19–2)	Baylor (21–2)	Ohio State (21–4)	Michigan State (22–5)	North Carolina (25–4)	Duke (26–5)	Kansas (27–6)	6.
7.	Vanderbilt	Florida (1–0)	Louisville (3–0)	Baylor (5–0)	Duke (7–1)	Duke (9–1)	Duke (9–1)	Duke (10–1)	Missouri (13–0)	Indiana (15–1)	Kansas (14–3)	North Carolina (16–3)	Duke (18–3)	Kansas (18–5)	Michigan State (20–5)	North Carolina (23–4)	Missouri (25–4)	Ohio State (25–6)	Ohio State (27–7)	7.
8.	Florida	Louisville (2–0)	Memphis (1–0)	Connecticut (6–1)	Xavier (6–0)	Xavier (8–0)	Connecticut (9–1)	Missouri (12–0)	Connecticut (12–1)	Duke (13–2)	North Carolina (15–3)	Duke (16–3)	Kansas (17–4)	Florida (19–4)	North Carolina (21–4)	Ohio State (22–5)	Marquette (24–5)	Michigan State (24–7)	Duke (27–6)	8.
9.	Louisville	Pittsburgh (2–0)	Baylor (3–0)	Wisconsin (6–0)	Connecticut (7–1)	Connecticut (8–1)	Missouri (11–0)	Connecticut (10–1)	Georgetown (12–1)	Missouri (14–1)	Michigan State (15–3)	Georgetown (16–3)	Michigan State (17–4)	Murray State (23–0)	Baylor (21–4)	Georgetown (20–5)	Baylor (24–5)	Marquette (25–6)	Baylor (27–7)	9.
10.	Pittsburgh	Memphis (0–0)	Florida (2–1)	Florida (4–1)	Missouri (7–0)	Missouri (9–0)	Marquette (10–0)	Florida (10–2)	Michigan State (13–2)	Kansas (12–3)	Georgetown (14–3)	Michigan State (16–4)	Murray State (21–0)	Duke (19–4)	Georgetown (19–5)	Marquette (22–5)	Ohio State (23–6)	Michigan (23–8)	Florida State (24–9)	10.
11.	Memphis	Baylor (2–0)	Wisconsin (3–0)	Xavier (4–0)	Marquette (7–0)	Marquette (9–0)	Florida (8–2)	Wisconsin (11–2)	Louisville (12–2)	Georgetown (13–2)	Indiana (15–3)	Murray State (20–0)	UNLV (20–3)	Michigan State (18–5)	UNLV (22–4)	Michigan (20–7)	Georgetown (21–6)	Murray State (30–1)	Marquette (25–7)	11.
12.	Baylor	Kansas (1–0)	Xavier (3–0)	Alabama (7–0)	Florida (5–2)	Kansas (7–2)	Kansas (7–2)	Georgetown (10–1)	Indiana (13–1)	UNLV (16–2)	Murray State (18–0)	UNLV (18–3)	Florida (17–4)	Georgetown (18–4)	Marquette (21–5)	Florida (21–6)	Murray State (28–1)	Baylor (25–6)	Murray State (30–1)	12.
13.	Kansas	Xavier (1–0)	Alabama (5–0)	Missouri (6–0)	Kansas (5–2)	Florida (7–2)	Wisconsin (10–2)	Indiana (12–0)	Florida (11–3)	Michigan (13–3)	Connecticut (14–3)	San Diego State (17–2)	Creighton (20–2)	San Diego State (20–3)	San Diego State (20–4)	Baylor (22–5)	Michigan (21–8)	Georgetown (22–7)	Michigan (24–9)	13.
14.	Xavier	Wisconsin (1–0)	Kansas (1–1)	Michigan (5–1)	Wisconsin (6–2)	Wisconsin (8–2)	Xavier (8–1)	Marquette (11–1)	Kansas (10–3)	Louisville (13–3)	UNLV (16–3)	Florida (15–4)	Georgetown (16–4)	UNLV (21–4)	Florida (19–6)	Murray State (26–1)	Wisconsin (21–8)	Wisconsin (23–8)	Wisconsin (24–9)	14.
15.	Wisconsin	Arizona (3–0)	Michigan (3–0)	Kansas (3–2)	Pittsburgh (7–1)	Pittsburgh (9–1)	Pittsburgh (10–1)	Mississippi State (12–1)	Mississippi State (13–2)	Murray State (16–0)	Virginia (14–2)	Creighton (18–2)	Marquette (18–4)	Florida State (16–6)	Wisconsin (19–6)	Florida State (19–7)	Wichita State (26–4)	Indiana (24–7)	Georgetown (23–8)	15.
16.	Arizona	Alabama (1–0)	Marquette (4–0)	Marquette (5–0)	Alabama (7–1)	Georgetown (8–1)	Georgetown (9–1)	Michigan State (11–2)	Michigan (12–2)	Virginia (14–1)	San Diego State (16–2)	Indiana (16–4)	Virginia (17–3)	Saint Mary's (22–2)	Murray State (24–1)	Wisconsin (20–7)	Florida (22–7)	Wichita State (27–5)	Indiana (25–8)	16.
17.	UCLA	Michigan (1–0)	Pittsburgh (2–1)	Pittsburgh (5–1)	Mississippi State (8–1)	Mississippi State (9–1)	Indiana (10–0)	Kansas (8–3)	UNLV (15–2)	Connecticut (12–3)	Florida (14–4)	Marquette (16–4)	San Diego State (18–3)	Creighton (21–3)	Michigan (19–7)	Louisville (21–6)	UNLV (24–6)	Florida State (21–9)	Louisville (26–9)	17.
18.	Michigan	Vanderbilt (1–1)	Vanderbilt (3–1)	UNLV (7–0)	Georgetown (7–1)	Indiana (9–0)	Mississippi State (11–1)	Michigan (10–2)	Wisconsin (12–3)	Kansas State (12–2)	Mississippi State (15–3)	Mississippi State (16–4)	Saint Mary's (21–2)	Marquette (19–5)	Indiana (19–6)	New Mexico (22–4)	Indiana (22–7)	San Diego State (24–6)	Wichita State (27–5)	18.
19.	Alabama	Texas A&M (2–0)	Gonzaga (3–0)	Gonzaga (4–0)	Creighton (7–0)	Illinois (10–0)	Michigan State (9–2)	UNLV (13–2)	Murray State (14–0)	Florida (12–4)	Creighton (16–2)	Virginia (15–3)	Wisconsin (17–5)	Virginia (18–4)	Louisville (20–5)	Wichita State (24–4)	Louisville (22–7)	Creighton (28–5)	Creighton (28–5)	19.
20.	Texas A&M	Cincinnati (1–0)	California (3–0)	Vanderbilt (5–1)	Michigan (6–2)	Michigan (7–2)	Michigan (9–2)	Murray State (13–0)	Marquette (12–2)	Mississippi State (13–3)	Michigan (14–4)	Michigan (15–5)	Indiana (17–5)	Mississippi State (18–5)	Florida State (17–7)	Notre Dame (19–8)	Notre Dame (20–9)	UNLV (25–7)	Vanderbilt (24–10)	20.
21.	Cincinnati	Marquette (1–0)	Missouri (3–0)	Mississippi State (7–1)	Memphis (4–2)	Michigan State (8–2)	UNLV (11–2)	Creighton (10–1)	Virginia (12–1)	Gonzaga (13–2)	Marquette (14–4)	Saint Mary's (19–2)	Florida State (14–6)	Wisconsin (18–6)	Saint Mary's (23–3)	UNLV (22–6)	San Diego State (22–6)	Temple (24–6)	New Mexico (27–6)	21.
22.	Marquette	Gonzaga (1–0)	Florida State (4–0)	Memphis (2–2)	Texas A&M (6–1)	Texas A&M (8–1)	Murray State (12–0)	Pittsburgh (11–2)	Harvard (12–1)	San Diego State (13–2)	Illinois (15–3)	Kansas State (14–4)	Mississippi State (17–5)	Michigan (17–7)	Virginia (19–5)	Temple (21–5)	Florida State (19–9)	Florida (22–9)	San Diego State (26–7)	22.
23.	Gonzaga	California (2–0)	Arizona (4–1)	Saint Louis (6–0)	Gonzaga (5–1)	Alabama (8–2)	Creighton (8–1)	Virginia (10–1)	Kansas State (11–1)	Creighton (13–2)	Louisville (14–4)	Florida State (13–6)	Michigan (16–6)	Indiana (18–6)	Notre Dame (17–8)	Indiana (20–7)	Temple (22–6)	Notre Dame (21–10)	UNLV (26–8)	23.
24.	California	Missouri (1–0)	Mississippi State (4–1)	California (5–1)	Illinois (8–0)	Murray State (10–0)	Virginia (9–1)	Harvard (10–1)	San Diego State (12–2)	Seton Hall (14–2)	Saint Mary's (17–2)	Connecticut (14–5)	Gonzaga (17–3)	Louisville (18–5)	Gonzaga (20–4) т	San Diego State (20–6)	Virginia (21–7)	Gonzaga (25–5)	Saint Mary's (27–5)	24.
25.	Missouri	Florida State (1–0)	Texas A&M (3–1)	Texas A&M (4–1)	Harvard (8–0)	Creighton (7–1) т; Vanderbilt (6–3) т	Illinois (10–1)	San Diego State (11–2)	Gonzaga (11–2)	Marquette (12–4)	Kansas State (12–4)	Wisconsin (16–5)	Vanderbilt (16–5)	Harvard (20–2)	Wichita State (22–4) т	Virginia (20–6)	Creighton (25–5)	Iowa State (22–9)	Florida (23–10)	25.
	Preseason Oct 28	Week 1 Nov 14	Week 2 Nov 21	Week 3 Nov 28	Week 4 Dec 5	Week 5 Dec 12	Week 6 Dec 19	Week 7 Dec 26	Week 8 Jan 2	Week 9 Jan 9	Week 10 Jan 16	Week 11 Jan 23	Week 12 Jan 30	Week 13 Feb 6	Week 14 Feb 13	Week 15 Feb 20	Week 16 Feb 27	Week 17 Mar 5	Week 18 Mar 12	
		Dropped: UCLA (0–1)	Dropped: Cincinnati (2–1)	Dropped: Florida State (5–2); Arizona (4–2)	Dropped: UNLV (8–1); Vanderbilt (5–3); Saint Louis (7–1); California (6–2)	Dropped: Memphis (5–3); Gonzaga (5–2); Harvard (9–1)	Dropped: Texas A&M (8–2); Alabama (8–3); Vanderbilt (6–4)	Dropped: Xavier (9–3); Illinois (11–2)	Dropped: Creighton (11–2); Pittsburgh (11–4)	Dropped: Wisconsin (12–5); Harvard (13–2)	Dropped: Gonzaga (14–3); Seton Hall (15–3)	Dropped: Illinois (15–5); Louisville (15–5)	Dropped: Connecticut (14–6); Kansas State (15–5)	Dropped: Gonzaga (18–4); Vanderbilt (16–7)	Dropped: Creighton (21–5); Mississippi State (19–6); Harvard; (21–3)	Dropped: Saint Mary's (23–5); Gonzaga (21–5)	Dropped: New Mexico (22–6)	Dropped: Louisville (22–9); Virginia (22–8)	Dropped: Temple (24–7); Notre Dame (22–11); Gonzaga (25–6); Iowa State (22–10)	

== ESPN/USA Today Coaches Poll ==
The Coaches Poll is the second oldest poll still in use after the AP Poll. It is compiled by a rotating group of 31 college Division I head coaches. The Poll operates by Borda count. Each voting member ranks teams from 1 to 25. Each team then receives points for their ranking in reverse order: Number 1 earns 25 points, number 2 earns 24 points, and so forth. The points are then combined and the team with the highest points is then ranked #1; second highest is ranked #2 and so forth. Only the top 25 teams with points are ranked, with teams receiving first place votes noted the quantity next to their name. Any team receiving votes after the top 25 are listed after the top 25 by their point totals. However, these are not real rankings: They are not considered #26, #27, etc. The maximum points a single team can earn is 775. The preseason poll was released on October 20, 2011.

	Preseason Oct 20	Week 1 Nov 14	Week 2 Nov 21	Week 3 Nov 28	Week 4 Dec 5	Week 5 Dec 12	Week 6 Dec 19	Week 7 Dec 26	Week 8 Jan 2	Week 9 Jan 9	Week 10 Jan 16	Week 11 Jan 23	Week 12 Jan 30	Week 13 Feb 6	Week 14 Feb 13	Week 15 Feb 20	Week 16 Feb 27	Week 17 Mar 5	Week 18 Mar 11	Week 19 Apr 3	
1.	North Carolina 30	North Carolina (2–0) 30	North Carolina (3–0) 30	Kentucky (6–0) 22	Kentucky (8–0) 19	Syracuse (10–0) 28	Syracuse (11–0) 30	Syracuse (13–0) 30	Syracuse (15–0) 30	Syracuse (17–0) 30	Syracuse (19–0) 31	Kentucky (19–1) 31	Kentucky (21–1) 31	Kentucky (23–1) 31	Kentucky (25–1) 31	Kentucky (26–1) 31	Kentucky (28–1) 31	Kentucky (30–1) 31	Kentucky (32–2) 30	Kentucky (38–2) 31	1.
2.	Kentucky 1	Kentucky (1–0) 1	Kentucky (4–0) 1	Ohio State (6–0) 8	Ohio State (8–0) 11	Ohio State (8–1) 2	Ohio State (10–1) 1	Ohio State (12–1) 1	Kentucky (13–1) 1	Kentucky (15–1) 1	Kentucky (17–1)	Missouri (18–1)	Syracuse (22–1)	Syracuse (23–1)	Syracuse (25–1)	Syracuse (27–1)	Syracuse (29–1)	Syracuse (30–1)	Syracuse (31–2)	Kansas (32–7)	2.
3.	Ohio State	Ohio State (1–0)	Ohio State (3–0)	Syracuse (6–0) 1	Syracuse (8–0) 1	Kentucky (8–1)	Kentucky (9–1)	Kentucky (11–1)	Duke (12–1)	North Carolina (14–2)	Baylor (17–0)	Ohio State (17–3)	Ohio State (19–3)	Ohio State (20–3)	Missouri (23–2)	Missouri (25–2)	Duke (25–4)	Kansas (26–5)	Missouri (30–4) 1	Ohio State (31–8)	3.
4.	Connecticut	Connecticut (1–0)	Connecticut (4–0)	Duke (7–0)	Louisville (7–0)	Louisville (9–0)	Louisville (10–0)	Louisville (12–0)	North Carolina (13–2)	Baylor (15–0)	Duke (15–2)	Syracuse (20–1)	Missouri (19–2)	Missouri (21–2)	Duke (21–4)	Duke (23–4)	Kansas (24–5)	North Carolina (27–4)	Michigan State (27–7)	Louisville (30–10)	4.
5.	Syracuse	Syracuse (1–0)	Syracuse (4–0)	North Carolina (5–1)	Duke (7–1)	Duke (9–1)	Duke (9–1)	Duke (10–1)	Baylor (13–0)	Ohio State (15–2)	Missouri (16–1)	Kansas (16–3)	Duke (18–3)	North Carolina (20–3)	Kansas (20–5)	Kansas (22–5)	Michigan State (24–5)	Missouri (27–4)	North Carolina (29–5)	Syracuse (34–3)	5.
6.	Duke	Duke (2–0)	Duke (4–0)	Louisville (5–0)	North Carolina (6–2)	North Carolina (8–2)	North Carolina (9–2)	North Carolina (11–2)	Missouri (13–0)	Duke (13–2)	Ohio State (16–3)	Duke (16–3)	Baylor (19–2) т	Baylor (21–2)	Ohio State (21–4)	Michigan State (22–5)	North Carolina (25–4)	Duke (26–5)	Kansas (27–6)	North Carolina (32–6)	6.
7.	Vanderbilt	Louisville (2–0)	Louisville (3–0)	Wisconsin (6–0)	Baylor (7–0)	Baylor (7–0)	Baylor (9–0)	Baylor (12–0)	Ohio State (13–2)	Michigan State (14–2)	Kansas (14–3)	Baylor (17–2)	North Carolina (18–3) т	Florida (19–4) т	North Carolina (21–4)	North Carolina (23–4)	Marquette (24–5)	Ohio State (25–6)	Ohio State (27–7)	Michigan State (29–8)	7.
8.	Louisville	Florida (1–0)	Memphis (1–0)	Baylor (5–0)	Xavier (6–0)	Missouri (9–0)	Missouri (11–0)	Missouri (12–0)	Connecticut (12–1)	Indiana (15–1)	North Carolina (15–3)	North Carolina (16–3)	Kansas (17–4)	Murray State (23–0) т	Michigan State (20–5)	Georgetown (20–5)	Missouri (25–4)	Michigan State (24–7)	Duke (27–6)	Baylor (30–8)	8.
9.	Memphis	Pittsburgh (2–0)	Florida (2–1)	Florida (4–1)	Connecticut (7–1)	Xavier (8–0)	Connecticut (9–1)	Connecticut (10–1)	Georgetown (12–1)	Missouri (14–1)	Michigan State (15–3)	Murray State (20–0)	Murray State (21–0)	Duke (19–4)	Georgetown (19–5)	Ohio State (22–5)	Murray State (28–1)	Marquette (25–6)	Murray State (30–1)	Florida (26–11)	9.
10.	Florida	Memphis (0–0)	Baylor (3–0)	Connecticut (6–1)	Missouri (7–0)	Connecticut (8–1)	Marquette (10–0)	Florida (10–2)	Louisville (12–2)	Kansas (12–3)	Murray State (18–0)	Georgetown (16–3)	Michigan State (17–4)	Kansas (18–5)	Baylor (21–4)	Marquette (22–5)	Baylor (24–5)	Murray State (30–1)	Baylor (27–7)	Marquette (27–8)	10.
11.	Pittsburgh	Kansas (1–0)	Wisconsin (3–0)	Xavier (4–0)	Marquette (7–0)	Marquette (9–0)	Kansas (7–2)	Wisconsin (11–2)	Michigan State (13–2)	Georgetown (13–2)	Connecticut (14–3)	Michigan State (16–4)	Florida (17–4)	Georgetown (18–4)	UNLV (22–4)	Florida (21–6)	Ohio State (23–6)	Baylor (25–6)	Marquette (25–7)	Missouri (30–5)	11.
12.	Baylor	Baylor (2–0)	Xavier (3–0)	Alabama (7–0)	Florida (5–2)	Kansas (7–2)	Florida (8–2)	Georgetown (10–1)	Indiana (13–1)	UNLV (16–2)	Georgetown (14–3)	San Diego State (17–2)	Creighton (20–2)	Michigan State (18–5)	Florida (19–6)	Murray State (26–1)	Georgetown (21–6)	Wisconsin (23–8)	Florida State (24–9)	Wisconsin (26–10)	12.
13.	Kansas	Wisconsin (1–0)	Alabama (5–0)	Missouri (6–0)	Kansas (5–2)	Florida (7–2)	Pittsburgh (10–1)	Marquette (11–1)	Michigan (12–2)	Michigan (13–3)	Indiana (15–3)	Florida (15–4)	UNLV (20–3)	Saint Mary's (22–2)	Marquette (21–5)	Michigan (20–7)	Florida (22–7)	Michigan (23–8)	Wisconsin (24–9)	Indiana (27–9)	13.
14.	Wisconsin	Xavier (1–0)	Kansas (1–1)	Kansas (3–2)	Pittsburgh (7–1)	Pittsburgh (9–1)	Wisconsin (10–2)	Mississippi State (12–1)	Florida (11–3)	Murray State (16–0)	Florida (14–4)	Creighton (18–2)	Georgetown (16–4)	San Diego State (20–3)	Murray State (24–1)	Baylor (22–5)	Wichita State (26–4)	Georgetown (22–7)	Michigan (24–9)	Duke (27–7)	14.
15.	Xavier	Alabama (1–0)	Michigan (3–0)	Michigan (5–1)	Alabama (7–1)	Wisconsin (8–2)	Xavier (8–1)	Indiana (12–0)	Kansas (10–3)	Louisville (13–3)	Mississippi State (15–3)	UNLV (18–3)	Marquette (18–4)	Creighton (21–3)	San Diego State (20–4)	Wisconsin (20–7)	Wisconsin (21–8)	Indiana (24–7)	Georgetown (23–8)	Florida State (25–10)	15.
16.	Arizona	Arizona (3–0)	Pittsburgh (2–1)	Marquette (5–0)	Wisconsin (6–2)	Mississippi State (9–1)	Georgetown (9–1)	Michigan (10–2)	Mississippi State (13–2)	Connecticut (12–3)	San Diego State (16–2)	Mississippi State (16–4)	Saint Mary's (21–2)	UNLV (21–4)	Saint Mary's (23–3)	Florida State (19–7)	Michigan (21–8)	Wichita State (27–5)	Saint Mary's (27–5)	Murray State (31–2)	16.
17.	Alabama	Michigan (1–0)	Marquette (4–0)	Pittsburgh (5–1)	Creighton (7–0)	Georgetown (8–1)	Mississippi State (11–1)	Michigan State (11–2)	UNLV (15–2)	Virginia (14–1)	Virginia (14–2)	Indiana (16–4)	San Diego State (18–3)	Florida State (16–6)	Wisconsin (19–6)	Louisville (21–6)	UNLV (24–6)	Florida State (21–9)	Indiana (25–8)	Georgetown (24–9)	17.
18.	Michigan	Texas A&M (2–0)	California (3–0)	Gonzaga (4–0)	Mississippi State (8–1)	Michigan (7–2)	Indiana (10–0)	Kansas (8–3)	Murray State (14–0)	Kansas State (12–2)	Creighton (16–2)	Marquette (16–4)	Virginia (17–3)	Mississippi State (18–5)	Louisville (20–5)	Notre Dame (19–8)	Louisville (22–7)	St. Mary's (26–5)	Louisville (26–9)	Cincinnati (26–11)	18.
19.	Texas A&M	Marquette (1–0)	Gonzaga (3–0)	Vanderbilt (5–1)	Michigan (6–2)	Illinois (10–0)	Michigan (9–2)	Creighton (10–1)	Wisconsin (12–3)	Florida (12–4)	Michigan (14–4)	Connecticut (14–5)	Mississippi State (17–5)	Marquette (19–5)	Michigan (19–7)	Wichita State (24–4)	Notre Dame (20–9)	Florida (22–9)	Wichita State (27–5)	Vanderbilt (25–11)	19.
20.	UCLA	Vanderbilt (1–1) т	Florida State (4–0)	UNLV (7–0)	Memphis (4–2)	Indiana (9–0)	Michigan State (9–2)	UNLV (13–2)	Marquette (12–2)	Mississippi State (13–3)	UNLV (16–3)	Saint Mary's (19–2)	Indiana (17–5) т	Virginia (18–4)	Indiana (19–6)	UNLV (22–6)	Indiana (22–7)	UNLV (25–7)	Creighton (28–5)	North Carolina State (24–13)	20.
21.	Marquette	Cincinnati (1–0) т	Missouri (3–0)	Memphis (2–2)	Georgetown (7–1)	Alabama (8–2)	Creighton (8–1)	Murray State (13–0)	Harvard (12–1)	Creighton (13–2)	Louisville (14–4)	Virginia (15–3)	Wisconsin (17–5) т	Harvard (20–2)	Florida State (17–7)	New Mexico (22–4)	Saint Mary's (25–5)	San Diego State (24–6)	Florida (23–10)	Creighton (29–6)	21.
22.	Cincinnati	California (2–0)	Vanderbilt (3–1)	Creighton (5–1)	Illinois (8–0) т	Texas A&M (8–1)	Murray State (12–0)	Pittsburgh (11–2)	Kansas State (11–1)	San Diego State (13–2)	Marquette (14–4)	Michigan (15–5)	Michigan (16–6)	Wisconsin (18–6)	Virginia (19–5)	Temple (21–5)	Florida State (19–9)	Creighton (28–5)	New Mexico (27–6)	Michigan (24–10)	22.
23.	Gonzaga	Gonzaga (1–0)	Arizona (4–1)	California (5–1)	Gonzaga (5–1) т	Michigan State (8–2)	UNLV (11–2)	Harvard (10–1)	Virginia (12–1)	Gonzaga (13–2)	Saint Mary's (17–2)	Harvard (16–2)	Harvard (18–2)	Indiana (18–6) т	Mississippi State (19–6)	Saint Mary's (23–5)	San Diego State (22–6)	Notre Dame (21–10)	San Diego State (26–7)	New Mexico (28–7)	23.
24.	California	Florida State (1–0)	Texas A&M (3–1)	Mississippi State (7–1)	Harvard (8–0)	Creighton (7–1)	Illinois (10–1)	Virginia (10–1)	Creighton (11–2)	Marquette (12–4)	Harvard (15–2)	Kansas State (14–4)	Florida State (14–6)	Louisville (18–5) т	Gonzaga (20–4)	Indiana (20–7)	Creighton (25–5)	Temple (24–6)	Vanderbilt (24–10)	Xavier (23–13)	24.
25.	Missouri	Missouri (1–0)	Creighton (4–0)	Saint Louis (6–0)	Texas A&M (6–1)	Vanderbilt (6–3)	Harvard (9–1)	Kansas State (10–1)	San Diego State (12–2)	Harvard (13–2)	Illinois (15–3)	Wisconsin (16–5) т; Louisville (15–5) т	Louisville (17–5)	Michigan (17–7)	Notre Dame (17–-8)	San Diego State (20–6)	Temple (22–6)	Gonzaga (25–5)	UNLV (26–8)	Ohio (29–8)	25.
	Preseason Oct 20	Week 1 Nov 14	Week 2 Nov 21	Week 3 Nov 28	Week 4 Dec 5	Week 5 Dec 12	Week 6 Dec 19	Week 7 Dec 26	Week 8 Jan 2	Week 9 Jan 9	Week 10 Jan 16	Week 11 Jan 23	Week 12 Jan 30	Week 13 Feb 6	Week 14 Feb 13	Week 15 Feb 20	Week 16 Feb 27	Week 17 Mar 5	Week 18 Mar 11	Week 19 Apr 3	
		Dropped: UCLA (0–1)	Dropped: Cincinnati (2–1)	Dropped: Florida State (5–2); Arizona (4–2); Texas A&M (4–1)	Dropped: Vanderbilt (5–3); UNLV (8–1); California (6–2); Saint Louis (7–1)	Dropped: Memphis (5–3); Gonzaga (5–2); Harvard (9–1)	Dropped: Alabama (8–3); Texas A&M (8–2); Vanderbilt (6–4)	Dropped: Xavier (9–3); Illinois (11–2)	Dropped: Pittsburgh (11–4)	Dropped: Wisconsin (12–5)	Dropped: Kansas State (12–4); Gonzaga (14–3)	Dropped: Illinois (15–5)	Dropped: Connecticut (14–6); Kansas State (15–5)	None	Dropped: Creighton (21–5); Harvard (21–3)	Dropped: Virginia (20–6); Mississippi State (19–8); Gonzaga (21–5)	Dropped: New Mexico (22–6)	Dropped: Louisville (22–9)	Dropped: Temple (24–7); Notre Dame (22–11); Gonzaga (25–6)	Dropped: Saint Mary's (27–6); Wichita State (27–6); San Diego State (26–8); UNLV (26–9)	

== Preseason polls ==
Various publications and news sources release their preseason top 25 months before the season commences.

	Athlon	Lindy's	Sporting News	Fox Sports	CBS Sports	Rivals.com	Blue Ribbon
1.	North Carolina	Ohio State	North Carolina	North Carolina	North Carolina	North Carolina	North Carolina
2.	Kentucky	North Carolina	Kentucky	Kentucky	Kentucky	Kentucky	Kentucky
3.	Ohio State	Kentucky	Ohio State	Ohio State	Connecticut	Connecticut	Ohio State
4.	Connecticut	Vanderbilt	Connecticut	Connecticut	Syracuse	Ohio State	Syracuse
5.	Syracuse	Duke	Duke	Syracuse	Ohio State	Duke	Connecticut
6.	Duke	Pittsburgh	Syracuse	Duke	Duke	Syracuse	Duke
7.	Vanderbilt	Michigan	Florida	Vanderbilt	Vanderbilt	Florida	Vanderbilt
8.	Louisville	Connecticut	Memphis	Florida	Louisville	Vanderbilt	Pittsburgh
9.	Florida	Syracuse	Baylor	Louisville	Memphis	Pittsburgh	Florida
10.	Pittsburgh	Florida	Vanderbilt	Pittsburgh	Pittsburgh	Baylor	Arizona
11.	Baylor	California	Pittsburgh	Memphis	Florida	Memphis	Kansas
12.	Memphis	Louisville	Arizona	Baylor	Baylor	Kansas	Memphis
13.	Kansas	Memphis	Wisconsin	Kansas	Xavier	Wisconsin	Louisville
14.	Wisconsin	Gonzaga	Kansas	Xavier	Kansas	Marquette	Xavier
15.	Xavier	Washington	UCLA	Wisconsin	Arizona	Arizona	Wisconsin
16.	Alabama	Michigan State	Louisville	Arizona	Cincinnati	Louisville	Texas A&M
17.	Marquette	Baylor	Cincinnati	UCLA	Texas A&M	Xavier	Florida State
18.	Cincinnati	Xavier	Xavier	Michigan	Gonzaga	Gonzaga	Alabama
19.	Michigan State	New Mexico	Michigan	Alabama	Florida State	Alabama	Baylor
20.	UCLA	UCLA	Gonzaga	Texas A&M	Michigan	Michigan	Michigan State
21.	California	Missouri	Marquette	Cincinnati	UCLA	Texas A&M	California
22.	Florida State	Arizona	California	Marquette	Alabama	California	Marquette
23.	Texas A&M	Creighton	Alabama	Gonzaga	Missouri	Cincinnati	UCLA
24.	Missouri	Butler	Washington	California	Wisconsin	Florida State	Missouri
25.	Arizona	Alabama	Michigan State	Missouri	Villanova	Temple	Michigan
