= 2011–12 West Coast Conference men's basketball season =

2011–12 West Coast Conference Men's Basketball Season
- League: NCAA Division I
- Sport: Basketball
- Teams: 9
- TV partner(s): (national) ESPN2, ESPNU, BYUtv, (regional) 4SD, CSNNW, CSNBA, CSNCA, ROOT, FS West, Prime Ticket

Regular Season
- Season champions: Saint Mary's
- Runners-up: Gonzaga
- Season MVP: Matthew Dellavedova, Saint Mary's

Tournament
- Champions: Saint Mary's
- Runners-up: Gonzaga
- Finals MVP: Matthew Dellavedova, Saint Mary's

Basketball seasons
- ← 10–11 12–13 →

2011–12 West Coast Conference men's basketball standings
	Conf.				Overall
Team	W		L	PCT	W		L	PCT
No. 24 Saint Mary's†	14	–	2	.875	27	–	6	.818
Gonzaga	13	–	3	.813	26	–	7	.788
BYU	12	–	4	.750	26	–	9	.743
Loyola Marymount	11	–	5	.688	21	–	13	.618
San Francisco	8	–	8	.500	20	–	14	.588
San Diego	7	–	9	.438	13	–	18	.419
Pepperdine	4	–	12	.250	10	–	19	.345
Portland	3	–	13	.188	7	–	24	.226
Santa Clara	0	–	16	.000	8	–	22	.267
† Conference tournament winner Rankings from AP poll

The 2011–12 West Coast Conference men's basketball season begins with practices in October 2011 and ends with the 2012 West Coast Conference men's basketball tournament from February 29- March 5, 2012 at the Orleans Arena in Las Vegas. The regular season begins on the weekend of November 11, with the conference schedule starting on December 29.

This is the sixty-first season under the West Coast Conference name. In July 2011, a new faith based, private school joined the conference. BYU came from the Mountain West, the conferences first change since 1980.

== Pre-season ==
- Pre-season media day was held on October 27, 2011 at YouTube's headquarters in San Bruno, California.

=== 2011–12 West Coast Men's Basketball Media Poll ===
Rank, School (first-place votes), Points
1. Gonzaga University (7), 63
2. Saint Mary's College (1), 56
3. Brigham Young University (1), 52
4. University of San Francisco, 42
5. Santa Clara University, 35
6. Loyola Marymount University, 27
7. University of Portland, 25
8. Pepperdine University, 13
9. University of San Diego, 11

=== 2011–12 West Coast Men's Preseason All-West Conference Team ===
Player, School, Yr., Pos.
Brandon Davies, BYU, Jr., F
Matthew Dellavedova, Saint Mary's, Jr., G
Kevin Foster, Santa Clara, Jr., G
Rashad Green, San Francisco, Sr., G
Elias Harris, Gonzaga, Jr., F
Rob Jones, Saint Mary's, Sr., F
Nemanja Mitrovic, Portland, Sr., G
Robert Sacre, Gonzaga, RS-Sr., C
Drew Viney, Loyola Marymount, RS-Sr., F
Michael Williams, San Francisco, Jr., G

== Rankings ==
- Gonzaga was ranked in the pre-season poll at No. 23.

Legend
	Improvement in ranking
	Drop in ranking
RV	Received votes but were not ranked in Top 25 of poll

		Pre/ Wk 1	Wk 2	Wk 3	Wk 4	Wk 5	Wk 6	Wk 7	Wk 8	Wk 9	Wk 10	Wk 11	Wk 12	Wk 13	Wk 14	Wk 15	Wk 16	Wk 17	Wk 18	Wk 19	Final
BYU	AP														RV	RV	RV	RV			No Poll
BYU	C	RV	RV						RV			RV									
Gonzaga	AP	23	22	19	19	23	RV	RV	RV	25	21	RV	RV	24	RV	24	RV	RV	24	RV	No Poll
Gonzaga	C	23	23	19	18	22	RV	RV	RV	RV	23	RV	RV	RV	RV	24	RV	RV	25	RV	RV
Loyola Marymount	AP																				No Poll
Loyola Marymount	C																				
Pepperdine	AP																				No Poll
Pepperdine	C																				
Portland	AP																				No Poll
Portland	C																				
Saint Mary's	AP	RV	RV	RV						RV	RV	24	21	18	16	21	RV	RV	RV	24	No Poll
Saint Mary's	C	RV	RV	RV		RV	RV	RV	RV	RV	RV	23	20	16	13	16	23	21	18	16	RV
San Diego	AP																				No Poll
San Diego	C																				
San Francisco	AP																				No Poll
San Francisco	C																				
Santa Clara	AP																				No Poll
Santa Clara	C																				

== Non-Conference games ==
- Loyola Marymount defeated #17 UCLA 69-58 on November 11, 2011.
- BYU would lose to #11 Wisconsin in the Championship of the Chicago Invitational Challenge 73-56 on November 26, 2011.
- BYU would lose to #6 Baylor at the Marriott Center 86-83 on November 26, 2011.
- Portland would lose at #2 Kentucky 87-63 on November 26, 2011.
- Loyola Marymount defeated #25 Saint Louis 75-68 on November 29, 2011.
- Saint Mary's would lose to #6 Baylor in the Las Vegas Classic 72-59 on December 22, 2011.
- Portland would lose at #23 Saint Louis 73-53 on December 3, 2011.
- The WCC would go 1-1 in BracketBuster games. LMU defeated Valparaiso 61-53 while Saint Mary's lost to #16 Murray State 51-65.
- The WCC posted an overall record of 6-7 against the Pac-12 Conference for the 2011–12 season.

== Conference games ==
=== Composite Matrix ===
This table summarizes the head-to-head results between teams in conference play. (x) indicates games remaining this season.

	BYU	Gonzaga	LMU	Pepperdine	Portland	Saint Mary's	San Diego	San Francisco	Santa Clara
vs. Brigham Young	–	1–1	1–1	0–2	0–2	2–0	0–2	0–2	0–2
vs. Gonzaga	1–1	–	0–2	0–2	0–2	1–1	0–2	1–1	0–2
vs. Loyola Marymount	1–1	2–0	–	0–2	0–2	1–1	1–1	0–2	0–2
vs. Pepperdine	2–0	2–0	2–0	–	1–1	2–0	2–0	1–1	0–2
vs. Portland	2–0	2–0	2–0	1–1	–	2–0	2–0	2–0	0–2
vs. Saint Mary's	0–2	1–1	1–1	0–2	0–2	–	0–2	0–2	0–2
vs. San Diego	2–0	2–0	1–1	0–2	0–2	2–0	–	2–0	0–2
vs. San Francisco	2–0	1–1	2–0	1–1	0–2	2–0	0–2	–	0–2
vs. Santa Clara	2–0	2–0	2–0	2–0	2–0	2–0	2–0	2–0	–
Total	12–4	13–3	11–5	4–12	3–13	14–2	7–9	8–8	0–16

== Conference tournament ==
- February 29 – March 5, 2012 – West Coast Conference Basketball Tournament, Orleans Arena, Las Vegas, Nevada.

== Head coaches ==
Dave Rose, BYU
Mark Few, Gonzaga
Max Good, Loyola Marymount
Marty Wilson, Pepperdine
Eric Reveno, Portland
Randy Bennett, Saint Mary's
Bill Grier, San Diego
Rex Walters, San Francisco
Kerry Keating, Santa Clara

== Postseason ==
=== NCAA tournament ===
- The WCC set a personal record with 3 teams going to the NCAA Tourney. Gonzaga was a 7-seed in the East and Saint Mary's was a 7-seed in the Midwest. BYU was a 14-seed in the West.
- BYU played in the First Four in Dayton, Ohio. During the game, they set a record for the largest comeback in an NCAA tournament game, as they were down by 25 points at one point and came back to beat the Iona Gaels 78–72. The largest previous deficit overcome in the tournament was 22 points by Duke against Maryland in the 2001 national semifinals. BYU advanced to Louisville where they would lose in the second round to the Marquette Eagles 88-68.
- Gonzaga received a bye to the second round, where they were sent to Pittsburgh. They managed to overwhelm current Big East and future Big 12 member West Virginia with their outside passing 77-54 to advance to the third round. The Big Ten's #7 ranked nationally Ohio State Buckeyes proved to be too much for Gonzaga as they squeaked by 73-66. Ohio State would advance to the Final Four.
- Saint Mary's received a bye to the second round and was sent to Omaha. They faced Big Ten Conference member Purdue and were upset 72-69.

=== NIT ===
- No WCC teams were selected for the 2012 NIT.

=== CBI ===
- San Francisco played at Pac-12 Conference member Washington State in the first round of the CiT. After keeping it within 5 points in the first half, Washington State used speed to pull away in the second half and advance 89-75. Washington State would go on to advance to the CBI championship.

=== CiT ===
- Loyola Marymount participated in their second consecutive CiT tournament. They would host first and second-round games. In the first round they beat Big West member Cal State Fullerton 88-79. In the second round it took overtime, but they managed to get by the Big Sky's Weber State Wildcats 84-78. In the third round they would visit the WAC's Utah State Aggies, and despite a fast-paced game, Utah State would use foul shots to pull away in the last 5 minutes 77-69. Utah State would go on to advance to the CiT championship game.

== Awards and honors ==
=== Primetime Performers Honor Roll by Collegesports360.com ===
- Matthew Dellavedova, Saint Mary's, Week of Jan 9-15

=== Player-of-the-Week ===
- Nov. 14 – Ashley Hamilton, Loyola Marymount
- Nov. 28 – Evan Roquemore, Santa Clara
- Dec. 12 – Angelo Caloiaro, San Francisco
- Dec. 26 – Kevin Pangos, Gonzaga
- Jan. 9 – Rob Jones, Saint Mary's
- Jan. 23 – Anthony Ireland, Loyola Marymount
- Feb. 6 – Brandon Davies, BYU
- Feb. 20 – Anthony Ireland, Loyola Marymount
- Nov. 21 – Kevin Pangos, Gonzaga
- Dec. 5 – Noah Hartsock, BYU
- Dec. 19 – Elias Harris, Gonzaga
- Jan. 2 – Brandon Davies, BYU
- Jan. 16 – Matthew Dellavedova, Saint Mary's
- Jan. 30 – Perris Blackwell, San Francisco
- Feb. 13 – Kevin Pangos, Gonzaga
- Feb. 27 – Elias Harris, Gonzaga

=== Player-of-the-Month ===
- November – Rob Jones, Saint Mary's
- December – Noah Hartsock, BYU
- January – Matthew Dellavedova- Saint Mary's
- February – Rob Jones, Saint Mary's

=== All West Coast Conference teams ===
Voting was by conference coaches:

- Player of The Year: Matthew Dellavedova, Saint Mary's
- Newcomer of The Year: Kevin Pangos, Gonzaga
- Defensive Player of The Year: Robert Sacre, Gonzaga
- Coach of The Year: Max Good, Loyola Marymount

ALL CONFERENCE:

Name	School	Pos.	Year
Angelo Caloiaro	San Francisco	F	Senior
Brandon Davies	BYU	F	Junior
Matthew Dellavedova	Saint Mary's	G	Junior
Elias Harris	Gonzaga	F	Junior
Noah Hartsock	BYU	F	Senior
Anthony Ireland	Loyola Marymount	G	Sophomore
Rob Jones	Saint Mary's	F	Senior
Kevin Pangos	Gonzaga	G	Freshman
Robert Sacre	Gonzaga	C	Senior
Drew Viney	Loyola Marymount	F	Senior

HONORABLE MENTION:

Name	School
Perris Blackwell	San Francisco
Matt Carlino	BYU
Johnny Dee	San Diego
Rashad Green	San Francisco
Stephen Holt	Saint Mary's
Corbin Moore	Pepperdine

ALL-FRESHMAN

Name	School	Position
Gary Bell, Jr.	Gonzaga	G
Matt Carlino	BYU	G
Johnny Dee	San Diego	G
Kevin Pangos	Gonzaga	G
Brad Waldow	Saint Mary's	F

ALL-ACADEMIC

Player, School	Year	GPA	Major
Craig Cusick, BYU	Junior	3.59	Accounting
Taylor Darby, Pepperdine	Senior	3.37	Integrated Marketing
Matthew Dellavedova, Saint Mary's	Junior	3.61	Psychology
Cody Doolin, San Francisco	Sophomore	3.61	Finance
Michael Hart, Gonzaga	Junior	3.63	Business Administration
Beau Levesque, Saint Mary's	Sophomore	3.70	Sport Management
Corbin Moore, Pepperdine	Senior	3.24	Economics
Ryan Nicholas, Portland	Sophomore	3.44	Psychology
Justin Raffington, San Francisco	Sophomore	3.50	Advertising
Jay Wey, San Francisco	Senior	3.73	Business Administration

== See also ==
- 2011–12 NCAA Division I men's basketball season
- West Coast Conference men's basketball tournament
- 2011–12 West Coast Conference women's basketball season
- West Coast Conference women's basketball tournament
- 2012 West Coast Conference women's basketball tournament
