= 2012 West Coast Conference men's basketball tournament =

American collegiate men's postseason basketball tournament

- 2012 WCC Tournament Logo
- Classification: Division I
- Season: 2011–12
- Teams: 9
- Site: Orleans Arena; Paradise, NV
- Finals site: Orleans Arena; Paradise, NV
- Champions: Saint Mary's (3rd title)
- Winning coach: Randy Bennett (2nd title)
- MVP: Matthew Dellavedova (Saint Mary's)
- Television: ESPN/ESPN2/ESPNU/BYUtv

2011–12 West Coast Conference men's basketball standings
	Conf.				Overall
Team	W		L	PCT	W		L	PCT
No. 24 Saint Mary's†	14	–	2	.875	27	–	6	.818
Gonzaga	13	–	3	.813	26	–	7	.788
BYU	12	–	4	.750	26	–	9	.743
Loyola Marymount	11	–	5	.688	21	–	13	.618
San Francisco	8	–	8	.500	20	–	14	.588
San Diego	7	–	9	.438	13	–	18	.419
Pepperdine	4	–	12	.250	10	–	19	.345
Portland	3	–	13	.188	7	–	24	.226
Santa Clara	0	–	16	.000	8	–	22	.267
† Conference tournament winner Rankings from AP poll

The 2012 West Coast Conference men's basketball tournament was held February 29 though March 5 at the Orleans Arena in the Las Vegas-area community of Paradise, Nevada.

== Format ==
With the addition of BYU to the conference, a new format was introduced for the 2012 tournament. The tournament began on Wednesday instead of Friday, and a first round 8 vs. 9 seed game was added. The 8/9 game was streamed live on wccsports.com on Wednesday, 29 February. The second round took place on Thursday, 1 March with #5 San Francisco playing the winner of the 8/9 game and #6 San Diego playing #7 Pepperdine. BYUtv Sports broadcast the second round of the tournament. The tournament quarterfinals were held on Friday, 2 March, and were broadcast on ESPNU. They featured #3 BYU against the 6/7 game winner and #4 Loyola Marymount against the 5/8/9 winner. The conference semifinals were held on Saturday, 3 March, and were broadcast on ESPN2. #1 Saint Mary's played the 4/5/8/9 winner and #2 Gonzaga played the 3/6/7 winner. The championship game was played on Monday, 5 March 2012 and was broadcast on television by ESPN and on national radio by Dial Global Sports, formerly Westwood One.

== Seeds ==
2012 West Coast Conference men's basketball tournament seeds
Seed	School	Conference Record	Overall Record (End of Regular Season)	Tiebreaker
1.	Saint Mary's	14–2	25–5	
2.	Gonzaga	13–3	24–5	
3.	BYU	12–4	24–7	
4.	Loyola Marymount	11–5	19–11	
5.	San Francisco	8–8	18–12	
6.	San Diego	7–9	12–17	
7.	Pepperdine	4–12	10–18	
8.	Portland	3–13	6–23	
9.	Santa Clara	0–16	8–21	

== Schedule ==
Session	Game	Time*	Matchup^{#}
First Round – Wednesday, February 29
1	1	6:00 PM	#8 Portland vs #9 Santa Clara
Second Round – Thursday, March 1
2	2	6:00 PM	#5 San Francisco vs #8 Portland
2	3	8:00 PM	#6 San Diego vs #7 Pepperdine
Quarterfinals – Friday, March 2
3	4	6:00 PM	#4 Loyola Marymount vs. #5 San Francisco
3	5	8:00 PM	#3 BYU vs. #6 San Diego
Semifinals – Saturday, March 3
4	6	6:00 PM	#1 Saint Mary's vs. #5 San Francisco
4	7	8:00 PM	#2 Gonzaga vs. #3 BYU
Championship Game – Monday, March 5
5	8	6:00 PM	#1 Saint Mary's vs. #2 Gonzaga
*Game Times in PT. #-Rankings denote tournament seeding.

== Bracket and Scores ==
First round Wednesday, February 29, 2012 wccsports.com
8	Portland	74
9	Santa Clara	70

Second round Thursday, March 1, 2012; BYUtv
5	San Francisco	87
8	Portland	66
6	San Diego	76
7	Pepperdine	54

Quarterfinals; Friday, March 2, 2012; ESPNU
4	Loyola Marymount	60
5	San Francisco	67
3	BYU	73
6	San Diego	68

Semifinals; Saturday, March 3, 2012; ESPN2
1	Saint Mary's	83
5	San Francisco	78
2	Gonzaga	77
3	BYU	58

Championship; Monday, March 5, 2012; ESPN
1	Saint Mary's	78^{OT}
2	#24 Gonzaga	74

== Game summaries ==
wccsports.com

Feb 29
6:00 pm

Recap

Portland Pilots 74, Santa Clara Broncos 70
Scoring by half: 41-35, 33-35
Pts: Ryan Nicholas 24; Rebs: Ryan Nicholas 11; Asts: David Carr 6	Pts: Evan Roquemore 21; Rebs: 2 tied with 4 Asts: Evan Roquemore 3

Orleans Arena
Attendance: N/A
Referees: Frank Harvey, Kevin Brill, Michael Irving

BYUtv

Mar 1
6:00 pm

Recap

San Francisco Dons 87, Portland Pilots 66
Scoring by half: 51-32, 36-34
Pts: 2 tied with 19; Rebs: Cole Dickerson 10; Asts: 2 tied with 4	Pts: Nemanja Mitrovic 16; Rebs: Ryan Nicholas 7 Asts: Tim Douglas 4

Orleans Arena
Attendance: N/A
Referees: Tom Wood, Mike Reed, Randy Burkhart

BYUtv

Mar 1
8:30 pm

Recap

San Diego Toreros 76, Pepperdine Waves 54
Scoring by half: 33-22, 43-32
Pts: Johnny Dee 30; Rebs: Johnny Dee 5 Asts: Christopher Anderson 8	Pts: Corbin Moore 16; Rebs: Corbin Moore 12; Asts: 2 tied with 2

Orleans Arena
Attendance: 1,919
Referees: James Giron, Ken Ditty, Rick Batsell

ESPNU

Mar 2
6:00 pm

Recap

Loyola Marymount Lions 60, San Francisco Dons 67
Scoring by half: 35-34, 25-33
Pts: Ashley Hamilton 14; Rebs: Ashley Hamilton 8 Asts: Anthony Ireland 5	Pts: Michael Williams 19; Rebs: 2 tied with 7 Asts: Angelo Caloiaro 5

Orleans Arena
Attendance: N/A
Referees: Michael Greenstein, Tony Padilla, Bobby McRoy

ESPNU

Mar 2
8:30 pm

Recap

BYU Cougars 73, San Diego Toreros 68
Scoring by half: 34-34, 39-34
Pts: Noah Hartsock 19; Rebs: Charles Abouo 7 Asts: Matt Carlino 7	Pts: Dennis Kramer 17; Rebs: Dennis Kramer 9 Asts: Christopher Anderson 6

Orleans Arena
Attendance: 5,037
Referees: Scott Harris, Sam Haddad, Mike Peterson

ESPN2

Mar 3
6:00 pm

Recap

Saint Mary's Gaels 83, San Francisco Dons 78
Scoring by half: 34-38, 49-40
Pts: Clint Steindl 19; Rebs: Rob Jones 13; Asts: Matthew Dellavedova 6	Pts: Cody Doolin 28; Rebs: Angelo Caloiaro 7 Asts: Angelo Caloiaro 6

Orleans Arena
Attendance: N/A
Referees: Tom Wood, Deron White, Frank Harvey

ESPN2

Mar 3
8:30 pm

Recap

Gonzaga Bulldogs 77, BYU Cougars 58
Scoring by half: 38-26, 39-32
Pts: Kevin Pangos 30; Rebs: Elias Harris 15; Asts: 2 tied with 4	Pts: Brandon Davies 17; Rebs: Charles Abouo 10; Asts: Matt Carlino 4

Orleans Arena
Attendance: 7,828
Referees: Ken Ditty, Gregory Nixon, Michael Eggers

ESPN

Mar 5
6:00 pm

Recap

Saint Mary's Gaels 78, #24 Gonzaga Bulldogs 74 (OT)
Scoring by half: 36-36, 32-32 Overtime: 10-6
Pts: Matthew Dellavedova 22; Rebs: Rob Jones 9 Asts: Matthew Dellavedova 4	Pts: Elias Harris 22; Rebs: Elias Harris 13; Asts: David Stockton 4

Orleans Arena
Attendance: 6,826
Referees: Dick Cartmell, Mike Reed, Michael Greenstein

== All tournament conference team ==
Name	School	Pos.	Year	Ht.	Hometown
Matthew Dellavedova	Saint Mary's	G	Junior	6' 4"	Maryborough, Victoria, Australia
Cody Doolin	San Francisco	G	Sophomore	6' 2"	Austin, Texas
Elias Harris	Gonzaga	F	Junior	6' 7"	Speyer, Germany
Rob Jones	Saint Mary's	F	Redshirt Senior	6' 6"	San Francisco, California
Kevin Pangos	Gonzaga	G	Freshman	6' 1"	Newmarket, Ontario

== See also ==
- 2012 West Coast Conference women's basketball tournament
