= 2011–12 San Francisco Dons men's basketball team =

American college basketball season

2011–12 San Francisco Dons men's basketball

CBI, First Round
- Conference: West Coast Conference
- Record: 20–14 (8–8 WCC)
- Head coach: Rex Walters (4th season)
- Assistant coaches: Danny Yoshikawa; Michael Lee; Justin Bauman
- Home arena: War Memorial Gymnasium

2011–12 West Coast Conference men's basketball standings
	Conf.				Overall
Team	W		L	PCT	W		L	PCT
No. 24 Saint Mary's†	14	–	2	.875	27	–	6	.818
Gonzaga	13	–	3	.813	26	–	7	.788
BYU	12	–	4	.750	26	–	9	.743
Loyola Marymount	11	–	5	.688	21	–	13	.618
San Francisco	8	–	8	.500	20	–	14	.588
San Diego	7	–	9	.438	13	–	18	.419
Pepperdine	4	–	12	.250	10	–	19	.345
Portland	3	–	13	.188	7	–	24	.226
Santa Clara	0	–	16	.000	8	–	22	.267
† Conference tournament winner Rankings from AP poll

The 2011–12 San Francisco Dons men's basketball team represented the University of San Francisco in the 2011–12 college basketball season. This was head coach Rex Walters fourth season at San Francisco. The Dons played their home games at the War Memorial Gymnasium and are members of the West Coast Conference. They finished the season 20–14, 8–8 in West Coast play to finish in fifth place. They lost in the semifinals of the West Coast Basketball tournament to Saint Mary's. They were invited to the 2012 College Basketball Invitational where they lost in the first round to Washington State.

== Roster ==
2011–12 San Francisco Dons men's basketball team
Players
Coaches

Pos.	#	Name	Height	Weight	Year	Previous school	Hometown
G	0	Dominique O’Connor	5 ft 11 in (1.8 m)	165 lb (75 kg)	RS So	Westchester	Los Angeles, CA
F	1	Charles Standifer	6 ft 5 in (1.96 m)	185 lb (84 kg)	So	Capital Christian	Sacramento, CA
G	2	Avery Johnson	6 ft 3 in (1.91 m)	180 lb (82 kg)	So	Ocean View	Huntington Beach, CA
G	5	Michael Williams	6 ft 0 in (1.83 m)	170 lb (77 kg)	Jr	Taft	Van Nuys, CA
G	10	Chris Adams	6 ft 4 in (1.93 m)	170 lb (77 kg)	Fr	Evelyn Mack Academy	Covina, CA
C	11	Justin Raffington	6 ft 9 in (2.06 m)	225 lb (102 kg)	So	Urspring Academy	Bad Krozingen, Germany
G	13	Rashad Green	6 ft 4 in (1.93 m)	195 lb (88 kg)	Sr	Manhattan	North Babylon, NY
F	15	Khalil Murphy	6 ft 7 in (2.01 m)	235 lb (107 kg)	RS Fr	Fishburne	Willingboro, NJ
F	22	Perris Blackwell	6 ft 9 in (2.06 m)	240 lb (109 kg)	Jr	Etiwanda	Etiwanda, CA
F	23	Mark Tollefsen	6 ft 9 in (2.06 m)	215 lb (98 kg)	Fr	San Ramon Valley	Danville, CA
F	25	Cole Dickerson	6 ft 7 in (2.01 m)	225 lb (102 kg)	So	Federal Way	Federal Way, WA
G	30	Jay Wey	6 ft 2 in (1.88 m)	185 lb (84 kg)	RS Sr	UC San Diego	Cupertino, CA
G	31	Gavin Hoffman	6 ft 4 in (1.93 m)	195 lb (88 kg)	Fr	Jesuit	Portland, OR
F	32	Angelo Caloiaro	6 ft 8 in (2.03 m)	225 lb (102 kg)	Sr	Archbishop Mitty	Saratoga, CA
G	45	Cody Doolin	6 ft 2 in (1.88 m)	170 lb (77 kg)	So	Westlake	Austin, TX

Head coach

- Rex Walters (Kansas)

Assistant coach(es)

- Danny Yoshikawa (UC Davis)
- Michael Lee (Kansas)
- Justin Bauman (Kansas)

Legend

- (C) Team captain
- (S) Suspended
- (I) Ineligible
- (W) Walk-on
- Injured
- Current redshirt

== Schedule and results ==
Date time, TV	Rank^{#}	Opponent^{#}	Result	Record	High points	High rebounds	High assists	Site (attendance) city, state
Regular Season
11/11/2011*; 6:00pm		North Dakota State; 2011 Hilltop Challenge	L 63–75	0–1	23 – Blackwell	8 – (2 tied)	4 – Green	War Memorial Gymnasium (1,175); San Francisco, California
11/12/2011*; 6:00pm		Northern Arizona; 2011 Hilltop Challenge	W 69–50	1–1	16 – Williams	11 – Caloiaro	3 – Doolin	War Memorial Gymnasium (1,119); San Francisco, California
11/13/2011*; 3:30pm		Louisiana–Lafayette; 2011 Hilltop Challenge	W 71–70	2–1	18 – Caloiaro	10 – Caloiaro	2 – (4 tied)	War Memorial Gymnasium (1,165); San Francisco, California
11/16/2011*; 8:00pm		San Jose State	W 83–81 ^{OT}	3–1	19 – Caloiaro	13 – Caloiaro	5 – (3 tied)	War Memorial Gymnasium (2,090); San Francisco, California
11/19/2011*; 3:00pm, RTNW		at Seattle	W 69–63	4–1	15 – Williams	8 – Caloiaro	2 – (2 tied)	KeyArena (4,140); Seattle, Washington
11/23/2011*; 9:30pm, FCS Pacific		vs. Dartmouth; Great Alaska Shootout	W 71–69	5–1	23 – Williams	5 – (3 tied)	3 – (3 tied)	Sullivan Arena (4,586); Anchorage, Alaska
11/25/2011*; 6:30pm, FCS Pacific		vs. Murray State; Great Alaska Shootout Semifinals	L 67–70	5–2	23 – Green	5 – Doolin	5 – Doolin	Sullivan Arena (4,661); Anchorage, Alaska
11/26/2011*; 6:30pm, FCS Pacific		vs. New Mexico State; Great Alaska Shootout 3rd Place Game	L 71–81	5–3	22 – Caloiaro	7 – Blackwell	7 – Doolin	Sullivan Arena (4,327); Anchorage, Alaska
12/01/2011*; 6:00pm		at Montana	W 65–62	6–3	15 – Caoliaro	9 – Green	3 – O'Connor	Dahlberg Arena (3,212); Missoula, Montana
12/04/2011*; 2:00pm		Pacific Union	W 90–36	7–3	15 – Raffington	9 – (2 tied)	5 – Johnson	War Memorial Gymnasium (1,349); San Francisco, California
12/10/2011*; 7:00pm		Pacific	W 79–69	8–3	29 – Caoliaro	11 – Caoliaro	4 – Green	War Memorial Gymnasium (2,107); San Francisco, California
12/17/2011*; 7:00pm		Menlo	W 66–36	9–3	19 – Blackwell	13 – Blackwell	3 – Dickerson	War Memorial Gymnasium (1,458); San Francisco, California
12/22/2011*; 4:00pm		at Holy Cross	L 83–88	9–4	23 – Green	7 – Green	4 – (4 tied)	Hart Center (1,326); Worcester, Massachusetts
12/29/2011; 7:00pm		at Pepperdine	L 61–77	9–5 (0–1)	14 – Caloiaro	7 – Blackwell	3 – (4 tied)	Firestone Fieldhouse (821); Malibu, California
12/31/2011; 5:00pm		Loyola Marymount	L 76–77 ^{OT}	9–6 (0–2)	26 – Caloiaro	8 – Blackwell	5 – (2 tied)	War Memorial Gymnasium (1,460); San Francisco, California
01/03/2012*; 7:00pm		Morgan State	W 87–74	10–6	19 – (2 tied)	9 – Caloiaro	5 – Green	War Memorial Gymnasium (1,234); San Francisco, California
01/07/2012; 3:30pm, BYUtv		at BYU	L 56–81	10–7 (0–3)	10 – Williams	10 – Blackwell	3 – Johnson	Marriott Center (14,823); Provo, Utah
01/09/2012; 7:00pm, CSNCA		at Saint Mary's	L 72–87	10–8 (0–4)	20 – Caloiaro	7 – Green	6 – (2 tied)	McKeon Pavilion (3,500); Moraga, California
01/12/2012; 7:00pm		Portland	W 104–70	11–8 (1–4)	19 – Green	9 – Blackwell	5 – (2 tied)	War Memorial Gymnasium (1,450); San Francisco, California
01/14/2012; 1:30pm, CSNCA		Pepperdine	W 78–63	12–8 (2–4)	17 – Williams	10 – Caloiaro	5 – Doolin	War Memorial Gymnasium; San Francisco, California
01/19/2012; 7:00pm, ESPNU		at Gonzaga	L 63–74	12–9 (2–5)	14 – Caloiaro	9 – Caloairo	2 – Williams	McCarthey Athletic Center (6,000); Spokane, Washington
01/21/2012; 2:00pm, CSN+		at Portland	W 72–71	13–9 (3–5)	15 – Doolin	7 – Dickerson	3 – (2 tied)	Chiles Center (2,132); Portland, Oregon
01/26/2012; 7:00pm, CSNCA		at Santa Clara	W 90–77	14–9 (4–5)	20 – Caloiaro	9 – Green	5 – Caloiaro	Leavey Center (2,084); Santa Clara, California
01/28/2012; 7:00pm, CSNBA		San Diego	W 84–70	15–9 (5–5)	26 – Blackwell	8 – Blackwell	9 – Caloiaro	War Memorial Gymnasium (3,075); San Francisco, California
02/04/2012; 7:00pm		at Loyola Marymount	L 88–90	15–10 (5–6)	24 – Green	7 – Green	7 – Doolin	Gersten Pavilion (2,409); Los Angeles, California
02/09/2012; 8:00pm, ESPNU		Santa Clara	W 85–69	16–10 (6–6)	21 – Doolin	13 – Caloiaro	7 – Doolin	War Memorial Gymnasium (2,673); San Francisco, California
02/11/2012; 6:00pm, CSNCA+		at San Diego	W 81–70	17–10 (7–6)	18 – Blackwell	11 – Blackwell	9 – Doolin	Jenny Craig Pavilion (2,883); San Diego, California
02/16/2012; 7:00pm, ESPNU		BYU	L 84–85	17–11 (7–7)	23 – Caloiaro	11 – Blackwell	7 – Doolin	War Memorial Gymnasium (2,875); San Francisco, California
02/18/2012; 5:00pm, CSNCA		Gonzaga	W 66–65	18–11 (8–7)	16 – Green	10 – Blackwell	6 – Doolin	War Memorial Gymnasium (4,500); San Francisco, California
02/25/2012; 8:00pm, CSNCA		Saint Mary's	L 60–67	18–12 (8–8)	13 – Doolin	8 – Caloiaro	5 – Caloiaro	War Memorial Gymnasium (4,500); San Francisco, California
2012 West Coast Conference men's basketball tournament
03/01/2012; 6:00pm, BYUtv	(5)	vs. (8) Portland; WCC Second Round	W 87–66	19–12	19 – (2 tied)	10 – Dickerson	4 – (2 tied)	Orleans Arena (1,919); Las Vegas, Nevada
03/02/2012; 6:00pm, ESPNU	(5)	vs. (4) Loyola Marymount; WCC Quarterfinals	W 67–60	20–12	19 – Williams	7 – (2 tied)	5 – Caloiaro	Orleans Arena (5,037); Las Vegas, Nevada
03/03/2012; 6:00pm, ESPN2	(5)	vs. (1) Saint Mary's; WCC Semifinals	L 78–83	20–13	28 – Doolin	7 – Caloiaro	6 – Caloiaro	Orleans Arena (7,828); Las Vegas, Nevada
2012 College Basketball Invitational
03/14/2012*; 7:00pm, HDNet		Washington State; CBI First Round	L 75–89	20–14	20 – Williams	6 – Dickerson	11 – Dickerson	War Memorial Gymnasium (1,277); San Francisco, California
*Non-conference game. ^{#}Rankings from AP Poll. (#) Tournament seedings in parentheses.
