= 2011–12 Saint Mary's Gaels men's basketball team =

American college basketball season

2011–12 Saint Mary's Gaels men's basketball

WCC regular season & tournament champions

NCAA tournament, First round
- Conference: West Coast Conference

Ranking
- AP: No. 24
- Record: 27–6 (14–2 WCC)
- Head coach: Randy Bennett (11th season)
- Assistant coaches: Rick Croy; Adam Caporn; Eran Ganot
- Home arena: McKeon Pavilion

2011–12 West Coast Conference men's basketball standings
| | Conf. | | | | Overall |
| Team | W | | L | PCT | W | | L | PCT |
|---|---|---|---|---|---|---|---|---|
| No. 24 Saint Mary's† | 14 | – | 2 | .875 | 27 | – | 6 | .818 |
| Gonzaga | 13 | – | 3 | .813 | 26 | – | 7 | .788 |
| BYU | 12 | – | 4 | .750 | 26 | – | 9 | .743 |
| Loyola Marymount | 11 | – | 5 | .688 | 21 | – | 13 | .618 |
| San Francisco | 8 | – | 8 | .500 | 20 | – | 14 | .588 |
| San Diego | 7 | – | 9 | .438 | 13 | – | 18 | .419 |
| Pepperdine | 4 | – | 12 | .250 | 10 | – | 19 | .345 |
| Portland | 3 | – | 13 | .188 | 7 | – | 24 | .226 |
| Santa Clara | 0 | – | 16 | .000 | 8 | – | 22 | .267 |
† Conference tournament winner Rankings from AP poll

The 2011–12 Saint Mary's Gaels men's basketball team represented Saint Mary's College of California in the 2011–12 college basketball season. This was head coach Randy Bennett's eleventh season at Saint Mary's. The Gaels compete in the West Coast Conference and played their home games at the McKeon Pavilion. They finished the season 27–6, 14–2 in WCC play to be crowned West Coast Conference regular season champions. They were also champions of the West Coast Basketball tournament to earn the conference's automatic bid to the 2012 NCAA tournament where they lost in the second round to Purdue.

== Roster ==
| # | Name | Height | Weight (lbs.) | Position | Class | Hometown | Previous Team(s) |
|---|---|---|---|---|---|---|---|
| 00 | Brad Waldow | 6'9" | 250 | F | RS Fr. | Shingle Springs, CA, U.S. | Ponderosa HS |
| 1 | Jorden Page | 6'1" | 180 | G | So. | Maroochydore, Queensland, Australia | AIS |
| 2 | Paul McCoy | 5'11" | 175 | G | Jr. | Portland, OR, U.S. | Grant HS; SMU |
| 3 | Mitchell Young | 6'9" | 235 | F | Jr. | Logan, Queensland, Australia | AIS |
| 4 | Matthew Dellavedova | 6'4" | 190 | G | Jr. | Maryborough, Victoria, Australia | AIS |
| 5 | Kyle Rowley | 7'0" | 280 | C | Jr. | Arima, Trinidad | Lake Forest Acad. Northwestern |
| 10 | Zach Sanchez | 6'1" | 175 | G | RS Fr. | Bonita, CA, U.S. | Bonita Vista HS |
| 11 | Clint Steindl | 6'7" | 195 | F | Sr. | Mackay, Queensland, Australia | AIS |
| 12 | Jordan Giusti | 6'2" | 185 | G | Fr. | San Ramon, CA, U.S. | San Ramon Valley HS |
| 14 | Stephen Holt | 6'4" | 195 | G | So. | Portland, OR, U.S. | Jesuit HS |
| 15 | Beau Levesque | 6'6" | 220 | F | So. | Lafayette, CA, U.S. | De La Salle HS |
| 22 | Rob Jones | 6'6" | 240 | F | RS Sr. | San Francisco, CA, U.S. | Archbishop Riordan HS; San Diego |
| 25 | Tim Williams | 6'9" | 235 | F | RS Jr. | Antioch, CA, U.S. | Antioch HS |
| 30 | Kenton Walker II | 6'9" | 240 | F | RS Sr. | San Diego, CA, U.S. | Scripps Ranch HS; Creighton |
| 42 | Eividas Petrulis | 6'7" | 210 | F | RFr. | Vilnius, Lithuania | Šarūnas Marčiulionis Academy |
| | Matt Hodgson | 6'11" | 225 | C | Jr. | Booval, Queensland, Australia | Ipswich Grammar |

== Schedule and results ==
- All times are Pacific

| Date time, TV | Rank^{#} | Opponent^{#} | Result | Record | Site (attendance) city, state |
Non-conference regular season
| 11/11/2011*; 7:00pm, CSNBA | | Fresno Pacific | W 98–58 | 1–0 | McKeon Pavilion (2,453); Moraga, CA |
| 11/14/2011*; 11:00pm, ESPN | | Northern Iowa; ESPN Season Tip-Off Marathon | W 57–41 | 2–0 | McKeon Pavilion (2,053); Moraga, CA |
| 11/23/2011*; 4:00pm, ROOT | | at Denver | L 58–70 | 2–1 | Magness Arena (5,408); Denver, CO |
| 11/27/2011*; 4:00pm, CSNBA | | San Francisco State; Shamrock Office Solutions Classic | W 86–52 | 3–1 | McKeon Pavilion (1,791); Moraga, CA |
| 11/28/2011*; 7:30pm, CSNBA | | Weber State; Shamrock Office Solutions Classic | W 87–70 | 4–1 | McKeon Pavilion (1,488); Moraga, CA |
| 12/03/2011*; 7:00pm, CSNBA | | at Cal Poly | W 59–54 | 5–1 | Mott Gym (2,878); San Luis Obispo, CA |
| 12/13/2011*; 7:00pm, CSNBA | | Jackson State | W 77–53 | 6–1 | McKeon Pavilion (2,401); Moraga, CA |
| 12/15/2011*; 7:00pm, CSNBA | | North Carolina A&T | W 84–45 | 7–1 | McKeon Pavilion (2,368); Moraga, CA |
| 12/17/2011*; 7:00pm, CSNBA | | Bethune-Cookman; Las Vegas Classic | W 77–52 | 8–1 | McKeon Pavilion (2,380); Moraga, CA |
| 12/19/2011*; 7:00pm, CSNBA | | Kennesaw State; Las Vegas Classic | W 74–51 | 9–1 | McKeon Pavilion (2,548); Moraga, CA |
| 12/20/2011*; 7:00pm, CSNBA | | Eastern Washington | W 77–61 | 10–1 | McKeon Pavilion (2,796); Moraga, CA |
| 12/22/2011*; 7:30pm, ESPN3 | | vs. No. 6 Baylor; Las Vegas Classic Semifinals | L 59–72 | 10–2 | Orleans Arena (1,526); Paradise, NV |
| 12/23/2011*; 8:30pm, ESPN3 | | vs. Missouri State; Las Vegas Classic 3rd place | W 77–61 | 11–2 | Orleans Arena (1,526); Las Vegas, NV |
WCC regular season
| 12/29/2011; 8:00pm, ESPN2 | | BYU | W 98–82 | 12–2 (1–0) | McKeon Pavilion (3,500); Moraga, CA |
| 12/31/2011; 3:00pm, CSNCA | | at Pepperdine | W 74–45 | 13–2 (2–0) | Firestone Fieldhouse (741); Malibu, CA |
| 01/05/2012; 6:00pm, ESPNU | | at San Diego | W 78–72 | 14–2 (3–0) | Jenny Craig Pavilion (3,317); San Diego, CA |
| 01/09/2012; 7:00pm, CSNCA | | San Francisco | W 87–72 | 15–2 (4–0) | McKeon Pavilion (3,500); Moraga, CA |
| 01/12/2012; 8:00pm, ESPN2 | | No. 21 Gonzaga | W 83–62 | 16–2 (5–0) | McKeon Pavilion (3,500); Moraga, CA |
| 01/14/2012; 8:00pm, CSNBA | | Portland | W 69–61 | 17–2 (6–0) | McKeon Pavilion (3,500); Moraga, CA |
| 01/19/2012; 7:00pm, CSNBA | No. 24 | Pepperdine | W 61–47 | 18–2 (7–0) | McKeon Pavilion (3,500); Moraga, CA |
| 01/21/2012; 7:00pm, CSNCA | No. 24 | at Santa Clara | W 93–77 | 19–2 (8–0) | Leavey Center (4,700); Santa Clara, CA |
| 01/26/2012; 7:00pm, CSNCA | No. 21 | at Loyola Marymount | W 71–64 | 20–2 (9–0) | Gersten Pavilion (2,243); Los Angeles, CA |
| 01/28/2012; 6:00pm, ESPNU | No. 21 | at BYU | W 80–66 | 21–2 (10–0) | Marriott Center (22,700); Provo, UT |
| 02/02/2012; 7:00pm, CSNCA | No. 18 | San Diego | W 84–73 | 22–2 (11–0) | McKeon Pavilion (3,500); Moraga, CA |
| 02/09/2012; 8:00pm, ESPN2 | No. 16 | at Gonzaga | L 59–73 | 22–3 (11–1) | McCarthey Athletic Center (6,000); Spokane, WA |
| 02/11/2012; 7:00pm, CSNCA+ | No. 16 | Santa Clara | W 82–67 | 23–3 (12–1) | McKeon Pavilion (3,500); Moraga, CA |
| 02/15/2012; 7:30pm, CSNCA | No. 21 | Loyola Marymount | L 60–75 | 23–4 (12–2) | McKeon Pavilion (3,500); Moraga, CA |
| 02/18/2012*; 3:00pm, ESPN | No. 21 | at No. 16 Murray State; ESPN BracketBusters | L 51–65 | 23–5 | CFSB Center (8,825); Murray, KY |
| 02/23/2012; 7:00pm, ESPNU | | at Portland | W 70–43 | 24–5 (13–2) | Chiles Center (2,829); Portland, OR |
| 02/25/2012; 8:00pm, CSNCA | | at San Francisco | W 67–60 | 25–5 (14–2) | War Memorial Gymnasium (4,500); San Francisco, CA |
WCC tournament
| 03/03/2012; 6:00pm, ESPN2 | (1) | vs. (5) San Francisco; Semifinals | W 83–78 | 26–5 | Orleans Arena (7,828); Las Vegas, NV |
| 03/05/2012; 6:00pm, ESPN | (1) | vs. (2) No. 24 Gonzaga; Championship | W 78–74 ^{OT} | 27–5 | Orleans Arena (6,826); Las Vegas, NV |
NCAA tournament
| 03/16/2012*; 4:27pm, truTV | (7 MW) No. 24 | vs. (10 MW) Purdue; Second Round | L 69–72 | 27–6 | CenturyLink Center Omaha (16,833); Omaha, NE |
*Non-conference game. ^{#}Rankings from AP Poll. (#) Tournament seedings in parentheses.
