= 2011–12 Gonzaga Bulldogs men's basketball team =

American college basketball season

2011–12 Gonzaga Bulldogs men's basketball

NCAA tournament, Round of 32
- Conference: West Coast Conference
- Record: 26–7 (13–3 WCC)
- Head coach: Mark Few (13th season)
- Assistant coaches: Tommy Lloyd (11th season); Ray Giacoletti (5th season); Donny Daniels (2nd season)
- Home arena: McCarthey Athletic Center

2011–12 West Coast Conference men's basketball standings
	Conf.				Overall
Team	W		L	PCT	W		L	PCT
No. 24 Saint Mary's†	14	–	2	.875	27	–	6	.818
Gonzaga	13	–	3	.813	26	–	7	.788
BYU	12	–	4	.750	26	–	9	.743
Loyola Marymount	11	–	5	.688	21	–	13	.618
San Francisco	8	–	8	.500	20	–	14	.588
San Diego	7	–	9	.438	13	–	18	.419
Pepperdine	4	–	12	.250	10	–	19	.345
Portland	3	–	13	.188	7	–	24	.226
Santa Clara	0	–	16	.000	8	–	22	.267
† Conference tournament winner Rankings from AP poll

The 2011–12 Gonzaga Bulldogs men's basketball team represented Gonzaga University in the 2011–12 NCAA Division I men's basketball season. The Bulldogs (also informally referred to as the "Zags"), members of the West Coast Conference, were led by head coach Mark Few, in his 13th season at the school. The Zags played most of their home games at the McCarthey Athletic Center on the university campus in Spokane, Washington, but played one home game at Spokane Arena, located in downtown Spokane about 2 miles (3 km) from the Gonzaga campus. The team also played one game at KeyArena in Seattle, a contest billed as the "Battle in Seattle". This season, the Zags also played a game against Hawaiʻi at Rogers Arena in Vancouver, BC. It was something of a homecoming for center Robert Sacre who is from North Vancouver. The Zags had three Canadians on this year's roster, one of whom (Kelly Olynyk) was redshirted and did not play in 2011–12.

They finished the season 26–7, 13–3 in WCC play to finish in second place. They lost in the championship game of the West Coast Basketball tournament to Saint Mary's. They received an at-large bid to the 2012 NCAA tournament, their 14th straight tournament bid, where they defeated West Virginia in the second round before falling in the third round to Ohio State.

== Preseason ==
In 2011–12, the Gonzaga Bulldogs men's basketball team were in their 32nd season as a member of the West Coast Conference. Since 2004, the team has played their home games at the McCarthey Athletic Center, which has a capacity of 6,000.

=== Departures ===
Name	Number	Pos.	Height	Weight	Year	Hometown	Reason for departure
Steven Gray	41	G	6'5"	205	Senior	Irondale, WA	Graduated
Demetri Goodson	3	G	6'0"	173	Junior	Spring, TX	Transferred to Baylor (Football)
Mangisto Arop	2	G	6'6"	208	Sophomore	Edmonton, AB	Transferred to Indiana State
Keegan Hyland	33	G	6'4"	192	Freshman	Portland, ME	Transferred to Fairfield

=== Incoming transfers ===
Name	Pos.	Height	Weight	Year	Hometown	Previous School	Years Remaining	Date Eligible
Guy Landry Edi	F	6'6"	218	Junior	Agboville, Côte d'Ivoire	Midland College	1.5	Dec. 17, 2011

=== 2011 recruiting class ===
College recruiting
Name	Hometown	School	Height	Weight	Commit date
Gary Bell Jr. PG	Kent, WA	Kentridge	6 ft 2 in (1.88 m)	185 lb (84 kg)	Apr 26, 2010
Gary Bell Jr. PG	Recruit ratings: Scout: Rivals: 247Sports: ESPN: (94)				
Kyle Dranginis; PG	Nampa, ID	Skyview	6 ft 4 in (1.93 m)	165 lb (75 kg)	May 24, 2010
Kyle Dranginis; PG	Recruit ratings: Scout: Rivals: 247Sports: ESPN: (89)				
Ryan Spangler; PF	Blanchard, OK	Bridge Creek	6 ft 7 in (2.01 m)	220 lb (100 kg)	Sep 24, 2010
Ryan Spangler; PF	Recruit ratings: Scout: Rivals: 247Sports: ESPN: (89)				
Kevin Pangos; PG	Newmarket, ON	Denison Secondary School	6 ft 1 in (1.85 m)	180 lb (82 kg)	Oct 5, 2010
Kevin Pangos; PG	Recruit ratings: Scout: Rivals: 247Sports: ESPN: (92)				
Chris Sarbaugh; PG	Spokane, WA	Gonzaga Prep	6 ft 3 in (1.91 m)	195 lb (88 kg)	
Chris Sarbaugh; PG	Recruit ratings: Scout: Rivals: 247Sports: ESPN: (NR)				
Overall recruit ranking: Scout: NR Rivals: NR 247Sports: NR ESPN: NR
Note: In many cases, Scout, Rivals, 247Sports, On3, and ESPN may conflict in their listings of height and weight.; In these cases, the average was taken. ESPN grades are on a 100-point scale.; Sources: "2011 Gonzaga Rivals Commits". Rivals.; "2011 Gonzaga Scout Commits". Scout.; "2011 Gonzaga ESPN Commits". ESPN.; "Scout.com Team Recruiting Rankings". Scout.; "2011 Team Ranking". Rivals.; "2011 Gonzaga 24/7 Sports Commits". 247Sports.

== Roster ==
2011–12 Gonzaga Bulldogs men's basketball team
Players
Coaches

Pos.	#	Name	Height	Weight	Year	Previous school	Hometown
C	00	Robert Sacre	7 ft 0 in (2.13 m)	260 lb (118 kg)	RS Sr	Handsworth	North Vancouver, BC
G	2	Marquise Carter	6 ft 4 in (1.93 m)	178 lb (81 kg)	RS Sr	Horizon Christian; Three Rivers CC	San Diego, CA
G	30	Mike Hart (W)	6 ft 6 in (1.98 m)	206 lb (93 kg)	RS Jr	Jesuit	Portland, OR
F	20	Elias Harris	6 ft 7 in (2.01 m)	245 lb (111 kg)	Jr	Friedrich-Magnus-Schwerd-Gymnasium; BIS Speyer	Speyer, Germany
F	13	Kelly Olynyk (redshirt)	7 ft 0 in (2.13 m)	238 lb (108 kg)	Jr	South Kamloops	Kamloops, BC
F	10	Guy Landry Edi	6 ft 6 in (1.98 m)	218 lb (99 kg)	Jr	Stoneridge Prep (CA); Midland College	Agboville, Côte d'Ivoire
C	35	Sam Dower	6 ft 9 in (2.06 m)	248 lb (112 kg)	RS So	Osseo	Brooklyn Park, MN
G	11	David Stockton	5 ft 11 in (1.8 m)	152 lb (69 kg)	RS So	Gonzaga Prep	Spokane, WA
G	25	Mathis Keita	6 ft 5 in (1.96 m)	190 lb (86 kg)	So	Lycée Marcelin Berthelot; INSEP	Thionville, France
F	22	Mathis Mönninghoff	6 ft 7 in (2.01 m)	189 lb (86 kg)	So	Landrat-Lucas-Gymnasium; Bayer Giants	Ibbenbüren, Germany
G	5	Gary Bell Jr.	6 ft 1 in (1.85 m)	205 lb (93 kg)	Fr	Kentridge	Kent, WA
F	15	Ryan Spangler	6 ft 8 in (2.03 m)	232 lb (105 kg)	Fr	Bridge Creek	Blanchard, OK
G	4	Kevin Pangos	6 ft 1 in (1.85 m)	180 lb (82 kg)	Fr	Denison Secondary	Newmarket, ON
G	3	Kyle Dranginis (redshirt)	6 ft 5 in (1.96 m)	175 lb (79 kg)	Fr	Skyview	Nampa, ID
G	14	Chris Sarbaugh (W) (redshirt)	6 ft 3 in (1.91 m)	195 lb (88 kg)	Fr	Gonzaga Prep	Spokane, WA

Head coach

- Mark Few (Oregon)

Assistant coach(es)

- Tommy Lloyd (Whitman)
- Ray Giacoletti (Minot State)
- Donny Daniels (Cal State Fullerton)

Legend

- (C) Team captain
- (S) Suspended
- (I) Ineligible
- (W) Walk-on
- Injured
- Current redshirt

Roster

== Schedule ==
Date time, TV	Rank^{#}	Opponent^{#}	Result	Record	Site (attendance) city, state
Exhibition
October 28, 2011*; 6:00 pm, KHQ	No. 23	Carroll	W 95–51		McCarthey Athletic Center (6,000); Spokane, WA
November 5, 2011*	No. 23	vs. Texas; Secret Scrimmage	W –	-	Pepsi Center (-); Denver, CO
Regular Season
November 11, 2011*; 8:00 pm, SWX/ROOT	No. 23	Eastern Washington	W 77–69	1–0	McCarthey Athletic Center (6,000); Spokane, WA
November 14, 2011*; 9:00 pm, ESPN	No. 22	Washington State	W 89–81	2–0	McCarthey Athletic Center (6,000); Spokane, WA
November 19, 2011*; 6:00 pm, KHQ/ROOT	No. 22	vs. Hawaii; BC Basketball Classic	W 73–54	3–0	Rogers Arena (9,687); Vancouver, BC
November 26, 2011*; 1:00 pm, KHQ/ROOT	No. 19	vs. Western Michigan; Ronald McDonald House Charities Classic	W 78–58	4–0	Spokane Arena (9,610); Spokane, WA
November 30, 2011*; 8:15 pm, ESPN2	No. 19	Notre Dame	W 73–53	5–0	McCarthey Athletic Center (6,000); Spokane, WA
December 3, 2011*; 12:15 pm, ESPN2	No. 19	at Illinois	L 75–82	5–1	Assembly Hall (15,879); Champaign, IL
December 10, 2011*; 6:00 pm, ESPN2	No. 23	Michigan State	L 67–74	5–2	McCarthey Athletic Center (6,000); Spokane, WA
December 15, 2011*; 6:00 pm, KHQ/ROOT		Oral Roberts			McCarthey Athletic Center (6,000); Spokane, WA
December 17, 2011*; 1:00 pm, CBS		vs. Arizona; Battle in Seattle	W 71–60	7–2	KeyArena (15,127); Seattle, WA
December 20, 2011*; 6:00 pm, ESPN2		Butler	W 71–55	8–2	McCarthey Athletic Center (6,000); Spokane, WA
December 22, 2011*; 6:00 pm, KHQ/ROOT		Air Force	W 70–60	9–2	McCarthey Athletic Center (6,000); Spokane, WA
December 28, 2011; 6:00 pm, KHQ/ROOT		Portland	W 90–51	10–2 (1–0)	McCarthey Athletic Center (6,000); Spokane, WA
December 31, 2011*; 5:00 pm, ESPN2		at Xavier	W 72–65	11–2	Cintas Center (10,250); Cincinnati, OH
January 5, 2012; 6:00 pm, KHQ/ROOT	No. 25	Pepperdine	W 73–45	12–2 (2–0)	McCarthey Athletic Center (6,000); Spokane, WA
January 7, 2012; 5:00 pm, KAYU/ROOT	No. 25	Santa Clara	W 82–60	13–2 (3–0)	McCarthey Athletic Center (6,000); Spokane, WA
January 12, 2012; 8:00 pm, ESPN2	No. 21	at Saint Mary's	L 62–83	13–3 (3–1)	McKeon Pavilion (3,500); Moraga, CA
January 14, 2012; 5:00 pm, KHQ/ROOT	No. 21	at Loyola Marymount	W 62–58	14–3 (4–1)	Gersten Pavilion (3,942); Los Angeles, CA
January 19, 2012; 6:00 pm, ESPNU		San Francisco	W 74–63	15–3 (5–1)	McCarthey Athletic Center (6,000); Spokane, WA
January 21, 2012; 5:00 pm, KHQ/ROOT		San Diego	W 77–60	16–3 (6–1)	McCarthey Athletic Center (6,000); Spokane, WA
January 26, 2012; 8:00 pm, ESPN2		at Portland	W 74–62	17–3 (7–1)	Chiles Center (4,852); Portland, OR
February 2, 2012; 7:00 pm, ESPN2	No. 24	at BYU	L 73–83	17–4 (7–2)	Marriott Center (19,257); Provo, UT
February 4, 2012; 7:00 pm, KHQ/ROOT	No. 24	at Pepperdine	W 72–60	18–4 (8–2)	Firestone Fieldhouse (2,120); Malibu, CA
February 9, 2012; 8:00 pm, ESPN2		No. 16 Saint Mary's	W 73–59	19–4 (9–2)	McCarthey Athletic Center (6,000); Spokane, WA
February 11, 2012; 5:00 pm, KHQ/ROOT		Loyola Marymount	W 78–59	20–4 (10–2)	McCarthey Athletic Center (6,000); Spokane, WA
February 16, 2012; 8:00 pm, ESPN2	No. 24	at Santa Clara	W 73–62	21–4 (11–2)	Leavey Center (4,700); Santa Clara, CA
February 18, 2012; 5:00 pm, KHQ/ROOT	No. 24	at San Francisco	L 65–66	21–5 (11–3)	War Memorial Gymnasium (4,500); San Francisco, CA
February 23, 2012; 8:00 pm, ESPN2		BYU	W 74–63	22–5 (12–3)	McCarthey Athletic Center (6,000); Spokane, WA
February 25, 2012; 4:00 pm, KHQ/ROOT		at San Diego	W 65–57	23–5 (13–3)	Jenny Craig Pavilion (3,962); San Diego, CA
February 27, 2012*; 6:00 pm, KHQ/ROOT		Longwood	W 92–60	24–5	McCarthey Athletic Center (6,000); Spokane, WA
2012 West Coast Conference men's basketball tournament
March 3, 2012; 8:30 pm, ESPN2		vs. BYU; Semifinals	W 77–58	25–5	Orleans Arena (7,828); Paradise, NV
March 5, 2012; 6:00 pm, ESPN	No. 24	vs. Saint Mary's; Championship Game	L 74–78 ^{OT}	25–6	Orleans Arena (6,826); Paradise, NV
2012 NCAA tournament
March 15, 2012*; 4:20 pm, TNT	No. (7)	vs. (10) West Virginia; Second Round	W 77–54	26–6	Consol Energy Center (19,413); Pittsburgh, PA
March 17, 2012*; 11:45 am, CBS	No. (7)	vs. No. 7 (2) Ohio State; Third Round	L 66–73	26–7	Consol Energy Center (18,588); Pittsburgh, PA
*Non-conference game. ^{#}Rankings from AP Poll. (#) Tournament seedings in parentheses. All times are in Pacific Time (#) during NCAA Tournament is seed with Region.
