= 2011–12 San Diego Toreros men's basketball team =

American college basketball season

2011–12 San Diego Toreros men's basketball
- Conference: West Coast Conference
- Record: 13–18 (7–9 WCC)
- Head coach: Bill Grier (5th season)
- Assistant coaches: Mike Burns; Rodney Tention; Kyle Bankhead
- Home arena: Jenny Craig Pavilion

2011–12 West Coast Conference men's basketball standings
	Conf.				Overall
Team	W		L	PCT	W		L	PCT
No. 24 Saint Mary's†	14	–	2	.875	27	–	6	.818
Gonzaga	13	–	3	.813	26	–	7	.788
BYU	12	–	4	.750	26	–	9	.743
Loyola Marymount	11	–	5	.688	21	–	13	.618
San Francisco	8	–	8	.500	20	–	14	.588
San Diego	7	–	9	.438	13	–	18	.419
Pepperdine	4	–	12	.250	10	–	19	.345
Portland	3	–	13	.188	7	–	24	.226
Santa Clara	0	–	16	.000	8	–	22	.267
† Conference tournament winner Rankings from AP poll

The 2011–12 San Diego Toreros men's basketball team represented the University of San Diego in the 2011–12 NCAA Division I men's basketball season. This was head coach Bill Grier's fifth season at San Diego. The Toreros competed in the West Coast Conference and played their home games at the Jenny Craig Pavilion. They finished the season 13–8, 7–9 in WCC play to finish in sixth place and lost in the quarterfinals of the West Coast Conference tournament to BYU.

== Roster ==
#	Name	Height	Weight (lbs.)	Position	Class	Hometown	Previous Team(s)
0	Christopher Anderson	5'8"	150	G	Freshman	Anaheim Hills, CA	Canyon HS
1	Johnny Dee	6'0"	175	G	Freshman	Vista, CA	Rancho Buena Vista HS
3	Darian Norris	6'0"	180	G	Senior	Las Vegas, NV	Mojave HS/Salt Lake CC
4	Nick Kerr	6'3"	175	G	Freshman	San Diego, CA	Torrey Pines HS
13	Keith Stackhouse	6'2"	185	G	Freshman	Bellingham, WA	Squalicum HS
14	Ben Vozzola	6'5"	180	G	RS Freshman	Las Vegas, NV	Centennial HS
20	Cameron Miles	6'1"	175	G	Junior	Dallas, TX	Skyline HS
24	Blair Banker	6'8"	220	F	RS Freshman	West Lafayette, IN	Harrison HS
25	Simi Fajemisin	6'9"	265	F/C	RS Freshman	Lynnwood, WA	Lynnwood HS
31	John Sinis	6'8"	225	G/F	RS Freshman	Patras, Greece	Greece National Team
32	Ken Rancifer	6'5"	215	F	Junior	Oakland, CA	El Cerrito HS
34	Chris Manresa	6'8"	240	F	Junior	Rancho Santa Margarita, CA	Tesoro HS
40	Dennis Kramer	6'10"	235	F	Sophomore	Encinitas, CA	La Costa HS

== Schedule and results ==
- All times are Pacific

Date time, TV	Rank^{#}	Opponent^{#}	Result	Record	Site (attendance) city, state
Regular season
November 14, 2011*; 7:00 pm		Stephen F. Austin	W 66–61	1–0	Jenny Craig Pavilion (2,023); San Diego, CA
November 16, 2011*; 7:00 pm		San Diego Christian	W 89–63	2–0	Jenny Craig Pavilion (1,205); San Diego, CA
November 20, 2011*; 5:00 pm		Montana	L 60–73	2–1	Jenny Craig Pavilion (1,659); San Diego, CA
November 25, 2011*; 2:30 pm		vs. New Orleans; Hoops for Hope Classic	W 64–56	3–1	Fogelman Arena (N/A); New Orleans, LA
November 26, 2011*; 2:30 pm		vs. Alcorn State; Hoops for Hope Classic	W 66–65	4–1	Fogelman Arena (N/A); New Orleans, LA
November 27, 2011*; 4:00 pm		at Tulane; Hoops for Hope Classic	L 46–65	4–2	New Orleans Arena (1,967); New Orleans, LA
December 3, 2011*; 7:00 pm		at UC Irvine	L 78–99	4–3	Bren Events Center (1,186); Irvine, CA
December 7, 2011*; 7:00 pm, 4SD		San Diego State; City Championship	L 62–74	4–4	Jenny Craig Pavilion (4,708); San Diego, CA
December 10, 2011*; 6:00 pm		Maine	W 77–63	5–4	Jenny Craig Pavilion (1,503); San Diego, CA
December 13, 2011*; 6:00 pm		UC Santa Barbara	L 61–65	5–5	Jenny Craig Pavilion (1,720); San Diego, CA
December 17, 2011*; 5:00 pm		at Stanford	L 55–75	5–6	Maples Pavilion (4,761); Stanford, CA
December 22, 2011*; 2:00 pm		vs. South Alabama	L 62–68	5–7	South Point Casino (500); Enterprise, NV
December 31, 2011; 3:00 pm, 4SD		at BYU	L 52–88	5–8 (0–1)	Marriott Center (16,369); Provo, UT
January 5, 2012; 6:00 pm, ESPNU		Saint Mary's	L 72–78	5–9 (0–2)	Jenny Craig Pavilion (3,317); San Diego, CA
January 7, 2012; 6:00 pm		Loyola Marymount	L 68–79	5–10 (0–3)	Jenny Craig Pavilion (2,188); San Diego, CA
January 12, 2012; 7:00 pm		at Santa Clara	W 75–62	6–10 (1–3)	Leavey Center (2,032); Santa Clara, CA
January 16, 2012; 7:00 pm, 4SD		BYU	L 63–82	6–11 (1–4)	Jenny Craig Pavilion (3,204); San Diego, CA
January 19, 2012; 7:00 pm, 4SD		at Portland	W 82–63	7–11 (2–4)	Chiles Center (1,890); Portland, OR
January 21, 2012; 5:00 pm, RTNW		at Gonzaga	L 60–77	7–12 (2–5)	McCarthey Athletic Center (6,000); Spokane, WA
January 26, 2012; 7:00 pm		Pepperdine	W 65–56	8–12 (3–5)	Jenny Craig Pavilion (1,830); San Diego, CA
January 28, 2012; 7:00 pm, 4SD		at San Francisco	L 70–84	8–13 (3–6)	War Memorial Gymnasium (3,075); San Francisco, CA
February 2, 2012; 7:00 pm		at Saint Mary's	L 73–84	8–14 (3–7)	McKeon Pavilion (3,500); Moraga, CA
February 4, 2012; 4:00 pm, 4SD		Santa Clara	W 70–65	9–14 (4–7)	Jenny Craig Pavilion (2,905); San Diego, CA
February 9, 2012; 7:00 pm		at Pepperdine	W 70–57	10–14 (5–7)	Firestone Fieldhouse (747); Malibu, CA
February 11, 2012; 6:00 pm, 4SD		San Francisco	L 70–81	10–15 (5–8)	Jenny Craig Pavilion (2,883); San Diego, CA
February 16, 2012; 5:30 pm, 4SD		Portland	W 78–75 ^{OT}	11–15 (6–8)	Jenny Craig Pavilion (1,835); San Diego, CA
February 18, 2012*; 7:00 pm		at Cal State Bakersfield	L 63–72	11–16	Rabobank Arena (2,305); Bakersfield, CA
February 23, 2012; 7:00 pm		at Loyola Marymount	W 60–57	12–16 (7–8)	Gersten Pavilion (1,860); Los Angeles, CA
February 25, 2012; 4:00 pm, 4SD		Gonzaga	L 57–65	12–17 (7–9)	Jenny Craig Pavilion (3,962); San Diego, CA
2012 West Coast Conference men's basketball tournament
March 1, 2012; 8:30 pm, BYUtv		vs. Pepperdine; Second Round	W 76–54	13–17	Orleans Arena (1,919); Paradise, NV
March 1, 2012; 8:30 pm, ESPNU		vs. BYU; Quarterfinals	L 68–73	13–18	Orleans Arena (5,037); Paradise, NV
*Non-conference game. ^{#}Rankings from AP Poll. (#) Tournament seedings in parentheses.

=== Player Dismissals ===
On November 10, head coach Bill Grier announced that junior center Chris Gabriel and sophomore guard Jordan Mackie were dismissed from the team for the year. Reasons for their dismissal weren't announced.
