= 2011–12 Loyola Marymount Lions men's basketball team =

American college basketball season

2011–12 Loyola Marymount Lions men's basketball

CIT, Third Round
- Conference: West Coast Conference
- Record: 21–13 (11–5 WCC)
- Head coach: Max Good (4th season)
- Assistant coaches: Myke Scholl; Jason Levy; Chris Farr
- Home arena: Gersten Pavilion

2011–12 West Coast Conference men's basketball standings
	Conf.				Overall
Team	W		L	PCT	W		L	PCT
No. 24 Saint Mary's†	14	–	2	.875	27	–	6	.818
Gonzaga	13	–	3	.813	26	–	7	.788
BYU	12	–	4	.750	26	–	9	.743
Loyola Marymount	11	–	5	.688	21	–	13	.618
San Francisco	8	–	8	.500	20	–	14	.588
San Diego	7	–	9	.438	13	–	18	.419
Pepperdine	4	–	12	.250	10	–	19	.345
Portland	3	–	13	.188	7	–	24	.226
Santa Clara	0	–	16	.000	8	–	22	.267
† Conference tournament winner Rankings from AP poll

The 2011–12 Loyola Marymount Lions men's basketball team represented Loyola Marymount University in the 2011–12 college basketball season. This was head coach Max Good's fourth season at Loyola Marymount. The Lions played their home games at the Gersten Pavilion and were members of the West Coast Conference. The Lions have accepted an invitation to participate in the 2012 CollegeInsider.com Tournament.

== Roster ==
2011–12 Loyola Marymount Lions men's basketball team
Players
Coaches

Pos.	#	Name	Height	Weight	Year	Previous school	Hometown
G	1	Bruce English	6 ft 1 in (1.85 m)	190 lb (86 kg)	Fr	Lutheran	La Verne, CA
F	2	C. J. Blackwell	6 ft 5 in (1.96 m)	240 lb (109 kg)	Fr	Taft	Los Angeles, CA
G	3	Anthony Ireland	5 ft 10 in (1.78 m)	170 lb (77 kg)	So	Winchedon School	Waterbury, CT
G	4	Jarred DuBois	6 ft 3 in (1.91 m)	180 lb (82 kg)	RS Jr	Westchester	Los Angeles, CA
F	5	Ashley Hamilton	6 ft 7 in (2.01 m)	210 lb (95 kg)	RS Jr	Lawrence Academy	London, England
G	10	Taylor Walker	6 ft 1 in (1.85 m)	180 lb (82 kg)	RS Jr	Fullerton JC	Inglewood, CA
F	12	LaRon Armstead	6 ft 5 in (1.96 m)	200 lb (91 kg)	Sr	Fremont	Los Angeles, CA
G	13	Daniel Latimer	6 ft 0 in (1.83 m)	170 lb (77 kg)	RS Jr	Windward	Pori, Finland
F	15	Alex Osborne	6 ft 7 in (2.01 m)	240 lb (109 kg)	RS So	Pacific Hills	Los Angeles, CA
F	20	Quincy Lawson	6 ft 6 in (1.98 m)	200 lb (91 kg)	RS So	Vista	San Diego, CA
F	21	Edgar Garibay (R)	6 ft 10 in (2.08 m)	250 lb (113 kg)	RS So	Compton	Compton, CA
F	22	Godwin Okonji	6 ft 8 in (2.03 m)	220 lb (100 kg)	Sr	Findlay College Prep	Lagos, Nigeria
G	23	Kelsey Chine	6 ft 5 in (1.96 m)	190 lb (86 kg)	Sr	El Camino College	Los Angeles, CA
F	24	Ayodeji Egbeyemi	6 ft 4 in (1.93 m)	205 lb (93 kg)	So	National Christian Academy	Fort Washington, MD
F	32	Tim Diederichs	6 ft 9 in (2.06 m)	225 lb (102 kg)	RS Sr	Snohomish	Seattle, WA
F	34	Drew Viney	6 ft 8 in (2.03 m)	210 lb (95 kg)	RS Sr	Oregon	Villa Park, CA

Head coach

- Max Good (Eastern Kentucky)

Assistant coach(es)

- Myke Scholl (Maryland)
- Jason Levy (Cal State Northridge)
- Chris Farr (Cal State East Bay)

Legend

- (C) Team captain
- (S) Suspended
- (I) Ineligible
- (W) Walk-on
- (R) Released from team
- Injured
- Current redshirt

== Schedule and results ==
Date time, TV	Rank^{#}	Opponent^{#}	Result	Record	Site (attendance) city, state
Exhibition
11/01/2011*; 7:00pm, Prime Ticket		La Verne	W 94–49	-	Gersten Pavilion (1,492); Los Angeles, CA
Regular Season
11/11/2011*; 7:30pm, FS West		at No. 17 UCLA	W 69–58	1–0	LA Sports Arena (5,382); Los Angeles, CA
11/13/2011*; 3:00pm		Middle Tennessee State	L 51–58	1–1	Gersten Pavilion (1,853); Los Angeles, CA
11/19/2011*; 6:30pm		Harvard	L 67–77	1–2	Gersten Pavilion (3,313); Los Angeles, CA
11/23/2011*; 6:05pm		at Idaho State	W 79–76 ^{OT}	2–2	Reed Gym (1,740); Pocatello, ID
11/26/2011*; 7:30pm		Northern Arizona	W 81–61	3–2	Gersten Pavilion (1,565); Los Angeles, CA
11/29/2011*; 7:00pm		No. 23 St. Louis	W 75–68	4–2	Gersten Pavilion (2,012); Los Angeles, CA
12/02/2011*; 7:00pm		Columbia; Doubletree Los Angeles Westwide Centennial Classic	L 61–69	4–3	Gersten Pavilion (3,844); Los Angeles, CA
12/03/2011*; 7:30pm		La Sierra; Doubletree Los Angeles Westside Centennial Classic	W 87–45	5–3	Gersten Pavilion (2,195); Los Angeles, CA
12/04/2011*; 1:30pm		North Texas; Doubletree Los Angeles Westside Centennial Classic	L 63–76	5–4	Gersten Pavilion (1,913); Los Angeles, CA
12/10/2011*; 7:00pm		Idaho State	W 80–72 ^{OT}	6–4	Gersten Pavilion (2,176); Los Angeles, CA
12/18/2011*; 12:00pm, ESPNU		at Florida State	L 61–77	6–5	Donald L. Tucker Center (5,642); Tallahassee, FL
12/21/2011*; 4:00pm		at Morgan State	L 45–69	6–6	Talmadge L. Hill Field House (326); Baltimore, MD
12/27/2011*; 6:00pm		Vanguard	W 100–74	7–6	Gersten Pavilion (1,978); Los Angeles, CA
12/31/2011; 5:00pm		at San Francisco	W 77–76 ^{OT}	8–6 (1–0)	War Memorial Gymnasium (1,460); San Francisco, CA
01/05/2012; 6:00pm, Prime Ticket		BYU	L 65–73	8–7 (1–1)	Gersten Pavilion (3,073); Los Angeles, CA
01/07/2012; 6:00pm		at San Diego	W 79–68	9–7 (2–1)	Jenny Craig Pavilion (2,188); San Diego, CA
01/12/2012; 7:00pm, ESPNU		at Pepperdine	W 68–58	10–7 (3–1)	Firestone Fieldhouse (1,582); Malibu, CA
01/14/2012; 5:00pm, ROOT		at No. 21 Gonzaga	L 58–62	10–8 (3–2)	Gersten Pavilion (3,942); Los Angeles, CA
01/19/2012; 6:00pm, Prime Ticket		at BYU	W 82–68	11–8 (4–2)	Marriott Center (12,751); Provo, UT
01/23/2012; 7:00pm		at Santa Clara	W 74–62	12–8 (5–2)	Leavey Center (1,810); Santa Clara, CA
01/26/2012; 7:00pm		No. 21 Saint Mary's	L 64–71	12–9 (5–3)	Gersten Pavilion (2,243); Los Angeles, CA
01/28/2012; 7:00pm, FS West		Portland	W 62–59	13–9 (6–3)	Gersten Pavilion (2,988); Los Angeles, CA
02/02/2012; 7:30pm, Prime Ticket		Pepperdine	W 67–57	14–9 (7–3)	Gersten Pavilion (3,016); Los Angeles, CA
02/04/2012; 7:00pm		San Francisco	W 90–88	15–9 (8–3)	Gersten Pavilion (2,409); Los Angeles, CA
02/09/2012; 8:00pm, Prime Ticket (TD)		at Portland	W 76–62	16–9 (9–3)	Chiles Center (2,067); Portland, OR
02/11/2012; 5:00pm, ROOT		at Gonzaga	L 59–78	16–10 (9–4)	McCarthey Athletic Center (6,000); Spokane, WA
02/15/2012; 7:30pm, Prime Ticket (TD)		at No. 21 Saint Mary's	W 75–60	17–10 (10–4)	McKeon Pavilion (3,500); Moraga, CA
02/18/2012*; 6:00pm, ESPNU		Valparaiso; Sears BracketBusters	W 61–53	18–10	Gersten Pavilion (4,021); Los Angeles, CA
02/23/2012; 7:00pm		San Diego	L 57–60	18–11 (10–5)	Gersten Pavilion (1,860); Los Angeles, CA
02/25/2012; 8:00pm, FS West		Santa Clara	W 68–65	19–11 (11–5)	Gersten Pavilion (2,743); Los Angeles, CA
2012 West Coast Conference men's basketball tournament
03/02/2012; 6:00pm, ESPNU		vs. San Francisco; Quarterfinals	L 60–67	19–12	Orleans Arena (5,037); Paradise, NV
2012 CollegeInsider.com Postseason Tournament
03/14/2012*; 7:00pm		Cal State Fullerton; First Round	W 88–79	20–12	Gersten Pavilion (1,161); Los Angeles, CA
03/18/2012*; 3:00pm		Weber State; Second Round	W 84–78 ^{OT}	21–12	Gersten Pavilion (1,292); Los Angeles, CA
03/21/2012*; 6:00pm		at Utah State; Quarterfinals	L 69–77	21–13	Smith Spectrum (3,546); Logan, UT
*Non-conference game. ^{#}Rankings from AP Poll. (#) Tournament seedings in parentheses.
