= Ryan Spangler =

American basketball player (born 1991)

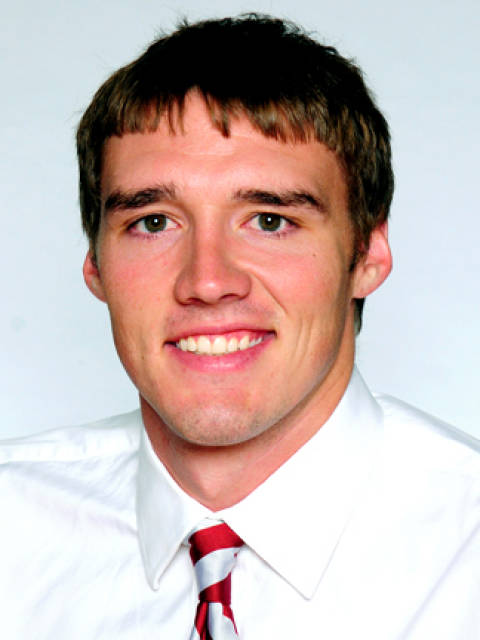

Personal information
- Born: October 3, 1991 (age 35) Ardmore, Oklahoma
- Listed height: 6 ft 8 in (2.03 m)
- Listed weight: 232 lb (105 kg)

Career information
- High school: Bridge Creek (Bridge Creek, Oklahoma)
- College: Gonzaga (2011–2012); Oklahoma (2013–2016)
- NBA draft: 2016: undrafted
- Playing career: 2016–2017
- Position: Power forward / center

Career history
- 2016–2017: Toshiba Kawasaki Brave Thunders

Career highlights
- Third-team All-Big 12 (2016); Gatorade Oklahoma Player of the Year (2011); Fourth-team Parade All-American (2011)

Ryan Blaine Spangler (born October 3, 1991) is an American former basketball player. He played college basketball for Gonzaga and the University of Oklahoma.

== Early life ==
Spangler was born in Ardmore, Oklahoma, He is the son of former NFL player Larry Spangler and LeAnn Spangler. He has two older brothers, Robert Spangler and Rustin Spangler.

== High school career ==
Spangler excelled in football and basketball in high school. He was named Gatorade Oklahoma Player of the Year and fourth-team Parade All-American as a senior.

As a senior, he averaged 29.2 points, 17.2 rebounds, and 4.3 assists, while shooting .714 from the field (312-for-437) and .720 from free throw line (180-for-250). He led Class 4A in scoring, rebounding and field goal percentage and was State Runner-Up. As a junior, he averaged 26.4 points and 18.2 rebounds to lead Class 3A. Shooting .673 from field and added 3.5 assists. As a sophomore, he averaged 24.2 points and 15.2 rebounds, ranking second and first, respectively, in Class 3A. As a freshman, he averaged 13.9 points and 7.8 rebounds. Spangler finished career with 2,513 points (23.7 average), 1,564 rebounds (14.8) and 313 assists (3.0) while shooting .670 from the field.

He started as quarterback for three years and finished his career with 6,951 passing yards, 71 touchdowns, and 20 interceptions while completing 466-of-778 passes (.599). He also averaged 37.8 yards per punt as a senior.

== College career ==
Spangler received offers from several NCAA Division I schools including Gonzaga, TCU, Tulsa, and Colorado.

=== Gonzaga ===
Spangler played his freshman year at Gonzaga before using his redshirt year and transferring closer to home to play at Oklahoma.

He averaged 2.5 points and 2.4 rebounds in 6.6 minutes per game for the 26–7 Bulldogs. Shot .561 from the field in only 22 outings. Spangler led the team in rebounds per minute (0.36). He had pins placed in little finger of left hand Jan 17 and missed five games. Recorded season highs of 12 points and 10 rebounds in 21 minutes against Longwood on Feb. 27. He contributed four points and team-high eight rebounds in second-round NCAA Tournament win over West Virginia (played 21 minutes).

=== Oklahoma ===
After using his redshirt year and sitting out the 2012–13 season due to NCAA transfer rules, Spangler made his first college start on November 8, 2013, against Alabama, where he recorded his first double-double of the season with 15 points and 12 rebounds.

=== College career statistics ===
Cited from SoonerSports.com

College	Year	GP-GS	FG-A	FG%	3FG-A	3FG%	FT-A	FT%	REB	RPG	AST	TO	BLK	STL	PTS	PPG
Gonzaga	2011–12	20–0	23–41	.561	0–0	.000	10–23	.435	52	2.4	4	6	1	2	56	2.5
Oklahoma	2013–14	33–33	115–197	.584	3–11	.273	83–121	.686	307	9.3	45	39	31	18	316	9.6
Oklahoma	2014–15	35–35	136–234	.581	10–33	.303	57–79	.722	288	8.2	46	46	38	24	339	9.7
Oklahoma	2015–16	37–37	146–267	.547	32–88	.364	52–87	.598	334	9.0	76	62	20	16	376	10.2

== Professional career ==
After going undrafted in the 2016 NBA draft, Spangler played two games in the 2016 NBA Summer League with the Oklahoma City Thunder before moving to Japan to play for the Toshiba Kawasaki Brave Thunders.

=== Professional career statistics ===
Cited from RealGM.com

Team	Year	GP-GS	FGM-FGA	FG%	3FG-A	3FG%	FT-A	FT%	REB	RPG	AST	TO	BLK	STL	PTS	PPG
Toshiba Kawasaki Brave Thunders	2016–17	45–43	229–345	.664	8–26	.308	93–153	.608	376	8.4	84	58	42	23	559	12.42
