= 2011–12 Portland Pilots men's basketball team =

American college basketball season

2011–12 Portland Pilots men's basketball
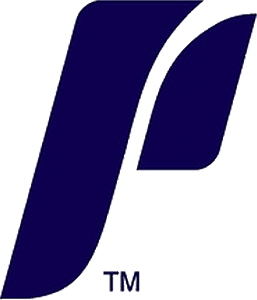
- Conference: West Coast Conference
- Record: 7–24 (3–13 WCC)
- Head coach: Eric Reveno (6th season)
- Assistant coaches: Joel Sobotka; Eric Jackson; Michael Wolf
- Home arena: Chiles Center

2011–12 West Coast Conference men's basketball standings
	Conf.				Overall
Team	W		L	PCT	W		L	PCT
No. 24 Saint Mary's†	14	–	2	.875	27	–	6	.818
Gonzaga	13	–	3	.813	26	–	7	.788
BYU	12	–	4	.750	26	–	9	.743
Loyola Marymount	11	–	5	.688	21	–	13	.618
San Francisco	8	–	8	.500	20	–	14	.588
San Diego	7	–	9	.438	13	–	18	.419
Pepperdine	4	–	12	.250	10	–	19	.345
Portland	3	–	13	.188	7	–	24	.226
Santa Clara	0	–	16	.000	8	–	22	.267
† Conference tournament winner Rankings from AP poll

The 2011–12 Portland Pilots men's basketball team represented the University of Portland in the 2011–12 NCAA Division I men's basketball season. The Pilots, members of the West Coast Conference, were led by sixth-year head coach Eric Reveno. They played their home games at the Chiles Center. They finished the season 7–24, 3–13 in WCC play to finish in eighth place and lost in the second round of the West Coast Conference tournament to San Francisco.

== Departures ==
The Portland Pilots lost Luke Sikma and Jared Stohl because they both graduated from the University of Portland. They were both averaging over 10 points per game.

== Roster ==
Name	Number	Pos.	Height	Weight	Year	Hometown	High School/Last College
Kevin Bailey	00	G	6' 5"	190	Freshman	Clovis, California	Corvis East HS
Eric Waterford	1	G	6' 1"	180	Senior	Modesto, California	St. Thomas More School
Tanner Riley	3	G	6' 3"	200	Sophomore	North Bend, Washington	Mount Si HS
John Bailey	5	F	6' 8"	210	RS Freshman	Mesa, Arizona	Dobson HS
Taylor Mossman	10	G	6' 2"	185	Sophomore	Anaheim, California	Findlay Prep
Tim Douglas	11	G	5' 10"	160	Sophomore	Cerritos, California	Mayfair HS
Thomas van der Mars	12	C	6' 11"	225	Freshman	Gouda, Netherlands	Eramsus
Riley Barker	14	C	6' 10"	225	Sophomore	Surrey, British Columbia	White Rock Christian Academy
Derrick Rodgers	15	G	6' 1"	210	Junior	Rancho Cucamonga, California	Citrus College
Korey Thieleke	21	G	6' 3"	170	Sophomore	Bakersfield, California	West HS
Dorian Cason	22	F	6' 7"	210	Freshman	Fontana, California	Summit HS
Ryan Nicholas	32	F	6' 7"	235	Sophomore	Spokane, Washington	Gonzaga Prep
Nemanja Mitrovic	33	G	6' 5"	200	Senior	Toronto, Ontario	Northern Secondary School
David Carr	35	G	6' 3"	170	Freshman	Portland, Oregon	Central Catholic HS

== 2011–12 Schedule and results ==
Date time, TV	Rank^{#}	Opponent^{#}	Result	Record	Site (attendance) city, state
Exhibition
10/29/2011*; 7:00 pm		Concordia	W 81–72	–	Chiles Center (1,294); Portland, OR
11/04/2011*; 7:00 pm		Concordia, Irvine	W 99–97 ^{OT}	–	Chiles Center (N/A); Portland, OR
Regular season
11/12/2011*; 11:30 am		vs. Florida Atlantic; World Vision Classic	W 70–65	1–0	Alaska Airlines Arena (8,465); Seattle, WA
11/13/2011*; 2:30 pm		vs. Georgia State; World Vision Classic	W 66–61	2–0	Alaska Airlines Arena (7,972); Seattle, WA
11/14/2011*; 7:00 pm		at Washington; World Vision Classic	L 63–93	2–1	Alaska Airlines Arena (7,918); Seattle, WA
11/20/2011*; 7:00 pm		Washington State	L 73–83	2–2	Chiles Center (3,613); Portland, OR
11/22/2011*; 7:00 pm		at UC Santa Barbara	L 69–83	2–3	The Thunderdome (2,447); Santa Barbara, CA
11/26/2011*; 4:00 pm, FSSO		at No. 2 Kentucky	L 63–87	2–4	Rupp Arena (24,179); Lexington, KY
11/29/2011*; 7:00 pm		Lewis–Clark State	W 76–64	3–4	Chiles Center (1,223); Portland, OR
12/03/2011*; 5:00 pm		at No. 23 Saint Louis	L 53–73	3–5	Chaifetz Arena (7,087); St. Louis, MO
12/07/2011*; 6:00 pm		at Boise State	L 70–82	3–6	Taco Bell Arena (2,460); Boise, ID
12/10/2011*; 7:00 pm		Ohio	L 54–72	3–7	Chiles Center (2,002); Portland, OR
12/17/2011*; 7:00 pm		Montana	L 65–80	3–8	Chiles Center (1,312); Portland, OR
12/19/2011*; 6:00 pm		at Utah	L 67–72	3–9	Jon M. Huntsman Center (7,910); Salt Lake City, UT
12/22/2011*; 7:00 pm		at Nevada	L 60–78	3–10	Lawlor Events Center (3,651); Reno, NV
12/28/2011; 6:00 pm, RTNW		at Gonzaga	L 51–90	3–11 (0–1)	McCarthey Athletic Center (6,000); Spokane, WA
01/05/2012; 8:00 pm, CSNNW		Santa Clara	W 84–74	4–11 (1–1)	Chiles Center (1,446); Portland, OR
01/08/2012; 5:00 pm, CSNNW		Pepperdine	W 53–43	5–11 (2–1)	Chiles Center (2,206); Portland, OR
01/12/2012; 7:00 pm		at San Francisco	L 70–104	5–12 (2–2)	War Memorial Gymnasium (1,450); San Francisco, CA
01/14/2012; 8:00 pm, CSNNW		at Saint Mary's	L 61–69	5–13 (2–3)	McKeon Pavilion (3,500); Moraga, CA
01/19/2012; 8:00 pm, CSNNW		San Diego	L 63–82	5–14 (2–4)	Chiles Center (1,890); Portland, OR
01/21/2012; 2:00 pm, CSNNW		San Francisco	L 71–72	5–15 (2–5)	Chiles Center (2,132); Portland, OR
01/26/2012; 8:00 pm, ESPN2		Gonzaga	L 62–74	5–16 (2–6)	Chiles Center (4,852); Portland, OR
01/28/2012; 7:00 pm, CSNNW		at Loyola Marymount	L 59–62	5–17 (2–7)	Gersten Pavilion (2,988); Los Angeles, CA
02/02/2012; 7:00 pm, ESPNU		at Santa Clara	W 84–78	6–17 (3–7)	Leavey Center (1,609); Santa Clara, CA
02/04/2012; 7:00 pm, BYUtv		BYU	L 60–79	6–18 (3–8)	Chiles Center (4,159); Portland, OR
02/09/2012; 8:00 pm, CSNNW		Loyola Marymount	L 62–76	6–19 (3–9)	Chiles Center (2,067); Portland, OR
02/16/2012; 5:30 pm, CSNNW		at San Diego	L 75–78 ^{OT}	6–20 (3–10)	Jenny Craig Pavilion (1,835); San Diego, CA
02/18/2012; 7:00 pm, CSNNW		at Pepperdine	L 65–70	6–21 (3–11)	Firestone Fieldhouse (1,149); Malibu, CA
02/23/2012; 7:00 pm, ESPNU		Saint Mary's	L 43–70	6–22 (3–12)	Chiles Center (2,829); Portland, OR
02/25/2012; 3:00 pm, BYUtv		at BYU	L 66–76	6–23 (3–13)	Marriott Center (22,700); Provo, UT
West Coast Conference tournament
02/29/2012; 6:00 pm	(8)	vs. (9) Santa Clara; First Round	W 74–70	7–23	Orleans Arena (N/A); Las Vegas, NV
03/01/2012; 6:00 pm, BYUtv	(8)	vs. (5) San Francisco; Second Round	L 62–84	7–24	Orleans Arena (1,919); Las Vegas, NV
*Non-conference game. ^{#}Rankings from AP Poll. (#) Tournament seedings in parentheses. All times are in Pacific Time.
