= 2011–12 Santa Clara Broncos men's basketball team =

American college basketball season

2011–12 Santa Clara Broncos men's basketball
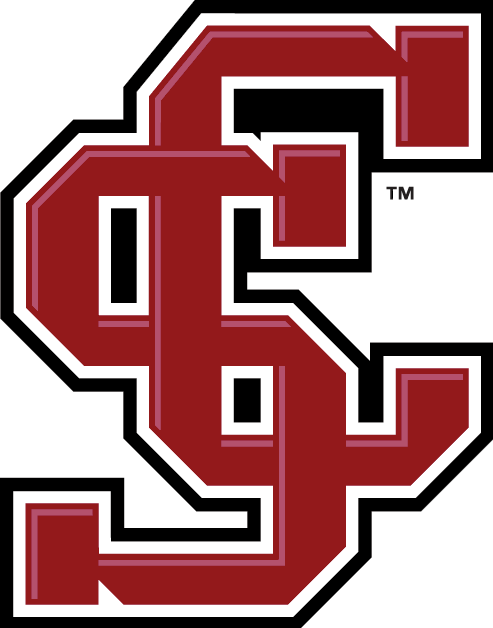
- Conference: West Coast Conference
- Record: 8–22 (0–16 WCC)
- Head coach: Kerry Keating (5th season)
- Assistant coaches: Dustin Kerns; Sam Scholl; James Ware
- Home arena: Leavey Center

2011–12 West Coast Conference men's basketball standings
	Conf.				Overall
Team	W		L	PCT	W		L	PCT
No. 24 Saint Mary's†	14	–	2	.875	27	–	6	.818
Gonzaga	13	–	3	.813	26	–	7	.788
BYU	12	–	4	.750	26	–	9	.743
Loyola Marymount	11	–	5	.688	21	–	13	.618
San Francisco	8	–	8	.500	20	–	14	.588
San Diego	7	–	9	.438	13	–	18	.419
Pepperdine	4	–	12	.250	10	–	19	.345
Portland	3	–	13	.188	7	–	24	.226
Santa Clara	0	–	16	.000	8	–	22	.267
† Conference tournament winner Rankings from AP poll

The 2011–12 Santa Clara Broncos men's basketball team represented Santa Clara University during the 2011–12 NCAA Division I men's basketball season. The Broncos, led by fifth-year head coach Kerry Keating, played their home games at the Leavey Center and are members of the West Coast Conference (WCC). They finished the season 8–22, 0–16 in WCC play to finish in ninth place. The Broncos lost in the first round of the WCC tournament to Portland.

== Roster ==
Number	Name	Position	Height	Weight	Year	Hometown
0	Evan Roquemore	Guard	6–3	175	Sophomore	Henderson, Nevada
3	Brandon Clark	Guard	6–0	165	Freshman	East Chicago, Indiana
4	Kyle Perricone	Guard	6–3	195	Junior	Palo Alto, California
5	Jordan Akwenuke	Forward	6–6	195	Freshman	Portland, Oregon
10	Nick Lamson	Guard	6–3	190	Freshman	Los Gatos, California
12	Demetri Posey	Guard	5–10	175	Freshman	Portland, Oregon
14	Karim York	Forward	6–8	190	Freshman	Austin, Texas
15	Marc Trasolini	Forward	6–9	235	Senior	Vancouver, British Columbia, Canada
20	Denzel Johnson	Guard	6–3	195	Freshman	Fresno, California
21	Kevin Foster	Guard	6–2	219	Junior	Katy, Texas
24	Julian Clarke	Guard	6–3	200	RS Freshman	Toronto, Ontario, Canada
25	John McArthur	Forward	6–9	230	Sophomore	Danville, California
31	Niyi Harrison	Forward	6–8	225	Junior	Milpitas, California
33	Phillip Bach	Guard	6–4	195	Senior	Medina, Washington
35	Robert Garrett	Center	7–0	255	Freshman	Sacramento, California
42	Raymond Cowels III	Forward	6–4	215	Sophomore	Minneapolis, Minnesota
44	Yannick Atanga	Forward	6–8	225	RS Freshman	Yaoundé, Cameroon

== Schedule ==
Date time, TV	Rank^{#}	Opponent^{#}	Result	Record	Site (attendance) city, state
Exhibition
11/05/2011*; 6:00 pm		Ryerson	W 91–60	–	Leavey Center (N/A); Santa Clara, CA
Regular season
11/11/2011*; 7:30 pm		UC Merced	W 80–48	1–0	Leavey Center (2,061); Santa Clara, CA
11/15/2011*; 7:00 pm		at UC Santa Barbara	L 56–89	1–1	The Thunderdome (2,331); Santa Barbara, CA
11/19/2011*; 7:00 pm		San Jose State	W 84–58	2–1	Leavey Center (2,816); Santa Clara, CA
11/24/2011*; 7:00 pm, ESPNU		vs. New Mexico; 76 Classic Quarterfinals	W 79–76 ^{OT}	3–1	Anaheim Convention Center (N/A); Anaheim, CA
11/25/2011*; 9:00 pm, ESPN2		vs. Oklahoma; 76 Classic Semifinals	L 75–83	3–2	Anaheim Convention Center (1,777); Anaheim, CA
11/27/2011*; 3:30 pm, ESPNU		vs. Villanova; 76 Classic 3rd place game	W 65–64	4–2	Anaheim Convention Center (N/A); Anaheim, CA
12/03/2011; 7:00 pm		Cal State Northridge	W 71–58	5–2	Leavey Center (1,864); Santa Clara, CA
12/11/2011*; 1:00 pm		at Washington State	L 55–93	5–3	Beasley Coliseum (2,711); Pullman, WA
12/13/2011*; 7:00 pm		Pacifica	W 84–59	6–3	Leavey Center (1,325); Santa Clara, CA
12/17/2011*; 2:00 pm		Pacific	W 78–76 ^{OT}	7–3	Leavey Center (1,877); Santa Clara, CA
12/21/2011*; 5:00 pm, FSHOU		at Houston Baptist	L 71–72	7–4	Sharp Gymnasium (579); Houston, TX
12/29/2011*; 8:15 pm		Eastern Michigan; Cable Car Classic semifinals	W 75–55	8–4	Leavey Center (1,782); Santa Clara, CA
12/30/2011*; 8:15 pm		Wagner; Cable Car Classic Championship	L 62–64	8–5	Leavey Center (1,702); Santa Clara, CA
01/05/2012; 8:00 pm, CSNCA		at Portland	L 74–84	8–6 (0–1)	Chiles Center (1,446); Portland, OR
01/07/2012; 5:00 pm, CSN+		at No. 25 Gonzaga	L 62–80	8–7 (0–2)	McCarthey Athletic Center (6,000); Spokane, WA
01/12/2012; 7:00 pm		San Diego	L 62–75	8–8 (0–3)	Leavey Center (2,032); Santa Clara, CA
01/14/2012; 5:00 pm, ESPNU		at BYU	L 78–95	8–9 (0–4)	Marriott Center (16,116); Provo, UT
01/21/2012; 8:00 pm, CSNCA		Saint Mary's	L 77–93	8–10 (0–5)	Leavey Center (4,700); Santa Clara, CA
01/23/2012; 7:00 pm		Loyola Marymount	L 62–74	8–11 (0–6)	Leavey Center (1,810); Santa Clara, CA
01/26/2012; 7:00 pm, CSNCA		San Francisco	L 77–90	8–12 (0–7)	Leavey Center (2,084); Santa Clara, CA
01/28/2012; 7:00 pm		at Pepperdine	L 62–74	8–13 (0–8)	Firestone Fieldhouse (1,298); Malibu, CA
02/02/2012; 7:00 pm, ESPNU		Portland	L 78–84	8–14 (0–9)	Leavey Center (1,609); Santa Clara, CA
02/04/2012; 4:00 pm, CSNBA		at San Diego	L 65–70	8–15 (0–10)	Jenny Craig Pavilion (2,905); San Diego, CA
02/09/2012; 8:00 pm, ESPNU		at San Francisco	L 69–85	8–16 (0–11)	War Memorial Gymnasium (2,673); San Francisco, CA
02/11/2012; 8:00 pm, CSNCA+		at No. 16 Saint Mary's	L 67–82	8–17 (0–12)	McKeon Pavilion (3,500); Moraga, CA
02/16/2012; 8:00 pm, ESPN2		No. 24 Gonzaga	L 62–73	8–18 (0–13)	Leavey Center (4,700); Santa Clara, CA
02/18/2012; 4:00 pm, ESPNU		BYU	L 62–87	8–19 (0–14)	Leavey Center (4,700); Santa Clara, CA
02/23/2012; 7:00 pm, CSNCA		Pepperdine	L 57–63	8–20 (0–15)	Leavey Center (2,188); Santa Clara, CA
02/25/2012; 8:00 pm, CSNCA		at Loyola Marymount	L 65–68	8–21 (0–16)	Gersten Pavilion (2,743); Los Angeles, CA
West Coast Conference tournament
02/29/2012; 6:00 pm		vs. Portland; First Round	L 70–74	8–22	Orleans Arena (N/A); Paradise, NV
*Non-conference game. ^{#}Rankings from AP Poll. (#) Tournament seedings in parentheses. All times are in Pacific Time.
