= 2011–12 Pepperdine Waves men's basketball team =

American college basketball season

2011–12 Pepperdine Waves men's basketball
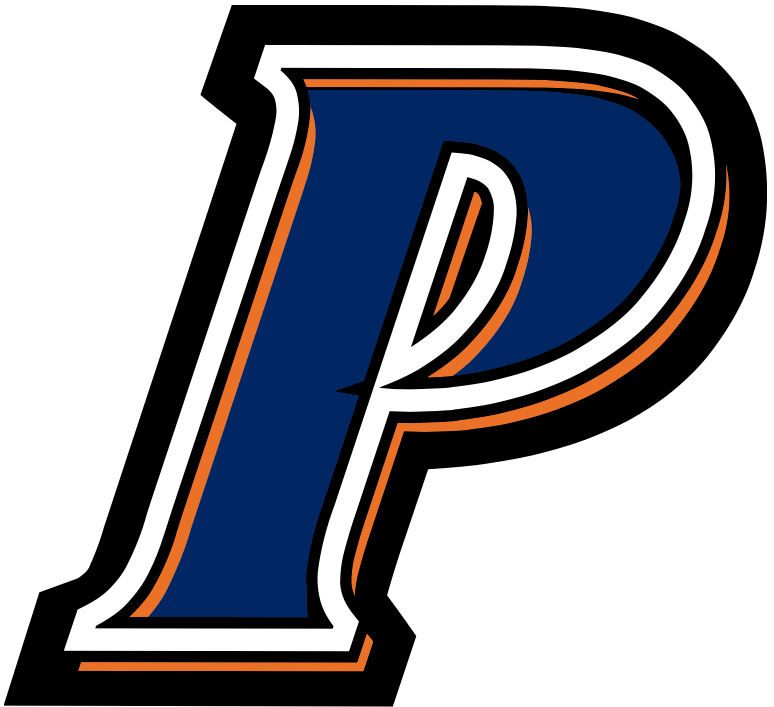
- Conference: West Coast Conference
- Record: 10–19 (4–12 WCC)
- Head coach: Marty Wilson (1st season)
- Assistant coaches: Mark Amaral; Bryant Moore; Damin Lopez
- Home arena: Firestone Fieldhouse

2011–12 West Coast Conference men's basketball standings
	Conf.				Overall
Team	W		L	PCT	W		L	PCT
No. 24 Saint Mary's†	14	–	2	.875	27	–	6	.818
Gonzaga	13	–	3	.813	26	–	7	.788
BYU	12	–	4	.750	26	–	9	.743
Loyola Marymount	11	–	5	.688	21	–	13	.618
San Francisco	8	–	8	.500	20	–	14	.588
San Diego	7	–	9	.438	13	–	18	.419
Pepperdine	4	–	12	.250	10	–	19	.345
Portland	3	–	13	.188	7	–	24	.226
Santa Clara	0	–	16	.000	8	–	22	.267
† Conference tournament winner Rankings from AP poll

The 2011–12 Pepperdine Waves men's basketball team represented Pepperdine University in the 2011–12 NCAA Division I men's basketball season. This was the head coach Marty Wilson's first full season at Pepperdine, though he was the team's interim head coach in the 1990s for half of a season. The Waves played their home games at the Firestone Fieldhouse and are members of the West Coast Conference. They finished the season 10–19, 4–12 in WCC play to finish in seventh place and lost in the second round of the West Coast Conference tournament to San Diego.

== Roster ==
2011–12 Pepperdine Waves men's basketball team
Players
Coaches

Pos.	#	Name	Height	Weight	Year	Previous school	Hometown
G	1	Jordan Baker	6 ft 3 in (1.91 m)	180 lb (82 kg)	Fr	Tempe	Tempe, AZ
G	2	Dominic Redix	6 ft 0 in (1.83 m)	185 lb (84 kg)	Jr	Granite Hills	Apple Valley, CA
G	10	Joshua Lowery	6 ft 3 in (1.91 m)	195 lb (88 kg)	Jr	Desert Vista	Phoenix, AZ
G	11	Richard Branning	6 ft 2 in (1.88 m)	175 lb (79 kg)	Sr	Menlo-Atherton	Menlo Park, CA
G/F	14	Dane Suttle Jr. (injured)	6 ft 6 in (1.98 m)	210 lb (95 kg)	Sr	Summit College Prep	Los Angeles, CA
G	20	Lorne Jackson (redshirt)	6 ft 2 in (1.88 m)	205 lb (93 kg)	Sr	Simi Valley	Simi Valley, CA
F	21	Hector Harold	6 ft 7 in (2.01 m)	205 lb (93 kg)	So	Northfield Mount Hermon School	Pasadena, CA
G	23	Caleb Willis	6 ft 2 in (1.88 m)	220 lb (100 kg)	Jr	Stockbridge	Stockbridge, GA
F	24	Ramon Eaton	6 ft 8 in (2.03 m)	200 lb (91 kg)	Fr	Sheldon	Sacramento, CA
G	31	Nikolas Skouen	6 ft 4 in (1.93 m)	190 lb (86 kg)	So	Pratt CC	Bergen, Norway
G	33	Don Martin	6 ft 4 in (1.93 m)	195 lb (88 kg)	Sr	Oak Park	Gladstone, MO
F	34	Manny Ochenje	6 ft 9 in (2.06 m)	205 lb (93 kg)	Fr	Brehm Prep	Abuja, Nigeria
F	41	Taylor Darby	6 ft 8 in (2.03 m)	230 lb (104 kg)	Sr	Mission Hills	San Marcos, CA
C	44	Corbin Moore	6 ft 10 in (2.08 m)	235 lb (107 kg)	Sr	Los Alamitos	Cypress, CA
F	50	Moriba De Freitas (injured) (redshirt)	6 ft 9 in (2.06 m)	220 lb (100 kg)	Jr	Williston State JC	Bon Air Gardens, Trinidad
C	55	Jan Maehlen (redshirt)	7 ft 0 in (2.13 m)	315 lb (143 kg)	So	Ironwood Ridge	Tucson, Arizona

Head coach

- Marty Wilson (Pepperdine)

Assistant coach(es)

- Marak Amaral (College of Idaho)
- Bryant Moore (Texas Tech)
- Damin Lopez (Pepperdine)

Legend

- (C) Team captain
- (S) Suspended
- (I) Ineligible
- (W) Walk-on
- Injured
- Current redshirt

== Schedule and results ==
Date time, TV	Rank^{#}	Opponent^{#}	Result	Record	Site (attendance) city, state
Exhibition
11/05/2011*; 7:00pm		Occidental	W 78–72	–	Firestone Fieldhouse (NA); Malibu, CA
Regular season
11/12/2011*; 7:00pm, TV-32 Malibu		Pomona-Pitzer	W 59–50	1–0	Firestone Fieldhouse (875); Malibu, CA
11/15/2011*; 5:30pm		at Arizona State	W 66–60	2–0	Wells Fargo Arena (4,127); Tempe, AZ
11/19/2011*; 7:00pm		at Cal State Bakersfield	L 70–79	2–1	Rabobank Arena (1,748); Bakersfield, CA
11/21/2011*; 7:00pm, TV-32 Malibu		Central Michigan	L 57–67	2–2	Firestone Fieldhouse (689); Malibu, CA
11/26/2011*; 10:00am		at UTSA	W 70–64 ^{OT}	3–2	Convocation Center (874); San Antonio, TX
11/28/2011*; 8:00pm, Prime Ticket		at UCLA	L 39–62	3–3	LA Sports Arena (3,885); Los Angeles, CA
12/03/2011*; 7:00pm, TV-32 Malibu		Hawaiʻi	W 73–67	4–3	Firestone Fieldhouse (1,206); Malibu, CA
12/07/2011*; 5:30 pm, Prime Ticket		at Northern Arizona	W 49–40	5–3	Walkup Skydome (617); Flagsaff, AZ
12/10/2011*; 7:00pm, TV-32 Malibu		Cal State Northridge	L 70–73	5–4	Firestone Fieldhouse (1,088); Malibu, CA
12/18/2011*; 5:00pm, TV-32 Malibu		Montana State	W 59–36	6–4	Firestone Fieldhouse (703); Malibu, CA
12/22/2011*; 7:00pm		vs. Washington State; Cougar Hardwood Classic	L 56–67	6–5	KeyArena (9,831); Seattle, WA
12/29/2011; 7:00pm, TV-32 Malibu		San Francisco	W 77–61	7–5 (1–0)	Firestone Fieldhouse (821); Malibu, CA
12/31/2011; 3:00pm, TV-32 Malibu		Saint Mary's	L 45–74	7–6 (1–1)	Firestone Fieldhouse (741); Malibu, CA
01/05/2012; 6:00pm, ROOT		at No. 25 Gonzaga	L 45–73	7–7 (1–2)	McCarthey Athletic Center (6,000); Spokane, WA
01/07/2012; 5:00pm, FS West		at Portland	L 74–84	7–8 (1–3)	Chiles Center (2,206); Portland, OR
01/12/2012; 7:00pm, ESPNU		Loyola Marymount	L 58–68	7–9 (1–4)	Firestone Fieldhouse (1,582); Malibu, CA
01/14/2012; 1:30pm, Prime Ticket		at San Francisco	L 63–78	7–10 (1–5)	War Memorial Gymnasium (N/A); San Francisco, CA
01/19/2012; 7:00pm		at Saint Mary's	L 47–61	7–11 (1–6)	McKeon Pavilion (3,500); Moraga, CA
01/21/2012; 5:00pm, FS West		BYU	L 64–77	7–12 (1–7)	Firestone Fieldhouse (3,104); Malibu, CA
01/26/2012; 7:00pm		at San Diego	L 56–65	7–13 (1–8)	Jenny Craig Pavilion (1,830); San Diego, CA
01/28/2012; 7:00pm, TV-32 Malibu		Santa Clara	W 74–62	8–13 (2–8)	Firestone Fieldhouse (1,298); Malibu, CA
02/02/2012; 7:30pm, Prime Ticket		at Loyola Marymount	L 57–67	8–14 (2–9)	Gersten Pavilion (3,016); Los Angeles, CA
02/04/2012; 7:00pm, ROOT		No. 24 Gonzaga	L 60–72	8–15 (2–10)	Firestone Fieldhouse (2,120); Malibu, CA
02/09/2012; 7:00pm, TV-32 Malibu		San Diego	L 57–70	8–16 (2–11)	Firestone Fieldhouse (747); Malibu, CA
02/11/2012; 3:00pm, FS West		at BYU	L 48–86	8–17 (2–12)	Marriott Center (19,008); Provo, UT
02/16/2012*; 7:10pm		at Seattle	L 70–81	8–18	KeyArena (2,959); Seattle, WA
02/18/2012; 7:00pm, Prime Ticket		Portland	W 70–65	9–18 (3–12)	Firestone Fieldhouse (1,149); Malibu, CA
02/23/2012; 7:00pm, Prime Ticket		at Santa Clara	W 63–57	10–18 (4–12)	Leavey Center (2,188); Santa Clara, CA
2012 West Coast Conference men's basketball tournament
03/01/2012; 8:30pm, BYUtv		vs. San Diego; Second Round	L 54–76	10–19	Orleans Arena (1,919); Las Vegas, Nevada
*Non-conference game. ^{#}Rankings from AP Poll. (#) Tournament seedings in parentheses.
