= 2011–12 Washington State Cougars men's basketball team =

American college basketball season

2011–12 Washington State Cougars men's basketball

CBI, Runner Up
- Conference: Pac-12 Conference
- Record: 19–18 (7–11 Pac-12)
- Head coach: Ken Bone
- Assistant coaches: Curtis Allen; Jeff Hironaka; Ben Johnson
- Home arena: Beasley Coliseum

2011–12 Pac-12 Conference men's basketball standings
	Conf.				Overall
Team	W		L	PCT	W		L	PCT
Washington	14	–	4	.778	24	–	11	.686
California	13	–	5	.722	24	–	10	.706
Oregon	13	–	5	.722	24	–	10	.706
Arizona	12	–	6	.667	23	–	12	.657
Colorado †	11	–	7	.611	24	–	12	.667
UCLA	11	–	7	.611	19	–	14	.576
Stanford	10	–	8	.556	26	–	11	.703
Oregon State	7	–	11	.389	21	–	15	.583
Washington State	7	–	11	.389	19	–	18	.514
Arizona State	6	–	12	.333	10	–	21	.323
Utah	3	–	15	.167	6	–	25	.194
USC	1	–	17	.056	6	–	26	.188
† Conference tournament winner As of March 8, 2012; Rankings from AP poll

The 2011–12 Washington State Cougars men's basketball team represented Washington State University during the 2011–12 NCAA Division I men's basketball season. The team played its home games on Jack Friel Court at Beasley Coliseum in Pullman, Washington and are members of the Pac-12 Conference. They were led by third year head coach Ken Bone. They finished with the record of 19–18 overall, 7–11 in Pac-12 play. They lost in the first round of the Pac-12 Basketball tournament to Oregon State . They were invited to the 2012 College Basketball Invitational where they advanced to the best of three finals series, falling to Pittsburgh 2 games to 1.

== Previous season ==
The Cougars went 22–13 for the 2010–11 season. They then made the NIT semifinals where they were eliminated by Wichita State.

== Departures ==
The Cougars lost their leading scorer Klay Thompson because of the 2011 NBA draft. He was averaging over 21 points per game. In addition to Klay Thompson, they also lost DeAngelo Casto due to play in the Turkish league and Dre Winston transfer to Portland State.

== Roster ==
Name	Number	Position	Height	Weight	Year	Hometown	Last School/College
Marcus Capers	0	Guard	6–4	179	Senior	Winter Haven, FL	Montverde Acad.
Reggie Moore	1	Guard	6–1	178	Junior	Seattle, WA	Brewster Acad.
Mike Ladd	2	Guard	6–5	195	RS Junior	Seattle, WA	Fresno State
DaVonté Lacy	3	Guard	6–3	206	Freshman	Tacoma, WA	Curtis Sr. HS
Chuks Iroegbu	4	Guard	6–3	200	Freshman	Elk Grove, CA	Franklin HS
Will DiIorio	5	Guard	6–5	190	Sophomore	Bainbridge Island, WA	Bainbridge HS
Faisal Aden	11	Guard	6–4	179	Senior	San Diego, CA	Hillsborough CC
Brock Motum	12	Forward	6–10	245	Junior	Brisbane, AUS	Australian Institute of Sport
Dominic Ballard	21	Guard	6–4	199	Freshman	Seattle, WA	Bothell HS
Royce Woolridge	22	Guard	6–3	175	Sophomore	Phoenix, AZ	Kansas
D. J. Shelton	23	Forward	6–10	240	RS Sophomore	Rialto, CA	Citrus College
Abe Lodwick	31	Forward/Guard	6–7	215	RS Senior	Bend, OR	Mountain View HS
Dexter Kernich-Drew	34	Guard	6–6	182	RS Freshman	Melbourne, AUS	Caulfield Grammar School
Charlie Enquist	40	Forward	6–10	230	RS Senior	Edmonds, WA	King's HS
Patrick Simon	44	Forward	6–8	215	Sophomore	Ephrata, WA	Ephrata HS

== Schedule ==
Date time, TV	Rank^{#}	Opponent^{#}	Result	Record	Site (attendance) city, state
Exhibition
11/05/2011*; 6:00 pm		Lewis–Clark State	W 88–41	–	Beasley Coliseum (3,117); Pullman, WA
Regular Season
11/14/2011*; 9:00 pm, ESPN		at No. 22 Gonzaga; Rivalry	L 81–89	0–1	McCarthey Athletic Center (6,000); Spokane, WA
11/17/2011*; 7:05 pm		Sacramento State	W 79–68	1–1	Beasley Coliseum (4,117); Pullman, WA
11/20/2011*; 7:00 pm		at Portland	W 83–73	2–1	Chiles Center (3,613); Portland, OR
11/24/2011*; 8:30 pm, ESPN2		vs. Oklahoma; 76 Classic first round	L 59–74	2–2	Anaheim Convention Center (1,457); Anaheim, CA
11/25/2011*; 6:30 pm, ESPNU		vs. New Mexico; 76 Classic loser bracket	L 62–72	2–3	Anaheim Convention Center (N/A); Anaheim, CA
11/27/2011*; 10:30 am, ESPN3		vs. UC Riverside; 76 Classic 7th place game	L 63–64	2–4	Anaheim Convention Center (N/A); Anaheim, CA
11/30/2011*; 5:30 pm		Grambling State	W 69–37	3–4	Beasley Coliseum (2,930); Pullman, WA
12/03/2011*; 3:30 pm, RTNW		Eastern Washington	W 75–49	4–4	Beasley Coliseum (4,002); Pullman, WA
12/07/2011*; 7:05 pm		at Idaho; Battle of the Palouse	W 66–64	5–4	Cowan Spectrum (3,321); Moscow, ID
12/11/2011*; 1:00 pm		Santa Clara	W 93–55	6–4	Beasley Coliseum (2,711); Pullman, WA
12/18/2011*; 4:35 pm		Western Oregon	W 66–42	7–4	Beasley Coliseum (2,318); Pullman, WA
12/22/2011*; 7:00 pm		vs. Pepperdine; Cougar Hardwood Classic	W 67–56	8–4	KeyArena (9,831); Seattle, WA
12/29/2011; 6:00 pm, CSNNW		vs. Oregon	L 75–92	8–5 (0–1)	Spokane Arena (9,889); Spokane, WA
12/31/2011; 3:00 pm, RTNW		vs. Oregon State	W 81–76	9–5 (1–1)	Spokane Arena (8,282); Spokane, WA
01/05/2012; 6:00 pm		at Utah	L 60–62 ^{OT}	9–6 (1–2)	Jon M. Huntsman Center (8,412); Salt Lake City, UT
01/07/2012; 1:00 pm, FSN		at Colorado	L 60–71	9–7 (1–3)	Coors Events Center (8,518); Boulder, CO
01/15/2012; 4:00 pm, FSN		at Washington; Rivalry	L 65–75	9–8 (1–4)	Alaska Airlines Arena (10,000); Seattle, WA
01/19/2012; 7:05 pm		Stanford	W 81–69	10–8 (2–4)	Beasley Coliseum (3,119); Pullman, WA
01/21/2012; 3:05 pm		California	W 77–75	11–8 (3–4)	Beasley Coliseum (5,013); Pullman, WA
01/26/2012; 7:30 pm, FSN		at Arizona	L 61–85	11–9 (3–5)	McKale Center (14,138); Tucson, AZ
01/28/2012; 2:00 pm, RTNW		at Arizona State	L 67–71	11–10 (3–6)	Wells Fargo Arena (6,224); Tempe, AZ
02/02/2012; 7:05 pm		USC	W 60–53	12–10 (4–6)	Beasley Coliseum (4,002); Pullman, WA
02/04/2012; 2:00 pm, RTNW		UCLA	L 60–63	12–11 (4–7)	Beasley Coliseum (4,204); Pullman, WA
02/09/2012; 7:00 pm		at Oregon State	W 83–73	13–11 (5–7)	Gill Coliseum (5,782); Corvallis, OR
02/11/2012; 3:00 pm		at Oregon	L 69–78	13–12 (5–8)	Matthew Knight Arena (10,071); Eugene, OR
02/16/2012; 6:00 pm, FSN		Arizona	L 72–76	13–13 (5–9)	Beasley Coliseum (3,616); Pullman, WA
02/18/2012; 5:00 pm, RTNW		Arizona State	W 72–50	14–13 (6–9)	Beasley Coliseum (5,218); Pullman, WA
02/25/2012; 5:00 pm, RTNW		Washington; Rivalry	L 55–59	14–14 (6–10)	Beasley Coliseum (9,325); Pullman, WA
03/01/2012; 7:30 pm		at UCLA	L 46–78	14–15 (6–11)	LA Sports Arena (5,099); Los Angeles, CA
03/03/2012; 3:00 pm		at USC	W 43–38	15–15 (7–11)	Galen Center (3,102); Los Angeles, CA
Pac-12 Conference tournament
03/07/2012; 12:10 pm, FSN		vs. Oregon State; First Round	L 64–69	15–16	Staples Center (N/A); Los Angeles, CA
2012 College Basketball Invitational
03/14/2012*; 7:00 pm, HDNet		at San Francisco; First Round	W 89–75	16–16	War Memorial Gymnasium (1,277); San Francisco, CA
03/19/2012*; 7:00 pm		Wyoming; Quarterfinals	W 61–41	17–16	Beasley Coliseum (3,019); Pullman, WA
03/21/2012*; 7:00 pm, HDNet		at Oregon State; Semifinals	W 72–55	18–16	Gill Coliseum (2,190); Corvallis, OR
03/26/2012*; 7:00 pm, HDNet		Pittsburgh; Finals–Game 1	W 67–66	19–16	Beasley Coliseum (4,226); Pullman, WA
03/28/2012*; 4:00 pm, HDNet		at Pittsburgh; Finals–Game 2	L 53–57	19–17	Petersen Events Center (3,349); Pittsburgh, PA
03/30/2012*; 4:00 pm, HDNet		at Pittsburgh; Finals–Game 3	L 65–71	19–18	Petersen Events Center (3,849); Pittsburgh, PA
*Non-conference game. ^{#}Rankings from AP Poll. (#) Tournament seedings in parentheses. All times are in Pacific Time.
