= Angelo Caloiaro =

American-Italian basketball player (born 1989)

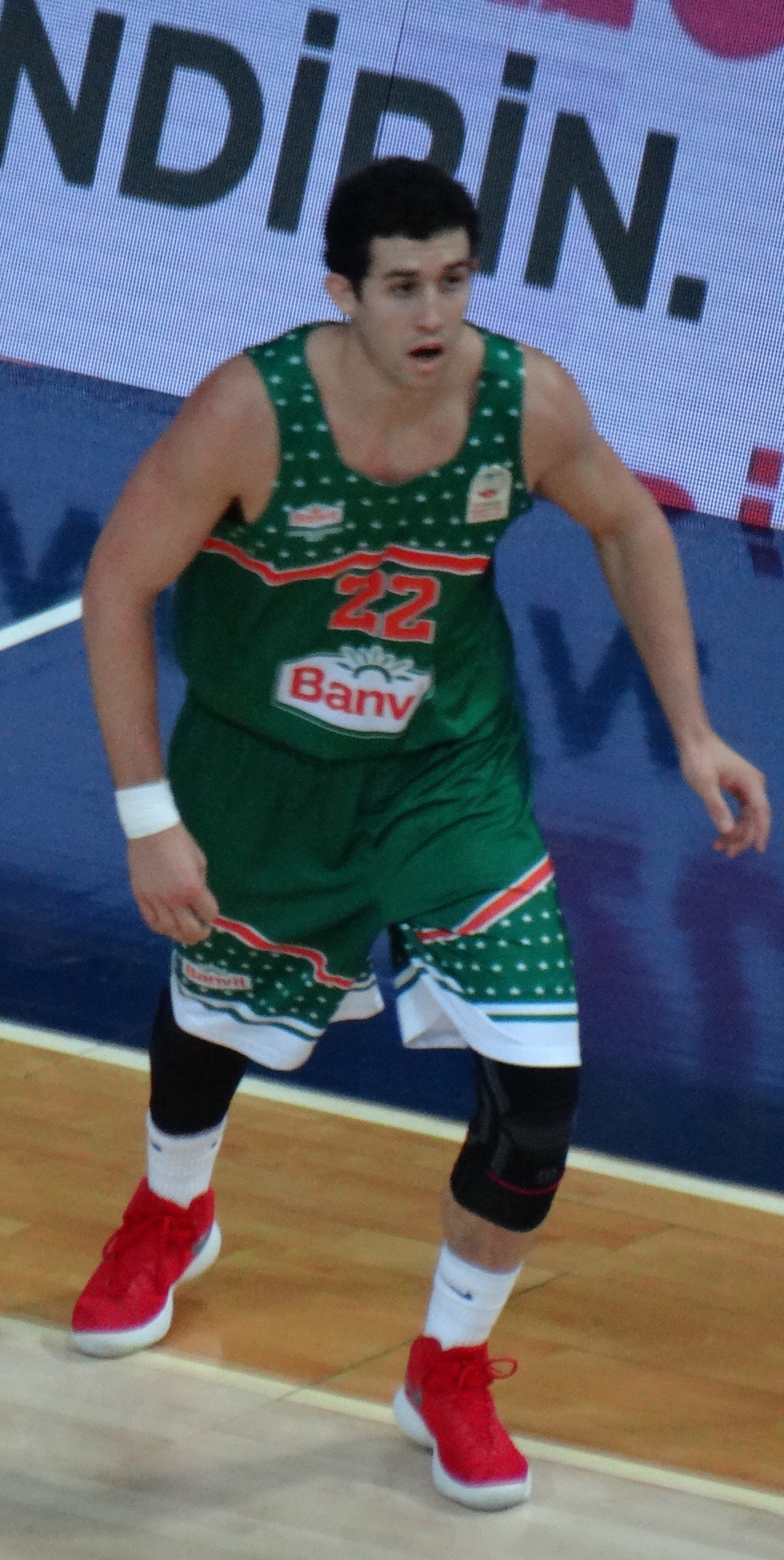
- Caloiaro with Banvit in October 2017

No. 32 – Kyoto Hannaryz
- Position: Power forward / small forward
- League: B.League

Personal information
- Born: July 28, 1989 (age 37) San Jose, California
- Listed height: 6 ft 8 in (2.03 m)
- Listed weight: 225 lb (102 kg)

Career information
- High school: Archbishop Mitty (San Jose, California)
- College: San Francisco (2008–2012)
- NBA draft: 2012: undrafted
- Playing career: 2013–present

Career history
- 2013: Rilski Sportist
- 2013–2014: Mitteldeutscher BC
- 2014–2015: Bonn
- 2015–2016: Obradoiro
- 2016–2017: Büyükçekmece
- 2017–2018: Banvit
- 2018–2022: Maccabi Tel Aviv
- 2022–2023: Galatasaray Nef
- 2023–2024: Osaka Evessa
- 2024–present: Kyoto Hannaryz

Career highlights
- 3× Israeli League champion (2019, 2020, 2021); All-BBL First Team (2014); BBL All-Star (2014); First-team All-WCC (2012)

Angelo Dominik Caloiaro (born July 28, 1989) is an American-Italian professional basketball player for Kyoto Hannaryz of the B.League. He played college basketball for the University San Francisco before playing professionally in Bulgaria, Germany, Spain, Turkey and Israel. Standing at 6 ft 8 in (2.03 m), he plays at the power forward and small forward positions.

== Early life ==
Caloiaro attended Archbishop Mitty High School in San Jose, California, where he led the team to the 2008 State Division II title game. He ranked second on the team in scoring (16.8) and led the squad in rebounding (8.6). Caloiaro captured First Team honors from the San Jose Mercury News and earned all-West Catholic Athletic League second team honors after senior season.

== College career ==
Caloiaro played college basketball for the University of San Francisco's Dons, and in his junior season averaged 7.3 rebounds per game (3rd in the WCC). He averaged 14.2 points (6th in the WCC), 5.9 rebounds, 2.3 assists and 1.5 steals (5th) per game as a senior in 2011–12. He was 3rd in the WCC with a .580 two-point field goal percentage, and 6th with a .793 free throw percentage. Caloiaro ranked fifth on USF career 3-pointer list with 131 and tied for third in the West Coast Conference with six double-double performances. On February 28, 2012, Caloiaro earned a spot in the First-team All-WCC.

== Professional career ==
=== Rilski (2013) ===
On January 31, 2013, Caloiaro signed with the Bulgarian team Rilski Sportist for the rest of the season. On April 7, 2013, Caloiaro recorded a season-high 26 points, shooting 9-of-13 from the field, along with 12 rebounds in a 91–95 loss to Cherno More.

=== Mitteldeutscher BC (2013–2014) ===
On June 14, 2013, Caloiaro signed with the German team Mitteldeutscher BC for the 2013–14 season. On December 28, 2013, Caloiaro recorded a season-high 25 points, shooting 9-of-11 from the field, along with six rebounds and two assists in an 83–77 win over Medi Bayreuth. On January 18, 2014, Caloiaro participated in the 2014 BBL All-Star Game. On February 5, 2014, Caloiaro was named MVP of the Month for games played in January.

Caloiaro finished his first season in Germany as the 2014 BBL Regular Season fifth-leading rebounder with 6.8 per game and also averaged 12 points and 1.5 assists per game. On April 24, 2014, Caloiaro earned a spot in the All-BBL First Team.

=== Telekom Bonn (2014–2015) ===
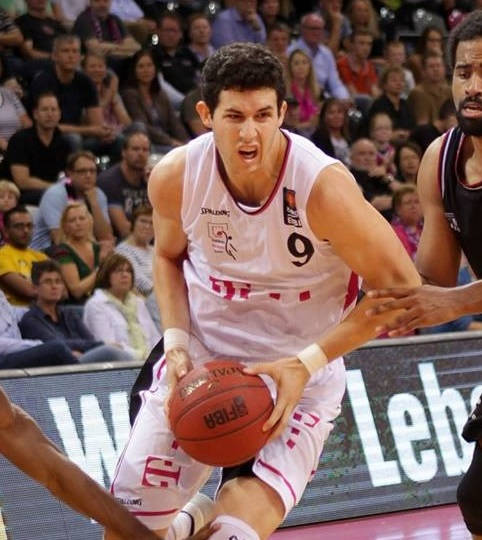
Caloiaro with Telekom Bonn in November 2014

On July 25, 2014, Caloiaro signed a one-year deal with Telekom Baskets Bonn. On April 17, 2015, Caloiaro recorded a season-high 26 points, shooting 9-of-15 from the field, along with seven rebounds and two steals in a 78–71 win over Eisbaren Bremerhaven.

Caloiaro helped Bonn reach the 2015 BBL-Pokal Semifinals (German Cup) and the 2015 BBL Playoffs, where they eventually lost to ratiopharm Ulm.

=== Obradoiro (2015–2016) ===
On August 1, 2015, Caloiaro signed with the Spanish team Obradoiro CAB for the 2015–16 season. On March 6, 2016, Caloiaro recorded a season-high 23 points, shooting 9-of-13 from the field, along with six rebounds and two steals in an 81–64 win over Manresa.

=== Büyükçekmece (2016–2017) ===
On July 3, 2016, Caloiaro signed with the Turkish team Büyükçekmece for the 2016–17 season. On February 11, 2017, Caloiaro recorded a double-double with a season-high 23 points and 14 rebounds, shooting 8-of-15 from the field in 69–73 loss to Tofaş.

Caloiaro helped Büyükçekmece reach the 2017 FIBA Europe Cup Round of 16, where they eventually lost to Enisey.

=== Banvit (2017–2018) ===
On July 5, 2017, Caloiaro signed a one-year deal with Banvit. On May 28, 2018, Caloiaro recorded a career-high 29 points, shooting 10-of-12 from the field, along with 5 rebounds, 5 assists and 3 steals in 81–86 playoff loss to Fenerbahçe.

Caloiaro helped Banvit reach the 2018 Turkish League Semifinals, as well as reaching the 2018 FIBA Champions League Quarterfinals, where they eventually lost to Monaco. In 54 games played during the 2017–18 season (played in the Turkish League and the Champions League), Caloiaro averaged 12.4 points, 5.7 rebounds, 1.8 assists and 1.2 steals per game, shooting 43.8 percent from 3-point range.

=== Maccabi Tel Aviv (2018–2022) ===
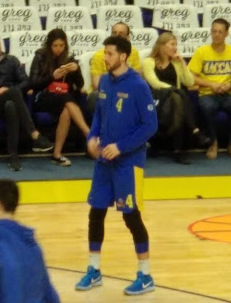
Caloiaro with Maccabi Tel Aviv in March 2019

On June 26, 2018, Caloiaro joined the Israeli team Maccabi Tel Aviv of the EuroLeague, signing a one-year deal. On January 24, 2019, Caloiaro recorded a double-double of 20 points and 11 rebounds, shooting 6-of-9 from the field in an 84–75 win over Panathinaikos. Two days later, Caloiaro was named EuroLeague Round 20 MVP. Caloiaro helped Maccabi win the Israeli League championship title.

On June 30, 2019, Caloiaro signed a one-year contract extension with Maccabi. He averaged 7.2 points and 5.3 rebounds per game during the 2020–21 season. On July 11, 2021, Caloiaro re-signed with the team.

=== Galatasaray Nef (2022–2023) ===
On 15 July 2022, he has signed with Galatasaray Nef of the Turkish Basketbol Süper Ligi (BSL).

=== Osaka Evessa (2023–2024) ===
On June 20, 2023, he signed with Osaka Evessa of the B.League.

=== Kyoto Hannaryz (2024–present) ===
On June 13, 2024, Caloiaro signed with Kyoto Hannaryz of the B.League.

== Personal life ==
Both of Caloiaro's parents played college basketball, his brother Vinny played professional soccer and sister Joan played high-level college volleyball. Then there are cousins who played for the U.S.A. national teams in soccer and rugby and another, Kerri Walsh Jennings, who won three Olympic gold medals in beach volleyball.

== Career statistics ==
Legend
GP	Games played	MPG	Minutes per game	FG%	Field goal percentage
3P%	3-point field goal percentage	FT%	Free throw percentage	RPG	Rebounds per game
APG	Assists per game	SPG	Steals per game	BPG	Blocks per game
PPG	Points per game	**Bold**	Career high		Led the league

=== College ===
Year	Team	GP	GS	MPG	FG%	3P%	FT%	RPG	APG	SPG	BPG	PPG
2008–09	San Francisco	30	13	25.4	.411	.274	.689	3.9	1.3	.6	**.2**	6.0
2009–10	San Francisco	30	28	28.0	**.497**	**.491**	.732	3.6	1.6	.7	.1	8.9
2010–11	San Francisco	**34**	**34**	**33.4**	.395	.327	.787	**7.2**	1.8	.7	**.2**	9.9
2011–12	San Francisco	**34**	**34**	30.9	.486	.382	**.795**	5.9	**2.3**	**1.7**	**.2**	**14.0**
Career		128	109	29.6	.448	.372	.770	5.3	1.8	.9	.2	9.8

=== EuroLeague ===
Year	Team	GP	GS	MPG	FG%	3P%	FT%	RPG	APG	SPG	BPG	PPG	PIR
2018–19	Maccabi	30	**27**	24.7	**.478**	.315	.792	**4.8**	1.4	**1.2**	**.1**	**7.4**	**10.2**
2019–20	Maccabi	18	10	21.0	.456	**.344**	.818	2.8	1.4	0.7	.0	5.6	
2020–21	Maccabi	33	**27**	**25.6**	.464	.317	.818	3.4	**1.7**	0.9	**.1**	5.9	
2021–22	Maccabi	**35**	18	19.8	.435	.325	**.913**	3.1	1.3	0.6	.0	3.3	
Career		116	82										

=== Domestic Leagues ===
Year	Team	League	GP	MPG	FG%	3P%	FT%	RPG	APG	SPG	BPG	PPG
2013	(Bulgaria) Rilski	NBL	21	29.1	.522	.359	.792	7.3	2.5	1.6	.0	13.2
2013–14	(Germany) Mitteldeutscher BC	BBL	34	31.3	.488	.345	.767	6.8	2.2	1.0	.2	14.3
2014–15	(Germany) Telekom Bonn	BBL	39	26.6	.502	.372	.751	4.2	1.5	1.2	.1	12.0
2015–16	(Spain) Obradoiro	ACB	34	30.2	.524	.330	.743	5.6	1.2	**2.0**	.2	11.5
2016–17	(Turkey) Büyükçekmece	BSL	30	29.5	.581	.413	.723	6.5	1.6	1.0	**.3**	11.9
2017–18	(Turkey) Banvit	BSL	35	31.2	.585	**.458**	.827	5.9	1.8	1.2	.1	13.1
2018–19	(Israel) Maccabi	IPL	33	16.5	.491	.371	.778	3.5	1.3	.7	.0	5.2
2023–24	(Japan) Osaka Evessa	B.League	51	29.5	.548	.385	.815	6.8	3.9	1.1	.1	17.2
2024–25	(Japan) Kyoto Hannaryz	B.League	**60**	**32.6**	.549	.380	.821	**7.8**	4.1	1.3	.2	17.5
2025–26	(Japan) Kyoto Hannaryz	B.League	35	29.2	**.588**	.361	**.903**	6.5	**5.1**	1.3	.2	**19.4**

Source: RealGM
