= Elias Harris =

German basketball player (born 1989)

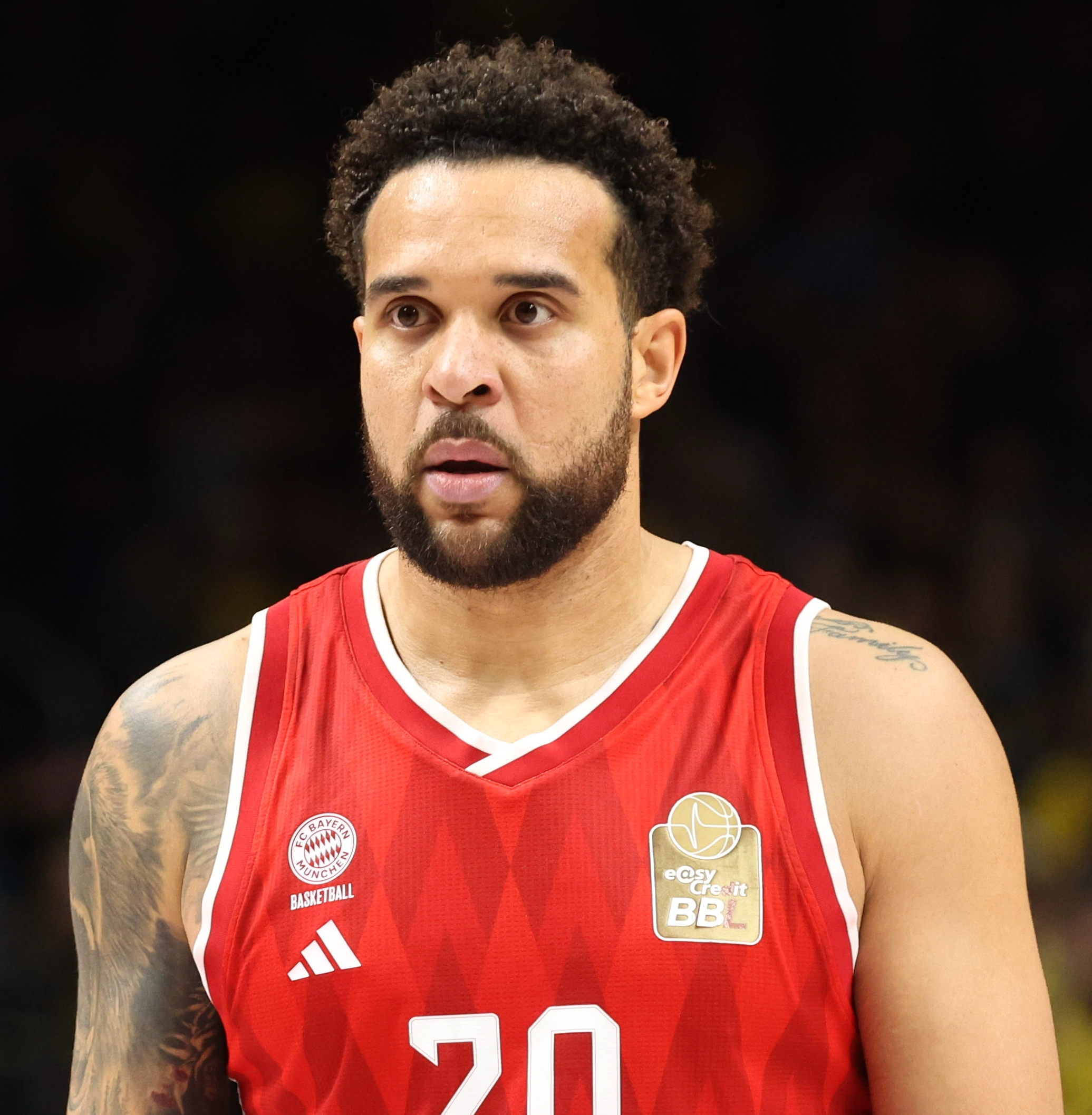
- Harris for Bayern Munich in 2025

Free agent
- Position: Power forward / center

Personal information
- Born: 6 July 1989 (age 37) Speyer, West Germany
- Listed height: 2.02 m (6 ft 8 in)
- Listed weight: 107 kg (236 lb)

Career information
- High school: Friedrich-Magnus-Schwerd-Gymnasium (Speyer, Germany)
- College: Gonzaga (2009–2013)
- NBA draft: 2013: undrafted
- Playing career: 2005–present

Career history
- 2005–2009: BIS Baskets Speyer
- 2013: Los Angeles Lakers
- 2013–2020: Brose Bamberg
- 2020–2021: Riesen Ludwigsburg
- 2021: Zaragoza
- 2021–2022: San-en NeoPhoenix
- 2022–2026: Bayern Munich

Career highlights
- 3× Bundesliga champion (2015–2017, 2024); 2× German Cup winner (2023, 2024); 3× First-team All-WCC (2010, 2012, 2013); WCC Newcomer of the Year (2010); WCC All-Freshman Team (2010)
- Stats at NBA.com
- Stats at Basketball Reference

Elias Harris (born 6 July 1989) is a German professional basketball player who last played for Bayern Munich of the Bundesliga (BBL) and the EuroLeague. He played college basketball for the Gonzaga Bulldogs and plays for the German national team.

== Junior career ==
Harris was one of the top junior players in Germany when he graduated from Friedrich-Magnus-Schwerd-Gymnasium in his hometown of Speyer, Germany. As a German junior, he spent four years playing for BIS Speyer in the German Pro B third division for four years, averaging 20.9 ppg and 9.2 rpg in 2008–09. He also competed with the German national junior basketball team at the 2005 FIBA Europe Under-16 Championship; 2006 and 2007 FIBA Europe Under-18 Championship; and 2008 and 2009 FIBA Europe Under-20 Championship.

== College career ==
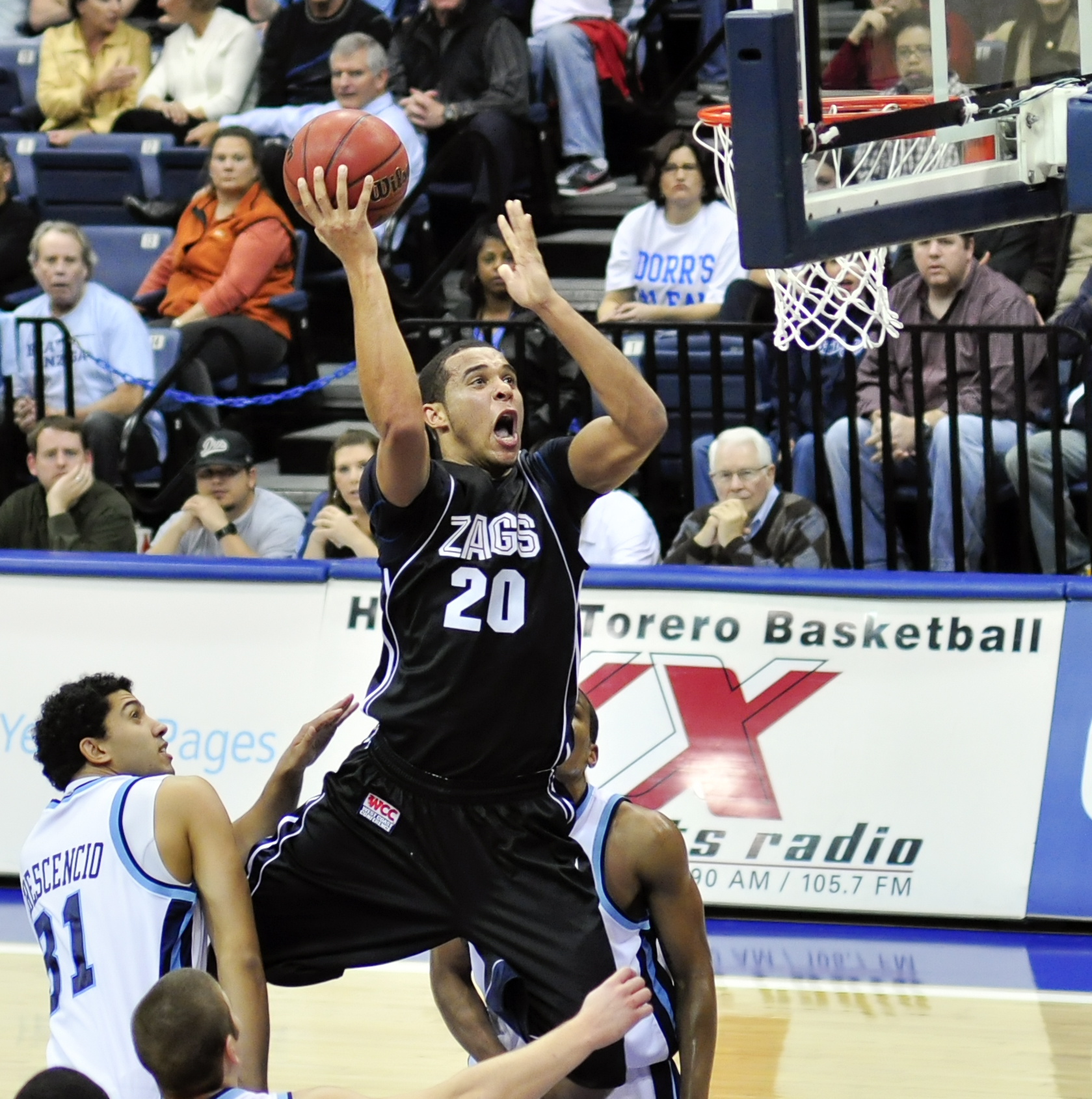
Harris playing for Gonzaga

Prior to the 2009–10 season, Harris committed to Gonzaga University to play NCAA Division I basketball. He immediately saw action with the Bulldogs despite being a freshman; in his second game of the season, against powerhouse #2-ranked Michigan State University, he scored a team-high 17 points and grabbed a team-high 9 rebounds in a narrow 75–71 loss.

== Professional career ==
After going undrafted in the 2013 NBA draft, Harris joined the Los Angeles Lakers for the 2013 NBA Summer League. He finished the summer league with averages of 10.2 points and 5.6 rebounds. On 14 August 2013, he signed a multi-year deal with the Lakers. During his rookie season, he had multiple assignments with the Los Angeles D-Fenders. On 29 November 2013, he was waived by the Lakers.

On 13 December 2013, he signed a two-year deal with Brose Bamberg of Germany and in April 2015 had his contract extended through the 2016–17 season. In March 2017, Harris signed a new deal with the Bamberg side, which kept him with the club until 2020.

In July 2014, Harris joined the Phoenix Suns for the 2014 NBA Summer League. In 2020, he did not have his contract renewed by the Bamberg team. During his seven years with the team, Harris won three German championships and two German Cup titles. He served as team captain.

On 23 September 2020, Harris signed with Riesen Ludwigsburg of the Basketball Bundesliga.

On 3 January 2021, he signed with Basket Zaragoza of the Liga ACB.

On July 12, 2022, he has signed with Bayern Munich of the Bundesliga (BBL). He parted ways with the Germans in August 2026.

== International career ==
Harris made his debut with the senior German national basketball team at the EuroBasket 2009. Although he was the second-youngest player on the team, he averaged 12 minutes per game while seeing action in all six games for the German squad.

== Personal life ==
Elias's father, Mike, is an African American former professional player who played basketball in Germany while his mother Svenja is a former Germany women's national basketball team player.

== Career statistics ==
Legend
GP	Games played	GS	Games started	MPG	Minutes per game
FG%	Field-goal percentage	3P%	3-point field-goal percentage	FT%	Free-throw percentage
RPG	Rebounds per game	APG	Assists per game	SPG	Steals per game
BPG	Blocks per game	PPG	Points per game	PIR	Performance index rating
**Bold**	Career high

=== NBA ===
Year	Team	GP	GS	MPG	FG%	3P%	FT%	RPG	APG	SPG	BPG	PPG
2013–14	L.A. Lakers	2	0	5.5	.000	—	—	.5	.5	.5	—	0.0
Career		2	0	5.5	.000	—	—	.5	.5	.5	—	0.0

=== EuroLeague ===
Year	Team	GP	GS	MPG	FG%	3P%	FT%	RPG	APG	SPG	BPG	PPG	PIR
2015–16	Bamberg	**20**	**8**	9.2	.571	.500	**.773**	2.4	.3	.2	—	4.6	4.4
2016–17	Bamberg	3	1	5.0	**.600**	—	.500	.3	—	.3	**.3**	2.3	1.7
2022–23	Bayern Munich	15	3	**14.1**	.509	—	.767	1.8	**.4**	.2	—	**5.1**	**5.1**
2023–24	Bayern Munich	14	0	10.1	.551	**1.000**	.750	**2.6**	**.4**	**.3**	—	4.9	5.0
Career		52	12	10.6	.547	.308	.757	2.2	.3	.2	.0	4.7	4.6

=== EuroCup ===
Year	Team	GP	GS	MPG	FG%	3P%	FT%	RPG	APG	SPG	BPG	PPG	PIR
2013–14	Bamberg	6	3	**20.8**	**.490**	**.267**	**.857**	**3.7**	**.8**	.3	**.2**	**10.0**	**8.8**
2014–15	Bamberg	**18**	**8**	15.9	.437	.100	.769	2.2	**.8**	**.7**	.1	5.2	4.9
Career		24	11	17.2	.459	.200	.783	2.6	.8	.6	.1	6.4	5.9

=== Basketball Champions League ===
Year	Team	GP	GS	MPG	FG%	3P%	FT%	RPG	APG	SPG	BPG	PPG
2018–19	Bamberg	**18**	4	18.3	**.586**	.400	.815	**3.8**	.7	.6	**.1**	9.8
2019–20	Bamberg	13	0	19.5	.417	.000	.773	3.5	1.1	.4	**.1**	8.0
2020–21	Zaragoza	9	**6**	**22.6**	.560	**.500**	**.844**	3.2	**1.8**	**.7**	—	**13.9**
Career		40	10	19.7	.526	.263	.811	3.6	1.1	.5	.1	10.1

=== Domestic leagues ===
Year	Team	League	GP	MPG	FG%	3P%	FT%	RPG	APG	SPG	BPG	PPG
2007–08	(Germany) Speyer	ProB	29	11.0	.488	.299	.656	8.7	.9	1.2	.9	20.5
2008–09	(Germany) Speyer	ProB	26	9.2	.483	.228	.783	9.2	1.7	1.6	1.0	20.9
2013–14	(United States) Los Angeles D-F.	NBDL	1	28.4	.600	.000	.857	2.0	2.0	—	1.0	18.0
2013–14	(Germany) Bamberg	BBL	25	21.2	.492	.377	.746	3.3	1.1	.5	.4	10.4
2014–15	(Germany) Bamberg	BBL	43	15.1	.575	.405	.680	2.9	.8	.4	.2	6.8
2015–16	(Germany) Bamberg	BBL	36	12.9	.676	.500	.824	2.4	.7	.3	.1	8.1
2016–17	(Germany) Bamberg	BBL	18	11.0	.632	.000	.837	2.7	.7	.2	.1	7.3
2017–18	(Germany) Bamberg	BBL	3	7.9	.667	—	1.000	1.0	.7	—	—	3.3
2018–19	(Germany) Bamberg	BBL	34	19.7	.639	.133	.781	3.6	1.3	.6	.4	10.6
2019–20	(Germany) Bamberg	BBL	26	19.2	.565	.385	.720	3.2	1.4	.3	.1	9.8
2020–21	(Germany) Riesen Ludwigsburg	BBL	11	24.0	.582	.000	.754	4.9	1.0	.8	.3	15.5
2020–21	(Germany) Riesen Ludwigsburg	BBL	11	24.0	.582	.000	.754	4.9	1.0	.8	.3	15.5
2020–21	(Spain) Zaragoza	ACB	19	22.8	.612	.400	.920	4.4	1.4	.6	.2	13.3
2021–22	(Japan) San-en NeoPhoenix	B.League	44	30.0	.512	.287	.705	6.6	2.4	1.0	.3	17.7
2022–23	(Germany) Bayern Munich	BBL	19	12.3	.562	.222	.719	2.2	.6	.4	.0	5.6
2023–24	(Germany) Bayern Munich	BBL	44	13.1	.620	.222	.885	2.7	1.0	.2	.1	6.5

=== College ===
Year	Team	GP	GS	MPG	FG%	3P%	FT%	RPG	APG	SPG	BPG	PPG
2009–10	Gonzaga	**34**	**34**	**29.4**	**.547**	**.451**	.676	7.1	1.1	.9	.5	**14.9**
2010–11	Gonzaga	**34**	33	26.0	.517	.353	**.772**	6.0	1.3	.6	.4	12.4
2011–12	Gonzaga	33	33	29.1	.502	.414	.672	**8.5**	1.2	.9	**.8**	13.1
2012–13	Gonzaga	**34**	33	27.8	.501	.170	.768	7.4	**1.6**	**1.2**	.6	14.6
Career		135	133	28.0	.517	.356	.723	7.3	1.3	.9	.5	13.8
