= 2011–12 Ole Miss Rebels men's basketball team =

American college basketball season

2011–12 Ole Miss Rebels men's basketball

NIT, First round
- Conference: Southeastern Conference
- Record: 20–14 (8–8 SEC)
- Head coach: Andy Kennedy
- Assistant coaches: Sergio Rouco; Al Pinkins; Bill Armstrong
- Home arena: Tad Smith Coliseum

2011–12 Southeastern Conference men's basketball standings
	Conf.				Overall
Team	W		L	PCT	W		L	PCT
No. 1 Kentucky	16	–	0	1.000	38	–	2	.950
No. 25 Florida	10	–	6	.625	26	–	11	.703
No. 20 Vanderbilt †	10	–	6	.625	25	–	11	.694
Tennessee	10	–	6	.625	19	–	15	.559
Alabama	9	–	7	.563	21	–	12	.636
Mississippi State	8	–	8	.500	21	–	12	.636
Ole Miss	8	–	8	.500	20	–	14	.588
LSU	7	–	9	.438	18	–	15	.545
Arkansas	6	–	10	.375	18	–	14	.563
Auburn	5	–	11	.313	15	–	16	.484
Georgia	5	–	11	.313	15	–	17	.469
South Carolina	2	–	14	.125	10	–	21	.323
† 2012 SEC tournament winner As of April 2, 2012; Rankings from AP poll

The 2011–12 Ole Miss Rebels men's basketball team represented the University of Mississippi in the sport of basketball during the 2011–12 college basketball season. The Rebels competed in Division I of the National Collegiate Athletic Association (NCAA) and the Southeastern Conference (SEC). They were led by head coach Andy Kennedy, and played their home games at Tad Smith Coliseum on the university's Oxford, Mississippi campus.

They were selected to play in the 2012 National Invitation Tournament as a #2 seed, where they were defeated by Illinois State in overtime.

== Previous season ==
The Rebels finished the 2010–11 season 20–14, 7–9 in SEC play and lost in the first round of the NIT to California.

== Roster ==
2011–12 Ole Miss Rebels men's basketball team
Players
Coaches

Pos.	#	Name	Height	Weight	Year	Hometown
F	1	Terrance Henry	6 ft 9 in (2.06 m)	210 lb (95 kg)	Sr	Monroe, Louisiana
G	3	Jamal Jones	6 ft 8 in (2.03 m)	185 lb (84 kg)	Fr	Searcy, Arkansas
G	4	Demarco Cox	6 ft 8 in (2.03 m)	276 lb (125 kg)	So	Yazoo City, Mississippi
G	10	LaDarius White	6 ft 6 in (1.98 m)	208 lb (94 kg)	Fr	McComb, Mississippi
G	12	Maurice Aniefiok	6 ft 5 in (1.96 m)	205 lb (93 kg)	Fr	Lagos, Nigeria
G	13	Dale Hughes	6 ft 2 in (1.88 m)	197 lb (89 kg)	RS Jr	Columbus, Mississippi
F	15	Steadman Short	6 ft 9 in (2.06 m)	230 lb (104 kg)	Sr	Simpsonville, South Carolina
G	20	Nick Williams	6 ft 4 in (1.93 m)	210 lb (95 kg)	RS Jr	Mobile, Alabama
F	22	Brock Shorter	6 ft 7 in (2.01 m)	216 lb (98 kg)	RS Jr	Coldwater, Mississippi
F	23	Reginald Buckner	6 ft 9 in (2.06 m)	225 lb (102 kg)	Jr	Memphis, Tennessee
G	24	Will Norman	6 ft 5 in (1.96 m)	206 lb (93 kg)	RS Fr	Lafayette, Louisiana
F	31	Murphy Holloway	6 ft 7 in (2.01 m)	240 lb (109 kg)	RS Jr	Irmo, South Carolina
G	32	Jarvis Summers	6 ft 4 in (1.93 m)	184 lb (83 kg)	Fr	Jackson, Mississippi
F	34	Aaron Jones	6 ft 8 in (2.03 m)	218 lb (99 kg)	Fr	Pascagoula, Mississippi
G	45	Jelan Kendrick	6 ft 7 in (2.01 m)	210 lb (95 kg)	RS Fr	Atlanta, GA

Head coach

- Andy Kennedy (UAB)

Assistant coach(es)

- Sergio Rouco (Nova Southeastern)
- Al Pinkins (NC State)
- Bill Armstrong (UAB)

Legend

- (C) Team captain
- (S) Suspended
- (I) Ineligible
- (W) Walk-on
- Injured
- Current redshirt

== Schedule ==
Date time, TV	Rank^{#}	Opponent^{#}	Result	Record	Site city, state
Exhibition
November 3, 2011*; 6:00 p.m.		North Alabama	W 91–62		Tad Smith Coliseum; Oxford, MS
Regular season
November 11, 2011*; 6:30 p.m.		Louisiana-Monroe	W 60–38	1–0	Tad Smith Coliseum; Oxford, MS
November 14, 2011*; 7:00 p.m.		Grambling State	W 69–39	2–0	Tad Smith Coliseum; Oxford, MS
November 18, 2011*; 2:30 p.m.		vs. Drake; 2011 Paradise Jam	W 63–59	3–0	Sports and Fitness Center; Saint Thomas, USVI
November 20, 2011*; 9:30 p.m., FSN		vs. No. 19 Marquette; 2011 Paradise Jam Semifinals	L 66–96	3–1	Sports and Fitness Center; Saint Thomas, USVI
November 21, 2011*; 6:30 p.m., FSN		vs. TCU; 2011 Paradise Jam	W 80–69	4–1	Sports and Fitness Center; Saint Thomas, USVI
November 25, 2011*; 3:00 p.m., FSN		Miami (FL)	W 64–61 ^{OT}	5–1	Tad Smith Coliseum; Oxford, MS
December 1, 2011*; 8:00 p.m., ESPNU		at DePaul; SEC–Big East Challenge	W 70–68	6–1	United Center; Chicago, IL
December 4, 2011*; 8:00 p.m., BTN		at Penn State	W 72–70	7–1	Bryce Jordan Center; University Park, PA
December 10, 2011*; 2:00 p.m.		Mississippi Valley State	W 80–56	8–1	Tad Smith Coliseum; Oxford, MS
December 14, 2011*; 6:00 p.m., CSS		Louisiana-Lafayette	W 66–54	9–1	Tad Smith Coliseum; Oxford, MS
December 17, 2011*; 3:30 p.m., FSN		at Southern Miss	L 82–86	9–2	Reed Green Coliseum; Hattiesburg, MS
December 21, 2011*; 8:00 p.m., FSN		vs. Middle Tennessee	L 56–68	9–3	DeSoto Civic Center; Southaven, MS
December 30, 2011*; 6:00 p.m.		at Dayton	L 50–62	9–4	UD Arena; Dayton, OH
January 3, 2012*; 8:00 p.m., FSN		SMU	W 50–48	10–4	Tad Smith Coliseum; Oxford, MS
SEC Regular Season
January 7, 2012; 12:30 p.m., SECN		at LSU	L 55–81	10–5 (0–1)	Maravich Assembly Center; Baton Rouge, LA
January 11, 2012; 7:00 p.m., SECN		Arkansas	W 71–63	11–5 (1–1)	Tad Smith Coliseum; Oxford, MS
January 14, 2012; 12:30 p.m., SECN		at Auburn	L 68–69 ^{2OT}	11–6 (1–2)	Auburn Arena; Auburn, AL
January 18, 2012; 8:00 p.m., CSS		No. 18 Mississippi State	W 75–68	12–6 (2–2)	Tad Smith Coliseum; Oxford, MS
January 21, 2012; 3:00 p.m., SECN		at Georgia	W 66–63	13–6 (3–2)	Stegeman Coliseum; Athens, GA
January 26, 2012; 6:00 p.m., ESPN2		No. 14 Florida	L 60–64	13–7 (3–3)	Tad Smith Coliseum; Oxford, MS
January 28, 2012; 6:00 p.m., FSN		South Carolina	W 66–62	14–7 (4–3)	Tad Smith Coliseum; Oxford, MS
February 4, 2012; 7:00 p.m., ESPN2		at Alabama	L 67–69 ^{2OT}	14–8 (4–4)	Coleman Coliseum; Tuscaloosa, AL
February 9, 2012; 6:00 p.m., ESPN2		at No. 20 Mississippi State	L 60–70	14–9 (4–5)	Humphrey Coliseum; Starkville, MS
February 11, 2012; 6:00 p.m., FSN		Auburn	W 61–54	15–9 (5–5)	Tad Smith Coliseum; Oxford, MS
February 16, 2012; 8:00 p.m., ESPN2		Vanderbilt	L 76–102	15–10 (5–6)	Tad Smith Coliseum; Oxford, MS
February 18, 2012; 3:30 p.m., SECN		at No. 1 Kentucky	L 62–77	15–11 (5–7)	Rupp Arena; Lexington, KY
February 22, 2012; 6:00 p.m., CSS		at Tennessee	L 60–73	15–12 (5–8)	Thompson-Boling Arena; Knoxville, TN
February 25, 2012; 12:30 p.m., SECN		LSU	W 72–48	16–12 (6–8)	Tad Smith Coliseum; Oxford, MS
February 28, 2012; 6:00 p.m., ESPNU		at Arkansas	W 77–75	17–12 (7–8)	Bud Walton Arena; Fayetteville, AR
March 3, 2012; 3:00 p.m., SECN		Alabama	W 60–51	18–12 (8–8)	Tad Smith Coliseum; Oxford, MS
SEC tournament
March 8, 2012; 6:30 p.m., SECN	No. (7)	vs. (10) Auburn; First Round	W 68–54	19–12	New Orleans Arena; New Orleans, LA
March 9, 2012; 7:30 p.m., SECN	No. (7)	vs. (2) Tennessee; Quarterfinals	W 77–72	20–12	New Orleans Arena; New Orleans, LA
March 9, 2012; 7:30 p.m., ABC	No. (7)	vs. (3) Vanderbilt; Semifinals	L 53–65	20–13	New Orleans Arena; New Orleans, LA
National Invitation Tournament
March 14, 2012; 8:30 p.m., ESPNU	No. (2 AZ)	No. (7 AZ) Illinois State; First Round	L 93–96 ^{OT}	20–14	Tad Smith Coliseum; Oxford, MS
*Non-conference game. ^{#}Rankings from AP Poll. (#) Tournament seedings in parentheses. All times are in Central.
