= 2011–12 Auburn Tigers men's basketball team =

American college basketball season

2011–12 Auburn Tigers men's basketball
- Conference: Southeastern Conference
- Record: 15–16 (5–11 SEC)
- Head coach: Tony Barbee (2nd season)
- Assistant coaches: Tony Madlock; Randall Dickey; Milt Wagner
- Captains: Kenny Gabriel; Frankie Sullivan
- Home arena: Auburn Arena

2011–12 Southeastern Conference men's basketball standings
	Conf.				Overall
Team	W		L	PCT	W		L	PCT
No. 1 Kentucky	16	–	0	1.000	38	–	2	.950
No. 25 Florida	10	–	6	.625	26	–	11	.703
No. 20 Vanderbilt †	10	–	6	.625	25	–	11	.694
Tennessee	10	–	6	.625	19	–	15	.559
Alabama	9	–	7	.563	21	–	12	.636
Mississippi State	8	–	8	.500	21	–	12	.636
Ole Miss	8	–	8	.500	20	–	14	.588
LSU	7	–	9	.438	18	–	15	.545
Arkansas	6	–	10	.375	18	–	14	.563
Auburn	5	–	11	.313	15	–	16	.484
Georgia	5	–	11	.313	15	–	17	.469
South Carolina	2	–	14	.125	10	–	21	.323
† 2012 SEC tournament winner As of April 2, 2012; Rankings from AP poll

The 2011–12 Auburn Tigers men's basketball team represented Auburn University in the sport of basketball during the 2011–12 college basketball season. The Tigers competed in Division I of the National Collegiate Athletic Association (NCAA) and the Southeastern Conference (SEC). They were led by head coach Tony Barbee, and played their home games at Auburn Arena on the university's Auburn, Alabama campus.

== Previous season ==
The Tigers finished the 2010–11 season 11–20 overall, 4–12 in SEC play and lost in the first round of the SEC tournament to Georgia.

== Roster ==
2011–12 Auburn Tigers men's basketball team
Players
Coaches

Pos.	#	Name	Height	Weight	Year	Hometown
G	0	Josh Langford	6 ft 7 in (2.01 m)	209 lb (95 kg)	So	Huntsville, Alabama
G	1	Varez Ward	6 ft 2 in (1.88 m)	208 lb (94 kg)	RS So	Montgomery, Alabama
F	3	Allen Payne	6 ft 6 in (1.98 m)	210 lb (95 kg)	So	Cincinnati, Ohio
F	3	Chris Denson	6 ft 2 in (1.88 m)	172 lb (78 kg)	So	Columbus, Georgia
G	4	Cedrick McAfee	6 ft 3 in (1.91 m)	175 lb (79 kg)	Fr	Memphis, Tennessee
G	5	Bernard Morena	6 ft 8 in (2.03 m)	190 lb (86 kg)	Fr	Abidjan, Ivory Coast
G	11	Josh Wallace	5 ft 10 in (1.78 m)	170 lb (77 kg)	Jr	Pensacola, Florida
G	15	Tony Neysmith	6 ft 5 in (1.96 m)	217 lb (98 kg)	Sr	Norcross, Georgia
F	22	Kenny Gabriel	6 ft 8 in (2.03 m)	208 lb (94 kg)	Sr	Charlotte, North Carolina
G	23	Frankie Sullivan	6 ft 1 in (1.85 m)	206 lb (93 kg)	RS Jr	Uniontown, Alabama
G	24	T. J. Rice	5 ft 9 in (1.75 m)	160 lb (73 kg)	So	Alpharetta, Georgia
F	25	Jake Drum	6 ft 5 in (1.96 m)	253 lb (115 kg)	Sr	Hoover, Alabama
G	32	Noel Johnson	6 ft 6 in (1.98 m)	200 lb (91 kg)	RS So	Fayetteville, Georgia
C	41	Rob Chubb	6 ft 10 in (2.08 m)	242 lb (110 kg)	Jr	Peachtree City, Georgia
G	44	Dylan Spencer	6 ft 4 in (1.93 m)	190 lb (86 kg)	Jr	Birmingham, Alabama
F	45	Adrian Forbes	6 ft 8 in (2.03 m)	232 lb (105 kg)	Sr	Spanish Town, Jamaica
C	50	Willy Kouassi	6 ft 10 in (2.08 m)	219 lb (99 kg)	Fr	Abidjan, Ivory Coast

Head coach

- Tony Barbee (UMass)

Assistant coach(es)

- Tony Madlock (Memphis)
- Randall Dickey (Ouachita Baptist)
- Milt Wagner (Louisville)

Legend

- (C) Team captain
- (S) Suspended
- (I) Ineligible
- (W) Walk-on
- Injured
- Current redshirt

== Schedule ==
Date time, TV	Rank^{#}	Opponent^{#}	Result	Record	Site city, state
Exhibition
November 1, 2011; 7:00 p.m.		Paine	W 86–60	–	Auburn Arena; Auburn, AL
November 5, 2011; 7:00 p.m.		Victory	W 83–47	–	Auburn Arena; Auburn, AL
Regular Season
November 11, 2011*; 7:00 p.m.		McNeese State	W 84–62	1–0	Auburn Arena; Auburn, AL
November 14, 2011*; 7:00 p.m.		Kennesaw State	W 68–55	2–0	Auburn Arena; Auburn, AL
November 25, 2011*; 7:00 p.m.		Nicholls State	W 78–57	3–0	Auburn Arena; Auburn, AL
November 28, 2011*; 7:00 p.m.		Arkansas–Pine Bluff	W 72–59	4–0	Auburn Arena; Auburn, AL
December 2, 2011*; 8:00 p.m., ESPNU		at Seton Hall; SEC–Big East Challenge	L 59–81	4–1	Prudential Center; Newark, NJ
December 14, 2011*; 8:30 p.m., CSS		South Florida	W 52–40	5–1	Auburn Arena; Auburn, AL
December 17, 2011*; 7:00 p.m.		North Florida	W 84–71	6–1	Auburn Arena; Auburn, AL
December 19, 2011*; 7:00 p.m.		Florida A&M	W 76–69	7–1	Auburn Arena; Auburn, AL
December 23, 2011*; 12:00 a.m., ESPNU		vs. Hawaii; Diamond Head Classic quarterfinals	W 65–62	8–1	Stan Sheriff Center; Honolulu, HI
December 23, 2011*; 10:00 p.m., ESPN2		vs. Long Beach State; Diamond Head Classic semifinals	L 43–64	8–2	Stan Sheriff Center; Honolulu, HI
December 25, 2011*; 6:30 p.m., ESPN2		vs. UTEP; Diamond Head Classic consolation	L 76–83	8–3	Stan Sheriff Center; Honolulu, HI
December 30, 2011*; 6:00 p.m.		Georgia Southern	W 78–75	9–3	Auburn Arena; Auburn, AL
January 2, 2012*; 7:00 p.m.		Bethune–Cookman	W 67–41	10–3	Auburn Arena; Auburn, AL
January 4, 2012*; 6:00 p.m., ESPN3		at Florida State	L 56–85	10–4	Donald L. Tucker Center; Tallahassee, FL
January 7, 2012; 1:30 p.m., SECN		at Vanderbilt	L 35–65	10–5 (0–1)	Memorial Gym; Nashville, TN
January 11, 2012; 8:00 p.m., SECN		No. 2 Kentucky	L 53–68	10–6 (0–2)	Auburn Arena; Auburn, AL
January 14, 2012; 1:30 p.m., SECN		Ole Miss	W 69–68 ^{2OT}	11–6 (1–2)	Auburn Arena; Auburn, AL
January 17, 2012; 7:00 p.m., ESPNU		at LSU	L 58–65 ^{OT}	11–7 (1–3)	Maravich Assembly Center; Baton Rouge, LA
January 21, 2012; 1:30 p.m., SECN		South Carolina	W 63–52	12–7 (2–3)	Auburn Arena; Auburn, AL
January 25, 2012; 9:00 p.m., CSS		at Arkansas	L 53–56	12–8 (2–4)	Bud Walton Arena; Fayetteville, AR
January 28, 2012; 6:00 p.m., ESPN2		at Tennessee	L 49–64	12–9 (2–5)	Thompson-Boling Arena; Knoxville, TN
February 1, 2012; 8:00 p.m., SECN		Georgia	W 59–51	13–9 (3–5)	Auburn Arena; Auburn, AL
February 4, 2012; 4:00 p.m., SECN		at No. 22 Mississippi State	L 88–91	13–10 (3–6)	Humphrey Coliseum; Starkville, MS
February 7, 2012; 9:00 p.m., ESPNU		Alabama	L 50–68	13–11 (3–7)	Auburn Arena; Auburn, AL
February 11, 2012; 7:00 p.m., FSN		at Ole Miss	L 54–61	13–12 (3–8)	Tad Smith Coliseum; Oxford, MS
February 18, 2012; 8:00 p.m., FSN		Mississippi State	W 65–55	14–12 (4–8)	Auburn Arena; Auburn, AL
February 21, 2012; 7:00 p.m., ESPNU		at No. 12 Florida	L 47–63	14–13 (4–9)	O'Connell Center; Gainesville, FL
February 25, 2012; 4:00 p.m., SECN		Arkansas	L 71–77	14–14 (4–10)	Auburn Arena; Auburn, AL
February 29, 2012; 8:00 p.m., SECN		at Alabama	L 49–55	14–15 (4–11)	Coleman Coliseum; Tuscaloosa, AL
March 3, 2012; 2:00 p.m., CBS		LSU	W 67–52	15–15 (5–11)	Auburn Arena; Auburn, AL
SEC Tournament
March 8, 2012; 12:00 p.m., SECN	(10)	vs. (7) Ole Miss; First Round	L 54–68	15–16	New Orleans Arena; New Orleans, LA
*Non-conference game. ^{#}Rankings from AP Poll. (#) Tournament seedings in parentheses. All times are in Central Time Zone.
