= 2012 SEC men's basketball tournament =

- Classification: Division I
- Season: 2011–12
- Teams: 12
- Site: New Orleans Arena; New Orleans, Louisiana
- Champions: Vanderbilt (2nd title)
- Winning coach: Kevin Stallings (1st title)
- MVP: John Jenkins (Vanderbilt)
- Attendance: 154,526
- Television: SEC Network (syndicated, first two rounds); ABC (semifinals and final)

2011–12 Southeastern Conference men's basketball standings
	Conf.				Overall
Team	W		L	PCT	W		L	PCT
No. 1 Kentucky	16	–	0	1.000	38	–	2	.950
No. 25 Florida	10	–	6	.625	26	–	11	.703
No. 20 Vanderbilt †	10	–	6	.625	25	–	11	.694
Tennessee	10	–	6	.625	19	–	15	.559
Alabama	9	–	7	.563	21	–	12	.636
Mississippi State	8	–	8	.500	21	–	12	.636
Ole Miss	8	–	8	.500	20	–	14	.588
LSU	7	–	9	.438	18	–	15	.545
Arkansas	6	–	10	.375	18	–	14	.563
Auburn	5	–	11	.313	15	–	16	.484
Georgia	5	–	11	.313	15	–	17	.469
South Carolina	2	–	14	.125	10	–	21	.323
† 2012 SEC tournament winner As of April 2, 2012; Rankings from AP poll

The 2012 SEC men's basketball tournament was the postseason men's basketball tournament for the Southeastern Conference held from March 8–11, 2012 in New Orleans at the New Orleans Arena.

== Tournament notes ==
This was also the first year teams were seeded #1 through #12, as the conference eliminated divisional play prior to the season, although the 2011–12 schedule was still structured based upon the divisions used from 1991–92 through 2010–11.

This was the last SEC tournament to have 12 teams. The addition of Missouri and Texas A&M from the Big 12 Conference had been announced prior to the season.

== Television coverage ==
The first round and quarterfinal rounds were televised through the ESPN Regional Television-operated SEC Network through regional syndication. The semifinals and final were broadcast nationally on ABC.

== Seeds ==
As of completed games on March 4. Applies tiebreaker as best as possible.

2012 SEC Men's Basketball Tournament seeds
Seed	School	Conf.	Over.	Tiebreaker
1.	Kentucky ‡ †	16–0	30–1	
2.	Tennessee †	10–6	18–13	1–1 vs VAN; 2–0 vs FLA; Total 3–1
3.	Vanderbilt †	10–6	21–10	1–1 vs TEN; 1–1 vs FLA; Total 2–2
4.	Florida †	10–6	22–9	1–1 vs VAN; 0–2 vs TEN; Total 1–3
5.	Alabama	9–7	20–10	
6.	Mississippi State	8–8	21–10	1–1 vs MISS; 1–0 vs TEN
7.	Ole Miss	8–8	18–12	1–1 vs MSU; 0–1 vs TEN
8.	LSU	7–9	17–13	
9.	Arkansas	6–10	18–13	
10.	Auburn	5–11	15–15	1–0 vs UGA
11.	Georgia	5–11	14–16	0–1 vs AUB
12.	South Carolina	2–14	10–20	
‡ – SEC regular season champions, and tournament No. 1 seed. † – Received a bye in the conference tournament. Overall records are as of the end of the regular season.

== Schedule ==
Session	Game	Time*	Matchup^{#}	Television	Attendance
First Round - Thursday, March 8
1	1	12:00 PM	#8 LSU vs. #9 Arkansas	SEC Network	10,703
1	2	2:30 PM	#5 Alabama vs. #12 South Carolina	SEC Network	10,703
2	3	6:30 PM	#7 Ole Miss vs. #10 Auburn	SEC Network	10,197
2	4	9:00 PM	#6 Mississippi State vs. #11 Georgia	SEC Network	10,197
Quarterfinals - Friday, March 9
3	5	12:00 PM	#1 Kentucky vs. #8 LSU	SEC Network	18,207
3	6	2:30 PM	#4 Florida vs. #5 Alabama	SEC Network	18,207
4	7	6:30 PM	#2 Tennessee vs. #7 Ole Miss	SEC Network	10,526
4	8	9:00 PM	#3 Vanderbilt vs. #11 Georgia	SEC Network	10,526
Semifinals - Saturday, March 10
5	9	12:00 PM	#1 Kentucky vs. #4 Florida	ABC	18,523
5	10	2:30 PM	#7 Ole Miss vs. #3 Vanderbilt	ABC	18,523
Championship Game - Sunday, March 11
6	11	12:00 PM	#1 Kentucky vs. #3 Vanderbilt	ABC	18,114
*Game Times in CT. #-Rankings denote tournament seeding.

== Bracket ==
First round March 8, 2012; SEC Network
8	LSU	70
9	Arkansas	54
5	Alabama	63
12	South Carolina	57
7	Ole Miss	68
10	Auburn	54
6	Mississippi State	61
11	Georgia	71

Quarterfinals; March 9, 2012; SEC Network
1	#1 Kentucky	60
8	LSU	51
4	#22 Florida	66
5	Alabama	63
2	Tennessee	72
7	Ole Miss	77^{OT}
3	Vanderbilt	63
11	Georgia	41

Semifinals; March 10, 2012; ABC
1	#1 Kentucky	74
4	#22 Florida	71
7	Ole Miss	53
3	Vanderbilt	65

Championship Game; March 11, 2012; ABC
1	#1 Kentucky	64
3	Vanderbilt	71

== SEC All-tournament team ==
- John Jenkins, Vanderbilt MVP
- Erik Murphy, Florida
- Bradley Beal, Florida
- Terrence Jones, Kentucky
- Anthony Davis, Kentucky
- Lance Goulbourne, Vanderbilt
