= 2011–12 California Golden Bears men's basketball team =

American college basketball season

2011–12 California Golden Bears men's basketball

NCAA tournament, First Four
- Conference: Pac-12 Conference
- Record: 24–10 (13–5 Pac-12)
- Head coach: Mike Montgomery
- Assistant coaches: Jay John; Travis DeCuire; John Montgomery
- Home arena: Haas Pavilion

2011–12 Pac-12 Conference men's basketball standings
	Conf.				Overall
Team	W		L	PCT	W		L	PCT
Washington	14	–	4	.778	24	–	11	.686
California	13	–	5	.722	24	–	10	.706
Oregon	13	–	5	.722	24	–	10	.706
Arizona	12	–	6	.667	23	–	12	.657
Colorado †	11	–	7	.611	24	–	12	.667
UCLA	11	–	7	.611	19	–	14	.576
Stanford	10	–	8	.556	26	–	11	.703
Oregon State	7	–	11	.389	21	–	15	.583
Washington State	7	–	11	.389	19	–	18	.514
Arizona State	6	–	12	.333	10	–	21	.323
Utah	3	–	15	.167	6	–	25	.194
USC	1	–	17	.056	6	–	26	.188
† Conference tournament winner As of March 8, 2012; Rankings from AP poll

The 2011–12 California Golden Bears men's basketball team represented the University of California, Berkeley in the 2011–12 NCAA Division I men's basketball season. This was head coach Mike Montgomery's fourth season at California. The Golden Bears played their home games at Haas Pavilion and were members of the Pac-12 Conference. They finished with a record of 24–10 overall, 13–5 in Pac-12 play. They lost in the semifinals of the 2012 Pac-12 Conference men's basketball tournament to Colorado. They earned a 12th seed at the 2012 NCAA Division I men's basketball tournament, where they lost in the First Four to South Florida.

== Roster ==
#	Name	Height	Weight (lbs.)	Position	Class	Hometown	Previous team(s)
1	Justin Cobbs	6'2"	195	G	RS So.	Los Angeles, CA, U.S.	Minnesota
2	Jorge Gutierrez	6'3"	195	G	Sr.	Chihuahua, Mexico	Findlay Prep
3	Richard Solomon	6'10"	220	F	So.	Los Angeles, CA, U.S.	Price HS
10	Alex Rossi	6'6"	200	G	RS Fr.	Winnetka, IL, U.S.	New Trier HS
12	Brandon Smith	5'11"	185	G	Jr.	San Ramon, CA, U.S.	De La Salle HS
13	Raffi Chalian	5'11"	165	G	Fr.	Whittier, CA, U.S.	Sonora HS
14	Christian Behrens	6'9"	230	F	Fr.	Kent, WA, U.S.	Tahoma Sr. HS
15	Bak Bak	6'9"	225	F	Jr.	Sun Valley, CA, U.S.	Village Christian HS
20	Rob Filley	6'4"	195	G	Fr.	Santa Ana, CA, U.S.	Foothill HS
21	Jeff Powers	6'7"	220	G	So.	Clayton, CA, U.S.	Denver
22	Harper Kamp	6'8"	245	F	Sr.	Mesa, AZ, U.S.	Mountain View HS
23	Allen Crabbe	6'6"	205	G	So.	Los Angeles, CA, U.S.	Price HS
24	Ricky Kreklow	6'6"	220	G	So.	Columbia, MO, U.S.	Missouri
31	Emerson Murray	6'3"	195	G	So.	Vancouver, BC, CAN	St. George's School
34	Robert Thurman	6'10"	270	F	Jr.	North Edwards, CA, U.S.	Norwich
45	David Kravish	6'9"	210	F	Fr.	Lee's Summit, MO	Lee's Summit North HS

=== Coaching staff ===
Name	Position	Year at Cal	Alma mater (year)
Mike Montgomery	Head coach	4th	Colorado State (1976)
Jay John	Assistant coach	4th	Arizona (1981)
Travis DeCuire	Assistant coach	4th	Montana (1994)
John Montgomery	Assistant coach	4th	Loyola Marymount (2007)
Gregg Gottlieb	Director of basketball operations	5th	UCLA (1995)

== Schedule and results ==
- All times are Pacific.

Date time, TV	Rank^{#}	Opponent^{#}	Result	Record	Site (attendance) city, state
Exhibition
11/01/2011*; 7:30 pm	No. 24	UC San Diego	W 88–53	–	Haas Pavilion (1,818); Berkeley, CA
Regular season
11/11/2011*; 7:30 pm	No. 24	UC Irvine	W 77–56	1–0	Haas Pavilion (5,305); Berkeley, CA
11/13/2011*; 6:30 pm, ESPNU	No. 24	George Washington; Progressive CBE Classic I	W 81–54	2–0	Haas Pavilion (6,709); Berkeley, CA
11/15/2011*; 7:00 pm, ESPN2	No. 23	Austin Peay; Progressive CBE Classic II	W 72–55	3–0	Haas Pavilion (6,369); Berkeley, CA
11/21/2011*; 7:00 pm, ESPN2	No. 20	vs. Georgia; Progressive CBE Classic Semifinals	W 70–46	4–0	Sprint Center (11,436); Kansas City, MO
11/22/2011*; 7:00 pm, ESPN2	No. 20	vs. No. 21 Missouri; Progressive CBE Classic Championship	L 53–92	4–1	Sprint Center (10,747); Kansas City, MO
11/26/2011*; 2:00 pm	No. 20	Denver	W 80–59	5–1	Haas Pavilion (7,324); Berkeley, CA
11/28/2011*; 7:30 pm	No. 24	McNeese State	W 73–57	6–1	Haas Pavilion (6,407); Berkeley, CA
12/04/2011*; 2:00 pm, The Mtn.	No. 24	at San Diego State	L 63–64	6–2	Viejas Arena (12,414); San Diego, CA
12/07/2011*; 7:30 pm		San Jose State	W 81–36	7–2	Haas Pavilion (7,461); Berkeley, CA
12/11/2011*; 2:00 pm		Jackson State	W 73–46	8–2	Haas Pavilion (7,856); Berkeley, CA
12/16/2011*; 7:30 pm		Weber State	W 77–57	9–2	Haas Pavilion (7,987); Berkeley, CA
12/19/2011*; 7:30 pm		UC Santa Barbara	W 70–50	10–2	Haas Pavilion (9,876); Berkeley, CA
12/23/2011*; 2:00 pm, CBSSN		at No. 21 UNLV	L 68–85	10–3	Thomas & Mack Center (15,188); Paradise, NV
12/29/2011; 6:00 pm, CSNCA		USC	W 53–49	11–3 (1–0)	Haas Pavilion (9,447); Berkeley, CA
12/31/2011; 1:00 pm, FSN		UCLA	W 85–69	12–3 (2–0)	Haas Pavilion (9,750); Berkeley, CA
01/05/2012; 7:00 pm		at Oregon State	L 85–92	12–4 (2–1)	Gill Coliseum (5,162); Corvallis, OR
01/08/2012; 4:30 pm, FSN		at Oregon	W 77–60	13–4 (3–1)	Matthew Knight Arena (7,415); Eugene, OR
01/12/2012; 8:00 pm, CSNCA		Colorado	W 57–50	14–4 (4–1)	Haas Pavilion (7,577); Berkeley, CA
01/14/2012; 7:30 pm, CSNCA		Utah	W 81–45	15–4 (5–1)	Haas Pavilion (7,457); Berkeley, CA
01/19/2012; 5:30 pm		at Washington	W 69–66	16–4 (6–1)	Alaska Airlines Arena (9,591); Seattle, WA
01/21/2012; 3:05 pm		at Washington State	L 75–77	16–5 (6–2)	Beasley Coliseum (5,013); Pullman, WA
01/29/2012; 5:30 pm, FSN		Stanford	W 69–59	17–5 (7–2)	Haas Pavilion (11,877); Berkeley, CA
02/02/2012; 8:00 pm, FSN		Arizona	L 74–78	17–6 (7–3)	Haas Pavilion (9,690); Berkeley, CA
02/04/2012; 2:00 pm, CSNCA		Arizona State	W 68–47	18–6 (8–3)	Haas Pavilion (8,859); Berkeley, CA
02/09/2012; 7:30 pm		at USC	W 75–49	19–6 (9–3)	Galen Center (3,707); Los Angeles, CA
02/11/2012; 1:00 pm, FSN		at UCLA	W 73–63	20–6 (10–3)	LA Sports Arena (9,001 ) Los Angeles, CA
02/16/2012; 7:30 pm, CSNCA		Oregon	W 86–83	21–6 (11–3)	Haas Pavilion (9,980 ) Berkeley, CA
02/18/2012; 7:00 pm, CSNCA		Oregon State	W 77–63	22–6 (12–3)	Haas Pavilion (11,331 ) Berkeley, CA
02/23/2012; 6:00 pm		at Utah	W 60–46	23–6 (13–3)	Jon M. Huntsman Center (8,426); Salt Lake City, UT
02/26/2012; 2:30 pm, FSN		at Colorado	L 57–70	23–7 (13–4)	Coors Events Center (11,043); Boulder, CO
03/04/2012; 2:30 pm, FSN		at Stanford	L 70–75	23–8 (13–5)	Maples Pavilion (6,899); Stanford, CA
Pac-12 Tournament
03/08/2012; 6:10 pm, FSN	(2)	vs. (7) Stanford; Quarterfinals	W 77–71	24–8	Staples Center (9,317); Los Angeles, CA
03/09/2012; 8:40 pm, FSN	(2)	vs. (6) Colorado; Semifinals	L 59–70	24–9	Staples Center (11,615); Los Angeles, CA
NCAA Tournament
03/14/2012*; 6:17 pm, truTV	(12)	vs. (12) South Florida; First Four	L 54–65	24–10	UD Arena (7,218); Dayton, OH
*Non-conference game. ^{#}Rankings from AP Poll. (#) Tournament seedings in parentheses. All times are in Pacific Time (#) during NCAA Tournament is seed with Region.

== Notes ==
- March 5, 2012 – Senior guard Jorge Gutierrez was named the 2011–12 Pac-12 Men's Basketball Player of the Year and Pac-12 Defensive Player of the Year.
