= 2011–12 South Carolina Gamecocks men's basketball team =

American college basketball season

2011–12 South Carolina Gamecocks men's basketball
- Conference: Southeastern Conference
- Record: 10–21 (2–14 SEC)
- Head coach: Darrin Horn (4th season)
- Assistant coaches: Neill Berry; Mike Boynton Jr; Cypheus Bunton
- Home arena: Colonial Life Arena

2011–12 Southeastern Conference men's basketball standings
	Conf.				Overall
Team	W		L	PCT	W		L	PCT
No. 1 Kentucky	16	–	0	1.000	38	–	2	.950
No. 25 Florida	10	–	6	.625	26	–	11	.703
No. 20 Vanderbilt †	10	–	6	.625	25	–	11	.694
Tennessee	10	–	6	.625	19	–	15	.559
Alabama	9	–	7	.563	21	–	12	.636
Mississippi State	8	–	8	.500	21	–	12	.636
Ole Miss	8	–	8	.500	20	–	14	.588
LSU	7	–	9	.438	18	–	15	.545
Arkansas	6	–	10	.375	18	–	14	.563
Auburn	5	–	11	.313	15	–	16	.484
Georgia	5	–	11	.313	15	–	17	.469
South Carolina	2	–	14	.125	10	–	21	.323
† 2012 SEC tournament winner As of April 2, 2012; Rankings from AP poll

The 2011–12 South Carolina Gamecocks men's basketball team represented the University of South Carolina in the sport of basketball during the 2011–12 NCAA Division I men's basketball season. The Gamecocks competed in the Eastern Division of the Southeastern Conference (SEC). They played their home games in the Colonial Life Arena on the university's Columbia, South Carolina campus.

On March 13, 2012, head coach Darrin Horn was fired after four seasons with the Gamecocks. Horn compiled a 60–63 overall record and a 23–45 SEC record during his tenure.

== Previous season ==
The Gamecocks finished the 2010–11 season 14–16 overall, 2–14 in SEC play and lost in the first round of the SEC tournament to Ole Miss.

== Roster ==
2011–12 South Carolina Gamecocks men's basketball team
Players
Coaches

Pos.	#	Name	Height	Weight	Year	Hometown
G	1	Brenton Williams	5 ft 11 in (1.8 m)	172 lb (78 kg)	So	Kissimmee, Florida
G	2		6 ft 4 in (1.93 m)	171 lb (78 kg)	So	Wilson, North Carolina
G	5	Eric Smith	5 ft 11 in (1.8 m)	210 lb (95 kg)	So	Mullins, South Carolina
G	12	Shane Phillips	5 ft 10 in (1.78 m)	170 lb (77 kg)	Jr	Wheeling, West Virginia
F	13	Anthony Gill	6 ft 8 in (2.03 m)	235 lb (107 kg)	Fr	Charlotte, North Carolina
F	15	Malik Cooke	6 ft 6 in (1.98 m)	215 lb (98 kg)	RS Sr	Charlotte, North Carolina
G	23	Bruce Ellington	5 ft 9 in (1.75 m)	197 lb (89 kg)	So	Moncks Corner, South Carolina
F	24	Damontre Harris	6 ft 9 in (2.06 m)	226 lb (103 kg)	So	Fayetteville, North Carolina
F	30	Lakeem Jackson	6 ft 5 in (1.96 m)	238 lb (108 kg)	Jr	Charlotte, North Carolina
G	32	Damien Leonard	6 ft 4 in (1.93 m)	192 lb (87 kg)	Fr	Greenville, South Carolina
F	33	RJ Slawson	6 ft 8 in (2.03 m)	207 lb (94 kg)	So	Charleston, South Carolina
F	35	Alex Irwin	6 ft 4 in (1.93 m)	170 lb (77 kg)	Jr	Richmond, Virginia
F	45	Carlton Geathers	6 ft 10 in (2.08 m)	250 lb (113 kg)	RS Fr	Georgetown, South Carolina

Head coach

- Darrin Horn (Western Kentucky)

Assistant coach(es)

- Neill Berry (Southeastern Louisiana)
- Mike Boynton Jr. (South Carolina)
- Cypheus Bunton (Western Kentucky)

Legend

- (C) Team captain
- (S) Suspended
- (I) Ineligible
- (W) Walk-on
- Injured
- Current redshirt

== Schedule ==
Date time, TV	Rank^{#}	Opponent^{#}	Result	Record	Site city, state
Exhibition
November 3, 2011*; 7:00 p.m., SportSouth		Kentucky Wesleyan	W 69–59		Colonial Life Arena; Columbia, SC
Regular season
November 11, 2011*; 7:00 p.m., SportSouth		Western Carolina	W 75–50	1–0	Colonial Life Arena; Columbia, SC
November 15, 2011*; 7:00 p.m., SportSouth		at Elon	L 53–58	1–1	Alumni Gym; Elon, NC
November 20, 2011*; 6:00 p.m., SportSouth		Tennessee State; Las Vegas Invitational	L 63–64	1–2	Colonial Life Arena; Columbia, SC
November 22, 2011*; 7:00 p.m., SportSouth		Mississippi Valley State; Las Vegas Invitational	W 61–57	2–2	Colonial Life Arena; Columbia, SC
November 25, 2011*; 10:00 p.m., ESPN2		vs. No. 1 North Carolina; Las Vegas Invitational	L 62–87	2–3	Orleans Arena; Paradise, NV
November 26, 2011*; 7:30 p.m., ESPN2		vs. USC; Las Vegas Invitational	L 60–63	2–4	Orleans Arena; Paradise, NV
December 1, 2011*; 7:00 p.m., ESPNU		Providence; SEC–Big East Challenge	L 67–76	2–5	Colonial Life Arena; Columbia, SC
December 4, 2011*; 3:30 p.m., ESPNU		at Clemson	W 58–55	3–5	Littlejohn Coliseum; Clemson, SC
December 13, 2011*; 7:00 p.m., SportSouth		Presbyterian	W 66–58	4–5	Colonial Life Arena; Columbia, SC
December 17, 2011*; 12:00 p.m., ESPN		No. 2 Ohio State	L 66–74	4–6	Colonial Life Arena; Columbia, SC
December 21, 2011*; 7:00 p.m., SportSouth		Southeastern Louisiana	W 62–43	5–6	Colonial Life Arena; Columbia, SC
December 28, 2011*; 7:00 p.m., CSS		Wofford	W 57–45	6–6	Colonial Life Arena; Columbia, SC
December 31, 2011*; 12:00 p.m., SportSouth		USC Upstate	W 72–66	7–6	Colonial Life Arena; Columbia, SC
January 3, 2012*; 7:00 p.m.		South Carolina State	W 79–51	8–6	Colonial Life Arena; Columbia, SC
SEC Regular Season
January 7, 2012; 4:00 p.m., SECN		at No. 2 Kentucky	L 64–79	8–7 (0–1)	Rupp Arena; Lexington, KY
January 10, 2012; 9:00 p.m., ESPNU		Vanderbilt	L 57–67	8–8 (0–2)	Colonial Life Arena; Columbia, SC
January 14, 2012; 7:00 p.m., CSS		No. 19 Florida	L 65–79	8–9 (0–3)	Colonial Life Arena; Columbia, SC
January 21, 2012; 4:00 p.m., SECN		at Auburn	L 52–63	8–10 (0–4)	Auburn Arena; Auburn, AL
January 25, 2012; 8:00 p.m., SECN		Alabama	W 56–54	9–10 (1–4)	Colonial Life Arena; Columbia, SC
January 28, 2012; 7:00 p.m., FSN		at Ole Miss	L 62–66	9–11 (1–5)	Tad Smith Coliseum; Oxford, MS
February 2, 2012; 9:00 p.m., ESPN2		at No. 12 Florida	L 66–74	9–12 (1–6)	O'Connell Center; Gainesville, FL
February 4, 2012; 6:00 p.m., ESPN		No. 1 Kentucky	L 52–86	9–13 (1–7)	Colonial Life Arena; Columbia, SC
February 8, 2012; 8:00 p.m., SECN		at Tennessee	L 57–69	9–14 (1–8)	Thompson-Boling Arena; Knoxville, TN
February 11, 2012; 1:30 p.m., SECN		at Arkansas	L 65–76	9–15 (1–9)	Bud Walton Arena; Fayetteville, AR
February 15, 2012; 7:00 p.m., CSS		Georgia	W 57–56	10–15 (2–9)	Colonial Life Arena; Columbia, SC
February 18, 2012; 1:30 p.m., SECN		LSU	L 58–68	10–16 (2–10)	Colonial Life Arena; Columbia, SC
February 22, 2012; 1:30 p.m., SECN		at Vanderbilt	L 48–59	10–17 (2–11)	Memorial Gym; Nashville, TN
February 25, 2012; 8:00 p.m., FSN		Tennessee	L 64–73	10–18 (2–12)	Colonial Life Arena; Columbia, SC
February 29, 2012; 8:00 p.m., SECN		Mississippi State	L 67–69 ^{OT}	10–19 (2–13)	Colonial Life Arena; Columbia, SC
March 3, 2012; 1:30 p.m., SECN		at Georgia	L 55–67	10–20 (2–14)	Stegeman Coliseum; Athens, GA
2012 SEC tournament
March 8, 2012; 3:30 p.m., SECN	No. (12)	vs. (5) Alabama; First Round	L 57–63	10–21	New Orleans Arena; New Orleans, LA
*Non-conference game. ^{#}Rankings from AP Poll. (#) Tournament seedings in parentheses. All times are in Eastern.
