= 2011–12 USC Trojans men's basketball team =

American college basketball season

2011–12 USC Trojans men's basketball
- Conference: Pac-12 Conference
- Record: 6–26 (1–17 Pac-12)
- Head coach: Kevin O'Neill
- Assistant coaches: Bob Cantu; Dieter Horton; Tony Miller
- Home arena: Galen Center

2011–12 Pac-12 Conference men's basketball standings
	Conf.				Overall
Team	W		L	PCT	W		L	PCT
Washington	14	–	4	.778	24	–	11	.686
California	13	–	5	.722	24	–	10	.706
Oregon	13	–	5	.722	24	–	10	.706
Arizona	12	–	6	.667	23	–	12	.657
Colorado †	11	–	7	.611	24	–	12	.667
UCLA	11	–	7	.611	19	–	14	.576
Stanford	10	–	8	.556	26	–	11	.703
Oregon State	7	–	11	.389	21	–	15	.583
Washington State	7	–	11	.389	19	–	18	.514
Arizona State	6	–	12	.333	10	–	21	.323
Utah	3	–	15	.167	6	–	25	.194
USC	1	–	17	.056	6	–	26	.188
† Conference tournament winner As of March 8, 2012; Rankings from AP poll

The 2011–12 USC Trojans men's basketball team represented the University of Southern California during the 2011–12 NCAA Division I men's basketball season. The Trojans, led by third year head coach Kevin O'Neill, played their home games at the Galen Center and were members of the Pac-12 Conference.

They finished with a record of 6–26 overall, 1–17 in Pac-12 play and lost in the first round of the 2012 Pac-12 Conference men's basketball tournament to UCLA.

== Roster ==
Number	Name	Position	Height	Weight	Year	Hometown
1	Jio Fontan	Guard	6–0	175	Senior	Paterson, New Jersey
2	Greg Allen	Guard	6–3	180	Junior	Eureka, California
3	Alexis Moore	Guard	6–2	180	Freshman	Long Beach, California
4	Tyler Sugiyama	Guard	5–10	150	RS Sophomore	Winnetka, Illinois
10	Maurice Jones	Guard	5–7	155	Sophomore	Saginaw, Michigan
14	Dewayne Dedmon	Forward	7–0	255	RS Sophomore	Lancaster, California
20	Eric Strangis	Guard	6–4	190	Senior	La Crescenta, California
21	Aaron Fuller	Forward	6–6	235	RS Junior	Mesa, Arizona
22	Evan Smith	Forward	6–7	225	RS Sophomore	Calabasas, California
24	Daniel Munoz	Guard	5–10	175	Junior	Coto de Caza, California
25	Byron Wesley	Guard	6–5	210	Freshman	Etiwanda, California
31	James Blasczyk	Center	7–1	260	Junior	Friendswood, Texas
33	Garrett Jackson	Forward	6–6	215	Sophomore	Portland, Oregon
34	Eric Wise	Forward	6–6	240	Senior	Riverside, California
41	Danilo Dragovic	Guard	6–5	195	Freshman	Belgrade, Serbia
42	Curtis Washington	Forward	6–10	230	Sophomore	Elizabethtown, Kentucky
	Ari Stewart	Forward	6–7	205	Junior	Marietta, Georgia

== 2011–12 Schedule and results ==
Date time, TV	Rank^{#}	Opponent^{#}	Result	Record	Site (attendance) city, state
Regular season
11/11/2011*; 8:00 pm		Cal State Northridge	W 66–59	1–0	Galen Center (5,172); Los Angeles, CA
11/14/2011*; 7:30 pm, Prime Ticket		Nebraska	L 61–64 ^{2OT}	1–1	Galen Center (3,412); Los Angeles, CA
11/17/2011*; 7:00 pm, The Mtn.		at San Diego State	L 54–56	1–2	Viejas Arena (12,414); San Diego, CA
11/19/2011*; 1:00 pm		Cal Poly; IBN Las Vegas Invitational	L 36–42	1–3	Galen Center (2,606); Los Angeles, CA
11/22/2011*; 7:00 pm		Morgan State; IBN Las Vegas Invitational	W 65–62	2–3	Galen Center (2,231); Los Angeles, CA
11/25/2011*; 5:00 pm, ESPN3		vs. UNLV; IBN Las Vegas Invitational Semifinals	L 55–66	2–4	Orleans Arena (7,200); Paradise, NV
11/26/2011*; 4:30 pm		vs. South Carolina; IBN Las Vegas Invitational 3rd place	W 63–60	3–4	Orleans Arena (N/A); Las Vegas, NV
11/30/2011*; 7:00 pm		at UC Riverside	W 56–35	4–4	Student Recreation Center (2,753); Riverside, CA
12/03/2011*; 11:15 am, BTN		at Minnesota	L 40–55	4–5	Williams Arena (11,762); Minneapolis, MN
12/10/2011*; 4:00 pm, FS West		New Mexico	L 41–44	4–6	Galen Center (3,863); Los Angeles, CA
12/17/2011*; 7:00 pm, FSN		Georgia	L 59–63	4–7	Galen Center (3,784); Los Angeles, CA
12/19/2011*; 7:30 pm		TCU	W 83–59	5–7	Galen Center (3,208); Los Angeles, CA
12/22/2011*; 8:00 pm, FSN		No. 12 Kansas	L 47–63	5–8	Galen Center (6,431); Los Angeles, CA
12/29/2011; 6:00 pm, CSNCA		at California	L 49–53	5–9 (0–1)	Haas Pavilion (9,447); Berkeley, CA
12/31/2011; 3:30 pm, FS West		at Stanford	L 43–51	5–10 (0–2)	Maples Pavilion (5,741); Stanford, CA
01/05/2012; 7:30 pm		Arizona State	L 53–62	5–11 (0–3)	Galen Center (3,112); Los Angeles, CA
01/08/2012; 2:30 pm, FSN		Arizona	L 46–57	5–12 (0–4)	Galen Center (5,112); Los Angeles, CA
01/15/2012; 6:00 pm, FSN		UCLA	L 47–66	5–13 (0–5)	Galen Center (8,474); Los Angeles, CA
01/19/2012; 6:00 pm		at Oregon	L 62–65	5–14 (0–6)	Matthew Knight Arena (8,684); Eugene, OR
01/21/2012; 7:30 pm, Prime Ticket		at Oregon State	L 59–78	5–15 (0–7)	Gill Coliseum (7,537); Corvallis, OR
01/26/2012; 7:30 pm		Colorado	L 50–74	5–16 (0–8)	Galen Center (3,147); Los Angeles, CA
01/28/2012; 8:00 pm, Prime Ticket		Utah	W 62–45	6–16 (1–8)	Galen Center (2,826); Los Angeles, CA
02/02/2012; 7:05 pm		at Washington State	L 53–60	6–17 (1–9)	Beasley Coliseum (4,002); Pullman, WA
02/04/2012; 8:00 pm, FSN		at Washington	L 41–69	6–18 (1–10)	Alaska Airlines Arena (9,948); Seattle, WA
02/09/2012; 7:30 pm		California	L 49–75	6–19 (1–10)	Galen Center (3,707); Los Angeles, CA
02/12/2012; 4:30 pm, FSN		Stanford	L 47–59	6–20 (1–12)	Galen Center (4,538); Los Angeles, CA
02/15/2012; 7:30 pm, Prime Ticket		at UCLA	L 54–64	6–21 (1–13)	LA Sports Arena (9,064 ) Los Angeles, CA
02/23/2012; 5:30 pm, FSAZ		at Arizona	L 54–70	6–22 (1–14)	McKale Center (14,593); Tucson, AZ
02/25/2012; 4:00 pm, Prime Ticket		at Arizona State	L 52–56	6–23 (1–15)	Wells Fargo Arena (6,316); Tempe, AZ
03/01/2012; 7:30 pm		Washington	L 58–80	6–24 (1–16)	Galen Center (2,763); Los Angeles, CA
03/03/2012; 3:00 pm		Washington State	L 38–43	6–25 (1–17)	Galen Center (3,102); Los Angeles, CA
Pac-12 tournament
03/07/2012; 2:40 pm, FSN		vs. UCLA; First Round	L 40–55	6–26	Staples Center (5,973); Los Angeles, CA
*Non-conference game. ^{#}Rankings from AP Poll. (#) Tournament seedings in parentheses. All times are in Pacific Time.
