= 2011–12 Georgia Bulldogs basketball team =

American college basketball season

2011–12 Georgia Bulldogs men's basketball
- Conference: Southeastern Conference
- Record: 15–17 (5–11 SEC)
- Head coach: Mark Fox (3rd season)
- Home arena: Stegeman Coliseum

2011–12 Southeastern Conference men's basketball standings
	Conf.				Overall
Team	W		L	PCT	W		L	PCT
No. 1 Kentucky	16	–	0	1.000	38	–	2	.950
No. 25 Florida	10	–	6	.625	26	–	11	.703
No. 20 Vanderbilt †	10	–	6	.625	25	–	11	.694
Tennessee	10	–	6	.625	19	–	15	.559
Alabama	9	–	7	.563	21	–	12	.636
Mississippi State	8	–	8	.500	21	–	12	.636
Ole Miss	8	–	8	.500	20	–	14	.588
LSU	7	–	9	.438	18	–	15	.545
Arkansas	6	–	10	.375	18	–	14	.563
Auburn	5	–	11	.313	15	–	16	.484
Georgia	5	–	11	.313	15	–	17	.469
South Carolina	2	–	14	.125	10	–	21	.323
† 2012 SEC tournament winner As of April 2, 2012; Rankings from AP poll

The 2011–12 Georgia Bulldogs basketball team represented the University of Georgia during the college basketball season of 2011–2012. The team's head coach was Mark Fox, who was in his third season at UGA. They played their home games at Stegeman Coliseum and were members of the Southeastern Conference.

== Previous season ==
The Bulldogs finished the 2010–11 season 21–12 overall, 9–7 in SEC play and lost in the first round of the NCAA tournament to Washington.

== Roster ==
2011–12 Georgia Bulldogs men's basketball team
Players
Coaches

Pos.	#	Name	Height	Weight	Year	Hometown
G	1	Kentavious Caldwell-Pope	6 ft 5 in (1.96 m)	200 lb (91 kg)	Fr	Greenville, Georgia
F	2	Marcus Thornton	6 ft 7 in (2.01 m)	235 lb (107 kg)	So	Atlanta, Georgia
G	3	Dustin Ware	5 ft 11 in (1.8 m)	175 lb (79 kg)	Sr	Powder Springs, Georgia
F	5	Tim Dixon	6 ft 9 in (2.06 m)	225 lb (102 kg)	Fr	Columbus, Georgia
G	10	Elliott Long	6 ft 4 in (1.93 m)	195 lb (88 kg)	RS Fr	Norcross, Georgia
G	11	Vincent Williams	6 ft 1 in (1.85 m)	160 lb (73 kg)	Jr	Homestead, Florida
G	12	Matt Bucklin	6 ft 0 in (1.83 m)	170 lb (77 kg)	Sr	Marietta, Georgia
F	15	Donte' Williams	6 ft 9 in (2.06 m)	220 lb (100 kg)	So	Lithonia, Georgia
F	20	Connor Nolte	6 ft 7 in (2.01 m)	215 lb (98 kg)	RS Sr	Atlanta, Georgia
G	22	Gerald Robinson Jr.	6 ft 1 in (1.85 m)	180 lb (82 kg)	RS Sr	Nashville, Tennessee
G	23	Sherrard Brantley	6 ft 2 in (1.88 m)	180 lb (82 kg)	Jr	Dublin, Georgia
F	32	John Florveus	6 ft 11 in (2.11 m)	230 lb (104 kg)	Jr	Miami, Florida
C	41	John Cannon	6 ft 10 in (2.08 m)	245 lb (111 kg)	Fr	Burnsville, North Carolina
F	42	Nemanja Djurisic	6 ft 8 in (2.03 m)	230 lb (104 kg)	Fr	Podgorica, Montenegro

Head coach

- Mark Fox (Eastern New Mexico)

Assistant coach(es)

- Kwanza Johnson (Tulsa)
- Stacey Palmore (Livingstone College)
- Philip Pearson (Alabama)

Legend

- (C) Team captain
- (S) Suspended
- (I) Ineligible
- (W) Walk-on
- Injured
- Current redshirt

== Schedule ==
Date time, TV	Rank^{#}	Opponent^{#}	Result	Record	Site city, state
Exhibition
November 4, 2011*; 7:00 p.m.		Morehouse	W 74–50		Stegeman Coliseum; Athens, GA
Regular season
November 11, 2011*; 8:00 p.m., CSS		Wofford	W 62–49	1–0	Stegeman Coliseum; Athens, GA
November 13, 2011*; 6:00 p.m., ESPNU		Bowling Green; CBE Classic Regional site	W 63–54	2–0	Stegeman Coliseum; Athens, GA
November 16, 2011*; 7:00 p.m.		South Dakota State; CBE Classic Regional site	W 72–61	3–0	Stegeman Coliseum; Athens, GA
November 21, 2011*; 9:45 p.m., ESPN2		vs. No. 20 California; CBE Classic	L 46–70	3–1	Sprint Center; Kansas City, MO
November 22, 2011*; 7:45 p.m., ESPNU		vs. Notre Dame; CBE Classic	W 61–57	4–1	Sprint Center; Kansas City, MO
November 25, 2011*; 8:00 p.m., FSSO		at No. 12 Xavier	L 56–70	4–2	Cintas Center; Cincinnati, OH
November 28, 2011*; 7:30 p.m., FSN		at Colorado	L 68–70	4–3	Coors Events Center; Boulder, CO
December 2, 2011*; 7:00 p.m., ESPNU		Cincinnati	L 51–57	4–4	Stegeman Coliseum; Athens, GA
December 7, 2011*; 7:00 p.m., FSSO		Georgia Tech; Clean, Old-Fashioned Hate	L 56–68	4–5	Stegeman Coliseum; Athens, GA
December 17, 2011*; 10:00 p.m., FSN		at USC	W 63–59	5–5	Galen Center; Los Angeles, CA
December 20, 2011*; 7:00 p.m., CSS		Mercer	W 72–58	6–5	Stegeman Coliseum; Athens, GA
December 23, 2011*; 7:00 p.m., CSS		Furman	W 64–50	7–5	Stegeman Coliseum; Athens, GA
December 27, 2011*; 7:00 p.m., CSS		Winthrop	W 92–86 ^{OT}	8–5	Stegeman Coliseum; Athens, GA
December 30, 2011*; 2:00 p.m.		Delaware State	W 58–51	9–5	Stegeman Coliseum; Athens, GA
SEC Regular Season
January 7, 2012; 7:00 p.m., FSN		Alabama	L 59–74	9–6 (0–1)	Stegeman Coliseum; Athens, GA
January 10, 2012; 7:00 p.m., ESPN		at No. 19 Florida	L 48–70	9–7 (0–2)	O'Connell Center; Gainesville, FL
January 14, 2012; 4:00 p.m., SECN		at Vanderbilt	L 66–77	9–8 (0–3)	Memorial Gymnasium; Nashville, TN
January 18, 2012; 8:00 p.m., SECN		Tennessee	W 57–53 ^{OT}	10–8 (1–3)	Stegeman Coliseum; Athens, GA
January 21, 2012; 4:00 p.m., SECN		Ole Miss	L 63–66	10–9 (1–4)	Stegeman Coliseum; Athens, GA
January 24, 2012; 9:00 p.m., ESPN		No. 1 Kentucky	L 44–57	10–10 (1–5)	Stegeman Coliseum; Athens, GA
February 1, 2012; 8:00 p.m., SECN		at Auburn	L 51–59	10–11 (1–6)	Auburn Arena; Auburn, AL
February 4, 2012; 8:00 p.m., FSN		at Tennessee	L 62–73	10–12 (1–7)	Thompson-Boling Arena; Knoxville, TN
February 8, 2012; 8:00 p.m., SECN		Arkansas	W 81–59	11–12 (2–7)	Stegeman Coliseum; Athens, GA
February 11, 2012; 1:30 p.m., SECN		at No. 20 Mississippi State	W 70–68 ^{OT}	12–12 (3–7)	Humphrey Coliseum; Starkville, MS
February 15, 2012; 7:00 p.m., CSS		at South Carolina	L 56–57	12–13 (3–8)	Colonial Life Arena; Columbia, SC
February 19, 2012; 1:00 p.m., FSN		Vanderbilt	L 52–61	12–14 (3–9)	Stegeman Coliseum; Athens, GA
February 22, 2012; 8:00 p.m., SECN		at LSU	L 53–61	12–15 (3–10)	Maravich Assembly Center; Baton Rouge, LA
February 25, 2012; 4:00 p.m., SECN		No. 12 Florida	W 76–62	13–15 (4–10)	Stegeman Coliseum; Athens, GA
March 1, 2012; 9:00 p.m., ESPN		at No. 1 Kentucky	L 49–79	13–16 (4–11)	Rupp Arena; Lexington, KY
March 3, 2012; 1:30 p.m., SECN		South Carolina	W 67–55	14–16 (5–11)	Stegeman Coliseum; Athens, GA
2012 SEC tournament
March 8, 2012; 10:00 p.m., SECN	No. (11)	vs. (6) Mississippi State; First Round	W 71–61	15–16	New Orleans Arena; New Orleans, LA
March 9, 2012; 10:00 p.m., SECN	No. (11)	vs. (3) Vanderbilt; Quarterfinals	L 41–63	15–17	New Orleans Arena; New Orleans, LA
*Non-conference game. ^{#}Rankings from AP Poll. (#) Tournament seedings in parentheses.
