= 2011–12 Utah Utes men's basketball team =

American college basketball season

2011–12 Utah Utes men's basketball
- Conference: Pac-12 Conference
- Record: 6–25 (3–15 Pac–12)
- Head coach: Larry Krystkowiak (1st season)
- Assistant coaches: Tommy Connor; DeMarlo Slocum; Andy Hill
- Home arena: Jon M. Huntsman Center

2011–12 Pac-12 Conference men's basketball standings
	Conf.				Overall
Team	W		L	PCT	W		L	PCT
Washington	14	–	4	.778	24	–	11	.686
California	13	–	5	.722	24	–	10	.706
Oregon	13	–	5	.722	24	–	10	.706
Arizona	12	–	6	.667	23	–	12	.657
Colorado †	11	–	7	.611	24	–	12	.667
UCLA	11	–	7	.611	19	–	14	.576
Stanford	10	–	8	.556	26	–	11	.703
Oregon State	7	–	11	.389	21	–	15	.583
Washington State	7	–	11	.389	19	–	18	.514
Arizona State	6	–	12	.333	10	–	21	.323
Utah	3	–	15	.167	6	–	25	.194
USC	1	–	17	.056	6	–	26	.188
† Conference tournament winner As of March 8, 2012; Rankings from AP poll

The 2011–12 Utah Utes men's basketball team represented the University of Utah. They played their home games at the Jon M. Huntsman Center in Salt Lake City, Utah, and were a member of the Pac-12 Conference. They were led by their first-year head coach Larry Krystkowiak. They finished with a record of 6-25 overall, 3-15 in Pac-12 play and lost in the first round of the 2012 Pac-12 Conference men's basketball tournament by Colorado.

== Roster ==
#	Name	Position	Height	Weight (lbs.)	Class	Hometown	Last college or high school
0	Chris Hines	G	6–1	195	RS Junior	Houston, TX	Klein Forest HS
1	Glen Dean	G	5–10	170	Junior	Seattle, WA	Eastern Washington
2	Aaron Dotson	G	6–4	205	Junior	Seattle, WA	LSU
3	Anthony Odunsi	G	6–3	200	Freshman	Fort Bend, TX	Travis HS
5	Kareem Storey	G	6–0	190	Freshman	Baltimore, MD	Princeton Day School
10	Dijon Farr	F	6–6	213	Junior	Pacolet, SC	Indian Hills CC
11	Alex Mortensen	G	6–1	160	Freshman	Springville, UT	Springville HS
15	Josh Watkins	G	6–0	200	Senior	New York City, NY	Howard College
21	Javon Dawson	F	6–7	260	RS Sophomore	Cordele, GA	Gulf Coast CC
25	Blake Wilkinson	F	6–7	230	Freshman	Bountiful, UT	Viewmont HS
32	George Matthews	F	6–7	220	Freshman	Phoenix, AZ	Westwind Prep
40	Alexander Ricketts	F	6–8	214	RS Sophomore	Sandy, UT	Simon Fraser University
42	Jason Washburn	C	7–0	230	RS Junior	Battle Creek, MI	Battle Creek Central HS
43	Cedric Martin	G	6–4	190	Junior	Minneapolis, MN	Lee College
51	David Foster	C	7–3	255	Senior	Lake Forest, CA	El Toro HS
53	Corbin Green	G/F	6–5	200	RS Sophomore	Salt Lake City, UT	Snow College

== Schedule and results ==
Date time, TV	Rank^{#}	Opponent^{#}	Result	Record	Site (attendance) city, state
Exhibition
11/04/2011*; 7:00 pm		Adams State	L 60–61	–	Jon M. Huntsman Center (7,952); Salt Lake City, UT
Regular season
11/14/2011*; 7:00 pm		San Diego Christian	W 58–55	1–0	Jon M. Huntsman Center (7,774); Salt Lake City, UT
11/16/2011*; 6:00 pm, The Mtn.		at Boise State	L 59–80	1–1	Taco Bell Arena (4,551); Boise, ID
11/19/2011*; 2:00 pm		Montana State	L 64–70	1–2	Jon M. Huntsman Center (7,957); Salt Lake City, UT
11/24/2011*; 7:30 pm, HDNet		vs. Harvard; Battle 4 Atlantis Quarterfinals	L 47–75	1–3	Imperial Arena (2,530); Nassau, BAH
11/25/2011*; 7:30 pm, HDNet		vs. Massachusetts; Battle 4 Atlantis Loser Bracket	L 75–89	1–4	Imperial Arena (3,441); Nassau, BAH
11/26/2011*; 7:30 pm, HDNet		vs. UNC Asheville; Battle 4 Atlantis 7th Place Game	L 65–87	1–5	Imperial Arena (1,645); Nassau, BAH
12/03/2011*; 2:00 pm		at Fresno State	L 52–82	1–6	Save Mart Center (5,843); Fresno, CA
12/07/2011*; 7:00 pm		Cal State Fullerton	L 50–81	1–7	Jon M. Huntsman Center (7,671); Salt Lake City, UT
12/10/2011*; 12:00 pm, FSN		BYU	L 42–61	1–8	Jon M. Huntsman Center (10,327); Salt Lake City, UT
12/16/2011*; 7:00 pm		Idaho State	W 71–59	2–8	Jon M. Huntsman Center (7,295); Salt Lake City, UT
12/19/2011*; 7:00 pm		Portland	W 72–67	3–8	Jon M. Huntsman Center (7,910); Salt Lake City, UT
12/22/2011*; 7:00 pm, Altitude		at Weber State	L 51–80	3–9	Dee Events Center (8,239); Ogden, UT
12/31/2011; 4:00 pm, RTRM		at Colorado	L 33–73	3–10 (0–1)	Coors Events Center (6,491); Boulder, CO
01/05/2012; 7:00 pm		Washington State	W 62–60 ^{OT}	4–10 (1–1)	Jon M. Huntsman Center (8,412); Salt Lake City, UT
01/07/2012; 12:00 pm, FSN		Washington	L 53–57	4–11 (1–2)	Jon M. Huntsman Center (8,887); Salt Lake City, UT
01/12/2012; 8:00 pm		at Stanford	L 65–68	4–12 (1–3)	Maples Pavilion (4,981); Stanford, CA
01/14/2012; 7:30 pm, CSNCA		at California	L 45–81	4–13 (1–4)	Haas Pavilion (7,457); Berkeley, CA
01/19/2012; 7:00 pm, FSAZ		Arizona	L 51–77	4–14 (1–5)	Jon M. Huntsman Center (8,492); Salt Lake City, UT
01/21/2012; 3:00 pm		Arizona State	W 64–43	5–14 (2–5)	Jon M. Huntsman Center (9,092); Salt Lake City, UT
01/26/2012; 8:30 pm, Prime Ticket		at UCLA	L 49–76	5–15 (2–6)	LA Sports Arena (4,434); Los Angeles, CA
01/28/2012; 8:00 pm, Prime Ticket		at USC	L 45–62	5–16 (2–7)	Galen Center (2,826); Los Angeles, CA
02/02/2012; 7:00 pm		Oregon	L 68–79	5–17 (2–8)	Jon M. Huntsman Center (8,024); Salt Lake City, UT
02/04/2012; 3:00 pm		Oregon State	L 58–76	5–18 (2–9)	Jon M. Huntsman Center (8,404); Salt Lake City, UT
02/09/2012; 6:30 pm, FSAZ.com		at Arizona State	L 52–57	5–19 (2–10)	Wells Fargo Arena (5,002); Tempe, AZ
02/11/2012; 12:00 pm, FSN		at Arizona	L 61–70	5–20 (2–11)	McKale Center (14,084); Tucson, AZ
02/18/2012; 2:00 pm, FSN		Colorado	L 48–55	5–21 (2–12)	Jon M. Huntsman Center (N/A); Salt Lake City, UT
02/23/2012; 7:00 pm		California	L 46–60	5–22 (2–13)	Jon M. Huntsman Center (8,426); Salt Lake City, UT
02/25/2012; 6:30 pm, CSNBA		Stanford	W 58–57	6–22 (3–13)	Jon M. Huntsman Center (8,933); Salt Lake City, UT
03/01/2012; 8:00 pm		at Oregon State	L 67–77	6–23 (3–14)	Gill Coliseum (3,643); Corvallis, OR
03/03/2012; 4:00 pm, CSNNW		at Oregon	L 48–94	6–24 (3–15)	Matthew Knight Arena (10,444); Eugene, OR
2012 Pac-12 Conference men's basketball tournament
03/07/2012; 9:40 pm, FSN		vs. Colorado; First Round	L 41–53	6–25	Staples Center (6,747); Los Angeles, CA
*Non-conference game. ^{#}Rankings from AP Poll/Coaches' Poll. (#) Tournament seedings in parentheses. All times are in Mountain Time.

== Player Dismissal ==
On January 18, 2012 Josh Watkins was dismissed for his second violation of team rules within the same season. The first offense on December 6, 2011 led to Watkins being suspended for one game. Coach Krystkowiak would state that the program must always come first and that the integrity of the program cannot be sacrificed for one player.
