= 2011–12 Arkansas Razorbacks men's basketball team =

American college basketball season

2011–12 Arkansas Razorbacks men's basketball
- Conference: Southeastern Conference
- Record: 18–14 (6–10 SEC)
- Head coach: Mike Anderson (1st season)
- Assistant coach: Melvin Watkins; TJ Cleveland; Matt Zimmerman
- Home arena: Bud Walton Arena

2011–12 Southeastern Conference men's basketball standings
	Conf.				Overall
Team	W		L	PCT	W		L	PCT
No. 1 Kentucky	16	–	0	1.000	38	–	2	.950
No. 25 Florida	10	–	6	.625	26	–	11	.703
No. 20 Vanderbilt †	10	–	6	.625	25	–	11	.694
Tennessee	10	–	6	.625	19	–	15	.559
Alabama	9	–	7	.563	21	–	12	.636
Mississippi State	8	–	8	.500	21	–	12	.636
Ole Miss	8	–	8	.500	20	–	14	.588
LSU	7	–	9	.438	18	–	15	.545
Arkansas	6	–	10	.375	18	–	14	.563
Auburn	5	–	11	.313	15	–	16	.484
Georgia	5	–	11	.313	15	–	17	.469
South Carolina	2	–	14	.125	10	–	21	.323
† 2012 SEC tournament winner As of April 2, 2012; Rankings from AP poll

The 2011–12 Arkansas Razorbacks men's basketball team represented the University of Arkansas in the sport of basketball during the 2011–12 college basketball season. The Razorbacks competed in Division I of the National Collegiate Athletic Association (NCAA) and the Southeastern Conference (SEC). They were led by head coach Mike Anderson, and played their home games at Bud Walton Arena on the university's Fayetteville, Arkansas campus.

== Previous season ==
The Razorbacks finished the 2010–11 season 18–13, 7–9 in SEC play and lost in the first round of the SEC tournament to Tennessee. Head coach John Pelphrey was fired following the season after compiling a 69–59 overall record during four years with Arkansas.

== Roster ==
2011–12 Arkansas Razorbacks men's basketball team
Players
Coaches

Pos.	#	Name	Height	Weight	Year	Hometown
G	00	Rashad Madden	6 ft 5 in (1.96 m)	175 lb (79 kg)	Fr	Lepanto, Arkansas
G	1	Mardracus Wade	6 ft 2 in (1.88 m)	175 lb (79 kg)	So	Memphis, Tennessee
G	3	Rickey Scott	6 ft 3 in (1.91 m)	202 lb (92 kg)	So	Irving, Texas
F	4	Devonta Abron	6 ft 8 in (2.03 m)	255 lb (116 kg)	Fr	Dallas, Texas
G	11	B. J. Young	6 ft 3 in (1.91 m)	175 lb (79 kg)	Fr	St. Louis, Missouri
G	20	Kikko Haydar	5 ft 11 in (1.8 m)	165 lb (75 kg)	So	Fayetteville, Arkansas
F	21	Hunter Mickelson	6 ft 10 in (2.08 m)	236 lb (107 kg)	Fr	Jonesboro, Arkansas
F	22	Marvell Waithe	6 ft 9 in (2.06 m)	216 lb (98 kg)	Sr	Toronto, Ontario
G	23	Julysses Nobles	6 ft 1 in (1.85 m)	174 lb (79 kg)	Jr	Jackson, Mississippi
F	31	Michael Sanchez	6 ft 8 in (2.03 m)	236 lb (107 kg)	RS Sr	Springdale, Arkansas
F	33	Marshawn Powell	6 ft 7 in (2.01 m)	235 lb (107 kg)	Jr	Newport News, Virginia

Head coach

- Mike Anderson (Tulsa)

Assistant coach(es)

- Melvin Watkins (Charlotte)
- T.J. Cleveland (Arkansas)
- Matt Zimmerman (Arkansas)

Legend

- (C) Team captain
- (S) Suspended
- (I) Ineligible
- (W) Walk-on
- Injured
- Current redshirt

== Schedule ==
Date time, TV	Rank^{#}	Opponent^{#}	Result	Record	Site city, state
Exhibition
November 4, 2011; 7:00 p.m., RazorVison		Texas A&M-Commerce	W 97–80		Bud Walton Arena; Fayetteville, AR
November 8, 2011; 7:00 p.m., RazorVison		Christian Brothers	W 76–54		Bud Walton Arena; Fayetteville, AR
Regular Season
November 11, 2011*; 7:00 p.m., RazorVison		USC Upstate	W 83–63	1–0	Bud Walton Arena; Fayetteville, AR
November 16, 2011*; 7:00 p.m., RazorVison		Oakland; Southwest Showcase	W 91–68	2–0	Bud Walton Arena; Fayetteville, AR
November 18, 2011*; 7:00 p.m., FSN		vs. Houston; Southwest Showcase	L 78–87	2–1	Verizon Arena; North Little Rock, AR
November 22, 2011*; 7:00 p.m., RazorVison		Utah Valley; Southwest Showcase	W 67–59	3–1	Bud Walton Arena; Fayetteville, AR
November 26, 2011*; 7:00 p.m., RazorVison		Grambling State	W 86–44	4–1	Bud Walton Arena; Fayetteville, AR
November 30, 2011*; 7:00 p.m., RSN		Mississippi Valley State	W 97–64	5–1	Bud Walton Arena; Fayetteville, AR
December 3, 2011*; 2:15 p.m., ESPN		at No. 8 Connecticut; SEC–Big East Challenge	L 62–75	5–2	XL Center; Hartford, CT
December 10, 2011*; 2:00 p.m., RSN		at Oklahoma	L 63–78	5–3	Lloyd Noble Center; Norman, OK
December 17, 2011*; 2:00 p.m., Razorvison		Southeastern Louisiana	W 62–55	6–3	Bud Walton Arena; Fayetteville, AR
December 20, 2011*; 7:00 p.m., RSN		Eastern Kentucky	W 71–57	7–3	Bud Walton Arena; Fayetteville, AR
December 22, 2011*; 7:00 p.m., Razorvison		Louisiana Tech	W 77–63	8–3	Bud Walton Arena; Fayetteville, AR
December 28, 2011*; 7:00 p.m., RSN		Charlotte	W 80–67	9–3	Bud Walton Arena; Fayetteville, AR
December 30, 2011*; 7:00 p.m., RSN		Texas Southern	W 77–49	10–3	Bud Walton Arena; Fayetteville, AR
January 3, 2012*; 7:00 p.m., RSN		Savannah State	W 83–66	11–3	Bud Walton Arena; Fayetteville, AR
SEC Regular Season
January 7, 2012; 9:00 p.m., CSS		No. 15 Mississippi State	W 98–88	12–3 (1–0)	Bud Walton Arena; Fayetteville, AR
January 11, 2012; 8:00 p.m., SECN		at Ole Miss	L 63–71	12–4 (1–1)	Tad Smith Coliseum; Oxford, MS
January 14, 2012; 9:00 p.m., FSN		LSU	W 69–60	13–4 (2–1)	Bud Walton Arena; Fayetteville, AR
January 17, 2012; 9:00 p.m., ESPN		at No. 2 Kentucky	L 63–86	13–5 (2–2)	Rupp Arena; Lexington, KY
January 21, 2012*; 1:00 p.m., CBS		No. 20 Michigan	W 66–64	14–5	Bud Walton Arena; Fayetteville, AR
January 25, 2012; 9:00 p.m., CSS		Auburn	W 56–53	15–5 (3–2)	Bud Walton Arena; Fayetteville, AR
January 28, 2012; 1:30 p.m., SECN		at Alabama	L 66–72	15–6 (3–3)	Coleman Coliseum; Tuscaloosa, AL
January 31, 2012; 9:00 p.m., ESPN		No. 25 Vanderbilt	W 84-74	16–6 (4–3)	Bud Walton Arena; Fayetteville, AR
February 4, 2012; 1:30 p.m., SECN		at LSU	L 65–71	16–7 (4–4)	Maravich Assembly Center; Baton Rouge, LA
February 8, 2012; 8:00 p.m., SECN		at Georgia	L 59–81	16–8 (4–5)	Stegeman Coliseum; Athens, GA
February 11, 2012; 1:30 p.m., SECN		South Carolina	W 76–65	17–8 (5–5)	Bud Walton Arena; Fayetteville, AR
February 15, 2012; 8:00 p.m., SECN		at Tennessee	L 58–77	17–9 (5–6)	Thompson-Boling Arena; Knoxville, TN
February 18, 2012; 6:00 p.m., ESPN2		No. 14 Florida	L 68–98	17–10 (5–7)	Bud Walton Arena; Fayetteville, AR
February 23, 2012; 7:00 p.m., ESPN		Alabama	L 68–79	17–11 (5–8)	Bud Walton Arena; Fayetteville, AR
February 25, 2012; 4:00 p.m., SECN		at Auburn	W 77–71	18–11 (6–8)	Auburn Arena; Auburn, AL
February 28, 2012; 7:00 p.m., ESPNU		Ole Miss	L 75–77	18–12 (6–9)	Bud Walton Arena; Fayetteville, AR
March 3, 2012; 5:00 p.m., FSN		at Mississippi State	L 59–79	18–13 (6–10)	Humphrey Coliseum; Starkville, MS
2012 SEC tournament
March 8, 2012; 1:00 p.m., SECN	No. (9)	vs. (8) LSU; First Round	L 54–70	18–14	New Orleans Arena; New Orleans, LA
*Non-conference game. ^{#}Rankings from AP Poll. (#) Tournament seedings in parentheses. All times are in Eastern Time Zone.
