= 2011–12 Stanford Cardinal men's basketball team =

American college basketball season

2011–12 Stanford Cardinal men's basketball

NIT champions
- Conference: Pac-12 Conference
- Record: 26–11 (10–8 Pac-12)
- Head coach: Johnny Dawkins
- Assistant coaches: Dick Davey; Charles Payne; Mike Schrage
- Home arena: Maples Pavilion

2011–12 Pac-12 Conference men's basketball standings
	Conf.				Overall
Team	W		L	PCT	W		L	PCT
Washington	14	–	4	.778	24	–	11	.686
California	13	–	5	.722	24	–	10	.706
Oregon	13	–	5	.722	24	–	10	.706
Arizona	12	–	6	.667	23	–	12	.657
Colorado †	11	–	7	.611	24	–	12	.667
UCLA	11	–	7	.611	19	–	14	.576
Stanford	10	–	8	.556	26	–	11	.703
Oregon State	7	–	11	.389	21	–	15	.583
Washington State	7	–	11	.389	19	–	18	.514
Arizona State	6	–	12	.333	10	–	21	.323
Utah	3	–	15	.167	6	–	25	.194
USC	1	–	17	.056	6	–	26	.188
† Conference tournament winner As of March 8, 2012; Rankings from AP poll

The 2011–12 Stanford Cardinal men's basketball team represented Stanford University during the 2011–12 NCAA Division I men's basketball season. The Cardinal, led by fourth-year head coach Johnny Dawkins, played their home games at Maples Pavilion and are members of the Pac-12 Conference. They finished with the record of 26–11 overall, 10–8 in Pac-12 play. They lost in the quarterfinals of the 2012 Pac-12 Conference men's basketball tournament to California.

The Cardinal were invited to the 2012 National Invitation Tournament Stanford defeated Cleveland St., Illinois St., Nevada and Massachusetts to advance to the championship game. In the final, Stanford beat the Minnesota Golden Gophers 75–51 to become the 2012 NIT Champions.

== Roster ==
Number	Name	Position	Height	Weight	Year	Hometown
2	Aaron Bright	Guard	5–11	175	Sophomore	Bellevue, Washington
3	Anthony Brown	Guard/forward	6–6	200	Sophomore	Huntington Beach, California
4	Stefan Nastić	Center	6–11	225	RS freshman	Thornhill, Ontario, Canada
5	Chasson Randle	Guard	6–1	170	Freshman	Rock Island, Illinois
10	Robbie Lemons	Guard	6–3	193	Sophomore	Carmichael, California
11	Andy Brown	Forward	6–7	218	RS junior	Yorba Linda, California
13	Josh Owens	Forward/center	6–8	230	Senior	Kennesaw, Georgia
14	Jack Ryan	Guard/forward	6–7	200	Freshman	Glenview, Illinois
22	Jarrett Mann	Guard	6–4	190	Senior	Middletown, Delaware
23	Gabriel Harris	Guard	6–2	190	Junior	Birmingham, Alabama
24	Josh Huestis	Forward	6–7	223	Sophomore	Great Falls, Montana
33	Dwight Powell	Forward	6–9	227	Sophomore	Toronto, Ontario, Canada
34	Andrew Zimmermann	Forward	6–8	230	Senior	Oostburg, Wisconsin
40	John Gage	Forward/center	6–9	220	Sophomore	Vashon Island, Washington
50	Jack Trotter	Forward/center	6–9	230	Senior	Moraga, California

== Schedule and results ==
Date time, TV	Rank^{#}	Opponent^{#}	Result	Record	Site (attendance) city, state
Exhibition
11/05/2011*; 7:00 PM		Ryerson	W 100–47	–	Maples Pavilion (N/A); Stanford, CA
Regular season
11/11/2011*; 7:00 pm		Central Arkansas	W 92–51	1–0	Maples Pavilion (5,206); Stanford, CA
11/14/2011*; 8:00 pm, ESPNU		Fresno State; NIT Season Tip-Off First Round	W 75–59	2–0	Maples Pavilion (4,385); Stanford, CA
11/15/2011*; 8:00 pm, ESPNU		Colorado State; NIT Season Tip-Off Quarterfinals	W 64–52	3–0	Maples Pavilion (4,337); Stanford, CA
11/18/2011*; 7:00 pm, CSNBA		at UC Davis	W 70–49	4–0	The Pavilion (4,427); Davis, CA
11/23/2011*; 4:00 pm, ESPN2		vs. Oklahoma State; NIT Season Tip-Off Semifinals	W 82–67	5–0	Madison Square Garden (8,293); New York, NY
11/24/2011*; 2:00 pm, ESPN		vs. No. 5 Syracuse; NIT Season Tip-Off Championship	L 63–69	5–1	Madison Square Garden (8,477); New York, NY
11/28/2011*; 7:00 pm		Pacific	W 79–37	6–1	Maples Pavilion (4,642); Stanford, CA
12/01/2011*; 7:10 pm, RTNW		at Seattle	W 72–49	7–1	KeyArena (3,046); Seattle, WA
12/04/2011*; 1:00 pm, FSN		NC State	W 76–72	8–1	Maples Pavilion (5,871); Stanford, CA
12/17/2011*; 5:00 pm		San Diego	W 75–55	9–1	Maples Pavilion (4,761); Stanford, CA
12/19/2011*; 7:00 pm		Bethune-Cookman	W 75–56	10–1	Maples Pavilion (4,379); Stanford, CA
12/22/2011*; 6:00 pm, FSN		Butler	L 66–71	10–2	Maples Pavilion (5,693); Stanford, CA
12/29/2011; 8:00 pm, FSN		UCLA	W 60–59	11–2 (1–0)	Maples Pavilion (6,777); Stanford, CA
12/31/2011; 3:30 pm, CSNBA		USC	W 51–43	12–2 (2–0)	Maples Pavilion (5,741); Stanford, CA
01/05/2012; 6:00 pm, CSNBA		at Oregon	L 67–78	12–3 (2–1)	Matthew Knight Arena (6,199); Eugene, OR
01/07/2012; 7:00 pm, RTNW		at Oregon State	W 103–101 ^{4OT}	13–3 (3–1)	Gill Coliseum (7,239); Corvallis, OR
01/12/2012; 7:00 pm		Utah	W 68–65	14–3 (4–1)	Maples Pavilion (4,981); Stanford, CA
01/14/2012; 1:00 pm, FSN		Colorado	W 84–64	15–3 (5–1)	Maples Pavilion (5,850); Stanford, CA
01/19/2012; 7:00 pm		at Washington State	L 69–81	15–4 (5–2)	Beasley Coliseum (3,119); Pullman, WA
01/21/2012; 3:00 pm, CSNBA		at Washington	L 63–76	15–5 (5–3)	Alaska Airlines Arena (9,794); Seattle, WA
01/29/2012; 5:30 pm, FSN		at California	L 59–69	15–6 (5–4)	Haas Pavilion (11,877); Berkeley, CA
02/02/2012; 7:00 pm		Arizona State	W 68–44	16–6 (6–4)	Maples Pavilion (4,719); Stanford, CA
02/04/2012; 12:00 pm, FSN		Arizona	L 43–56	16–7 (6–5)	Maples Pavilion (6,231); Stanford, CA
02/09/2012; 8:00 pm, Prime Ticket		at UCLA	L 61–72	16–8 (6–6)	LA Sports Arena (5,207); Los Angeles, CA
02/12/2012; 4:30 pm, FSN		at USC	W 59–47	17–8 (7–6)	Galen Center (4,538); Los Angeles, CA
02/16/2012; 7:00 pm		Oregon State	W 87–82	18–8 (8–6)	Maples Pavilion (5,005); Stanford, CA
02/19/2012; 4:30 pm, FSN		Oregon	L 64–68	18–9 (8–7)	Maples Pavilion (6,197); Stanford, CA
02/23/2012; 7:30 pm, FSN		at Colorado	W 74–50	19–9 (9–7)	Coors Events Center (11,036); Boulder, CO
02/25/2012; 5:30 pm, CSNBA		at Utah	L 57–58	19–10 (9–8)	Jon M. Huntsman Center (8,933); Salt Lake City, UT
03/04/2012; 2:30 pm, FSN		California	W 75–70	20–10 (10–8)	Maples Pavilion (6,899); Stanford, CA
Pac-12 tournament
03/07/2012; 6:10 pm, FSN		vs. Arizona State; First Round	W 85–65	21–10	Staples Center (N/A); Los Angeles, CA
03/08/2012; 6:10 pm, FSN		vs. California; Quarterfinals	L 71–77	21–11	Staples Center (N/A); Los Angeles, CA
2012 NIT
03/13/2012*; 8:00 pm, ESPN2		Cleveland State; First Round	W 76–65	22–11	Maples Pavilion (1,339); Stanford, CA
03/19/2012*; 8:00 pm, ESPN2		Illinois State; Second Round	W 92–88 ^{OT}	23–11	Maples Pavilion (1,781); Stanford, CA
03/21/2012*; 6:00 pm, ESPN2		Nevada; Quarterfinals	W 84–56	24–11	Maples Pavilion (3,020); Stanford, CA
03/27/2012*; 4:00 pm, ESPN2		vs. Massachusetts; Semifinals	W 74–64	25–11	Madison Square Garden (7,574); New York, NY
03/29/2012*; 4:00 pm, ESPN		vs. Minnesota; Championship Game	W 75–51	26–11	Madison Square Garden (5,494); New York, NY
*Non-conference game. ^{#}Rankings from AP Poll. (#) Tournament seedings in parentheses. All times are in Pacific Time.

.
