= Brad Tinsley =

American basketball player

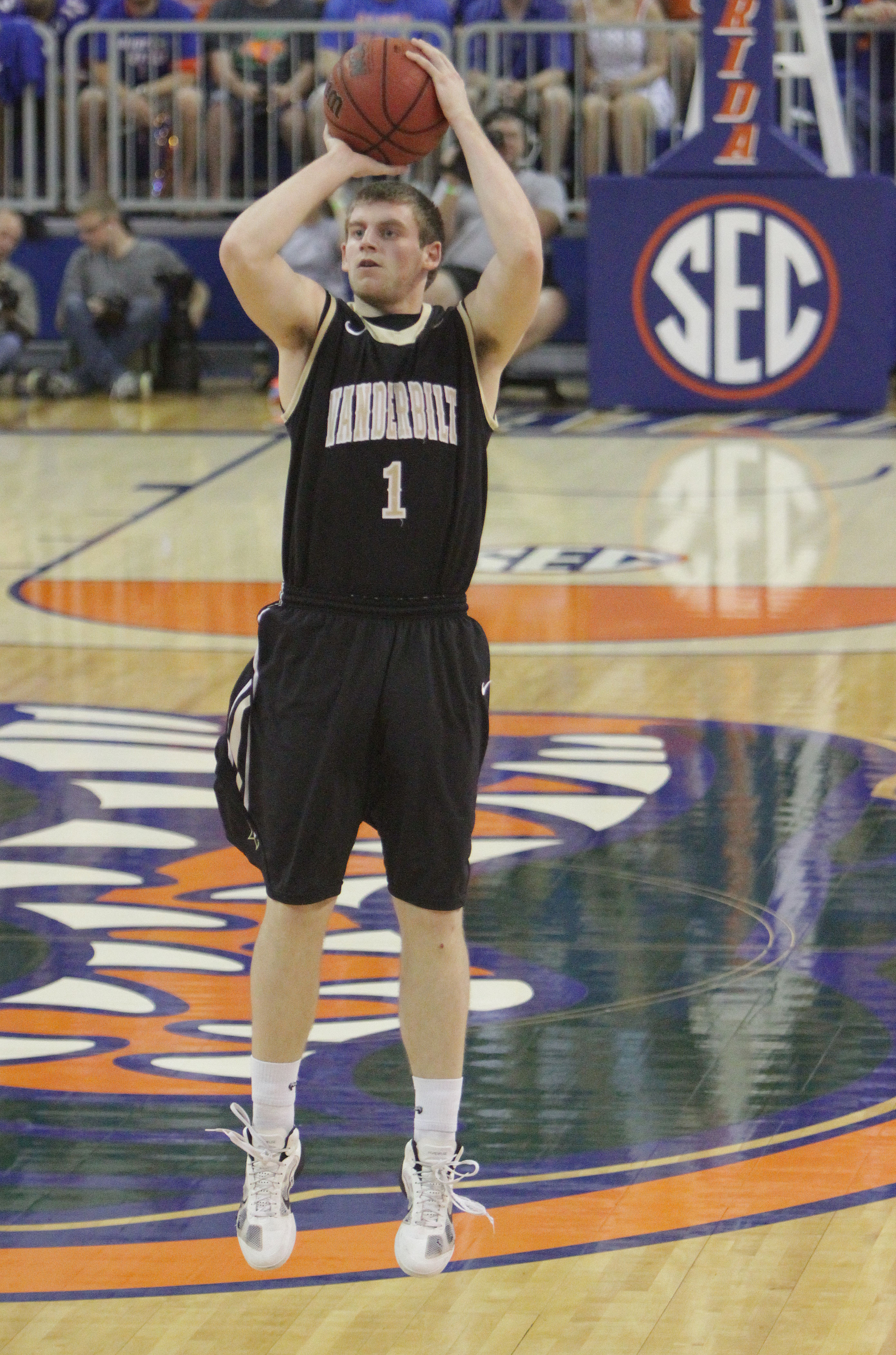
- Tinsley with Vanderbilt in 2012

Personal information
- Born: May 10, 1989 (age 37) Oregon City, Oregon, U.S.
- Listed height: 6 ft 3 in (1.91 m)
- Listed weight: 210 lb (95 kg)

Career information
- High school: Oregon City (Oregon City, Oregon)
- College: Vanderbilt (2008–2012)
- NBA draft: 2012: undrafted
- Playing career: 2012–2022
- Position: Point guard / shooting guard

Career history
- 2012–2013: Okapi Aalstar
- 2013: SVBD
- 2014: Lakeside Lightning
- 2014–2015: MLP Academics Heidelberg
- 2015–2017: FC Porto
- 2017: Vytautas Prienai-Birštonas
- 2017–2018: Chemnitz 99
- 2018–2019: Junior Casale
- 2019–2022: FC Porto

Career highlights
- Portuguese League champion (2016); Portuguese Cup winner (2019); 2× Portuguese League Cup winner (2016, 2021); 2× Portuguese Supercup winner (2016, 2019)

Bradley Glen Tinsley (born May 10, 1989) is an American former professional basketball player. He played college basketball for the Vanderbilt Commodores before playing professionally in Belgium, France, Australia, Germany, Portugal, Lithuania and Italy.

== High school career ==
In 2008, Tinsley led the Pioneers to state runner-up as a senior. He averaged 25 points, seven rebounds, seven assists, and three steals during the season. Tinsley also won the Oregon Player of the Year as well as the Gatorade Player of the Year in the state of Oregon in his last season at Oregon City High School. He finished second in all-time leading scoring for "big schools" and fourth overall in the state of Oregon. First on that list is Cleveland Cavaliers power forward Kevin Love. In December 2007, his squad was the runner-up at the Les Schwab Invitational.

Tinsley was a first-team all-league selection in all four years of high school and was all-state in his junior and senior seasons. He also lettered four times in basketball and baseball and lettered twice in football.

=== Recruiting ===
Tinsley was ranked 93rd in the ESPNU top 100 and was ranked 15th among point guards. Tinsley originally committed to Pepperdine University but was released from his letter of intent in January 2008 after the head coach, Vance Walberg, unexpectedly resigned. Tinsley later signed with Vanderbilt after also considering Wake Forest University. He was also recruited by the University of Oregon, University of Southern California, and Arizona State University.

== College career ==
Tinsley played four-years of college basketball for the Vanderbilt Commodores from 2008 to 2012. As a senior, he played and started in all 36 games, averaging 9.0 points, 2.6 rebounds, and 4.1 assists per game.

Tinsley became the first Commodore to record a triple-double. On November 12, 2010, Tinsley finished with 11 points, 10 rebounds, and 10 assists.

=== Career statistics ===
Year	Team	GP	GS	MPG	FG%	3P%	FT%	RPG	APG	SPG	BPG	PPG
2008–09	Vanderbilt	31	28	31.0	.419	.411	.824	2.5	2.8	.6	.2	11.0
2009–10	Vanderbilt	33	27	26.0	.405	.295	.865	2.5	2.8	.5	.2	7.0
2010–11	Vanderbilt	34	34	32.7	.436	.369	.824	3.7	4.6	.8	.2	10.6
2011–12	Vanderbilt	36	36	27.5	.474	.415	.855	2.6	4.1	.6	.1	9.0
Career		134	125	29.2	.434	.377	.838	2.8	3.6	.6	.2	9.4

=== Career highs ===
- Points: 20 @ Alabama 3/12/09
- Rebounds: 10 – 2 times
- Assists: 10 – 2 times
- Steals: 3 – 3 times
- 3-point field-goals made: 5 – 2 times

== Professional career ==
Tinsley went undrafted in the 2012 NBA draft. In July 2012, he signed with EiffelTowers den Bosch of the Netherlands for the 2012–13 season. However, he later left EiffelTowers due to an ankle injury.

In December 2012, he signed with Okapi Aalstar of Belgium for the rest of the season. On January 31, 2013, he left Okapi after just seven games. On February 5, 2013, he signed with Saint-Vallier Basket Drôme of the French LNB Pro B for the rest of the season.

In January 2014, he signed with the Lakeside Lightning for the 2014 State Basketball League season. On August 9, 2014, he recorded a massive 56 points in the Lightning's 150–144 triple-overtime win over the Stirling Senators in Game 3 of their quarter-final series.

On August 8, 2014, he signed with MLP Academics Heidelberg of the German Pro A league.

On July 29, 2015, he signed a one-year deal with FC Porto of the Liga Portuguesa de Basquetebol.

He briefly played for BC Vytautas in the 2017–2018 season, but left in December. He joined BV Chemnitz of the German Pro A and averaged 9.2 points, 3.2 rebounds and 3.8 assists per game. On July 5, 2018, Tinsley signed with A.S. Junior Pallacanestro Casale of the Italian Serie A2, but he returned to FC Porto soon after, joining the Portuguese side in February 2019.

=== Career statistics ===
Season	League	Team	GP	GS	MPG	FG%	3P%	FT%	RPG	APG	SPG	BPG	PPG
2012–13	Basketball League Belgium	Okapi Aalstar	4	1	19.5	.333	.286	.000	1.0	1.0	0.0	0.0	4.5
2012–13	EuroChallenge	Okapi Aalstar	3	0	25.7	.529	.500	.000	1.0	1.3	0.3	0.0	7.3
2012–13	LNB Pro B	Saint-Vallier	13	9	28.0	.421	.413	.806	2.7	1.7	0.5	0.1	10.3
2014	State Basketball League	Lakeside	31	–	40.3	.501	.370	.802	4.4	6.0	0.7	0.2	28.4
2014–15	2. Basketball Bundesliga	Heidelberg	33	–	33.4	.548	.396	.767	3.8	3.5	0.8	0.0	16.8

== Personal life ==
Tinsley's wife, Margaret, played college basketball at UC Santa Barbara.
