= 2011–12 Mississippi State Bulldogs basketball team =

American college basketball season

2011–12 Mississippi State Bulldogs men's basketball

2K Sports Classic Champions

National Invitation Tournament, First round
- Conference: Southeastern Conference
- Record: 21–12 (8–8 SEC)
- Head coach: Rick Stansbury (14th season)
- Assistant coaches: George Brooks; Phil Cunningham; Marcus Grant
- Home arena: Humphrey Coliseum

2011–12 Southeastern Conference men's basketball standings
	Conf.				Overall
Team	W		L	PCT	W		L	PCT
No. 1 Kentucky	16	–	0	1.000	38	–	2	.950
No. 25 Florida	10	–	6	.625	26	–	11	.703
No. 20 Vanderbilt †	10	–	6	.625	25	–	11	.694
Tennessee	10	–	6	.625	19	–	15	.559
Alabama	9	–	7	.563	21	–	12	.636
Mississippi State	8	–	8	.500	21	–	12	.636
Ole Miss	8	–	8	.500	20	–	14	.588
LSU	7	–	9	.438	18	–	15	.545
Arkansas	6	–	10	.375	18	–	14	.563
Auburn	5	–	11	.313	15	–	16	.484
Georgia	5	–	11	.313	15	–	17	.469
South Carolina	2	–	14	.125	10	–	21	.323
† 2012 SEC tournament winner As of April 2, 2012; Rankings from AP poll

The 2011–12 Mississippi State basketball team represented Mississippi State University in the 2011–12 college basketball season. The team's head coach was Rick Stansbury, in his fourteenth and final season. The team played their home games at Humphrey Coliseum in Starkville, Mississippi, and was a member of the Southeastern Conference.

== Pre-season ==
The Bulldogs posted a record of 17–14 (9–7 SEC) in the 2010–11 season and finished second in the SEC Western Division. The Bulldogs lost three starters and four other lettermen. They also brought in five freshman recruits, finishing twelfth in Rivals.com team recruiting rankings.

=== Class of 2011 signees ===
College recruiting information
Name	Hometown	School	Height	Weight	Commit date
Rodney Hood; F	Meridian, Mississippi	Meridian HS	6 ft 8 in (2.03 m)	180 lb (82 kg)	Oct 27, 2010
Rodney Hood; F	Recruit ratings: Scout: Rivals: (96)				
D. J. Gardner; G	Okolona, Mississippi	Okolona HS	6 ft 6 in (1.98 m)	195 lb (88 kg)	Oct 29, 2010
D. J. Gardner; G	Recruit ratings: Scout: Rivals: (92)				
Deville Smith; G	Jackson, Mississippi	Callaway HS	5 ft 10 in (1.78 m)	165 lb (75 kg)	Apr 30, 2010
Deville Smith; G	Recruit ratings: Scout: Rivals: (91)				
Shawn Long; F	Morgan City, Louisiana	Morgan City HS	6 ft 9 in (2.06 m)	220 lb (100 kg)	May 20, 2010
Shawn Long; F	Recruit ratings: Scout: Rivals: (40)				
Roquez Johnson; F	Montgomery, Alabama	Carver HS	6 ft 7 in (2.01 m)	210 lb (95 kg)	Apr 29, 2011
Roquez Johnson; F	Recruit ratings: Scout: Rivals: (88)				
Overall recruit ranking: Scout: 14 Rivals: 12 ESPN: 22
Note: In many cases, Scout, Rivals, 247Sports, On3, and ESPN may conflict in their listings of height and weight.; In these cases, the average was taken. ESPN grades are on a 100-point scale.; Sources: "Mississippi State Basketball Commitments". Rivals.; "2011 Mississippi State Basketball Commits". Scout.; "ESPN". ESPN.; "Scout.com Team Recruiting Rankings". Scout.; "2011 Team Ranking". Rivals.

== Roster ==
2011–12 Mississippi State Bulldogs men's basketball team
Players
Coaches

Pos.	#	Name	Height	Weight	Year	Hometown
G	0	Jalen Steele	6 ft 3 in (1.91 m)	190 lb (86 kg)	So	Knoxville, TN
F	1	Renardo Sidney	6 ft 10 in (2.08 m)	270 lb (122 kg)	Jr	Jackson, MS
G	3	Dee Bost	6 ft 2 in (1.88 m)	176 lb (80 kg)	Sr	Concord, NC
G	4	Rodney Hood	6 ft 8 in (2.03 m)	180 lb (82 kg)	Fr	Meridian, MS
G	10	Shaunessy Smith	6 ft 6 in (1.98 m)	207 lb (94 kg)	RS So	Macon, MS
G	11	Reed Clayton	5 ft 9 in (1.75 m)	150 lb (68 kg)	So	Tupelo, MS
G	12	Charles Parker	5 ft 10 in (1.78 m)	168 lb (76 kg)	Jr	McKinney, TX
G	15	Baxter Price	5 ft 9 in (1.75 m)	156 lb (71 kg)	Jr	Brandon, MS
F	20	Taylor Luczak	6 ft 8 in (2.03 m)	195 lb (88 kg)	Sr	Glen Falls, NY
F	21	Shawn Long	6 ft 10 in (2.08 m)	225 lb (102 kg)	Fr	Morgan City, LA
G	22	Brian Bryant	6 ft 3 in (1.91 m)	160 lb (73 kg)	Jr	Albany, GA
F	23	Arnett Moultrie	6 ft 11 in (2.11 m)	230 lb (104 kg)	RS Jr	Memphis, TN
F	25	Roquez Johnson	6 ft 7 in (2.01 m)	210 lb (95 kg)	Fr	Montgomery, AL
C	30	Wendell Lewis	6 ft 9 in (2.06 m)	253 lb (115 kg)	Jr	Selma, AL
G	33	Deville Smith	5 ft 11 in (1.8 m)	160 lb (73 kg)	Fr	Jackson, MS

Head coach

- Rick Stansbury (Campbellsville)

Assistant coach(es)

- George Brooks (Mississippi State)
- Phil Cunningham (Campbellsville)
- Marcus Grant (Mississippi State)

Legend

- (C) Team captain
- (S) Suspended
- (I) Ineligible
- (W) Walk-on
- Injured
- Current redshirt

Source: 2011–12 Roster

=== Depth chart ===
Pos.	Starting 5	Bench
C	Arnett Moultrie	Wendell Lewis
PF	Renardo Sidney	Roquez Johnson
SF	Rodney Hood	Shaun Smith
SG	Brian Bryant	Jalen Steele
PG	Dee Bost	Deville Smith

== Schedule and results ==
Date time, TV	Rank^{#}	Opponent^{#}	Result	Record	High points	High rebounds	High assists	Site (attendance) city, state
Exhibition
Oct. 29, 2011*; 2:00 p.m.		Florida Tech	W 97–63		–	–	–	Humphrey Coliseum; Starkville, MS
Nov. 4, 2011*; 7:00 p.m.		Pikeville	W 94–70		–	–	–	Humphrey Coliseum; Starkville, MS
Non-conference regular season
Nov. 7, 2011*; 7:00 p.m.		Eastern Kentucky; 2K Sports Classic – Regionals	W 76–66	1–0	23 – Bost	10 – Moultrie	6 – Bost	Humphrey Coliseum (6,516); Starkville, MS
Nov. 9, 2011*; 9:00 p.m., ESPN		Akron; 2K Sports Classic – Regionals	L 58–68	1–1	13 – Bost	15 – Moultrie	2 – Bost	Humphrey Coliseum (6,897); Starkville, MS
Nov. 12, 2011*; 1:00 p.m.		South Alabama	W 80–65	2–1	28 – Moultrie	13 – Moultrie	4 – Bryant	Humphrey Coliseum (5,414); Starkville, MS
Nov. 17, 2011*; 6:00 p.m., ESPN2		vs. No. 19 Texas A&M; 2K Sports Classic – Semifinals	W 69–60	3–1	20 – Bost	8 – Moultrie	2 – Tied	Madison Square Garden (NA); New York, NY
Nov. 18, 2011*; 6:30 p.m., ESPN2		vs. No. 15 Arizona; 2K Sports Classic – Championship	W 67–57	4–1	19 – Moultrie	10 – Moultrie	6 – Bost	Madison Square Garden (NA); New York, NY
Nov. 21, 2011*; 7:00 p.m.	No. 24	Louisiana–Monroe	W 78–63	5–1	21 – Bost	10 – Bryant	5 – Tied	Humphrey Coliseum (7,547); Starkville, MS
Nov. 25, 2011*; 7:00 p.m.	No. 24	Tennessee-Martin	W 76–50	6–1	17 – Tied	11 – Lewis	3 – Tied	Humphrey Coliseum (6,409); Starkville, MS
Nov. 27, 2011*; 1:30 p.m.	No. 24	North Texas	W 82–59	7–1	20 – Moultrie	9 – Moultrie	5 – Bost	Humphrey Coliseum (7,418); Starkville, MS
Dec. 3, 2011*; 8:00 p.m., ESPNU	No. 21	West Virginia; SEC–Big East Challenge	W 75–62	8–1	21 – Moultrie	13 – Moultrie	7 – Bost	Humphrey Coliseum (7,529); Starkville, MS
Dec. 10, 2011*; 3:00 p.m., CSS	No. 17	Troy	W 106–68	9–1	28 – Bost	12 – Moultrie	9 – Bost	Humphrey Coliseum (7,742); Starkville, MS
Dec. 13, 2011*; 8:00 p.m., CSS	No. 17	Florida Atlantic	W 75–68	10–1	22 – Bost	15 – Hood	3 – Bost	Humphrey Coliseum (7,390); Starkville, MS
Dec. 17, 2011*; 11:00 a.m.	No. 17	at Detroit	W 80–75	11–1	17 – Tied	15 – Moultrie	5 – Bost	Calihan Hall (2,217); Detroit, MI
Dec. 22, 2011*; 7:00 p.m.	No. 18	vs. Northwestern State	W 82–67	12–1	24 – Moultrie	14 – Moultrie	4 – Moultrie	Mississippi Coliseum (6,330); Jackson, MS
Dec. 28, 2011*; 8:00 p.m., ESPN2	No. 15	vs. No. 6 Baylor	L 52–54	12–2	10 – Tied	10 – Moultrie	5 – Bost	American Airlines Center (6,707); Dallas, TX
Dec. 31, 2011*; 1:00 p.m.	No. 15	Utah State	W 66–64	13–2	16 – Hood	10 – Moultrie	6 – Tied	Humphrey Coliseum (7,385); Starkville, MS
SEC Regular Season
Jan. 7, 2012; 8:00 p.m., CSS	No. 15	at Arkansas	L 88–98	13–3 (0–1)	–	–	–	Bud Walton Arena; Fayetteville, AR
Jan. 12, 2012; 8:00 p.m., ESPN	No. 20	Tennessee	W 62–58	14–3 (1–1)	–	–	–	Humphrey Coliseum; Starkville, MS
Jan. 14, 2012; 3:00 p.m., SECN	No. 20	Alabama	W 56–52	15–3 (2–1)	–	–	–	Humphrey Coliseum; Starkville, MS
Jan. 18, 2012; 8:00 p.m., ESPN	No. 18	at Ole Miss	L 68–75	15–4 (2–2)	–	–	–	Tad Smith Coliseum; Oxford, MS
Jan. 21, 2012; 6:00 p.m., ESPN2	No. 18	at Vanderbilt	W 78–77 ^{OT}	16–4 (3–2)	–	–	–	Memorial Gymnasium; Nashville, TN
Jan. 25, 2012; 7:00 p.m., SECN	No. 18	LSU	W 76–71	17–4 (4–2)	–	–	–	Humphrey Coliseum; Starkville, MS
Jan. 28, 2012; 12:30 p.m., SECN	No. 18	at No. 14 Florida	L 57–69	17–5 (4–3)	–	–	–	O'Connell Center; Gainesville, FL
Feb. 4, 2012; 3:00 p.m., SECN	No. 22	Auburn	W 91–88	18–5 (5–3)	–	–	–	Humphrey Coliseum (9,026); Starkville, MS
Feb. 9, 2012; 6:00 p.m., ESPN	No. 20	Ole Miss	W 70–60	19–5 (6–3)	–	–	–	Humphrey Coliseum; Starkville, MS
Feb. 11, 2012; 12:30 p.m., SECN	No. 20	Georgia	L 68–70 ^{OT}	19–6 (6–4)	–	–	–	Humphrey Coliseum; Starkville, MS
Feb. 14, 2012; 8:00 p.m., ESPNU		at LSU	L 67–69 ^{OT}	19–7 (6–5)	–	–	–	Maravich Assembly Center; Baton Rouge, LA
Feb. 18, 2012; 4:00 p.m., FSN		at Auburn	L 55–65	19–8 (6–6)	–	–	–	Auburn Arena; Auburn, AL
Feb. 21, 2012; 8:00 p.m., ESPN		No. 1 Kentucky	L 64–73	19–9 (6–7)	–	–	–	Humphrey Coliseum; Starkville, MS
Feb. 25, 2012; 5:00 p.m., ESPN		at Alabama	L 50–67	19–10 (6–8)	–	–	–	Coleman Coliseum; Tuscaloosa, AL
Feb. 29, 2012; 7:00 p.m., SECN		at South Carolina	W 69–67 ^{OT}	20–10 (7–8)	–	–	–	Colonial Life Arena; Columbia, SC
Mar. 3, 2012; 4:00 p.m., FSN		Arkansas	W 79–59	21–10 (8–8)	–	–	–	Humphrey Coliseum; Starkville, MS
2012 SEC tournament
Mar. 8, 2012; 9:00 p.m., SECN	No. (6)	vs. (11) Georgia; First round	L 61–71	21–11	–	–	–	New Orleans Arena; New Orleans, LA
National Invitation Tournament
Mar. 13, 2012; 6:00 p.m., ESPN2	No. (4)	vs. (5) Massachusetts; First round	L 96–101 ^{2OT}	21–12	–	–	–	Humphrey Coliseum; Starkville, MS
*Non-conference game. ^{#}Rankings from AP Poll. (#) Tournament seedings in parentheses. All times are in Central Time (#) Tournament seedings in parentheses.
