= 2011–12 Vanderbilt Commodores men's basketball team =

American college basketball season

2011–12 Vanderbilt Commodores men's basketball

SEC tournament champions

NCAA tournament, Round of 32
- Conference: Southeastern Conference

Ranking
- Coaches: No. 19
- AP: No. 20
- Record: 25–11 (10–6 SEC)
- Head coach: Kevin Stallings (13th season)
- Assistant coaches: Brad Frederick (13th season); Dan Muller (12th season); Tom Richardson (9th season); David Cason (1st season)
- Home arena: Memorial Gymnasium

2011–12 Southeastern Conference men's basketball standings
	Conf.				Overall
Team	W		L	PCT	W		L	PCT
No. 1 Kentucky	16	–	0	1.000	38	–	2	.950
No. 25 Florida	10	–	6	.625	26	–	11	.703
No. 20 Vanderbilt †	10	–	6	.625	25	–	11	.694
Tennessee	10	–	6	.625	19	–	15	.559
Alabama	9	–	7	.563	21	–	12	.636
Mississippi State	8	–	8	.500	21	–	12	.636
Ole Miss	8	–	8	.500	20	–	14	.588
LSU	7	–	9	.438	18	–	15	.545
Arkansas	6	–	10	.375	18	–	14	.563
Auburn	5	–	11	.313	15	–	16	.484
Georgia	5	–	11	.313	15	–	17	.469
South Carolina	2	–	14	.125	10	–	21	.323
† 2012 SEC tournament winner As of April 2, 2012; Rankings from AP poll

The 2011–12 Vanderbilt Commodores men's basketball team represented Vanderbilt University during the 2011–12 NCAA Division I men's basketball season. The Commodores, members of the Southeastern Conference, were coached by Kevin Stallings, and celebrated their 60th season in their current home arena, Memorial Gymnasium. After a 21–10 regular season that fell short of lofty preseason expectations, the Commodores captured their first SEC Tournament Championship in 61 seasons on March 11, 2012, by defeating Georgia, Ole Miss, and top-ranked Kentucky in consecutive days. In the 2012 NCAA tournament they defeated Harvard in the second round before falling in the third round to Wisconsin to finish the season 25–11.

== Before the season ==
The Commodores came off a 2010–11 season that ended with a second-round (first game) upset by Richmond in the NCAA tournament. This continued a recent history of tournament disappointments for Vanderbilt, whose last three NCAA appearances had all ended with a first-game loss to a double-digit seed.

During the offseason, the coaching staff saw one change when assistant King Rice was hired as head coach at Monmouth. Rice was replaced by David Cason, a former player under Stallings at Illinois State who had spent the previous six seasons as an assistant with Tulsa.

=== Class of 2011 signees ===
College recruiting
Name	Hometown	School	Height	Weight	Commit date
Kedren Johnson; PG	Lewisburg, Tennessee	Marshall County	6 ft 4 in (1.93 m)	195 lb (88 kg)	Sep 22, 2010
Kedren Johnson; PG	Recruit ratings: Scout: Rivals: (93)				
Shelby Moats; PF	Waconia, Minnesota	Waconia	6 ft 7.5 in (2.02 m)	225 lb (102 kg)	Sep 26, 2010
Shelby Moats; PF	Recruit ratings: Scout: Rivals: (89)				
Dai-Jon Parker; SG	Alpharetta, Georgia	Milton	6 ft 3 in (1.91 m)	175 lb (79 kg)	Nov 5, 2010
Dai-Jon Parker; SG	Recruit ratings: Scout: Rivals: (96)				
Overall recruit ranking: Scout: 23 Rivals: 30
Note: In many cases, Scout, Rivals, 247Sports, On3, and ESPN may conflict in their listings of height and weight.; In these cases, the average was taken. ESPN grades are on a 100-point scale.; Sources: "Vanderbilt 2011 Basketball Commitments". Rivals.; "2011 Vanderbilt Basketball Commits". Scout.; "ESPN". ESPN.; "Scout.com Team Recruiting Rankings". Scout.; "2011 Team Ranking". Rivals.

== 2011–12 outlook ==
In a major offseason development, three of the Commodores' most important players—Festus Ezeli, John Jenkins, and Jeffery Taylor—all spurned the NBA draft and announced they would return for the 2011–12 season. Jenkins, the SEC's leading scorer in 2010–11 at 19.5 points per game, was chosen for the All-SEC first team. Ezeli, who averaged 13 points, 6.3 rebounds, and 2.6 blocks in a breakout season, was named to the All-SEC second team, and was also named by multiple sources as one of the most improved players in the country. Taylor averaged 14.7 points while being named to the All-SEC second team, as well as the SEC All-Defensive Team. Ezeli, Jenkins, and Taylor were all named by Basketball Prospectus in its 2011–12 preseason outlook as among the top 20 players in college basketball, making Vanderbilt the only Division I men's team with three top-20 performers.

These decisions meant that Vanderbilt would return all five of its starters from last season, all of them seniors except for Jenkins, a junior. Another returning starter, point guard Brad Tinsley, led the SEC in assists in 2010–11 with 4.6 per game.

The Commodores thus were widely projected as a preseason top-10 team, with ESPN's Hall of Fame commentator Dick Vitale going so far as to rank them #5 in his preseason top 40.

Less than a month before the start of the season, the NCAA suspended Ezeli 6 games after accepting a meal and hotel room from a Vanderbilt alumnus during a summer trip. He was able to practice with the team during the suspension, and was also eligible to play in the team's preseason exhibition game (but was unable to play in that game). Ezeli came off his suspension for the Xavier game on November 28; however, he suffered a sprained knee during a late-October practice, and did not return until the Davidson game on December 7.

== Roster ==
2011–12 Vanderbilt Commodores men's basketball team
Players
Coaches

Pos.	#	Name	Height	Weight	Year	Previous school	Hometown
G	1	Brad Tinsley	6 ft 3 in (1.91 m)	210 lb (95 kg)	Sr	Oregon City	Oregon City, OR
G	2	Kedren Johnson	6 ft 4 in (1.93 m)	215 lb (98 kg)	Fr	Marshall County	Lewisburg, TN
C	3	Festus Ezeli	6 ft 11 in (2.11 m)	255 lb (116 kg)	RS Sr	Igbinedion Education Center	Benin City, Nigeria
G/F	5	Lance Goulbourne	6 ft 8 in (2.03 m)	230 lb (104 kg)	Sr	The Hun School (Princeton, New Jersey)	Brooklyn, NY
G	11	Kyle Fuller	6 ft 1 in (1.85 m)	200 lb (91 kg)	So	Rancho Verde	Moreno Valley, CA
G/F	12	Jordan Smart	6 ft 6 in (1.98 m)	200 lb (91 kg)	RS Jr	Lexington Catholic	Lexington, KY
F	14	Aaron Noll	6 ft 7 in (2.01 m)	220 lb (100 kg)	Sr	Covington Catholic	Fort Mitchell, KY
G	23	John Jenkins	6 ft 4 in (1.93 m)	220 lb (100 kg)	Jr	Station Camp	Hendersonville, TN
G	24	Dai-Jon Parker	6 ft 3 in (1.91 m)	190 lb (86 kg)	Fr	Milton (Milton, GA)	Baton Rouge, LA
F	33	Steve Tchiengang	6 ft 9 in (2.06 m)	245 lb (111 kg)	Sr	Montverde Academy (Montverde, FL)	Douala, Cameroon
F	34	Shelby Moats	6 ft 8 in (2.03 m)	225 lb (102 kg)	Fr	Waconia	Waconia, MN
F	35	James Siakam	6 ft 6 in (1.98 m)	201 lb (91 kg)	RS Fr	Brehm Prep (Carbondale, IL)	Douala, Cameroon
C	40	Josh Henderson	6 ft 11 in (2.11 m)	230 lb (104 kg)	RS Fr	Cave Spring	Roanoke, VA
G/F	44	Jeffery Taylor	6 ft 7 in (2.01 m)	225 lb (102 kg)	Sr	Hobbs (Hobbs, NM)	Norrköping, Sweden
F	45	Rod Odom	6 ft 9 in (2.06 m)	215 lb (98 kg)	So	Middlesex School (Concord, MA)	Central Islip, NY

Head coach

- Kevin Stallings (Purdue)

Assistant coach(es)

- Brad Frederick (North Carolina)
- Dan Muller (Illinois State)
- Tom Richardson (St. Xavier (IL))
- David Cason (Illinois State)

Legend

- (C) Team captain
- (S) Suspended
- (I) Ineligible
- (W) Walk-on
- Injured
- Current redshirt

Roster
Last update: 2011-08-19

== Schedule ==
Date time, TV	Rank^{#}	Opponent^{#}	Result	Record	High points	High rebounds	High assists	Site (attendance) city, state
Exhibition
Nov. 7, 2011*; 7:00 p.m.	No. 7	Xavier (LA)	W 102–67		17 – Taylor	8 – Goulbourne	4 – Fuller	Memorial Gymnasium (11,844); Nashville, TN
Regular season
Nov. 11, 2011*; 9:00 p.m., FSN	No. 7	Oregon	W 78–64	1–0	24 – Jenkins	11 – Taylor	4 – Taylor	Memorial Gymnasium (14,316); Nashville, TN
Nov. 13, 2011*; 1:00 p.m., ESPNU	No. 7	Cleveland State; Legends Classic – Preliminary round	L 58–71	1–1	17 – Jenkins	11 – Tchiengang	2 – Tied	Memorial Gymnasium (13,503); Nashville, TN
Nov. 15, 2011*; 7:00 p.m.	No. 18	Bucknell; Legends Classic – Preliminary round	W 80–68	2–1	17 – Taylor	9 – Goulbourne	4 – Henderson	Memorial Gymnasium (12,543); Nashville, TN
Nov. 19, 2011*; 5:30 p.m., ESPN3	No. 18	vs. NC State; Legends Classic – Semifinal	W 86–79	3–1	28 – Jenkins	11 – Tchiengang	5 – Taylor	Izod Center; East Rutherford, NJ
Nov. 21, 2011*; 9:00 p.m., ESPN3	No. 18	vs. Oregon State; Legends Classic – Championship						Izod Center (3,294); East Rutherford, NJ
Nov. 25, 2011*; 8:00 p.m.	No. 18	Monmouth	W 95–73	5–1	18 – Jenkins	10 – Goulbourne	5 – Taylor	Memorial Gymnasium (12,807); Nashville, TN
Nov. 28, 2011*; 6:00 p.m., ESPN2	No. 20	No. 11 Xavier	L 70–82 ^{OT}	5–2	20 – Jenkins	7 – Tied	7 – Tinsley	Memorial Gymnasium (14,316); Nashville, TN
Dec. 2, 2011*; 7:30 p.m., ESPN	No. 20	at No. 6 Louisville; SEC–Big East Challenge	L 60–62 ^{OT}	5–3	27 – Jenkins	8 – Goulbourne	5 – Tinsley	KFC Yum! Center (22,728); Louisville, KY
Dec. 7, 2011*; 6:00 p.m.		at Davidson	W 87–83	6–3	30 – Taylor	7 – Goulbourne	3 – Johnson	John M. Belk Arena (4,475); Davidson, NC
Dec. 17, 2011*; 4:30 p.m., CSS	No. 25	Indiana State	L 55–61	6–4	21 – Taylor	6 – Tied	3 – Tinsley	Memorial Gymnasium (13,310); Nashville, TN
Dec. 19, 2011*; 7:00 p.m.		Longwood	W 99–71	7–4	29 – Taylor	10 – Goulbourne	3 – Tinsley	Memorial Gymnasium (12,886); Nashville, TN
Dec. 21, 2011*; 7:00 p.m., FSN		Lafayette	W 89–58	8–4	27 – Jenkins	9 – Tchiengang	10 – Tinsley	Memorial Gymnasium (13,034); Nashville, TN
Dec. 29, 2011*; 8:00 p.m., ESPN2		at No. 14 Marquette	W 74–57	9–4	19 – Taylor	16 – Goulbourne	8 – Tinsley	Bradley Center (15,684); Milwaukee, WI
Jan. 2, 2012*; 7:00 p.m.		Miami (OH)	W 69–62	10–4	26 – Jenkins	7 – Ezeli	4 – Tinsley	Memorial Gymnasium (13,162); Nashville, TN
Jan. 7, 2012; 12:30 p.m., SECN		Auburn	W 65–35	11–4 (1–0)	17 – Jenkins	8 – Ezeli	6 – Tinsley	Memorial Gymnasium (13,473); Nashville, TN
Jan. 10, 2012; 8:00 p.m., ESPNU		at South Carolina	W 67–57	12–4 (2–0)	14 – Jenkins	10 – Goulbourne	9 – Tinsley	Colonial Life Arena (8,353); Columbia, SC
Jan. 14, 2012; 3:00 p.m., SECN		Georgia	W 77–66	13–4 (3–0)	18 – Jenkins	9 – Taylor	4 – Tinsley	Memorial Gymnasium (14,316); Nashville, TN
Jan. 19, 2012; 6:00 p.m., ESPN		at Alabama	W 69–59	14–4 (4–0)	20 – Jenkins	10 – Ezeli	4 – Tinsley	Coleman Coliseum (12,202); Tuscaloosa, AL
Jan. 21, 2012; 6:00 p.m., ESPN2		No. 18 Mississippi State	L 77–78 ^{OT}	14–5 (4–1)	21 – Jenkins	14 – Ezeli	5 – Tinsley	Memorial Gymnasium (14,316); Nashville, TN
Jan. 24, 2012; 6:00 p.m., ESPNU		Tennessee; Super Tuesday	W 65–47	15–5 (5–1)	23 – Taylor	9 – Ezeli	4 – Tinsley	Memorial Gymnasium (14,316); Nashville, TN
Jan. 28, 2012*; 1:00 p.m.		Middle Tennessee	W 84–77	16–5	26 – Jenkins	8 – Goulbourne	4 – Tinsley	Memorial Gymnasium (14,316); Nashville, TN
Jan. 31, 2012; 8:00 p.m., ESPN	No. 25	at Arkansas	L 74–82	16–6 (5–2)	19 – Jenkins	6 – Taylor	6 – Tinsley	Bud Walton Arena (13,678); Fayetteville, AR
Feb. 4, 2012; 12:00 p.m., CBS	No. 25	at No. 12 Florida	L 65–73	16–7 (5–3)	25 – Taylor	11 – Goulbourne	6 – Tinsley	O'Connell Center (11,270); Gainesville, FL
Feb. 8, 2012; 8:00 p.m., CSS		LSU	W 76–61	17–7 (6–3)	21 – Ezeli	6 – Tied	5 – Tinsley	Memorial Gymnasium (13,610); Nashville, TN
Feb. 11, 2012; 8:00 p.m., ESPN		No. 1 Kentucky; ESPN College GameDay	L 63–69	17–8 (6–4)	15 – Jenkins	9 – Taylor	4 – Tied	Memorial Gymnasium (14,316); Nashville, TN
Feb. 16, 2012; 8:00 p.m., ESPN2		at Ole Miss	W 102–76	18–8 (7–4)	28 – Taylor	9 – Taylor	4 – Tinsley	Tad Smith Coliseum (5,954); Oxford, MS
Feb. 19, 2012; 12:00 p.m., FSN		at Georgia	W 61–52	19–8 (8–4)	28 – Jenkins	6 – Goulbourne	2 – Tied	Stegeman Coliseum (7,823); Athens, GA
Feb. 22, 2012; 7:00 p.m., SECN		South Carolina	W 59–48	20–8 (9–4)	21 – Jenkins	8 – Goulbourne	5 – Tinsley	Memorial Gymnasium (14,316); Nashville, TN
Feb. 25, 2012; 11:00 a.m., CBS		at No. 1 Kentucky	L 74–83	20–9 (9–5)	19 – Taylor	9 – Taylor	2 – Johnson	Rupp Arena (24,388); Lexington, KY
Feb. 28, 2012; 8:00 p.m., ESPN		No. 16 Florida; Super Tuesday/Senior Night	W 77–67	21–9 (10–5)	22 – Jenkins	6 – Taylor	4 – Tinsley	Memorial Gymnasium (14,316); Nashville, TN
Mar. 3, 2012; 3:00 p.m., ESPN		at Tennessee	L 61–68	21–10 (10–6)	18 – Jenkins	7 – Goulbourne	4 – Tied	Thompson–Boling Arena (22,172); Knoxville, TN
2012 SEC tournament
Mar. 9, 2012; 9:00 p.m., SECN	No. (3)	vs. (11) Georgia; Quarterfinals	W 63–41	22–10	15 – Jenkins	6 – Goulbourne	3 – Tinsley	New Orleans Arena (10,526); New Orleans, LA
Mar. 10, 2012; 3:30 p.m., ABC	No. (3)	vs. (7) Ole Miss; Semifinalfinals	W 63–41	23–10	23 – Jenkins	12 – Goulbourne	3 – Tied	New Orleans Arena (18,523); New Orleans, LA
Mar. 11, 2012; 12:00 p.m., ABC	No. (3)	vs. (1) Kentucky; Championship	W 71–64	24–10	18 – Taylor	11 – Taylor	4 – Tinsley	New Orleans Arena (18,114); New Orleans, LA
2012 NCAA tournament
Mar. 15, 2012; 3:40 p.m., TNT	No. 20 (5)	vs. (12) Harvard; First Round	W 79–70	25–10	27 – Jenkins	11 – Ezeli	4 – Tinsley	The Pit (10,774); Albuquerque, New Mexico
Mar. 17, 2012; 5:10 p.m., TNT	No. 20 (5)	vs. No. 14 (4) Wisconsin; Second Round	L 57–60	25–11	14 – Ezeli	11 – Tied	2 – Goulbourne	The Pit (12,128); Albuquerque, New Mexico
*Non-conference game. ^{#}Rankings from AP Poll. (#) Tournament seedings in parentheses. All times are in Central Time (#) Tournament seedings in parentheses.
