= 2011–12 Oregon Ducks men's basketball team =

American college basketball season

2011–12 Oregon Ducks men's basketball

NIT, Quarterfinals
- Conference: Pac-12 Conference
- Record: 24–10 (13–5 Pac-12)
- Head coach: Dana Altman
- Assistant coaches: Brian Fish; Kevin McKenna; Tony Stubblefield
- Home arena: Matthew Knight Arena

2011–12 Pac-12 Conference men's basketball standings
	Conf.				Overall
Team	W		L	PCT	W		L	PCT
Washington	14	–	4	.778	24	–	11	.686
California	13	–	5	.722	24	–	10	.706
Oregon	13	–	5	.722	24	–	10	.706
Arizona	12	–	6	.667	23	–	12	.657
Colorado †	11	–	7	.611	24	–	12	.667
UCLA	11	–	7	.611	19	–	14	.576
Stanford	10	–	8	.556	26	–	11	.703
Oregon State	7	–	11	.389	21	–	15	.583
Washington State	7	–	11	.389	19	–	18	.514
Arizona State	6	–	12	.333	10	–	21	.323
Utah	3	–	15	.167	6	–	25	.194
USC	1	–	17	.056	6	–	26	.188
† Conference tournament winner As of March 8, 2012; Rankings from AP poll

The 2011–12 Oregon Ducks men's basketball team represented the University of Oregon during the 2011–12 NCAA Division I men's basketball season. The Ducks, led by their 2nd year head coach Dana Altman, are members of the Pac-12 Conference and played their first full season in Matthew Knight Arena, which opened in the middle of the previous season. They finished the season 24–10, 13–5 in Pac-12 play to finish in a tie for second place. They lost in the quarterfinals of the Pac-12 Basketball tournament to Colorado. They were invited to the 2012 National Invitation Tournament where they defeated LSU in the first round and Iowa in the second round before falling in the quarterfinals to fellow Pac-12 member and rival Washington.

== Recruits ==
College recruiting information
Name	Hometown	School	Height	Weight	Commit date
Jabari Brown; SG	Oakland, California	Oakland	6 ft 3 in (1.91 m)	200 lb (91 kg)	Oct 7, 2010
Jabari Brown; SG	Recruit ratings: Scout: Rivals: (96)				
Brett Kingma; SG	Mill Creek, Washington	Henry M. Jackson	6 ft 1 in (1.85 m)	165 lb (75 kg)	Sep 25, 2010
Brett Kingma; SG	Recruit ratings: Scout: Rivals: (90)				
Bruce Barron; PG	Carbondale, Illinois	Brehm Prep	6 ft 2 in (1.88 m)	200 lb (91 kg)	Sep 25, 2010
Bruce Barron; PG	Recruit ratings: Scout: Rivals: (89)				
Austin Kuemper; PF	Portland, Oregon	Westview	6 ft 9 in (2.06 m)	215 lb (98 kg)	Sep 7, 2010
Austin Kuemper; PF	Recruit ratings: Scout: Rivals: (89)				
Carlos Emory; PF	Bloomington, Minnesota	Howard College	6 ft 7 in (2.01 m)	225 lb (102 kg)	Mar 15, 2011
Carlos Emory; PF	Recruit ratings: Scout: Rivals: (79)				
Chris Lawson; C	Moline, Illinois	Black Hawk College	6 ft 11 in (2.11 m)	N/A	Jun 6, 2011
Chris Lawson; C	Recruit ratings: No ratings found				
Overall recruit ranking: Scout: nr Rivals: nr ESPN: nr
Note: In many cases, Scout, Rivals, 247Sports, On3, and ESPN may conflict in their listings of height and weight.; In these cases, the average was taken. ESPN grades are on a 100-point scale.; Sources: "ESPN". ESPN.; "2011 Team Ranking". Rivals.

== Roster ==
2011–12 Oregon Ducks men's basketball team
Players
Coaches

Pos.	#	Name	Height	Weight	Year	Hometown
G	1	Bruce Baron	6 ft 3 in (1.91 m)	200 lb (91 kg)	Fr	Carbondale, Illinois
G	3	Garrett Sim	6 ft 1 in (1.85 m)	181 lb (82 kg)	RS Sr	Portland, Oregon
G	4	Nicholas Lucenti	6 ft 3 in (1.91 m)	212 lb (96 kg)	So	Los Angeles, California
F	5	Olu Ashaolu	6 ft 7 in (2.01 m)	220 lb (100 kg)	RS Sr	Toronto, Ontario
G	10	Johnathan Loyd	5 ft 8 in (1.73 m)	160 lb (73 kg)	So	Las Vegas, Nevada
G	12	Brett Kingma	6 ft 1 in (1.85 m)	165 lb (75 kg)	Fr	Mill Creek, Washington
F	23	Jeremy Jacob	6 ft 8 in (2.03 m)	226 lb (103 kg)	RS Sr	Baton Rouge, Louisiana
F	25	E. J. Singler	6 ft 6 in (1.98 m)	210 lb (95 kg)	Jr	Medford, Oregon
F	31	Tyrone Nared	6 ft 8 in (2.03 m)	210 lb (95 kg)	Sr	Woonsocket, Rhode Island
G	32	Jabari Brown	6 ft 4 in (1.93 m)	200 lb (91 kg)	RS Fr	Oakland, California
F	33	Carlos Emory	6 ft 7 in (2.01 m)	225 lb (102 kg)	Jr	Bloomington, Minnesota
G	34	Devoe Joseph	6 ft 4 in (1.93 m)	180 lb (82 kg)	RS Sr	Pickering, Ontario
C	40	Austin Kuemper	6 ft 9 in (2.06 m)	240 lb (109 kg)	Fr	Portland, Oregon
C	42	Chris Larson	6 ft 11 in (2.11 m)	220 lb (100 kg)	RS Jr	Hudson, Iowa
C	55	Tony Woods	6 ft 11 in (2.11 m)	250 lb (113 kg)	RS Jr	Rome, Georgia

Head coach

- Dana Altman (Eastern New Mexico)

Assistant coach(es)

- Brian Fish (Marshall)
- Kevin McKenna (Creighton)
- Tony Stubblefield (Omaha)

Legend

- (C) Team captain
- (S) Suspended
- (I) Ineligible
- (W) Walk-on
- Injured
- Current redshirt

== Schedule ==
Date time, TV	Rank^{#}	Opponent^{#}	Result	Record	Site (attendance) city, state
Exhibition
11/02/2011*; 7:00 PM		Grand Canyon	W 82–75	–	Matthew Knight Arena (6,271); Eugene, OR
11/06/2011*; 3:00 PM		Lewis–Clark State	W 100–58	–	Matthew Knight Arena (6,359); Eugene, OR
Non-conference regular season
11/11/2011*; 7:00 PM, FSN		at No. 7 Vanderbilt	L 64–78	0–1	Memorial Gymnasium (14,316); Nashville, TN
11/17/2011*; 7:00 PM, CSNNW		Eastern Washington	W 73–65	1–1	Matthew Knight Arena (6,096); Eugene, OR
11/20/2011*; 2:00 PM		Southeast Missouri State	W 86–61	2–1	Matthew Knight Arena (6,859); Eugene, OR
11/23/2011*; 6:00 PM, BTN		at Nebraska	W 83–76	3–1	Bob Devaney Sports Center (10,881); Lincoln, NE
11/29/2011*; 7:00 PM, CSNNW		UTEP	W 64–59	4–1	Matthew Knight Arena (5,800); Eugene, OR
12/03/2011*; 2:00 PM, ESPNU		vs. BYU	L 65–79	4–2	EnergySolutions Arena (12,845); Salt Lake City, UT
12/10/2011*; 7:00 PM, CSNNW		Fresno State	W 74–70	5–2	Matthew Knight Arena (6,862); Eugene, OR
12/12/2011*; 7:00 PM, CSNNW		Portland State	W 79–70	6–2	Matthew Knight Arena (5,712); Eugene, OR
12/18/2011*; 2:30 PM, FSN		Virginia	L 54–67	6–3	Matthew Knight Arena (8,750); Eugene, OR
12/20/2011*; 7:00 PM		North Carolina Central; Global Sports Hoops Showcase	W 58–45	7–3	Matthew Knight Arena (5,655); Eugene, OR
12/21/2011*; 7:00 PM		Prairie View A&M; Global Sports Hoops Showcase	W 74–66	8–3	Matthew Knight Arena (5,710); Eugene, OR
12/22/2011*; 7:00 PM		Stephen F. Austin; Global Sports Hoops Showcase	W 55–45	9–3	Matthew Knight Arena (3,401); Eugene, OR
Pac-12 regular season
12/29/2011; 6:00 PM, CSNNW		vs. Washington State	W 92–75	10–3 (1–0)	Spokane Arena (9,889); Spokane, WA
12/31/2011; 7:00 PM, ESPN2		at Washington	L 60–76	10–4 (1–1)	Alaska Airlines Arena (9,597); Seattle, WA
01/05/2012; 6:00 PM, CSNNW		Stanford	W 78–67	11–4 (2–1)	Matthew Knight Arena (6,199); Eugene, OR
01/08/2012; 4:30 PM, FSN		California	L 60–77	11–5 (2–2)	Matthew Knight Arena (7,415); Eugene, OR
01/12/2012; 7:30 PM, FSN		at Arizona State	W 67–58	12–5 (3–2)	Wells Fargo Arena (5,609); Tempe, AZ
01/14/2012; 12:30 PM, CBS		at Arizona	W 59–57	13–5 (4–2)	McKale Center (14,553); Tucson, AZ
01/19/2012; 5:30 PM, CSNNW		USC	W 65–62	14–5 (5–2)	Matthew Knight Arena (8,684); Eugene, OR
01/21/2012; 1:00 PM, FSN		UCLA	W 75–68	15–5 (6–2)	Matthew Knight Arena (10,830); Eugene, OR
01/29/2012; 3:30 PM, FSN		Oregon State; Civil War	L 71–76	15–6 (6–3)	Matthew Knight Arena (11,219); Eugene, OR
02/02/2012; 6:00 PM		at Utah	W 79–68	16–6 (7–3)	Jon M. Huntsman Center (8,024); Salt Lake City, UT
02/04/2012; 6:00 PM		at Colorado	L 71–72	16–7 (7–4)	Coors Events Center (11,052); Boulder, CO
02/09/2012; 8:00 PM, FSN		Washington	W 82–57	17–7 (8–4)	Matthew Knight Arena (9,035); Eugene, OR
02/11/2012; 3:00 PM		Washington State	W 78–69	18–7 (9–4)	Matthew Knight Arena (10,071); Eugene, OR
02/16/2012; 7:30 PM, CSNNW		at California	L 83–86	18–8 (9–5)	Haas Pavilion (9,980); Berkeley, CA
02/19/2012; 4:30 PM, FSN		at Stanford	W 68–64	19–8 (10–5)	Maples Pavilion (6,197); Stanford, CA
02/26/2012; 4:30 PM, FSN		at Oregon State; Civil War	W 74–73	20–8 (11–5)	Gill Coliseum (9,604); Corvallis, OR
03/01/2012; 7:30 PM, FSN		Colorado	W 90–81	21–8 (12–5)	Matthew Knight Arena (10,056); Eugene, OR
03/03/2012; 3:00 PM, CSNNW		Utah	W 94–48	22–8 (13–5)	Matthew Knight Arena (10,444); Eugene, OR
Pac-12 tournament
03/08/2012; 8:40 PM, FSN	(3)	vs. (6) Colorado; Quarterfinals	L 62–63	22–9	Staples Center (9,317); Los Angeles, CA
NIT
03/13/2012*; 6:30 PM, ESPN	(3)	(6) LSU; First Round	W 96–76	23–9	Matthew Knight Arena (5,158); Eugene, OR
03/18/2012*; 2:00 PM, ESPNU	(3)	(7) Iowa; Second Round	W 108–97	24–9	Matthew Knight Arena (7,590); Eugene, OR
03/20/2012*; 6:00 PM, ESPN	(3)	at (1) Washington; Quarterfinals	L 86–90	24–10	Alaska Airlines Arena (9,140); Seattle, WA
*Non-conference game. ^{#}Rankings from AP Poll. (#) Tournament seedings in parentheses. All times are in Pacific Time.
