= 2011–12 LSU Tigers basketball team =

American college basketball season

2011–12 LSU Tigers men's basketball

NIT, First Round
- Conference: Southeastern Conference
- Record: 18–15 (7–9 SEC)
- Head coach: Trent Johnson (4th season)
- Assistant coaches: Donny Guerinoni; Nick Robinson; Brent Scott
- Home arena: Pete Maravich Assembly Center

2011–12 Southeastern Conference men's basketball standings
	Conf.				Overall
Team	W		L	PCT	W		L	PCT
No. 1 Kentucky	16	–	0	1.000	38	–	2	.950
No. 25 Florida	10	–	6	.625	26	–	11	.703
No. 20 Vanderbilt †	10	–	6	.625	25	–	11	.694
Tennessee	10	–	6	.625	19	–	15	.559
Alabama	9	–	7	.563	21	–	12	.636
Mississippi State	8	–	8	.500	21	–	12	.636
Ole Miss	8	–	8	.500	20	–	14	.588
LSU	7	–	9	.438	18	–	15	.545
Arkansas	6	–	10	.375	18	–	14	.563
Auburn	5	–	11	.313	15	–	16	.484
Georgia	5	–	11	.313	15	–	17	.469
South Carolina	2	–	14	.125	10	–	21	.323
† 2012 SEC tournament winner As of April 2, 2012; Rankings from AP poll

The 2011–12 LSU Tigers basketball team represented Louisiana State University in the sport of basketball during the 2011–12 college basketball season. The Tigers competed in Division I of the National Collegiate Athletic Association (NCAA) and Southeastern Conference (SEC). They were led by head coach Trent Johnson, and played their home games at the Pete Maravich Assembly Center on the university's Baton Rouge, Louisiana campus.

== Previous season ==
The Tigers finished the 2010–11 season 11–21 overall, 3–13 in SEC play and lost in the first round of the SEC tournament to Vanderbilt.

== Roster ==
2011–12 LSU Tigers men's basketball team
Players
Coaches

Pos.	#	Name	Height	Weight	Year	Hometown
G	1	Anthony Hickey	5 ft 11 in (1.8 m)	182 lb (83 kg)	Fr	Hopkinsville, Kentucky
F	2	Johnny O'Bryant III	6 ft 9 in (2.06 m)	262 lb (119 kg)	Fr	Cleveland, Mississippi
G	4	Chris Bass	6 ft 1 in (1.85 m)	190 lb (86 kg)	Sr	Baton Rouge, Louisiana
F	5	Malcolm White	6 ft 9 in (2.06 m)	220 lb (100 kg)	Sr	Baton Rouge, Louisiana
G	10	Andre Stringer	5 ft 9 in (1.75 m)	180 lb (82 kg)	So	Jackson, Mississippi
G	12	Ronald Martin	6 ft 1 in (1.85 m)	180 lb (82 kg)	Fr	White Castle, Louisiana
F	13	Eddie Ludwig	6 ft 9 in (2.06 m)	210 lb (95 kg)	RS Jr	Metairie, Louisiana
F	14	Jalen Courtney	6 ft 8 in (2.03 m)	228 lb (103 kg)	So	Jackson, Mississippi
G	22	Ralston Turner	6 ft 6 in (1.98 m)	205 lb (93 kg)	RS So	Muscle Shoals, Alabama
F	24	Storm Warren	6 ft 7 in (2.01 m)	230 lb (104 kg)	Sr	Monroe, Louisiana
G	32	John Isaac	6 ft 3 in (1.91 m)	208 lb (94 kg)	Fr	Leesville, Louisiana
C	41	Justin Hamilton	7 ft 0 in (2.13 m)	260 lb (118 kg)	RS Jr	Alpine, Utah
C	55	Andrew Del Piero	7 ft 2 in (2.18 m)	257 lb (117 kg)	RS Jr	Austin, Texas

Head coach

- Trent Johnson (Boise State)

Assistant coach(es)

- Donny Guerinoni (Nevada)
- Nick Robinson (Stanford)
- Brent Scott (Rice)

Legend

- (C) Team captain
- (S) Suspended
- (I) Ineligible
- (W) Walk-on
- Injured
- Current redshirt

== Schedule ==
Date time, TV	Rank^{#}	Opponent^{#}	Result	Record	Site city, state
Regular season
November 12; 12:00 p.m.		Nicholls State	W 96–74	1–0	Maravich Assembly Center; Baton Rouge, Louisiana
November 15; 6:00 p.m.		at Coastal Carolina	L 63–71	1–1	Kimbel Arena; Conway, South Carolina
November 17; 2:00 p.m., ESPNU		vs. Northwestern; 2011 Charleston Classic	L 82–88	1–2	Carolina First Arena; Charleston, South Carolina
November 18; 1:00 p.m.		vs. WKU; 2011 Charleston Classic	W 76–57	2–2	Carolina First Arena; Charleston, South Carolina
November 20; 2:30 p.m.		vs. Georgia Tech; 2011 Charleston Classic 5th Place Game	W 59–50	3–2	Carolina First Arena; Charleston, South Carolina
November 23; 7:00 p.m., CST		South Alabama	L 75–79 ^{OT}	3–3	Maravich Assembly Center; Baton Rouge, Louisiana
November 29; 7:00 p.m., CBSSN		at Houston	W 59–58	4–3	Hofheinz Pavilion; Houston, Texas
December 3; 6:00 p.m., ESPNU		at Rutgers; SEC–Big East Challenge	W 59–50	5–3	Louis Brown Athletic Center; Piscataway, New Jersey
December 10; 7:00 p.m., CST		Boise State	W 64–45	6–3	Maravich Assembly Center; Baton Rouge, Louisiana
December 15; 7:00 p.m., CST		UC Irvine	W 66–59	7–3	Maravich Assembly Center; Baton Rouge, Louisiana
December 19; 8:00 p.m., FSN		No. 10 Marquette	W 67–59	8–3	Maravich Assembly Center; Baton Rouge, Louisiana
December 22; 7:00 p.m.		at North Texas	W 67–58	9–3	Super Pit; Denton, Texas
December 29; 6:00 p.m., CST		Grambling State	W 69–37	10–3	Maravich Assembly Center; Baton Rouge, Louisiana
January 2*; 6:00 p.m., CST		No. 21 Virginia	L 52–57	10–4	Maravich Assembly Center; Baton Rouge, Louisiana
SEC Regular Season
January 7; 12:30 p.m., SECN		Ole Miss	W 81–55	11–4 (1–0)	Maravich Assembly Center; Baton Rouge, Louisiana
January 11; 8:00 p.m., CSS		at Alabama	L 53–69	11–5 (1–1)	Coleman Coliseum; Tuscaloosa, AL
January 14; 8:00 p.m., FSN		at Arkansas	L 60–69	11–6 (1–2)	Bud Walton Arena; Fayetteville, Arkansas
January 17; 6:00 p.m., ESPNU		Auburn	W 65–58 ^{OT}	12–6 (2–2)	Maravich Assembly Center; Baton Rouge, Louisiana
January 21; 5:00 p.m., FSN		at No. 17 Florida	L 64–76	12–7 (2–3)	O'Connell Center; Gainesville, Florida
January 27; 7:00 p.m., SECN		at No. 18 Mississippi State	L 71–76	12–8 (2–4)	Humphrey Coliseum; Starkville, Mississippi
January 28; 3:00 p.m., SECN		No. 1 Kentucky	L 50–74	12–9 (2–5)	Maravich Assembly Center; Baton Rouge, Louisiana
February 4; 12:30 p.m., SECN		Arkansas	W 71–65	13–9 (3–5)	Maravich Assembly Center; Baton Rouge, Louisiana
February 8; 8:00 p.m., CSS		at Vanderbilt	L 61–76	13–10 (3–6)	Memorial Gym; Nashville, Tennessee
February 11; 6:00 p.m., ESPN2		Alabama	W 67–58	14–10 (4–6)	Maravich Assembly Center; Baton Rouge, Louisiana
February 14; 8:00 p.m., ESPNU		Mississippi State	W 69–67 ^{OT}	15–10 (5–6)	Maravich Assembly Center; Baton Rouge, Louisiana
February 18; 12:30 p.m., SECN		at South Carolina	W 68–58	16–10 (6–6)	Colonial Life Arena; Columbia, South Carolina
February 22; 7:00 p.m., SECN		Georgia	W 61–53	17–10 (7–6)	Maravich Assembly Center; Baton Rouge, Louisiana
February 25; 12:00 p.m., SECN		at Ole Miss	L 48–72	17–11 (7–7)	Tad Smith Coliseum; Oxford, Mississippi
February 29; 8:00 p.m., CSS		Tennessee	L 69–74 ^{OT}	17–12 (7–8)	Maravich Assembly Center; Baton Rouge, Louisiana
March 3; 1:00 p.m., CBS		at Auburn	L 52–67	17–13 (7–9)	Auburn Arena; Auburn, AL
2012 SEC tournament
March 8; 12:00 p.m., SECN	No. (8)	vs. (9) Arkansas; First Round	W 70–54	18–13	New Orleans Arena; New Orleans
March 9; 12:00 p.m., SECN	No. (8)	vs. No. 1 (1) Kentucky; Quarterfinals	L 51–60	18–14	New Orleans Arena; New Orleans
2012 NIT
March 13*; 8:30 p.m., ESPN	No. (6)	at (3) Oregon; First Round	L 74–96	18–15	Matthew Knight Arena; Eugene, Oregon
*Non-conference game. ^{#}Rankings from AP Poll. (#) Tournament seedings in parentheses. All times are in Central Time Zone.
