= List of Nevada Wolf Pack men's basketball head coaches =

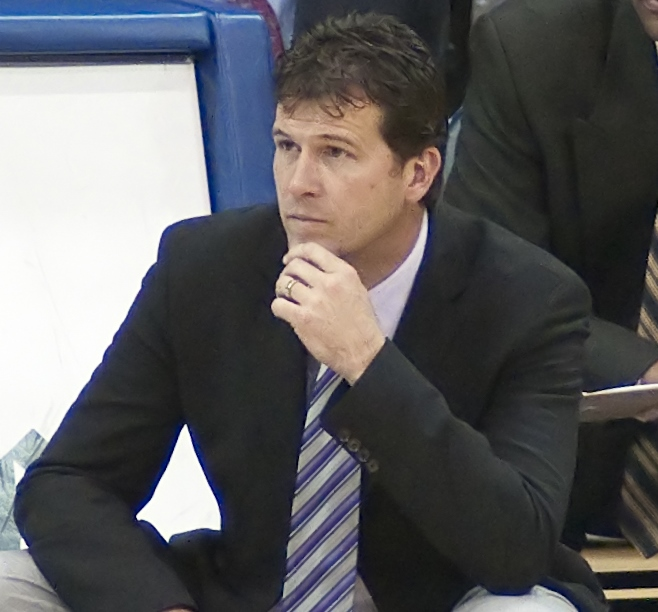
Steve Alford, the current head coach of the Nevada Wolf Pack.

The following is a list of Nevada Wolf Pack men's basketball head coaches. There have been 19 head coaches of the Wolf Pack in their 110-season history.

Nevada's current head coach is Steve Alford. He was hired as the Wolf Pack's head coach in April 2019, replacing Eric Musselman, who left to become the head coach at Arkansas.

No.	Tenure	Coach	Years	Record	Pct.
1	1912–1913	C. E. Holoway	1	3–1	.750
2	1913–1919	Silas Ross	6	33–21	.611
3	1919–1923	Ray Courtright	4	25–29	.463
4	1923–1929; 1930–1939	Doc Martie	15	129–122	.514
5	1929–1930	Chester Scranton	1	6–13	.316
6	1939–1942	Charles Schuhardt	3	12–28	.300
7	1942–1943; 1945–1959	Jake Lawlor	15	204–156	.567
8	1944–1945	Jim Aiken	1	8–9	.471
9	1959–1972	Jack Spencer	13	123–99	.554
10	1972–1976	Jim Padgett	4	43–61	.413
11	1976–1980	Jim Carey	4	65–46	.586
12	1980–1987	Sonny Allen	7	114–89	.562
13	1987–1993	Len Stevens	6	91–79	.535
14	1993–1999	Pat Foster	6	90–81	.526
15	1999–2004	Trent Johnson	5	79–74	.516
16	2004–2009	Mark Fox	5	123–43	.741
17	2009–2015	David Carter	6	98–97	.503
18	2015–2019	Eric Musselman	4	110–34	.764
19	2019–present	Steve Alford	4	70–51	.579
Totals		19 coaches	110 seasons	1,426–1,233	.536
Records updated through end of 2022–23 season Source
