= 2011–12 Nevada Wolf Pack men's basketball team =

American college basketball season

2011–12 Nevada Wolf Pack men's basketball

WAC Regular Season Champions

NIT, Quarterfinals
- Conference: Western Athletic Conference
- Record: 28–7 (13–1 WAC)
- Head coach: David Carter (3rd season)
- Assistant coaches: Doug Novsek; Keith Brown; Zac Claus
- Home arena: Lawlor Events Center

2011–12 WAC men's basketball standings
	Conf.				Overall
Team	W		L	PCT	W		L	PCT
Nevada	13	–	1	.929	28	–	7	.800
New Mexico State†	10	–	4	.714	26	–	10	.722
Idaho	9	–	5	.643	19	–	14	.576
Utah State	8	–	6	.571	21	–	16	.568
Louisiana Tech	6	–	8	.429	18	–	16	.529
Hawaii	6	–	8	.429	16	–	16	.500
Fresno State	3	–	11	.214	13	–	20	.394
San Jose State	1	–	13	.071	9	–	22	.290
† 2012 WAC tournament winner Rankings from AP poll

The 2011–12 Nevada Wolf Pack men's basketball team represented the University of Nevada, Reno during the 2011–12 NCAA Division I men's basketball season. The Wolf Pack, led by third year head coach David Carter, played their home games at the Lawlor Events Center and were members of the Western Athletic Conference. They finished the season 28–7, 13–1 in WAC play to be crowned regular season. They lost to Louisiana Tech in the semifinals of the WAC Basketball tournament. As regular season conference champions, they received an automatic bid into the 2012 National Invitation Tournament where they defeated Oral Roberts in the first round and Bucknell in the second round before falling in the quarterfinals to Stanford.

This was Nevada's final year as a member of the WAC as they will join the Mountain West Conference in July 2012.

== Roster ==
Number	Name	Position	Height	Weight	Year	Hometown
1	Patrick Nyeko	Guard	6–6	180	Junior	London, England
2	Jerry Evans, Jr.	Guard	6–8	188	Sophomore	Lawndale, California
4	Devonte Elliott	Forward	6–10	220	Sophomore	Los Angeles, California
11	Brice Crook	Guard	6–4	205	Sophomore	Reno, Nevada
12	Keith Fuetsch	Guard	6–0	170	Junior	Reno, Nevada
15	Jordan Finn	Guard	6–4	190	Sophomore	Rancho Cucamonga, California
20	Jordan Burris	Guard	6–7	205	Sophomore	Bakersfield, California
24	Deonte Burton	Guard	6–1	185	Sophomore	Los Angeles, California
31	Olek Czyz	Forward	6–7	240	Senior	Gdynia, Poland
33	Kevin Panzer	Forward	6–9	205	Sophomore	Mission Viejo, California
34	Milik Story	Guard	6–5	225	Junior	Pasadena, California
44	Dario Hunt	Forward	6–8	235	Senior	Colorado Springs, Colorado
45	Richard Bell	Forward	6–9	215	Freshman	West Sussex, England

== Schedule ==
Date time, TV	Rank^{#}	Opponent^{#}	Result	Record	Site (attendance) city, state
Exhibition
11/08/2011*; 7:00 pm		Chico State	W 77–60		Lawlor Events Center (3,192); Reno, Nevada
Regular season
11/11/2011*; 7:00 pm, KY3		Missouri State	W 68–46	0–1	Lawlor Events Center (4,285); Reno, Nevada
11/14/2011*; 7:00 pm, CBSSN		at UNLV	L 67–71	0–2	Thomas & Mack Center (14,827); Paradise, Nevada
11/17/2011*; 7:00 pm		Pacific	W 78–54	1–2	Lawlor Events Center (4,016); Reno, Nevada
11/20/2011*; 3:00 pm		Prairie View A&M; Chicago Invitational Challenge	W 60–47	2–2	Lawlor Events Center (2,451); Reno, Nevada
11/22/2011*; 7:00 pm		Longwood; Chicago Invitational Challenge	W 80–78	3–2	Lawlor Events Center (2,656); Reno, Nevada
11/22/2011*; 3:00 pm, BYUtv		vs. BYU; Chicago Invitational Challenge	L 55–76	3–3	Sears Centre (NA); Hoffman Estates, Illinois
11/26/2011*; 2:30 pm		vs. Bradley; Chicago Invitational Challenge	W 64–59	4–3	Sears Centre (NA); Hoffman Estates, Illinois
12/02/2011*; 8:00 pm, ESPNU		Washington	W 76–73 ^{OT}	5–3	Lawlor Events Center (4,722); Reno, Nevada
12/07/2011*; 5:30 pm, FSAZ		at Arizona State	W 69–61	6–3	Wells Fargo Arena (4,639); Tempe, Arizona
12/10/2011*; 6:00 pm		at Montana	W 70–64	7–3	Dahlberg Arena (2,946); Missoula, Montana
12/17/2011*; 3:00 pm		UC Riverside	W 71–47	8–3	Lawlor Events Center (4,063); Reno, Nevada
12/22/2011*; 7:00 pm		Portland	W 78–60	9–3	Lawlor Events Center (3,651); Reno, Nevada
12/28/2011*; 7:00 pm		Cedarville	W 71–61	10–3	Lawlor Events Center (3,376); Reno, Nevada
01/05/2012; 8:00 pm		at Idaho	W 73–55	11–3 (1–0)	Cowan Spectrum (1,081); Moscow, Idaho
01/07/2012; 6:00 pm, WSN		at Utah State	W 78–71	12–3 (2–0)	Smith Spectrum (10,270); Logan, Utah
01/12/2012; 7:00 pm		San Jose State	W 81–57	13–3 (3–0)	Lawlor Events Center (4,730); Reno, Nevada
01/14/2012; 7:00 pm		Hawaiʻi	W 77–74	14–3 (4–0)	Lawlor Events Center (5,452); Reno, Nevada
01/17/2012*; 7:00 pm		Nebraska–Omaha	W 81–69	15–3	Lawlor Events Center (3,407); Reno, Nevada
01/21/2012; 7:00 pm, WSN		Fresno State	W 74–61	16–3 (5–0)	Lawlor Events Center (7,016); Reno, Nevada
01/26/2012; 6:00 pm, WSN		at New Mexico State	W 68–60	17–3 (6–0)	Pan American Center (6,192); Las Cruces, New Mexico
01/28/2012; 5:00 pm		at Louisiana Tech	W 65–63	18–3 (7–0)	Thomas Assembly Center (3,050); Ruston, Louisiana
02/02/2012; 7:00 pm		Utah State	W 53–52	19–3 (8–0)	Lawlor Events Center (9,988); Reno, Nevada
02/04/2012; 7:00 pm		Idaho	L 68–72	19–4 (8–1)	Lawlor Events Center (7,349); Reno, Nevada
02/09/2012; 9:00 pm, KAME-TV		at Hawaiʻi	W 88–79	20–4 (9–1)	Stan Sheriff Center (6,893); Honolulu, Hawaii
02/11/2012; 8:00 pm		at San Jose State	W 76–70	21–4 (10–1)	Event Center Arena (2,063); San Jose, California
02/14/2012*; 7:00 pm		Cal State Bakersfield	W 61–47	22–4	Lawlor Events Center (4,214); Reno, Nevada
02/18/2012*; 1:00 pm, ESPN2		at Iona; ESPN BracketBusters	L 84–90	22–5	Hynes Athletic Center (2,611); New Rochelle, New York
02/25/2012; 7:00 pm, WSN		at Fresno State	W 79–76 ^{3OT}	23–5 (11–1)	Save Mart Center (6,966); Fresno, California
03/01/2012; 8:00 pm, ESPN2		New Mexico State	W 65–61	24–5 (12–1)	Lawlor Events Center (8,074); Reno, Nevada
03/03/2012; 7:00 pm		Louisiana Tech	W 79–69	25–5 (13–1)	Lawlor Events Center (7,894); Reno, Nevada
2012 WAC men's basketball tournament
03/08/2012; 6:00 pm		vs. San Jose State; Quarterfinals	W 54–44	26–5	Orleans Arena (1,823); Las Vegas, Nevada
03/09/2012; 8:30 pm, WSN		vs. Louisiana Tech; Semifinals	L 73–78	26–6	Orleans Arena (2,352); Las Vegas, Nevada
2012 NIT
03/14/2012*; 6:15 pm, ESPN3		at Oral Roberts; First Round	W 68–59	27–6	Mabee Center (2,474); Tulsa, Oklahoma
03/18/2012*; 12:00 pm, ESPNU		Bucknell; Second Round	W 75–67	28–6	Lawlor Events Center (6,927); Reno, Nevada
03/21/2012*; 6:00 pm, ESPN2		at Stanford; Quarterfinals	L 56–84	28–7	Maples Pavilion (3,020); Stanford, California
*Non-conference game. ^{#}Rankings from AP Poll. (#) Tournament seedings in parentheses. All times are in Pacific Time.
