= 2019–20 San Diego Toreros men's basketball team =

American college basketball season

2019–20 San Diego Toreros men's basketball
- Conference: West Coast Conference
- Record: 9–23 (2–14 WCC)
- Head coach: Sam Scholl (2nd season)
- Assistant coaches: David Carter; Terrence Rencher; Jerry Brown
- Home arena: Jenny Craig Pavilion

2019–20 West Coast Conference men's basketball standings
	Conf.				Overall
Team	W		L	PCT	W		L	PCT
No. 2 Gonzaga †	15	–	1	.938	31	–	2	.939
No. 14 BYU	13	–	3	.813	24	–	8	.750
Saint Mary's	11	–	5	.688	26	–	8	.765
Pacific	11	–	5	.688	23	–	10	.697
San Francisco	9	–	7	.563	22	–	12	.647
Pepperdine	8	–	8	.500	16	–	16	.500
Santa Clara	6	–	10	.375	20	–	13	.606
Loyola Marymount	4	–	12	.250	11	–	21	.344
San Diego	2	–	14	.125	9	–	23	.281
Portland	1	–	15	.063	9	–	23	.281
† 2020 WCC tournament winner Rankings from AP poll

The 2019–20 San Diego Toreros men's basketball team represented the University of San Diego during the 2019–20 NCAA Division I men's basketball season. The Toreros were led by second-year head coach Sam Scholl and played their home games at the Jenny Craig Pavilion in San Diego, California as members of the West Coast Conference (WCC). They finished the season 9–23, 2–14 in WCC play, to finish in ninth place. They lost in the first round of the WCC tournament to Loyola Marymount.

== Previous season ==
The Toreros finished the 2018–19 season 21–15, 7–9 in WCC play, to finish in seventh place. They defeated Portland, Santa Clara and BYU to advance to the semifinals of the WCC tournament where they lost to Saint Mary's. The Toreros received an at-large bid to the NIT where they lost to Memphis in the first round.

== Offseason ==
=== Departures ===
Name	Number	Pos.	Height	Weight	Year	Hometown	Reason for departure
Isaiah Piñeiro	0	F	6' 7"	215	RS Senior	Auburn, CA	Graduated
Tyler Williams	1	G	6' 5"	190	Senior	Plano, TX	Graduated
Olin Carter III	3	G	6' 2"	190	Senior	Allen, TX	Graduated
Mitch Schafer	4	G	5' 10"	170	Senior	Portland, OR	Walk-on; graduated
Andy Nelson	10	G	6' 1"	180	Junior	Lafayette, CO	Walk-on; left the team for personal reasons
Akim-Jamal Jonah	11	C	6' 11"	245	RS Freshman	Berlin, Germany	Turned pro
José Martinez	13	F	6' 10"	200	Junior	Cayey, Puerto Rico	Left the team for personal reasons
Andrew Ferguson	14	C	7' 0"	230	RS Freshman	Perth, Australia	Transferred
Isaiah Wright	22	G	6' 2"	180	RS Senior	Boise, ID	Graduated
Jake Gilliam	32	C	6' 10"	255	Sophomore	San Diego, CA	Walk-on; left the team for personal reasons

=== Incoming transfers ===
Name	Number	Pos.	Height	Weight	Year	Hometown	Previous school
Jared Rodriguez	20	F	6' 8"	180	Sophomore	Glendale, AZ	Transferred from Idaho. Under NCAA transfer rules, Rodiguez would have sat out the 2019–20 season, but was granted a waiver to play immediately.
James Jean-Marie	23	F	6' 7"	215	Junior	Montreal, QC	Junior college transferred from Navarro College
Vladimir Pinchuk	40	F/C	6' 11"	235	Junior	Hagen, Germany	Transferred from New Mexico. Under NCAA transfer rules, Pinchuk sat out the 2019–20 season. Will have two years of remaining eligibility.

=== 2019 recruiting class ===
College recruiting information
Name	Hometown	School	Height	Weight	Commit date
Mikal Gjerde; SF	Oslo, Norway	Woodstock Academy	6 ft 6 in (1.98 m)	N/A	Sep 25, 2018
Mikal Gjerde; SF	Recruit ratings: Scout: Rivals: (0)				
Marion Humphrey; SG	Birmingham, AL	TaylorMade Academy	6 ft 2 in (1.88 m)	N/A	
Marion Humphrey; SG	Recruit ratings: Scout: Rivals: (0)				
Noel Coleman; PG	Leopoldsburg, Belgium	Sunrise Christian Academy	6 ft 1 in (1.85 m)	165 lb (75 kg)	
Noel Coleman; PG	Recruit ratings: Scout: Rivals: (0)				
Sabry Philip; SG	Edmonton, AB	TRC Academy	6 ft 4 in (1.93 m)	N/A	Apr 3, 2018
Sabry Philip; SG	Recruit ratings: Scout: Rivals: (0)				
Overall recruit ranking: Scout: nr Rivals: nr ESPN: nr
Note: In many cases, Scout, Rivals, 247Sports, On3, and ESPN may conflict in their listings of height and weight.; In these cases, the average was taken. ESPN grades are on a 100-point scale.; Sources: "San Diego Toreros 2019 Basketball Commitments". Rivals.; "2019 San Diego Toreros Basketball Commits". Scout.; "ESPN 2019 San Diego Toreros Basketball recruits". ESPN.; "Scout.com Team Recruiting Rankings". Scout.; "2019 Team Ranking". Rivals.

== Roster ==
2019–20 San Diego Toreros men's basketball team
Players
Coaches

Pos.	#	Name	Height	Weight	Year	Previous school	Hometown
G	0	Marion Humphrey	6 ft 2 in (1.88 m)	185 lb (84 kg)	RS Fr	Hoover	Hoover, AL
G	1	Braun Hartfield	6 ft 6 in (1.98 m)	185 lb (84 kg)	RS Jr	Garfield Heights; Youngstown State	Cleveland, OH
G	2	Joey Calcaterra	6 ft 3 in (1.91 m)	165 lb (75 kg)	RS So	Marin Catholic	Novato, CA
G	3	Noel Coleman	6 ft 1 in (1.85 m)	175 lb (79 kg)	RS Fr	Sunrise Christian Academy	Leopoldsburg, Belgium
G	4	Sabry Pilip	6 ft 4 in (1.93 m)	190 lb (86 kg)	RS Fr	TRC Academy	Edmonton, AB
G	5	Finn Sullivan	6 ft 4 in (1.93 m)	175 lb (79 kg)	So	Torrey Pines	San Diego, CA
F	10	Mikal Gjerde	6 ft 7 in (2.01 m)	200 lb (91 kg)	Fr	Woodstock Academy	Haugesund, Norway
G	14	Felipe Doria (W)	6 ft 5 in (1.96 m)	180 lb (82 kg)	Fr	IMG Academy	São Paulo, Brazil
F	15	Alex Floresca	6 ft 8 in (2.03 m)	240 lb (109 kg)	RS Sr	Webster Groves	Webster Groves, MO
F	20	Jared Rodriguez	6 ft 7 in (2.01 m)	205 lb (93 kg)	RS So	Mountain Ridge; Idaho	Glendale, AZ
F	23	James Jean-Marie	6 ft 7 in (2.01 m)	225 lb (102 kg)	Jr	Athlos Academy; Navarro College	Montreal, QC
F	25	Yauhen Massalski	6 ft 10 in (2.08 m)	245 lb (111 kg)	Jr	Gymnasium No. 15	Minsk, Belarus
G	31	Reggie Parris	6 ft 3 in (1.91 m)	185 lb (84 kg)	RS Fr	Mullen	Lakewood, CO
C	40	Vladimir Pinchuk (redshirt)	6 ft 11 in (2.11 m)	230 lb (104 kg)	Jr	Phoenix Hagen; New Mexico	Hagen, Germany

Head coach

- Sam Scholl (San Diego)

Assistant coach(es)

- David Carter (Saint Mary's)
- Terrence Rencher (Texas)
- Jerry Brown (Fresno State)

Legend

- (C) Team captain
- (S) Suspended
- (I) Ineligible
- (W) Walk-on
- Injured
- Current redshirt

Roster
Last update: May 29, 2025

== Schedule and results ==
Date time, TV	Rank^{#}	Opponent^{#}	Result	Record	High points	High rebounds	High assists	Site (attendance) city, state
Non-conference regular season
November 5, 2019*; 7:00 p.m.		UC Irvine	L 73–76	0–1	17 – Hartfield	8 – Hartfield	4 – Floresca	Jenny Craig Pavilion (1,517); San Diego, CA
November 9, 2019*; 3:30 p.m.		at Long Beach State	L 62–74	0–2	20 – Calcaterra	12 – Jean-Marie	3 – Humphrey	Walter Pyramid (3,548); Long Beach, CA
November 12, 2019*; 7:00 p.m.		Fresno State	W 72–66 ^{OT}	1–2	21 – Calcaterra	11 – Jean-Marie	4 – Floresca	Jenny Craig Pavilion (1,145); San Diego, CA
November 14, 2019*; 6:00 p.m.		at Weber State	W 71–56	2–2	21 – Calcaterra	9 – Jean-Marie	5 – Floresca	Dee Events Center (5,586); Ogden, UT
November 16, 2019*; 7:00 p.m., P12N		at No. 25 Colorado	L 53–71	2–3	10 – tied	8 – Jean-Marie	3 – tied	CU Events Center (7,714); Boulder, CO
November 20, 2019*; 8:00 p.m., FSW		San Diego State; City Championship	L 49–66	2–4	10 – tied	10 – Jean-Marie	3 – Floresca	Jenny Craig Pavilion (4,524); San Diego, CA
November 24, 2019*; 7:30 p.m., P12N		at No. 25 Washington	L 69–88	2–5	13 – Humphrey	5 – Jean-Marie	5 – Jean-Marie	Alaska Airlines Arena (8,537); Seattle, WA
November 27, 2019*; 7:00 p.m.		Hofstra; Boca Raton Classic non-bracket game	W 79–69	3–5	25 – Hartfield	12 – Hartfield	5 – Calcaterra	Jenny Craig Pavilion (907); San Diego, CA
December 1, 2019*; 6:00 p.m.		vs. St. Bonaventure; Boca Raton Classic Hall of Fame semifinals	L 60–71	3–6	18 – Hartfield	6 – Jean–Marie	4 – Calcaterra	FAU Arena; Boca Raton, FL
December 2, 2019*; 2:00 p.m.		vs. UIC; Boca Raton Classic Hall of Fame third-place game	L 83–89	3–7	22 – Rodriguez	10 – Hartfield	5 – Humphrey	FAU Arena; Boca Raton, FL
December 7, 2019*; 7:00 p.m.		Holy Cross; Boca Raton Classic non-bracket game	W 68–51	4–7	12 – Massalski	8 – Massalski	5 – Coleman	Jenny Craig Pavilion (1,025); San Diego, CA
December 11, 2019*; 7:00 p.m.		at Cal State Fullerton	W 66–54	5–7	18 – Hartfield	10 – Floresca	4 – Humphrey	Titan Gym (723); Fullerton, CA
December 14, 2019*; 7:00 p.m., Stadium		UC Davis	W 58–54	6–7	11 – tied	12 – Humphery	4 – Hartfield	Jenny Craig Pavilion (1,199); San Diego, CA
December 21, 2019*; 12:00 p.m., P12N		vs. Stanford; Al Attles Classic	L 59–62	6–8	17 – Calcaterra	9 – tied	4 – Hartfield	Chase Center (3,586); San Francisco, CA
December 29, 2019*; 2:00 p.m.		Whittier College	W 93–67	7–8	20 – Hartfield	10 – Massalski	7 – Humphrey	Jenny Craig Pavilion (1,149); San Diego, CA
WCC regular season
January 2, 2020; 7:00 p.m.		at Loyola Marymount	L 58–64	7–9 (0–1)	14 – Calcaterra	6 – tied	5 – Humphrey	Gersten Pavilion (770); Los Angeles, CA
January 4, 2020; 2:00 p.m.		at Santa Clara	L 63–80	7–10 (0–2)	14 – tied	6 – Jean-Marie	3 – tied	Leavey Center (1,361); Santa Clara, CA
January 9, 2020; 7:00 p.m.		No. 1 Gonzaga	L 50–94	7–11 (0–3)	9 – tied	7 – Hartfield	2 – tied	Jenny Craig Pavilion (4,549); San Diego, CA
January 11, 2020; 7:00 p.m.		Pepperdine	L 78–85	7–12 (0–4)	25 – Sullivan	8 – Rodriguez	5 – Sullivan	Jenny Craig Pavilion (1,490); San Diego, CA
January 16, 2020; 6:00 p.m., BYUtv		at BYU	L 70–93	7–13 (0–5)	21 – Hartfield	6 – Massalski	3 – Jean-Marie	Marriott Center (11,339); Provo, UT
January 18, 2020; 7:00 p.m.		at Portland	W 77–67	8–13 (1–5)	17 – Rodriguez	14 – Massalski	5 – Hartfield	Chiles Center (1,689); Portland, OR
January 25, 2020; 3:00 p.m.		Santa Clara	L 52–65	8–14 (1–6)	14 – Jean-Marie	10 – Massalski	2 – Humphrey	Jenny Craig Pavilion (2,038); San Diego, CA
January 30, 2020; 7:00 p.m.		San Francisco	L 44–69	8–15 (1–7)	11 – Hartfield	8 – Hartfield	3 – Humphrey	Jenny Craig Pavilion (1,642); San Diego, CA
February 1, 2020; 7:00 p.m.		at Pacific	L 58–66	8–16 (1–8)	27 – Hartfield	7 – Hartfield	2 – Floresca	Alex G. Spanos Center; Stockton, CA
February 6, 2020; 8:00 p.m., ESPNU		Saint Mary's	L 60–66	8–17 (1–9)	18 – Hartfield	9 – Massalski	3 – Hartfield	Jenny Craig Pavilion (1,713); San Diego, CA
February 8, 2020; 7:00 p.m.		Portland	W 88–81 ^{2OT}	9–17 (2–9)	23 – Hartfield	12 – Massalski	8 – Humphrey	Jenny Craig Pavilion (1,153); San Diego, CA
February 13, 2020; 8:00 p.m., SPECSN		at Pepperdine	L 69–72	9–18 (2–10)	26 – Hartfield	6 – Massalski	4 – tied	Firestone Fieldhouse (1,275); Malibu, CA
February 15, 2020; 7:00 p.m., CBSSN		BYU	L 71–72	9–19 (2–11)	16 – Sullivan	6 – Sullivan	5 – Sullivan	Jenny Craig Pavilion (2,711); San Diego, CA
February 22, 2020; 5:00 p.m., Stadium		at Saint Mary's	L 63–92	9–20 (2–12)	15 – Hartfield	8 – Massalski	2 – 2 tied	University Credit Union Pavilion (3,500); Moraga, CA
February 27, 2020; 6:00 p.m.		at No. 3 Gonzaga	L 59–94	9–21 (2–13)	19 – Calcaterra	6 – Floresca	2 – 3 tied	McCarthey Athletic Center (6,000); Spokane, WA
February 29, 2020; 7:00 p.m.		Pacific	L 64–71	9–22 (2–14)	17 – Hartfield	5 – Humphrey	2 – tied	Jenny Craig Pavilion (1,419); San Diego, CA
WCC tournament
March 5, 2020; 6:00 p.m., BYUtv	(9)	vs. (8) Loyola Marymount; First round	L 61–75	9–23	15 – tied	9 – Humphrey	3 – Hartfield	Orleans Arena (1,983); Paradise, NV
*Non-conference game. ^{#}Rankings from AP poll. (#) Tournament seedings in parentheses. All times are in Pacific.
