= Deonte Burton =

Deonte Burton may refer to:

- Deonte Burton (basketball, born 1991)
- Deonte Burton (basketball, born 1994)
