= 2011–12 Utah State Aggies men's basketball team =

American college basketball season

2011–12 Utah State Aggies men's basketball
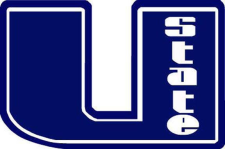

CIT, Runner Up
- Conference: Western Athletic Conference
- Record: 21–16 (8–6 WAC)
- Head coach: Stew Morrill
- Assistant coaches: Tim Duryea; Chris Jones; Tarvish Felton
- Home arena: Smith Spectrum

2011–12 WAC men's basketball standings
	Conf.				Overall
Team	W		L	PCT	W		L	PCT
Nevada	13	–	1	.929	28	–	7	.800
New Mexico State†	10	–	4	.714	26	–	10	.722
Idaho	9	–	5	.643	19	–	14	.576
Utah State	8	–	6	.571	21	–	16	.568
Louisiana Tech	6	–	8	.429	18	–	16	.529
Hawaii	6	–	8	.429	16	–	16	.500
Fresno State	3	–	11	.214	13	–	20	.394
San Jose State	1	–	13	.071	9	–	22	.290
† 2012 WAC tournament winner Rankings from AP poll

The 2011–12 Utah State Aggies men's basketball team represented Utah State University in the 2011–12 college basketball season. This was head coach Stew Morrill's fourteenth season at Utah State. The Aggies played their home games at the Smith Spectrum and are members of the Western Athletic Conference. They finished the season 21–16, 8–6 in WAC play to finish in fourth place. They lost in the quarterfinals of the WAC Basketball tournament to Louisiana Tech. They were invited to the 2012 CollegeInsider.com Tournament where they defeated Cal State Bakersfield, Idaho, Loyola Marymount and Oakland to advance to the championship game where they fell to Mercer.

== Roster ==
2011–12 Utah State Aggies men's basketball team
Players
Coaches

Pos.	#	Name	Height	Weight	Year	Previous school	Hometown
G	0	Brockeith Payne	6 ft 1 in (1.85 m)	195 lb (88 kg)	Sr	Dallas Carter; Midland College	Dallas, TX
F	1	Ben Clifford	6 ft 7 in (2.01 m)	215 lb (98 kg)	RS Fr	Bingham	South Jordan, UT
G	3	Sam Orchard	6 ft 6 in (1.98 m)	175 lb (79 kg)	Fr	Highland	Salt Lake City, UT
G	5	Steve Thornton	6 ft 3 in (1.91 m)	175 lb (79 kg)	Fr	Golden Valley; Stoneridge Prep	Valencia, CA
G/F	11	Adam Thoseby	6 ft 4 in (1.93 m)	190 lb (86 kg)	Fr	under 18 Reading Rockets; Maine Central Institute	Henley-on-Thames, England
G/F	12	Danny Berger	6 ft 6 in (1.98 m)	175 lb (79 kg)	So	North Medford; Chemeketa Community College	Medford, OR
G	13	Preston Medlin	6 ft 4 in (1.93 m)	175 lb (79 kg)	RS So	Hebron	Carrollton, TX
G	14	E.J. Farris	6 ft 2 in (1.88 m)	185 lb (84 kg)	Jr	Newark Memorial; College of the Sequoias	Newark, CA
F	15	Mitch Brunell	6 ft 5 in (1.96 m)	205 lb (93 kg)	So	Eagle; College of Southern Idaho	Eagle, ID
F	21	Morgan Grim	6 ft 7 in (2.01 m)	230 lb (104 kg)	Sr	Riverton; Utah	Riverton, UT
F	22	Brady Jardine (injured)	6 ft 7 in (2.01 m)	220 lb (100 kg)	Sr	Twin Falls	Twin Falls, ID
G	24	Antonio Bumpus	6 ft 3 in (1.91 m)	185 lb (84 kg)	RS Jr	Eastmoor Academy; Harcum College	Columbus, OH
C	25	Jordan Stone	6 ft 10 in (2.08 m)	270 lb (122 kg)	Fr	Sky View	Smithfield, UT
F	30	David Collette	6 ft 8 in (2.03 m)	220 lb (100 kg)	Fr	Murray	Murray, UT
G	34	Kyisean Reed	6 ft 6 in (1.98 m)	215 lb (98 kg)	Jr	Highland; Antelope Valley College	Palmdale, CA
F	40	Igor Premasunac	6 ft 8 in (2.03 m)	240 lb (109 kg)	Jr	School of Economics; Lon Morris College	Zagreb, Croatia
F/C	44	Jarred Shaw	6 ft 10 in (2.08 m)	235 lb (107 kg)	Jr	Dallas Carter; Oklahoma State	Dallas, TX

Head coach

- Stew Morrill (Ricks College;
  Gonzaga)

Assistant coach(es)

- Tim Duryea (North Texas)
- Chris Jones (Utah)
- Tarvish Felton (Southern Utah University)

Legend

- (C) Team captain
- (S) Suspended
- (I) Ineligible
- (W) Walk-on
- Injured
- Current redshirt

== Schedule ==
Date time, TV	Rank^{#}	Opponent^{#}	Result	Record	Site (attendance) city, state
Exhibition
10/28/11*; 7:00 pm		UC San Diego	W 74–42	NA	Smith Spectrum (9,519); Logan, UT
11/05/11*; 4:00 pm		Adams State	W 73–63	NA	Smith Spectrum (7,331); Logan, UT
Regular season
11/11/11*; 7:00 pm, KCSG/ESPN3		BYU	W 69–62	1–0	Smith Spectrum (10,270); Logan, UT
11/15/11*; 7:00 pm		at Weber State	L 63–73	1–1	Dee Events Center (9,359); Ogden, UT
11/19/11*; 7:00 pm, KCSG/ESPN3		Southern Utah	W 65–62	2–1	Smith Spectrum (10,068); Logan, UT
11/22/11*; 6:00 pm		at Texas A&M-Corpus Christi	L 55–58 ^{OT}	2–2	American Bank Center (1,382); Corpus Christi, TX
11/26/11*; 7:00 pm, KCSG/ESPN3		at Idaho State	W 75–62	3–2	Holt Arena (2,545); Pocatello, ID
11/30/11*; 7:00 pm, KCSG/ESPN3		Denver	L 54–67	3–3	Smith Spectrum (10,056); Logan, UT
12/03/11*; 8:00 pm		at Pacific	L 57–65	3–4	Alex G. Spanos Center (2,316); Stockton, CA
12/06/11*; 7:00 pm, KCSG/ESPN3		Utah Valley	W 63–54	4–4	Smith Spectrum (10,141); Logan, UT
12/10/11*; 6:00 pm		at Wichita State	L 76–83	4–5	Charles Koch Arena (10,386); Wichita, KS
12/17/11*; 7:00 pm, KMYU/ESPN3		Seattle	W 78–53	5–5	Smith Spectrum (9,337); Logan, UT
12/20/11*; 8:00 pm		UT-Arlington; Athletes in Action Basketball Classic	W 73–69	6–5	Smith Spectrum (9,666); Logan, UT
12/21/11*; 8:00 pm		Saint Peter's; Athletes in Action Basketball Classic	W 72–47	7–5	Smith Spectrum (9,959); Logan, UT
12/22/11*; 8:00 pm		Kent State; Athletes in Action Basketball Classic	W 81–62	8–5	Smith Spectrum (10,059); Logan, UT
12/31/11*; 12:00 pm		at No. 15 Mississippi State	L 64–66	8–6	Humphrey Coliseum (7,385); Starkville, MS
01/05/12; 7:00 pm, WAC Sports Network/ESPN3		Fresno State	W 72–53	9–6 (1–0)	Smith Spectrum (9,010); Logan, UT
01/07/12; 7:00 pm, WAC Sports Network/ESPN3		Nevada	L 71–78	9–7 (1–1)	Smith Spectrum (10,270); Logan, UT
01/12/12; 7:00 pm, KMYU/ESPN3		at New Mexico State	L 60–80	9–8 (1–2)	Pan American Center (5,214); Las Cruces, NM
01/14/12; 7:00 pm		at Louisiana Tech	W 69–65	10–8 (2–2)	Thomas Assembly Center (4,099); Ruston, LA
01/19/12*; 8:00 pm		at Seattle	L 66–73	10–9	KeyArena (2,510); Seattle, WA
01/21/12; 8:00 pm		at Idaho	L 54–57	10–10 (2–3)	Cowan Spectrum (2,359); Moscow, ID
01/26/12; 7:00 pm, ESPN+/Altitude		Hawaiʻi	W 77–72	11–10 (3–3)	Smith Spectrum (9,870); Logan, UT
01/28/12; 7:00 pm, KMYU/ESPN3		San Jose State	W 82–65	12–10 (4–3)	Smith Spectrum (10,270); Logan, UT
02/02/12; 8:00 pm		at Nevada	L 52–53	12–11 (4–4)	Lawlor Events Center (9,988); Reno, NV
02/04/12; 8:00 pm		at Fresno State	L 54–60	12–12 (4–5)	Save Mart Center (7,590); Fresno, CA
02/09/12; 7:00 pm, ESPN+/Altitude		Louisiana Tech	W 77–63	13–12 (5–5)	Smith Spectrum (9,643); Logan, UT
02/11/12; 1:00 pm, ESPN2		New Mexico State	L 69–80	13–13 (5–6)	Smith Spectrum (10,067); Logan, UT
02/14/12*; 7:00 pm		Montana Tech	W 70–58	14–13	Smith Spectrum (9,657); Logan, UT
02/18/12*; 7:00 pm, KMYU/ESPN3		UC Santa Barbara; ESPNU BracketBusters	L 64–72	14–14	Smith Spectrum (10,048); Logan, UT
02/24/12; 7:00 pm, KMYU/ESPN3		Idaho	W 67–50	15–14 (6–6)	Smith Spectrum (10,178); Logan, UT
03/01/12; 8:00 pm		at San Jose State	W 71–61	16–14 (7–6)	The Event Center Arena (1,563); San Jose, CA
03/03/12; 10:00 pm, OC Sports		at Hawaiʻi	W 61–60	17–14 (8–6)	Stan Sheriff Center (8,192); Honolulu, HI
WAC tournament
03/08/12; 9:30 pm		vs. Louisiana Tech; Quarterfinals	L 70–72	17–15	Orleans Arena (1,823); Las Vegas, NV
2012 CollegeInsider.com Postseason Tournament
03/14/12*; 8:00 pm		Cal State Bakersfield; First Round	W 75–69	18–15	Smith Spectrum (2,141); Logan, UT
03/17/12*; 7:00 pm		Idaho; Second Round	W 76–56	19–15	Smith Spectrum (2,430); Logan, UT
03/21/12*; 7:00 pm		Loyola Marymount; Quarterfinals	W 77–69	20–15	Smith Spectrum (3,546); Logan, UT
03/25/12*; 4:00 pm		Oakland; Semifinals	W 105–81	21–15	Smith Spectrum (2,092); Logan, UT
03/28/12*; 7:00 pm, FCS Central		Mercer; Championship Game	L 67–70	21–16	Smith Spectrum (6,154); Logan, UT
*Non-conference game. ^{#}Rankings from AP Poll. (#) Tournament seedings in parentheses. All times are in Mountain Time.
