= 2011–12 Louisiana Tech Bulldogs basketball team =

American college basketball season

2011–12 Louisiana Tech Bulldogs men's basketball
- Conference: Western Athletic Conference
- Record: 18–16 (6–8 WAC)
- Head coach: Michael White (1st season)
- Assistant coaches: Isaac Brown; Dusty May; Derrick Jones
- Home arena: Thomas Assembly Center

2011–12 WAC men's basketball standings
	Conf.				Overall
Team	W		L	PCT	W		L	PCT
Nevada	13	–	1	.929	28	–	7	.800
New Mexico State†	10	–	4	.714	26	–	10	.722
Idaho	9	–	5	.643	19	–	14	.576
Utah State	8	–	6	.571	21	–	16	.568
Louisiana Tech	6	–	8	.429	18	–	16	.529
Hawaii	6	–	8	.429	16	–	16	.500
Fresno State	3	–	11	.214	13	–	20	.394
San Jose State	1	–	13	.071	9	–	22	.290
† 2012 WAC tournament winner Rankings from AP poll

The 2011–12 Louisiana Tech Bulldogs basketball team represented Louisiana Tech University during the 2011–12 NCAA Division I men's basketball season. The Bulldogs, led by first year head coach Michael White, played their home games at the Thomas Assembly Center and were members of the Western Athletic Conference.

== Previous season ==
The Bulldogs were only able to win 12 games, finishing last in the Western Athletic Conference.

== Offseason ==
Louisiana Tech decided to fire head coach Kerry Rupp after four seasons, buying out the final year of his deal. Michael White, an assistant coach from Ole Miss, was hired as the new head coach.

=== Departures ===
Name	Number	Pos.	Height	Weight	Year	Hometown	Reason for Departure
DeAndre Brown	11	G	5'11"	185	Senior	Fort Worth, TX	Graduated
Olu Ashaolu	5	F	6'7"	228	Redshirt junior	Toronto, Canada	Transferred to Oregon
Tevin Hall	14	G	5'10"	157	Sophomore	Bossier City, LA	Transferred to Midwestern State
Justin Rake	30	G	6'3"	210	Sophomore	Chicago, IL	Transferred to University of Minnesota Crookston

=== Incoming transfers ===
Name	Num	Pos.	Height	Weight	Year	Hometown	Previous school
Trevor Gaskins	5	G	6'2"	215	Redshirt Senior	Alpharetta, GA	Ole Miss
Isaiah Massey	10	F	6'8"	220	Redshirt Freshman	McDonough, GA	Ole Miss
Chris Johnson	3	G/F	6'5"	205	Junior	North Preston, Nova Scotia	

== Roster ==
2011–12 Louisiana Tech Bulldogs men's basketball team
Players
Coaches

Pos.	#	Name	Height	Weight	Year	Hometown
F	1	Michale Kyser	6 ft 9 in (2.06 m)	210 lb (95 kg)	Fr	Lancaster, TX
G	2	Brandon Gibson	6 ft 5 in (1.96 m)	225 lb (102 kg)	RS Jr	Marianna, FL
G	3	Raheem Appleby	6 ft 2 in (1.88 m)	160 lb (73 kg)	Fr	Jacksonville, AR
G	4	Speedy Smith	6 ft 3 in (1.91 m)	185 lb (84 kg)	Fr	St. Petersburg, FL
G	5	Trevor Gaskins	6 ft 2 in (1.88 m)	215 lb (98 kg)	RS Sr	Alpharetta, GA
F	10	Isaiah Massey	6 ft 8 in (2.03 m)	220 lb (100 kg)	RS Fr	McDonough, GA
F	11	Stojan Gjuroski	6 ft 7 in (2.01 m)	195 lb (88 kg)	RS Fr	Gostivar, Macedonia
G	15	Cordarius Johnson	6 ft 5 in (1.96 m)	215 lb (98 kg)	So	Coushatta, LA
G	20	Lonnie Smith	6 ft 5 in (1.96 m)	185 lb (84 kg)	So	Birmingham, AL
G	21	Kenyon McNeail	6 ft 1 in (1.85 m)	185 lb (84 kg)	So	Conway, AR
G	24	Alex Carr	6 ft 2 in (1.88 m)	190 lb (86 kg)	Fr	Adamsville, AL
F/C	25	J.L. Lewis	6 ft 8 in (2.03 m)	240 lb (109 kg)	Jr	Gonzales, LA
F	33	Robby Price (W)	6 ft 8 in (2.03 m)	230 lb (104 kg)	Fr	Anacoco, LA
F/C	45	Romario Souza	6 ft 10 in (2.08 m)	245 lb (111 kg)	Sr	Minas Gerais, Brazil

Head coach

- Michael White (Mississippi)

Assistant coach(es)

- Isaac Brown (Louisiana–Monroe)
- Dusty May (Indiana)
- Derrick Jones (Samford)

Legend

- (C) Team captain
- (S) Suspended
- (I) Ineligible
- (W) Walk-on
- Injured
- Current redshirt

Roster
Last update: 2013-02-08

== Schedule ==
Date time, TV	Rank^{#}	Opponent^{#}	Result	Record	Site (attendance) city, state
Exhibition
November 6, 2011*; 3:00 pm		Texas A&M–Kingsville	W 72–71	—	Thomas Assembly Center; Ruston, LA
Regular season
November 13, 2011*; 3:00 pm		Mississippi College	W 92–70	1–0	Thomas Assembly Center (2,056); Ruston, LA
November 19, 2011*; 7:00 pm		at Texas–Arlington	L 61–68	1–1	Texas Hall (955); Arlington, TX
November 25, 2011*; 5:30 pm		vs. Maryland Eastern Shore; Jim Thorpe Classic	W 73–54	2–1	Arena-Auditorium (1,125); Laramie, WY
November 26, 2011*; 5:30 pm		vs. Portland State; Jim Thorpe Classic	L 48–68	2–2	Arena-Auditorium (496); Laramie, WY
November 27, 2011*; 8:00 pm		at Wyoming; Jim Thorpe Classic	L 58–73	2–3	Arena-Auditorium (4,083); Laramie, WY
November 30, 2011*; 7:00 pm		at Southeastern Louisiana	L 69–72 ^{OT}	2–4	University Center (1,065); Hammond, LA
December 3, 2011*; 7:30 pm		at Louisiana–Monroe	W 73–71	3–4	Fant–Ewing Coliseum (2,013); Monroe, LA
December 6, 2011*; 7:00 pm		Northwestern State	W 94–93 ^{2OT}	4–4	Thomas Assembly Center (2,429); Ruston, LA
December 10, 2011*; 7:00 pm		at Southern Miss	L 62–78	4–5	Reed Green Coliseum (2,714); Hattiesburg, MS
December 14, 2011*; 7:00 pm		McNeese State	W 60–58	5–5	Thomas Assembly Center (2,426); Ruston, LA
December 17, 2011*; 7:00 pm		Arkansas–Little Rock	W 71–68	6–5	Thomas Assembly Center (2,321); Ruston, LA
December 20, 2011*; 7:00 pm		Northeastern	W 56–53	7–5	Thomas Assembly Center (2,183); Ruston, LA
December 22, 2011*; 7:00 pm		at Arkansas	L 63–77	7–6	Bud Walton Arena (11,414); Fayetteville, AR
December 29, 2011*; 5:00 pm		Spring Hill	W 69–41	8–6	Thomas Assembly Center (4,930); Ruston, LA
December 31, 2011*; 1:00 pm		at SMU	L 65–73	8–7	Moody Coliseum (1,596); University Park, TX
January 7, 2012; 7:00 pm		New Mexico State	L 73–83	8–8 (0–1)	Thomas Assembly Center (2,263); Ruston, LA
January 12, 2012; 6:00 pm, ALT2/BHSN/CST		Idaho	L 88–90 ^{OT}	8–9 (0–2)	Thomas Assembly Center (4,472); Ruston, LA
January 14, 2012; 8:00 pm		Utah State	L 65–69	8–10 (0–3)	Thomas Assembly Center (4,099); Ruston, LA
January 19, 2012; 11:00 pm, OC16		at Hawaii	W 74–70	9–10 (1–3)	Stan Sheriff Center (6,016); Honolulu, HI
January 21, 2012; 8:00 pm		at San Jose State	W 71–67	10–10 (2–3)	Event Center Arena (1,497); San Jose, CA
January 26, 2012; 6:00 pm, CSNC/ESPNFC/WSN		Fresno State	W 59–58	11–10 (3–3)	Thomas Assembly Center (3,282); Ruston, LA
January 28, 2012; 7:00 pm		Nevada	L 63–65	11–11 (3–4)	Thomas Assembly Center (3,050); Ruston, LA
February 4, 2012; 8:00 pm, AggieVision/ESPNFC/WSN		at New Mexico State	L 72–83	11–12 (3–5)	Pan American Center (5,010); Las Cruces, NM
February 9, 2012; 8:05 pm, ALT/CST/ESPNFC/MASN		at Utah State	L 63–77	11–13 (3–6)	Smith Spectrum (9,643); Logan, UT
February 11, 2012; 10:05 pm		at Idaho	L 64–73	11–14 (3–7)	Cowan Spectrum (1,843); Moscow, ID
February 16, 2012*; 8:00 pm		North Dakota	W 58–53	12–14	Thomas Assembly Center (4,071); Ruston, LA
February 18, 2012*; 3:30 pm		Central Arkansas; BracketBusters	W 84–62	13–14	Thomas Assembly Center (3,977); Ruston, LA
February 23, 2012; 7:00 pm		San Jose State	W 75–49	14–14 (4–7)	Thomas Assembly Center (1,760); Ruston, LA
February 25, 2012; 3:00 pm, ALT2/CST/ESPNFC		Hawaii	W 84–67	15–14 (5–7)	Thomas Assembly Center (4,158); Ruston, LA
March 1, 2012; 10:00 pm		at Fresno State	W 75–70	16–14 (6–7)	Save Mart Center (10,012); Fresno, CA
March 3, 2012; 9:00 pm		at Nevada	L 69–79	16–15 (6–8)	Lawlor Events Center (7,894); Reno, NV
WAC tournament
March 8, 2012; 10:30 pm	(5)	vs. (4) Utah State; Quarterfinals	W 72–70	17–15	Orleans Arena (1,823); Las Vegas, NV
March 9, 2012; 10:30 pm, CSNC/ESPNFC/WSN	(5)	vs. (1) Nevada; Semifinals	W 78–73	18–15	Orleans Arena (2,352); Las Vegas, NV
March 10, 2012; 11:00 pm, ESPN2	(5)	vs. (2) New Mexico State; Championship Game	L 57–82	18–16	Orleans Arena (1,405); Las Vegas, NV
*Non-conference game. ^{#}Rankings from AP Poll. (#) Tournament seedings in parentheses. All times are in Central Time.
