= 2011–12 New Mexico State Aggies men's basketball team =

American college basketball season

2011–12 New Mexico State Aggies men's basketball

WAC tournament champions

NCAA Tournament, Round of 64
- Conference: Western Athletic Conference
- Record: 26–10 (10–4 WAC)
- Head coach: Marvin Menzies (5th season)
- Assistant coaches: Paul Weir; Keith Brown; Tony Delk
- Home arena: Pan American Center

2011–12 WAC men's basketball standings
	Conf.				Overall
Team	W		L	PCT	W		L	PCT
Nevada	13	–	1	.929	28	–	7	.800
New Mexico State†	10	–	4	.714	26	–	10	.722
Idaho	9	–	5	.643	19	–	14	.576
Utah State	8	–	6	.571	21	–	16	.568
Louisiana Tech	6	–	8	.429	18	–	16	.529
Hawaii	6	–	8	.429	16	–	16	.500
Fresno State	3	–	11	.214	13	–	20	.394
San Jose State	1	–	13	.071	9	–	22	.290
† 2012 WAC tournament winner Rankings from AP poll

The 2011–12 New Mexico State Aggies men's basketball team represented New Mexico State University during the 2011–12 NCAA Division I men's basketball season. The Aggies, led by fifth year head coach Marvin Menzies, played their home games at Pan American Center and are members of the Western Athletic Conference. They finished the season 26–10, 10–4 in WAC play to finish in second place. They were champions of WAC Basketball tournament to earn the conference's automatic bid into the 2012 NCAA tournament where they lost in the second round to Indiana.

== Previous season ==
The Aggies finished the season 16-17, 9-7 in WAC play to finish tied for third place.

== Departures ==
Name	Number	Pos.	Height	Weight	Year	Hometown	Notes
Drew Herig	5	G	6'0"	183	Freshman	Albuquerque, NM	Transferred to Lamar CC
Makhtar Diop	21	G	6'6"	195	Junior	Dakar, Senegal	Left the program
Troy Gillenwater	33	F	6'8"	238	Junior	Boston, MA	Left to turn professional
Gordo Castillo	34	G	6'5"	190	Senior	Las Cruces, NM	Graduated
Abdoulaye N'doye	55	C	7'0"	215	Sophomore	Dakar, Senegal	Left the program

== Incoming transfers ==
Name	Number	Pos.	Height	Weight	Year	Hometown	Previous School
K.C. Ross-Miller		G	6'0"	180	Sophomore	Grand Prairie, Texas	Transfer from New Orleans. Will need to sit out a year to be eligible

== 2011 Recruiting Class ==
College recruiting information
Name	Hometown	School	Height	Weight	Commit date
Remi Barry; F	Paris, France	Del Oro HS	6 ft 7 in (2.01 m)	210 lb (95 kg)	Aug 18, 2010
Remi Barry; F	Recruit ratings: Scout: 247Sports: (85)				
D.J. Lewis; G	New Orleans, LA	New Horizon Prep	6 ft 0 in (1.83 m)	170 lb (77 kg)	
D.J. Lewis; G	Recruit ratings: No ratings found				
Terrel de Rouen; G	Las Cruces, NM	Onate HS	6 ft 1 in (1.85 m)	165 lb (75 kg)	
Terrel de Rouen; G	Recruit ratings: No ratings found				
Daniel Mullings; G	Toronto, ON	Sir Wilfrid Laurier	6 ft 2 in (1.88 m)	170 lb (77 kg)	
Daniel Mullings; G	Recruit ratings: No ratings found				
Eric Weary; G	New Orleans, LA	Warren Easton Charter	6 ft 5 in (1.96 m)	210 lb (95 kg)	
Eric Weary; G	Recruit ratings: No ratings found				
Emery Coleman; G	Tularosa, NM	Tularosa HS	6 ft 3 in (1.91 m)	180 lb (82 kg)	Apr 26, 2011
Emery Coleman; G	Recruit ratings: No ratings found				
Temjae Singleton; G	Woodland Hills, CA	Camino Real HS	6 ft 5 in (1.96 m)	210 lb (95 kg)	Apr 30, 2011
Temjae Singleton; G	Recruit ratings: No ratings found				
Overall recruit ranking:
Note: In many cases, Scout, Rivals, 247Sports, On3, and ESPN may conflict in their listings of height and weight.; In these cases, the average was taken. ESPN grades are on a 100-point scale.; Sources: "2011 New Mexico State Basketball Commits". ESPN.

== Roster ==
2011–12 New Mexico State Aggies men's basketball team
Players
Coaches

Pos.	#	Name	Height	Weight	Year	Previous school	Hometown
F	1	Christian Kabongo	6 ft 4 in (1.93 m)	199 lb (90 kg)	So	Central Commerce Collegiate	Toronto, ON
F	3	Remi Barry	6 ft 7 in (2.01 m)	210 lb (95 kg)	Fr	Del Oro High School	Paris, France
G	5	D.J. Lewis	6 ft 0 in (1.83 m)	170 lb (77 kg)	Fr	New Horizon Prep	New Orleans, LA
F	10	Bandja Sy	6 ft 8 in (2.03 m)	214 lb (97 kg)	Jr	Stoneridge Prep	Cergy, France
G	13	Hernst Laroche	6 ft 1 in (1.85 m)	170 lb (77 kg)	Sr	Vanier College	Montreal, Quebec
G	14	Terrel de Rouen	6 ft 1 in (1.85 m)	165 lb (75 kg)	Fr	Onate High School	Las Cruces, NM
C	15	Tshilidzi Nephawe	6 ft 10 in (2.08 m)	268 lb (122 kg)	So	Stoneridge Prep	Johannesburg, South Africa
G	23	Daniel Mullings	6 ft 2 in (1.88 m)	170 lb (77 kg)	Fr	Sir Wilfrid Laurier Collegiate Institute	Toronto, ON
G	25	Renaldo Dixon	6 ft 10 in (2.08 m)	210 lb (95 kg)	So	Christian Faith Academy	Toronto, ON
F	31	Wendell McKines	6 ft 6 in (1.98 m)	230 lb (104 kg)	Sr	Richmond HS	Oakland, CA
C	32	Hamidu Rahman	6 ft 11 in (2.11 m)	245 lb (111 kg)	Sr	American Christian School	Somerset, NJ
F	45	Tyrone Watson	6 ft 5 in (1.96 m)	225 lb (102 kg)	Jr	Cathedral High School	Hamilton, Ontario
G		K.C. Ross-Miller (I)	6 ft 0 in (1.83 m)	180 lb (82 kg)	So	New Orleans; God's Academy	Grand Prairie, Texas
F		B.J. West (redshirt)	6 ft 11 in (2.11 m)	240 lb (109 kg)	Jr	God's Academy	Cheneyville, LA
G		Eric Weary (redshirt)	6 ft 5 in (1.96 m)	210 lb (95 kg)	Fr	Warren Easton Charter	New Orleans, LA
G		Emery Coleman (redshirt)	6 ft 3 in (1.91 m)	180 lb (82 kg)	Fr	Tularosa High School	Tularosa, NM
G		Temjae Singleton (redshirt)	6 ft 5 in (1.96 m)	210 lb (95 kg)	Fr	El Camino Real HS	Woodland Hills, CA

Head coach

- Marvin Menzies (UCLA)

Assistant coach(es)

- Paul Weir (York)
- Keith Brown (Pacific)
- Tony Delk (Kentucky)

Legend

- (C) Team captain
- (S) Suspended
- (I) Ineligible
- (W) Walk-on
- Injured
- Current redshirt

Roster

== Schedule ==
Date time, TV	Rank^{#}	Opponent^{#}	Result	Record	High points	High rebounds	High assists	Site (attendance) city, state
Exhibition
11/02/2011*; 7:00 pm		Eastern New Mexico	W 115–64		19 – McKines	9 – McKines	7 – Kabongo	Pan American Center (5,742); Las Cruces, NM
Regular season
11/12/2011*; 7:00 pm		at Northern Colorado	W 89–75	1–0	20 – Kabongo	10 – McKines	5 – Laroche	Butler–Hancock Sports Pavilion (2,259); Greeley, CO
11/16/2011*; 8:00 pm, The Mtn.		at New Mexico; Rio Grande Rivalry	W 62–53	2–0	14 – McKines	9 – McKines	6 – Laroche	The Pit (15,303); Albuquerque, NM
11/19/2011*; 6:00 pm, ALT2/ESPN3		UTEP; The Battle of I-10	W 89–73	3–0	23 – McKines	13 – McKines	6 – Kabongo	Pan American Center (6,967); Las Cruces, NM
11/24/2011*; 8:30 pm, FCS Pacific		vs. Central Michigan; Great Alaska Shootout First Round	W 78–49	4–0	15 – Sy	12 – McKines	4 – Laroche	Sullivan Arena (4,271); Anchorage, AK
11/25/2011*; 10:00 pm, FCS Pacific		vs. Southern Miss; Great Alaska Shootout Semifinals	L 49–62	4–1	19 – Kabongo	5 – McKines/Rahman	5 – Kabongo/Laroche	Sullivan Arena (4,744); Anchorage, AK
11/26/2011*; 7:30 pm, FCS Pacific		vs. San Francisco; Great Alaska Shootout 3rd Place Game	W 71–60	5–1	23 – Kabongo	8 – McKines	7 – Laroche	Sullivan Arena (4,327); Anchorage, AK
11/29/2011*; 7:00 pm, KVIA 7.3/ALT2/ESPN3		Arizona	L 76–83	5–2	28 – McKines	10 – McKines	3 – Kabongo/Mullings	Pan American Center (7,966); Las Cruces, NM
12/04/2011*; 12:00 pm		at Southern Miss	L 66–74	5–3	21 – Kabongo	6 – Kabongo	3 – Kabongo	Reed Green Coliseum (2,606); Hattiesburg, MS
12/11/2011*; 3:00 pm		at UTEP; The Battle of I-10	L 69–73	5–4	16 – Laroche	11 – McKines	7 – Kabongo	Don Haskins Center (7,839); El Paso, TX
12/14/2011*; 7:00 pm, KVIA 7.3/ALT2/ESPN3		Western New Mexico	W 92–65	6–4	18 – McKines/Laroche	13 – Rahman	3 – Laroche/Watson	Pan American Center (4,671); Las Cruces, NM
12/19/2011*; 5:00 pm, KVIA 7.3/ESPN3		Southern	W 91–66	7–4	20 – McKines	16 – McKines	5 – Watson	Pan American Center (4,544); Las Cruces, NM
12/21/2011*; 7:00 pm		McNeese State	W 82–62	8–4	23 – McKines	17 – McKines	6 – Laroche	Pan American Center (4,844); Las Cruces, NM
12/28/2011*; 7:00 pm, KVIA 7.3/ALT2/ESPN3		New Mexico; Rio Grande Rivalry	L 69–89	8–5	25 – McKines	15 – McKines	2 – 3 Tied	Pan American Center (8,361); Las Cruces, NM
12/31/2011*; 12:00 pm		Arkansas–Pine Bluff	W 81–65	9–5	22 – McKines	14 – McKines	4 – McKines/Laroche	Pan American Center (4,409); Las Cruces, NM
01/02/2012*; 8:00 pm		at Cal State Bakersfield	W 73–72	10–5	21 – Mullings	7 – McKines	6 – Watson	Icardo Center (1,262); Bakersfield, CA
01/07/2012; 6:00 pm		at Louisiana Tech	W 83–73	11–5 (1–0)	25 – McKines	14 – McKines	4 – McKines	Thomas Assembly Center (2,263); Ruston, LA
01/12/2012; 7:00 pm, KVIA 7.3/ALT2/ESPN3		Utah State	W 80–60	12–5 (2–0)	17 – Mullings	11 – McKines	6 – Laroche	Pan American Center (5,214); Las Cruces, NM
01/14/2012; 7:00 pm, KVIA 7.2/ALT2/ESPN3		Idaho	W 80–68	13–5 (3–0)	23 – McKines	10 – McKines	5 – Watson	Pan American Center (5,306); Las Cruces, NM
01/19/2012; 8:30 pm		at San Jose State	W 79–63	14–5 (4–0)	24 – McKines	8 – McKines/Rahman	4 – Watson/Laroche	Event Center Arena (1,186); San Jose, CA
01/21/2012; 10:00 pm, KVIA 7.3/OC Sports		at Hawaii	L 87–91	14–6 (4–1)	17 – Sy	10 – Sy	5 – Watson	Stan Sheriff Center (7,346); Honolulu, HI
01/26/2012; 7:00 pm, KVIA 7.3/ALT2/WSN/ESPN3		Nevada	L 60–68	14–7 (4–2)	21 – Laroche	8 – McKines	3 – Laroche	Pan American Center (6,192); Las Cruces, NM
01/28/2012; 7:30 pm, KVIA 7.2/WSN/ESPN3		Fresno State	W 60–56	15–7 (5–2)	20 – McKines	10 – McKines	6 – Watson	Pan American Center (5,331); Las Cruces, NM
02/01/2012*; 6:30 pm, KVIA 7.3/ESPN3		Cal State Bakersfield	W 78–57	16–7	20 – McKines	14 – McKines	4 – Laroche	Pan American Center (5,049); Las Cruces, NM
02/04/2012; 7:00 pm, KVIA 7.2/ESPN3		Louisiana Tech	W 83–72	17–7 (6–2)	20 – Rahman	10 – McKines	7 – Watson	Pan American Center (5,010); Las Cruces, NM
02/09/2012; 9:00 pm		at Idaho	L 58–59	17–8 (6–3)	12 – McKines/Rahman	9 – McKines	8 – Watson	Cowan Spectrum (1,159); Moscow, ID
02/11/2012; 1:00 pm, ESPN2		at Utah State	W 80–69	18–8 (7–3)	20 – McKines	9 – McKines	7 – Laroche	Smith Spectrum (10,067); Logan, UT
02/14/2012*; 7:00 pm, KVIA 7.3/ESPN3		Northern New Mexico	W 100–68	19–8	19 – Sy	9 – Watson/Dixon	4 – Sy/Laroche	Pan American Center (4,469); Las Cruces, NM
02/18/2012*; 1:00 pm, ESPNU		Drake; ESPN BracketBusters	W 71–55	20–8	25 – McKines	12 – McKines	7 – Watson	Pan American Center (5,119); Las Cruces, NM
02/23/2012; 7:00 pm, KVIA 7.3/ESPN3		Hawaiʻi	W 115–73	21–8 (8–3)	28 – Mullings	12 – Mullings	10 – Mullings	Pan American Center (5,223); Las Cruces, NM
02/25/2012; 7:00 pm, KVIA 7.2/ESPN3		San Jose State	W 79–68	22–8 (9–3)	22 – Rahman	15 – McKines	4 – Mullings	Pan American Center (6,049); Las Cruces, NM
03/01/2012; 9:00 pm, ESPN2		at Nevada	L 61–65	22–9 (9–4)	19 – McKines	13 – McKines	5 – Laroche/Watson	Lawlor Events Center (8,074); Reno, NV
03/03/2012; 8:00 pm		at Fresno State	W 83–78 ^{OT}	23–9 (10–4)	22 – Sy	18 – McKines	5 – Watson	Save Mart Center (6,135); Fresno, CA
WAC Tournament
03/08/2012; 2:30 pm		vs. Fresno State; Quarterfinals	W 65–49	24–9	15 – McKines	13 – McKines	3 – Laroche	Orleans Arena (1,902); Paradise, NV
03/09/2012; 6:00 pm, WSN		vs. Hawaiʻi; Semifinals	W 92–81	25–9	22 – McKines	10 – Mullings	6 – McKines/Laroche	Orleans Arena (2,352); Las Vegas, NV
03/10/2012; 9:00 pm, ESPN2		vs. Louisiana Tech; Championship Game	W 82–57	26–9	27 – McKines	14 – McKines	6 – Laroche	Orleans Arena (1,405); Las Vegas, NV
NCAA Tournament
03/15/2012*; 7:45 pm, CBS	No. (S 13)	vs. No. 16 (S 4) Indiana; Second Round	L 66–79	26–10	15 – McKines	7 – McKines	3 – Mullings	Rose Garden (17,519); Portland, OR
*Non-conference game. ^{#}Rankings from AP Poll. (#) Tournament seedings in parentheses. All times are in Mountain Time (#) during NCAA Tournament is seed with Region.
