= 2012 WAC men's basketball tournament =

- Classification: Division I
- Season: 2011–12
- Teams: 8
- Site: Orleans Arena; Paradise, Nevada, USA
- Champions: New Mexico State (3rd title)
- Winning coach: Marvin Menzies (2nd title)
- MVP: Wendell McKines (New Mexico State)
- Television: ESPN2/WSN

2011–12 WAC men's basketball standings
	Conf.				Overall
Team	W		L	PCT	W		L	PCT
Nevada	13	–	1	.929	28	–	7	.800
New Mexico State†	10	–	4	.714	26	–	10	.722
Idaho	9	–	5	.643	19	–	14	.576
Utah State	8	–	6	.571	21	–	16	.568
Louisiana Tech	6	–	8	.429	18	–	16	.529
Hawaii	6	–	8	.429	16	–	16	.500
Fresno State	3	–	11	.214	13	–	20	.394
San Jose State	1	–	13	.071	9	–	22	.290
† 2012 WAC tournament winner Rankings from AP poll

The 2012 WAC men's basketball tournament, was held March 7–10, 2012 at the Orleans Arena in Paradise, Nevada, United States to crown a champion of the Western Athletic Conference. The winner of the tournament received an automatic bid to the 2012 NCAA tournament. The 2012 Championship game was televised on ESPN2 at 9:00 pm Pacific Time.

== Format ==
With the departure of Boise State to the Mountain West Conference, WAC Commissioner Karl Benson announced during the basketball preseason teleconferences that the league would change its postseason basketball tournament to a regular quarterfinal format, getting rid of the double-bye format used in 2011. This format was to be used for 2012 only; the format was to be re-evaluated for 2013 after new five new teams came in and three schools departed for a total of 10 participating institutions in 2012–13.

== Schedule ==
Session	Game	Time*	Matchup^{#}	Television	Attendance
Quarterfinals – Thursday, March 8
1	1	12:00 PM	#3 Idaho vs. #6 Hawaiʻi	WAC.tv	N/A
1	2	2:30 PM	#2 New Mexico State vs. #7 Fresno State	WAC.tv	1,902
2	3	6:00 PM	#1 Nevada vs. #8 San Jose State	WAC.tv	N/A
2	4	8:30 PM	#4 Utah State vs. #5 Louisiana Tech	WAC.tv	1,823
Semifinals – Friday, March 9
3	5	6:00 PM	#6 Hawaiʻi vs. #2 New Mexico State	WSN	N/A
3	6	8:30 PM	#1 Nevada vs. #5 Louisiana Tech	WSN	2,352
Championship Game – Saturday, March 10
4	7	9:00 PM	#2 New Mexico State vs. #5 Louisiana Tech	ESPN2	1,405
*Game Times in PT. #-Rankings denote tournament seeding.

== Bracket ==
Quarterfinals; Thursday, March 8
3	Idaho	70
6	Hawaiʻi	72
2	New Mexico State	65
7	Fresno State	49
1	Nevada	54
8	San Jose State	44
4	Utah State	70
5	Louisiana Tech	72

Semifinals; Friday, March 9
6	Hawaiʻi	81
2	New Mexico State	92
1	Nevada	73
5	Louisiana Tech	78

Championship Game; Saturday, March 10
2	New Mexico State	82
5	Louisiana Tech	57

== Game summaries ==
WAC.tv

Mar 8
12:00 pm

Recap

Idaho Vandals 70, Hawaiʻi Rainbow Warriors 72
Scoring by half: 28–42, 35–37
Pts: Kyle Barone 19; Rebs: Djim Bandoumel 16; Asts: Landon Tatum 4	Pts: Vander Joaquim 20; Rebs: Vander Joaquim 13; Asts: Jeremiah Ostrowski 9

Orleans Arena
Las Vegas, NV
Attendance: N/A
Referees: David Hall, Mike Giarratano, D.G. Nelson

WAC.tv

Mar 8
2:30 pm

Recap

New Mexico State Aggies 65, Fresno State Bulldogs 49
Scoring by half: 25–40, 30–40
Pts: Wendell McKines 15; Rebs: Wendell McKines 13; Asts: Hernst Laroche 3	Pts: Kevin Foster 14; Rebs: Tyler Johnson 7 Asts: Steven Shepp 3

Orleans Arena
Las Vegas, NV
Attendance: 1,902
Referees: Winston Stith, Doran Gotschall, Jimmy Casas

WAC.tv

Mar 8
6:00 pm

Recap

Nevada Wolf Pack 54, San Jose State Spartans 44
Scoring by half: 13–14, 41–30
Pts: Deonte Burton 16; Rebs: 2 tied with 8 Asts: 2 tied with 3	Pts: Wil Carter 18; Rebs: 2 tied with 7 Asts: Keith Shamburger 5

Orleans Arena
Las Vegas, NV
Attendance: N/A
Referees: Rick Batsell, Bobby Vetkoetter, Duane Allen

WAC.tv

Mar 8
8:30 pm

Recap

Utah State Aggies 70, Louisiana Tech Bulldogs 72
Scoring by half: 32–35, 38–37
Pts: Danny Berger 17; Rebs: Ben Clifford 6 Asts: Preston Medlin 8	Pts: 2 tied with 16; Rebs: 2 tied with 7 Asts: Trevor Gaskins 5

Orleans Arena
Las Vegas, NV
Attendance: 1,823
Referees: Ronnie Hernandez, Ruben Ramos, Martin Cota

WSN

Mar 9
6:00 pm

Recap

New Mexico State Aggies 92, Hawaiʻi Rainbow Warriors 81
Scoring by half: 47–38, 45–43
Pts: Wendell McKines 22; Rebs: Daniel Mullings 10; Asts: 2 tied with 6	Pts: Shaquille Stokes 21; Rebs: Vander Joaquim 5 Asts: Jeremiah Ostrowski 13

Orleans Arena
Las Vegas, NV
Attendance: N/A
Referees: Verne Harris, Bob Staffen, Rick Batsell

WSN

Mar 9
8:30 pm

Recap

Nevada Wolf Pack 73, Louisiana Tech Bulldogs 78
Scoring by half: 39–42, 34–36
Pts: Malik Story 21; Rebs: Dario Hunt 10; Asts: Deonte Burton 5	Pts: Trevor Gaskins 21; Rebs: 2 tied with 5 Asts: Trevor Gaskins 4

Orleans Arena
Las Vegas, NV
Attendance: 2,352
Referees: Randy McCall, Ronnie Hernandez, Doran Gotschall

ESPN2

Mar 10
9:00 pm

Recap

New Mexico State Aggies 82, Louisiana Tech Bulldogs 57
Scoring by half: 38–20, 44–37
Pts: Wendell McKines 27; Rebs: Wendell McKines 14; Asts: Hernst Laroache 6	Pts: Trevor Gaskins 24; Rebs: Brandon Gibson 7 Asts: Kenneth Smith 2

Orleans Arena
Las Vegas, NV
Attendance: 1,405
Referees: Scott Thornley, Mike Littlewood, Bob Staffen
