= 2011–12 Cal State Fullerton Titans men's basketball team =

American college basketball season

2011–12 Cal State Fullerton Titans men's basketball

CIT, First Round
- Conference: Big West Conference
- Record: 21–10 (12–4 Big West)
- Head coach: Bob Burton (9th season)
- Assistant coaches: Andy Newman; Julius Hicks; Scott Waterman
- Home arena: Titan Gym

2011–12 Big West men's basketball standings
	Conf.				Overall
Team	W		L	PCT	W		L	PCT
Long Beach State †	15	–	1	.938	25	–	9	.735
Cal State Fullerton	12	–	4	.750	21	–	10	.677
UC Santa Barbara	12	–	4	.750	20	–	11	.645
Cal Poly	8	–	8	.500	18	–	15	.545
UC Riverside	7	–	9	.438	14	–	17	.452
Pacific	6	–	10	.375	11	–	19	.367
UC Irvine	6	–	10	.375	12	–	20	.375
UC Davis	3	–	13	.188	5	–	26	.161
Cal State Northridge*	3	–	13	.188	7	–	21	.250
† 2012 Big West tournament winner As of March 15, 2012; Rankings from AP Poll; *Ineligible for conference tournament due to low APR

The 2011–12 Cal State Fullerton Titans men's basketball team represented California State University, Fullerton during the 2011–12 NCAA Division I men's basketball season. The Titans, led by ninth year head coach Bob Burton, played their home games at Titan Gym and are members of the Big West Conference. They finished the season 21–10, 12–4 in Big West play to finish in a tie for second place. They lost in the quarterfinals of the Big West tournament to UC Irvine. They were invited to the 2012 CollegeInsider.com Tournament where they lost in the first round to Loyola Marymount.

Following the season, head coach Bob Burton was fired after posting a record of 155–122 in nine seasons.

== Roster ==
Number	Name	Position	Height	Weight	Year	Hometown
0	Andre Hardy	Forward	6–6	230	Senior	San Diego, California
3	Perry Webster	Guard	6–1	195	Senior	Mission Viejo, California
5	Kwame Vaughn	Guard	6–3	195	Junior	Oakland, California
10	Cameron Glover	Guard	6–0	155	Junior	Lake Elsinore, California
11	D.J. Seeley	Guard	6–4	195	Junior	Stockton, California
12	John Underwood	Center	6–9	230	Junior	Phoenix, Arizona
13	Isiah Umipig	Guard	6–1	180	Sophomore	Federal Way, Washington
14	Orlando Brown	Guard	6–2	175	Senior	Stringtown, Oklahoma
15	Orane Chin	Forward	6–7	195	Senior	Miramar, Florida
21	Omondi Amoke	Forward	6–7	225	Senior	Santa Barbara, California
22	Conway James	Guard	5–6	150	Freshman	Riverside, California
23	Alex Harris	Guard	6–1	170	Sophomore	Richmond, California
24	Bernard Webb	Center	6–9	255	Junior	Bridgeport, Connecticut
32	Chris Collins	Guard	6–4	185	Freshman	Chino, California
33	Sedric Martin	Center	6–6	255	Senior	Austin, Texas
42	Sammy Yeager	Forward	6–4	190	Senior	Modesto, California
44	Jordan Knox	Guard	6–0	180	Junior	Brentwood, California

== Schedule ==
Date time, TV	Rank^{#}	Opponent^{#}	Result	Record	Site (attendance) city, state
Exhibition
11/04/2011*; 7:00 pm		Cal State Los Angeles	W 71–56		Titan Gym; Fullerton, CA
Regular season
11/11/2011*; 7:00 pm		Redlands	W 118–68	1–0	Titan Gym (862); Fullerton, CA
11/18/2011*; 5:00 pm		vs. Nicholls State; Louisiana Tournament	W 73–63	2–0	Cajundome (NA); Lafayette, LA
11/19/2011*; 7:30 pm		at Louisiana-Lafayette; Louisiana Tournament	W 69–63	3–0	Cajundome (3,670); Lafayette, LA
11/20/2011*; 1:00 pm		vs. Houston Baptist; Louisiana Tournament	L 83–88	3–1	Cajundome (NA); Lafayette, LA
11/26/2011*; 6:00 pm		Cal State Bakersfield	L 66–73	3–2	Titan Gym (634); Fullerton, CA
12/01/2011*; 5:00 pm		at Wichita State	L 60–75	3–3	Charles Koch Arena (10,269); Wichita, KS
12/03/2011*; 2:00 pm		at SIU Edwardsville	W 79–57	4–3	Vadalabene Center (1,145); Edwardsville, IL
12/07/2011*; 7:00 pm		at Utah	W 81–50	5–3	Jon M. Huntsman Center (7,671); Salt Lake City, UT
12/11/2011*; 3:00 pm		Eastern Washington	W 91–76	6–3	Titan Gym (751); Fullerton, CA
12/17/2011*; 6:00 pm		La Verne	W 86–44	7–3	Titan Gym (764); Fullerton, CA
12/22/2011*; 7:00 pm		Portland State	W 92–86	8–3	Titan Gym (721); Fullerton, CA
12/29/2011; 7:00 pm		UC Davis	W 65–64	9–3 (1–0)	Titan Gym (759); Fullerton, CA
01/02/2012; 7:00 pm		Pacific	W 78–73	10–3 (2–0)	Titan Gym (671); Fullerton, CA
01/05/2012*; 7:00 pm		at UC Santa Barbara	L 64–77	10–4 (2–1)	The Thunderdome (2,674); Santa Barbara, CA
01/07/2012; 7:00 pm		at Cal Poly	L 67–73	10–5 (2–2)	Mott Gym (2,725); San Luis Obispo, CA
01/14/2012*; 7:00 pm		at Cal State Bakersfield	L 65–67	10–6	Icardo Center (1,234); Bakersfield, CA
01/18/2012; 7:00 pm		UC Riverside	W 72–61	11–6 (3–2)	Titan Gym (896); Fullerton, CA
01/21/2012; 7:00 pm		at UC Irvine	W 92–84	12–6 (4–2)	Bren Events Center (1,521); Irvine, CA
01/26/2012; 7:00 pm		at Cal State Northridge	W 70–68	13–6 (5–2)	Matadome (1,467); Northridge, CA
01/28/2012; 8:00 pm, ESPNU		at Long Beach State	L 61–75	13–7 (5–3)	Walter Pyramid (5,649); Long Beach, CA
02/02/2012; 7:00 pm		Cal Poly	W 83–61	14–7 (6–3)	Titan Gym (932); Fullerton, CA
02/04/2012; 6:00 pm, ESPNU		UC Santa Barbara	W 99–86	15–7 (7–3)	Titan Gym (3,224); Fullerton, CA
02/09/2012; 7:00 pm		UC Irvine	W 100–94	16–7 (8–3)	Titan Gym (923); Fullerton, CA
02/15/2012; 7:00 pm		at UC Riverside	W 77–64	17–7 (9–3)	UC Riverside Student Recreation Center (758); Riverside, CA
02/18/2012*; 6:00 pm		Montana State; ESPN BracketBusters	W 80–66	18–7	Titan Gym (963); Fullerton, CA
02/23/2012; 8:00 pm		at Pacific	W 69–68	19–7 (10–3)	Alex G. Spanos Center (2,019); Stockton, CA
02/25/2012; 7:00 pm		at UC Davis	L 75–78	19–8 (10–4)	The Pavilion (2,404); Davis, CA
02/29/2012; 7:00 pm		Cal State Northridge	W 87–76	20–8 (11–4)	Titan Gym (1,380); Fullerton, CA
03/03/2012; 6:00 pm, FS West		Long Beach State	W 77–74	21–8 (12–4)	Titan Gym (3,458); Fullerton, CA
2012 Big West Conference men's basketball tournament
03/08/2012; 2:30 pm		vs. UC Irvine; Quarterfinals	L 59–65	21–9	Honda Center (NA); Anaheim, CA
2012 CIT
03/14/2012*; 7:00 pm		at Loyola Marymount; First Round	L 79–88	21–10	Gersten Pavilion (1,161); Los Angeles, CA
*Non-conference game. ^{#}Rankings from AP Poll. (#) Tournament seedings in parentheses. All times are in Pacific Time.
