= 2011–12 UC Santa Barbara Gauchos men's basketball team =

American college basketball season

2011–12 UC Santa Barbara Gauchos men's basketball

CIT, First Round
- Conference: Big West Conference
- Record: 20–11 (12–4 Big West)
- Head coach: Bob Williams (14th season)
- Assistant coaches: Matt Stock; Kevin Bromley; Ryan Madry
- Home arena: The Thunderdome

2011–12 Big West men's basketball standings
| | Conf. | | | | Overall |
| Team | W | | L | PCT | W | | L | PCT |
|---|---|---|---|---|---|---|---|---|
| Long Beach State † | 15 | – | 1 | .938 | 25 | – | 9 | .735 |
| Cal State Fullerton | 12 | – | 4 | .750 | 21 | – | 10 | .677 |
| UC Santa Barbara | 12 | – | 4 | .750 | 20 | – | 11 | .645 |
| Cal Poly | 8 | – | 8 | .500 | 18 | – | 15 | .545 |
| UC Riverside | 7 | – | 9 | .438 | 14 | – | 17 | .452 |
| Pacific | 6 | – | 10 | .375 | 11 | – | 19 | .367 |
| UC Irvine | 6 | – | 10 | .375 | 12 | – | 20 | .375 |
| UC Davis | 3 | – | 13 | .188 | 5 | – | 26 | .161 |
| Cal State Northridge* | 3 | – | 13 | .188 | 7 | – | 21 | .250 |
† 2012 Big West tournament winner As of March 15, 2012; Rankings from AP Poll; *Ineligible for conference tournament due to low APR

The 2011–12 UC Santa Barbara Gauchos men's basketball team represented the University of California, Santa Barbara during the 2011–12 NCAA Division I men's basketball season. The Gauchos, led by 14th year head coach Bob Williams, played their home games at the UC Santa Barbara Events Center, nicknamed The Thunderdome, and are members of the Big West Conference. They finished the season 20–11, 12–4 in Big West play to finish in a tie for second place. They lost in the championship game of the Big West Basketball tournament to Long Beach State. They were invited to the 2012 CollegeInsider.com Tournament where they lost in the first round to Idaho.

== Roster ==
| # | Name | Height | Weight (lbs.) | Position | Class | Hometown |
|---|---|---|---|---|---|---|
| 0 | Jaimé Serna | 6'9" | 235 | Forward | Senior | Laguna Beach, California |
| 1 | Nate Garth | 6'2" | 180 | Guard | Junior | Sacramento, California |
| 5 | Keegan Hornbuckle | 6'7" | 205 | Forward | Sophomore | Westlake Village, California |
| 10 | Kyle Boswell | 6'2" | 180 | Guard | Sophomore | Huntington Beach, California |
| 11 | T.J. Taylor | 5'9" | 160 | Guard | Freshman | Oakland, California |
| 12 | Lewis Thomas | 6'7" | 210 | Guard/Forward | Freshman | Perth, Australia |
| 15 | Alan Williams | 6'7" | 240 | Center | Freshman | Phoenix, Arizona |
| 20 | Shawn Moore | 6'5" | 210 | Guard/Forward | Junior | Chico, California |
| 21 | James Nunnally | 6'7" | 205 | Guard | Senior | Stockton, California |
| 24 | Christian Peterson | 6'3" | 219 | Guard | Senior | Carlsbad, California |
| 30 | Tyler Steinhause | 6'1" | 160 | Guard | Sophomore | San Diego, California |
| 32 | John Green | 6'5" | 180 | Guard | Freshman | Oakland, California |
| 33 | Orlando Johnson | 6'5" | 205 | Guard | Senior | Seaside, CA |
| 34 | Prince Arceneux | 6'6" | 190 | Forward | Freshman | Los Angeles, California |
| 35 | Taran Brown | 6'8" | 190 | Forward | Freshman | Gillette, Wyoming |
| 55 | Greg Somogyi | 7'3" | 242 | Center | Senior | Budapest, Hungary |
| | Duke DaRe | 6'1" | 185 | Guard | Freshman | Clayton, California |

== Schedule ==
| Date time, TV | Rank^{#} | Opponent^{#} | Result | Record | Site (attendance) city, state |
Exhibition
| 11/05/2011*; 7:00 pm | | San Francisco State | W 67–51 | | The Thunderdome (2,343); Santa Barbara, CA |
Regular season
| 11/11/2011*; 7:00 pm | | Chapman | W 74–48 | 1–0 | The Thunderdome (2,030); Santa Barbara, CA |
| 11/15/2011*; 7:00 pm | | Santa Clara | W 89–56 | 2–0 | The Thunderdome (2,331); Santa Barbara, CA |
| 11/18/2011*; 7:00 pm | | Westmont | W 82–61 | 3–0 | The Thunderdome (2,619); Santa Barbara, CA |
| 11/22/2011*; 7:00 pm | | Portland | W 83–69 | 4–0 | The Thunderdome (2,447); Santa Barbara, CA |
| 11/26/2011*; 7:00 pm | | San Diego State | L 75–76 | 4–1 | The Thunderdome (5,011); Santa Barbara, CA |
| 11/30/2011*; 7:00 pm | | No. 18 UNLV | L 88–94 ^{2OT} | 4–2 | The Thunderdome (5,516); Santa Barbara, CA |
| 12/13/2011*; 6:00 pm | | at San Diego | W 65–61 | 5–2 | Jenny Craig Pavilion (1,720); San Diego, CA |
| 12/16/2011*; 7:00 pm, ROOTNW | | at Washington | L 80–87 | 5–3 | Alaska Airlines Arena (9,246); Seattle, WA |
| 12/19/2011*; 7:30 pm | | at California | L 50–70 | 5–4 | Haas Pavilion (9,876); Berkeley, CA |
| 12/22/2011*; 7:00 pm, BYUtv | | at BYU | L 75–89 | 5–5 | Marriott Center (10,670); Provo, UT |
| 01/02/2012; 7:00 pm | | at Cal Poly | W 58–57 | 6–5 (1–0) | Mott Gym (3,032); San Luis Obispo, CA |
| 01/05/2012; 7:00 pm | | Cal State Fullerton | W 77–64 | 7–5 (2–0) | The Thunderdome (2,674); Santa Barbara, CA |
| 01/12/2012; 7:00 pm | | at UC Riverside | L 70–79 | 7–6 (2–1) | UC Riverside Student Recreation Center (827); Riverside, CA |
| 01/14/2012; 7:00 pm | | UC Irvine | W 74–56 | 8–6 (3–1) | The Thunderdome (2,607); Santa Barbara, CA |
| 01/19/2012; 7:00 pm | | Cal State Northridge | W 69–61 | 9–6 (4–1) | The Thunderdome (2,182); Santa Barbara, CA |
| 01/21/2012; 8:00 pm, ESPNU | | Long Beach State | L 48–71 | 9–7 (4–2) | The Thunderdome (6,000); Santa Barbara, CA |
| 01/26/2012; 7:00 pm | | at UC Davis | W 86–59 | 10–7 (5–2) | The Pavilion (1,477); Davis, CA |
| 01/28/2012; 5:00 pm | | at Pacific | W 56–53 | 11–7 (6–2) | Alex G. Spanos Center (2,744); Stockton, CA |
| 02/02/2012; 7:00 pm | | at Cal State Northridge | W 85–70 | 12–7 (7–2) | Matadome (1,813); Northridge, CA |
| 02/04/2012; 6:00 pm | | at Cal State Fullerton | L 86–99 | 12–8 (7–3) | Titan Gym (3,224); Fullerton, CA |
| 02/11/2012; 7:30 pm, PrimeTicket | | UC Riverside | W 60–52 | 13–8 (8–3) | The Thunderdome (3,516); Santa Barbara, CA |
| 02/15/2012; 6:00 pm | | at UC Irvine | W 85–62 | 14–8 (9–3) | Bren Events Center (1,372); Irvine, CA |
| 02/18/2012*; 7:00 pm | | at Utah State; ESPN BracketBusters | W 72–64 | 15–8 | Smith Spectrum (10,048); Logan, UT |
| 02/22/2012; 8:00 pm, ESPN2 | | at Long Beach State | L 58–70 | 15–9 (9–4) | Walter Pyramid (4,732); Long Beach, CA |
| 02/25/2012; 8:00 pm, ESPNU | | Cal Poly | W 68–60 | 16–9 (10–4) | The Thunderdome (4,205); Santa Barbara, CA |
| 03/01/2012; 7:00 pm | | Pacific | W 76–61 | 17–9 (11–4) | The Thunderdome (NA); Santa Barbara, CA |
| 03/03/2012; 7:00 pm | | UC Davis | W 90–43 | 18–9 (12–4) | The Thunderdome (3,333); Santa Barbara, CA |
2012 Big West Conference men's basketball tournament
| 03/08/2012; 12:00 pm | | vs. Pacific; Quarterfinals | W 72–52 | 19–9 | Honda Center (NA); Anaheim, CA |
| 03/09/2012; 9:00 pm, ESPNU | | vs. Cal Poly; Semifinals | W 64–52 | 20–9 | Honda Center (5,171); Anaheim, CA |
| 03/10/2012; 7:00 pm, ESPN2 | | vs. Long Beach State; Championship Game | L 64–77 | 20–10 | Honda Center (7,564); Anaheim, CA |
2012 CIT
| 03/14/2012*; 6:00 pm | | at Idaho; First Round | L 83–86 | 20–11 | Cowan Spectrum (1,203); Moscow, ID |
*Non-conference game. ^{#}Rankings from AP Poll. (#) Tournament seedings in parentheses. All times are in Pacific Time.
