= 2011–12 Long Beach State 49ers men's basketball team =

American college basketball season

2011–12 Long Beach State 49ers men's basketball
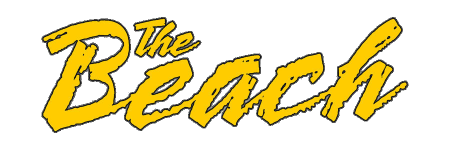

Big West Regular Season Champions Big West tournament champions

NCAA Tournament, First Round
- Conference: Big West Conference
- Record: 25–9 (15–1 Big West)
- Head coach: Dan Monson (5th season)
- Assistant coaches: Vic Couch; Eric Brown; Rod Palmer
- Home arena: Walter Pyramid

2011–12 Big West men's basketball standings
	Conf.				Overall
Team	W		L	PCT	W		L	PCT
Long Beach State †	15	–	1	.938	25	–	9	.735
Cal State Fullerton	12	–	4	.750	21	–	10	.677
UC Santa Barbara	12	–	4	.750	20	–	11	.645
Cal Poly	8	–	8	.500	18	–	15	.545
UC Riverside	7	–	9	.438	14	–	17	.452
Pacific	6	–	10	.375	11	–	19	.367
UC Irvine	6	–	10	.375	12	–	20	.375
UC Davis	3	–	13	.188	5	–	26	.161
Cal State Northridge*	3	–	13	.188	7	–	21	.250
† 2012 Big West tournament winner As of March 15, 2012; Rankings from AP Poll; *Ineligible for conference tournament due to low APR

The 2011–12 Long Beach State 49ers men's basketball team represented California State University, Long Beach during the 2011–12 NCAA Division I men's basketball season. The 49ers, led by fifth year head coach Dan Monson, played their home games at Walter Pyramid and are members of the Big West Conference. They finished the season 25–9, 15–1 in Big West play to be crowned regular season champions. They were also champions of the Big West Basketball tournament to earn the conference's automatic bid into the 2012 NCAA tournament where they lost in the second round to New Mexico. The 49ers were the only Los Angeles-area college basketball team to make the tournament that year.

James Ennis played his freshman season at Oxnard College, a junior college in Oxnard, California, and his sophomore season at Ventura College, a junior college in Ventura, California. In 2011, he signed with Long Beach State, where he became a two-year starter. As a junior, Ennis averaged 10 points and 4.1 rebounds per game and helped lead the 49ers to Big West Conference regular season and conference titles. Ennis was named honorable mention all-conference at the close of the season.

== Roster ==
Number	Name	Position	Height	Weight	Year	Hometown
1	Shaquille Hunter	Guard	6–2	165	Freshman	Villa Park, California
2	Peter Poppageorge	Guard	6–0	175	Junior	Burlingame, California
4	Eugene Phelps	Forward	6–7	225	Senior	Los Angeles, California
5	Mike Caffey	Guard	6–0	170	Freshman	Riverside, California
11	James Ennis	Guard/Forward	6–6	190	Junior	Ventura, California
12	Corey Jackson	Guard	6–0	185	Senior	Brentwood, New York
13	Edis Dervisevic	Forward	6–8	250	Senior	New York, New York
14	Mike Vantrimpont	Center	7–0	220	Junior	Los Angeles, California
15	Kris Gulley	Guard/Forward	6–7	175	Sophomore	Dallas, Texas
20	T. J. Robinson	Forward	6–8	205	Senior	West Haven, Connecticut
21	Larry Anderson	Guard	6–5	210	Senior	Long Beach, California
22	Casper Ware	Guard	5–10	175	Senior	Cerritos, California
23	Sean Starkey	Guard/Forward	6–4	190	Senior	Huntington Beach, California
24	Gatete Djuma	Forward	6–9	220	Freshman	Salt Lake City, Utah
25	Jerramy King	Guard	5–11	170	Junior	La Canada, California
33	Nick Shepherd	Forward	6–9	218	Freshman	Missouri City, Texas
34	Kyle Richardson	Forward	6–7	225	Junior	Lakewood, California
35	Dan Jennings	Forward	6–9	255	Junior	Staten Island, New York

== Schedule ==
Date time, TV	Rank^{#}	Opponent^{#}	Result	Record	Site (attendance) city, state
Regular season
11/12/2011*; 2:00 pm		Idaho	W 69–61	1–0	Walter Pyramid (4,348); Long Beach, CA
11/16/2011*; 6:00 pm, ESPNU		at No. 9 Pittsburgh	W 86–76	2–0	Petersen Events Center (8,215); Pittsburgh, PA
11/19/2011*; 1:30 pm, 4SD		at San Diego State	L 73–77 ^{OT}	2–1	Viejas Arena (12,094); San Diego, CA
11/22/2011*; 7:05 pm		Boise State	W 72–62	3–1	Walter Pyramid (3,866); Long Beach, CA
11/26/2011*; 6:00 pm		at Montana	L 71–73	3–2	Dahlberg Arena (3,529); Missoula, MT
11/28/2011*; 4:00 pm, ESPNU		at No. 6 Louisville	L 66–79	3–3	KFC Yum! Center (20,468); Louisville, KY
12/02/2011*; 7:05 pm		BYU–Hawaiʻi	W 79–43	4–3	Walter Pyramid (3,214); Long Beach, CA
12/06/2011*; 6:00 pm, ESPNU		at No. 13 Kansas	L 80–88	4–4	Allen Fieldhouse (16,300); Lawrence, KS
12/10/2011*; 4:00 pm, ESPN3		at No. 6 North Carolina	L 78–84	4–5	Dean E. Smith Center (20,426); Chapel Hill, NC
12/19/2011*; 8:05 pm		Eastern New Mexico	W 76–54	5–5	Walter Pyramid (2,403); Long Beach, CA
12/22/2011*; 8:00 pm, ESPNU		vs. No. 14 Xavier; Diamond Head Classic first round	W 68–58	6–5	Stan Sheriff Center (NA); Honolulu, HI
12/23/2011*; 8:00 pm, ESPN2		vs. Auburn; Diamond Head Classic semifinals	W 64–43	7–5	Stan Sheriff Center (NA); Honolulu, HI
12/25/2011*; 7:00 pm, ESPN2		vs. Kansas State; Diamond Head Classic Championship Game	L 60–77	7–6	Stan Sheriff Center (6,270); Honolulu, HI
01/02/2012; 7:00 pm		at UC Irvine	W 74–60	8–6 (1–0)	Bren Events Center (1,246); Irvine, CA
01/05/2012; 7:05 pm		Cal Poly	W 55–50	9–6 (2–0)	Walter Pyramid (2,662); Long Beach, CA
01/07/2012; 7:00 pm		at Cal State Northridge	W 81–68	10–6 (3–0)	Matadome (1,459); Northridge, CA
01/12/2012; 7:05 pm		UC Davis	W 86–58	11–6 (4–0)	Walter Pyramid (2,278); Long Beach, CA
01/14/2012; 4:05 pm, Prime Ticket		Pacific	W 76–66	12–6 (5–0)	Walter Pyramid (2,660); Long Beach, CA
01/19/2012; 7:00 pm		at Cal Poly	W 78–69	13–6 (6–0)	Mott Gym (2,779); San Luis Obispo, CA
01/21/2012; 8:00 pm, ESPNU		at UC Santa Barbara	W 71–48	14–6 (7–0)	The Thunderdome (6,000); Santa Barbara, CA
01/26/2012; 7:00 pm		at UC Riverside	W 77–70 ^{OT}	15–6 (8–0)	UC Riverside Student Recreation Center (1,298); Riverside, CA
01/28/2012; 8:00 pm, ESPNU		Cal State Fullerton	W 75–61	16–6 (9–0)	Walter Pyramid (5,649); Long Beach, CA
02/04/2012; 7:30 pm		Cal State Northridge	W 75–67	17–6 (10–0)	Walter Pyramid (4,007); Long Beach, CA
02/09/2012; 7:30 pm		at Pacific	W 74–66	18–6 (11–0)	Alex G. Spanos Center (2,604); Stockton, CA
02/11/2012; 7:00 pm		at UC Davis	W 89–69	19–6 (12–0)	The Pavilion (1,808); Davis, CA
02/18/2012*; 7:00 pm, ESPN2		at Creighton; ESPN BracketBusters	L 79–81	19–7 (12–0)	CenturyLink Center Omaha (16,503); Omaha, NE
02/22/2012; 8:00 pm, ESPN2		UC Santa Barbara	W 70–58	20–7 (13–0)	Walter Pyramid (4,732); Long Beach, CA
02/25/2012; 4:05 pm		UC Riverside	W 64–40	21–7 (14–0)	Walter Pyramid (3,842); Long Beach, CA
02/29/2012; 8:05 pm		UC Irvine	W 77–50	22–7 (15–0)	Walter Pyramid (3,785); Long Beach, CA
03/03/2012; 4:00 pm, FS West		at Cal State Fullerton	L 74–77	22–8 (15–1)	Titan Gym (3,458); Fullerton, CA
2012 Big West Conference men's basketball tournament
03/08/2012; 6:00 pm		vs. UC Davis; Quarterfinals	W 80–46	23–8	Honda Center (3,917); Anaheim, CA
03/09/2012; 6:30 pm, ESPNU		vs. UC Irvine; Semifinals	W 68–57	24–8	Honda Center (5,171); Anaheim, CA
03/10/2012; 7:00 pm, ESPN2		vs. UC Santa Barbara; Championship Game	W 77–64	25–8	Honda Center (7,564); Anaheim, CA
2012 NCAA tournament
03/15/2012*; 1:10 pm, TBS	(12 W)	vs. (5 W) No. 21 New Mexico; First Round	L 68–75	25–9	Rose Garden (17,519); Portland, OR
*Non-conference game. ^{#}Rankings from AP Poll. (#) Tournament seedings in parentheses. All times are in Pacific Time (#) during NCAA Tournament is seed with Region.
