= 2012 Big West Conference men's basketball tournament =

- Classification: Division I
- Season: 2011–12
- Teams: 8
- Site: Honda Center; Anaheim, California
- Champions: Long Beach State (5th title)
- Winning coach: Dan Monson (1st title)
- MVP: Casper Ware (Long Beach State)
- Attendance: 7,564
- Television: ESPNU/ESPN2

2011–12 Big West men's basketball standings
	Conf.				Overall
Team	W		L	PCT	W		L	PCT
Long Beach State †	15	–	1	.938	25	–	9	.735
Cal State Fullerton	12	–	4	.750	21	–	10	.677
UC Santa Barbara	12	–	4	.750	20	–	11	.645
Cal Poly	8	–	8	.500	18	–	15	.545
UC Riverside	7	–	9	.438	14	–	17	.452
Pacific	6	–	10	.375	11	–	19	.367
UC Irvine	6	–	10	.375	12	–	20	.375
UC Davis	3	–	13	.188	5	–	26	.161
Cal State Northridge*	3	–	13	.188	7	–	21	.250
† 2012 Big West tournament winner As of March 15, 2012; Rankings from AP Poll; *Ineligible for conference tournament due to low APR

The 2012 Big West Conference men's basketball tournament took place March 8–10, 2012 at the Honda Center in Anaheim, California. The Tournament was previously held at the Anaheim Convention Center. Long Beach State won the tournament, which allowed them to receive the conference's automatic bid to the 2012 NCAA Division I men's basketball tournament. Cal State Northridge was banned from competing in postseason play for failing to meet the NCAA's Academic Progress Rate requirements.

== Format ==
Eight teams qualified for the 2012 Big West tournament. In the semifinals the highest seed will play the lowest seed, while the remaining two teams match up.

== Bracket ==
Quarterfinals; March 8, 2012
1	Long Beach State	80
8	UC Davis	46
2	Cal State Fullerton	59
7	UC Irvine	65
(Pairings are reseeded after the first round)
3	UC Santa Barbara	72
6	Pacific	52
4	Cal Poly	66
5	UC Riverside	54

Semifinals; March 9, 2012
1	Long Beach State	68
7	UC Irvine	57
3	UC Santa Barbara	64
4	Cal Poly	52

Championship Game; March 10, 2012
1	Long Beach State	77
3	UC Santa Barbara	64
