= 2011–12 UC Irvine Anteaters men's basketball team =

American college basketball season

2011–12 UC Irvine Anteaters men's basketball
- Conference: Big West Conference
- Record: 12–20 (6–10 Big West)
- Head coach: Russell Turner (2nd season)
- Assistant coaches: Ali Ton; Ryan Badrtalei; Nick Booker
- Home arena: Bren Events Center

2011–12 Big West men's basketball standings
	Conf.				Overall
Team	W		L	PCT	W		L	PCT
Long Beach State †	15	–	1	.938	25	–	9	.735
Cal State Fullerton	12	–	4	.750	21	–	10	.677
UC Santa Barbara	12	–	4	.750	20	–	11	.645
Cal Poly	8	–	8	.500	18	–	15	.545
UC Riverside	7	–	9	.438	14	–	17	.452
Pacific	6	–	10	.375	11	–	19	.367
UC Irvine	6	–	10	.375	12	–	20	.375
UC Davis	3	–	13	.188	5	–	26	.161
Cal State Northridge*	3	–	13	.188	7	–	21	.250
† 2012 Big West tournament winner As of March 15, 2012; Rankings from AP Poll; *Ineligible for conference tournament due to low APR

The 2011–12 UC Irvine Anteaters men's basketball team represented the University of California, Irvine during the 2011–12 NCAA Division I men's basketball season. The Anteaters, led by second year head coach Russell Turner, played their home games at the Bren Events Center and were members of the Big West Conference. They finished the season 12–20, 6–10 in Big West play to finish tied for sixth place.

== Off-Season ==
=== 2011 Recruiting Class ===
College recruiting information
Name	Hometown	School	Height	Weight	Commit date
Will Davis II; PF	Sacramento, CA	New Hampton School	6 ft 8 in (2.03 m)	210 lb (95 kg)	May 16, 2011
Will Davis II; PF	Recruit ratings: ESPN: (88)				
Aaron Wright; PG	Cerritos, CA	Cerritos High School	6 ft 2 in (1.88 m)	165 lb (75 kg)	Apr 27, 2011
Aaron Wright; PG	Recruit ratings: ESPN: (87)				
Collin Woods; PG	Scottsdale, AZ	Horizon High School	6 ft 2 in (1.88 m)	165 lb (75 kg)	Nov 18, 2010
Collin Woods; PG	Recruit ratings: ESPN: (85)				
Marcus Bardley; PF	Newport Beach, CA	Corona Del Mar High School	6 ft 6 in (1.98 m)	220 lb (100 kg)	May 20, 2011
Marcus Bardley; PF	Recruit ratings: ESPN: (81)				
Reed McConnell; SG	Oakland, CA	Sacred Heart Cathedral Preparatory	6 ft 5 in (1.96 m)	195 lb (88 kg)	Nov 18, 2010
Reed McConnell; SG	Recruit ratings: ESPN: (78)				
Thanos Thodos; C	Lee, ME	Lee Academy	7 ft 0 in (2.13 m)	240 lb (110 kg)	Nov 18, 2010
Thanos Thodos; C	Recruit ratings: ESPN: (74)				
Overall recruit ranking: Scout: n/a Rivals: n/a ESPN: n/a
Note: In many cases, Scout, Rivals, 247Sports, On3, and ESPN may conflict in their listings of height and weight.; In these cases, the average was taken. ESPN grades are on a 100-point scale.; Sources: "ESPN - UC Irvine Basketball Recruiting 2011". ESPN.; "2011 Team Ranking". Rivals.

== Roster ==
2011–12 UC Irvine Anteaters men's basketball team
Players
Coaches

Pos.	#	Name	Height	Weight	Year	Hometown
G	0	Derick Flowers	6 ft 0 in (1.83 m)	180 lb (82 kg)	Jr	Los Angeles, CA
F	1	Marcus Bradley	6 ft 5 in (1.96 m)	215 lb (98 kg)	Fr	San Bernardino, CA
F	2	Travis Souza	6 ft 5 in (1.96 m)	215 lb (98 kg)	Fr	Turlock, CA
F/C	3	Will Davis II	6 ft 8 in (2.03 m)	210 lb (95 kg)	Fr	Sacramento, CA
F	4	Reed McConnell	6 ft 5 in (1.96 m)	190 lb (86 kg)	Fr	Atherton, CA
G	5	Chris McNealy	6 ft 4 in (1.93 m)	180 lb (82 kg)	So	Danville, CA
G	10	Collin Woods	6 ft 1 in (1.85 m)	175 lb (79 kg)	Fr	Scottsdale, AZ
C	20	Adam Folker	6 ft 9 in (2.06 m)	230 lb (104 kg)	RS Jr	Markham, ON (Canada)
G	22	Daman Starring	6 ft 3 in (1.91 m)	190 lb (86 kg)	Jr	Las Vegas, NV
G/F	23	Michael Wilder	6 ft 2 in (1.88 m)	215 lb (98 kg)	Jr	Long Beach, CA
C	25	John Ryan	6 ft 10 in (2.08 m)	260 lb (118 kg)	RS So	El Segundo, CA
G	32	Aaron Wright	6 ft 3 in (1.91 m)	185 lb (84 kg)	Fr	Cerritos, CA
C	33	Mike Best	6 ft 10 in (2.08 m)	200 lb (91 kg)	Fr	San Rafael, CA

Head coach

- Russell Turner (Hampden–Sydney)

Assistant coach(es)

- Ali Ton (Davidson)
- Ryan Badrtalei (UCLA)
- Nick Booker (Davidson)

Legend

- (C) Team captain
- (S) Suspended
- (I) Ineligible
- (W) Walk-on
- Injured
- Current redshirt

Roster
Last update: 2/19/2021

== Schedule ==
Date time, TV	Rank^{#}	Opponent^{#}	Result	Record	Site (attendance) city, state
Regular season
November 11, 2011*; 7:30 pm		at No. 24 California	L 56–77	0–1	Haas Pavilion (5,305); Berkeley, CA
November 14, 2011*; 7:00 pm		at San Jose State	L 50–51	0–2	Event Center Arena (1,263); San Jose, CA
November 19, 2011; 4:30 pm		Weber State; Homecoming	L 72–80	0–3	Bren Events Center (1,655); Irvine, CA
November 24*; 8:30 pm		vs. Southern Miss; Great Alaska Shootout	L 67–78	0–4	Sullivan Arena (4,278); Anchorage, AK
November 25, 2011*; 2:00 pm		vs. Central Michigan; Great Alaska Shootout	L 72–82	0–5	Sullivan Arena (4,264); Anchorage, AK
November 26, 2011*; 12:00 pm		vs. Alaska Anchorage; Great Alaska Shootout	L 63–77	0–6	Sullivan Arena (4,318); Anchorage, AK
December 3, 2011*; 7:00 pm		San Diego	W 99–79	1–6	Bren Events Center (1,186); Irvine, CA
December 10, 2011*; 7:00 pm		Vanguard	W 75–73	2–6	Bren Events Center (671); Irvine, CA
December 13, 2011*; 7:00 pm		at Wyoming	L 48–58	2–7	Arena-Auditorium (4,084); Laramie, WY
December 15, 2011*; 7:00 pm		at LSU	L 59–66	2–8	Pete Maravich Assembly Center (7,469); Baton Rouge, LA
December 20, 2011*; 7:30 pm		at UCLA	L 60–89	2–9	Los Angeles Memorial Sports Arena (4,090); Los Angeles, CA
December 22, 2011*; 7:00 pm		Hope International	W 76–54	3–9	Bren Events Center (755); Irvine, CA
December 29, 2011; 7:05 pm		at Cal State Northridge	W 71–62	4–9 (1–0)	Matadome (959); Northridge, CA
January 2, 2012; 7:00 pm		Long Beach State	L 60–74	4–10 (1–1)	Bren Events Center (1,246); Irvine, CA
January 5, 2012; 7:00 pm		at Pacific	W 73–69	5–10 (2–1)	Alex G. Spanos Center (1,976); Stockton, CA
January 7, 2012; 7:00 pm		at UC Davis	W 70–55	6–10 (3–1)	The Pavilion (1,042); Davis, CA
January 12, 2012; 7:00 pm		Cal Poly	L 50–66	6–11 (3–2)	Bren Events Center (1,790); Irvine, CA
January 14, 2012; 7:00 pm		at UC Santa Barbara	L 56–74	6–12 (3–3)	Thunderdome (2,607); Santa Barbara, CA
January 21, 2012; 7:00 pm		Cal State Fullerton	L 84–92	6–13 (3–4)	Bren Events Center (1,521); Irvine, CA
January 24, 2012*; 7:00 pm		Seattle	W 78–67	7–13	Bren Events Center (671); Irvine, CA
January 28, 2012; 5:00 pm		UC Riverside	W 65–57	8–13 (4–4)	Bren Events Center (3,382); Irvine, CA
February 2, 2012; 7:35 pm		UC Davis	W 68–61	9–13 (5–4)	Bren Events Center (858); Irvine, CA
February 4, 2012; 7:00 pm		Pacific	L 64–72	9–14 (5–5)	Bren Events Center (3,003); Irvine, CA
February 9, 2012; 7:05 pm		at Cal State Fullerton	L 94–100	9–15 (5–6)	Titan Gym (923); Fullerton, CA
February 11, 2012; 7:05 pm		at Cal Poly	L 74–77	9–16 (5–7)	Mott Gym (2,753); San Luis Obispo, CA
February 15, 2012; 7:00 pm		UC Santa Barbara	L 62–85	9–17 (5–8)	Bren Events Center (1,372); Irvine, CA
February 18, 2012*; 7:05 pm		Eastern Washington; Sears BracketBusters Game	W 78–73	10–17	Bren Events Center (1,094); Irvine, CA
February 25, 2012; 7:30 pm		Cal State Northridge	W 94–85	11–17 (6–8)	Bren Events Center (1,480); Irvine, CA
February 29, 2012; 7:05 pm		at Long Beach State	L 50–77	11–18 (6–9)	Walter Pyramid (3,785); Long Beach, CA
March 3, 2012; 5:20 pm		at UC Riverside	L 69–72	11–19 (6–10)	SRC (2,185); Riverside, CA
Big West tournament
March 8, 2012; 2:15 pm		vs. Cal State Fullerton; Quarterfinals	W 65–59	12–19	Honda Center (3,917); Anaheim, CA
March 9, 2012; 6:30 pm		vs. Long Beach State; Semifinals	L 57–68	12–20	Honda Center (5,171); Anaheim, CA
*Non-conference game. ^{#}Rankings from AP Poll. (#) Tournament seedings in parentheses. All times are in Pacific Time.
