= 2011–12 Idaho Vandals men's basketball team =

American college basketball season

2011–12 Idaho Vandals men's basketball

CIT, Second Round
- Conference: Western Athletic Conference
- Record: 19–14 (9–5 WAC)
- Head coach: Don Verlin
- Assistant coaches: Ray Lopes; Mike Freeman; Tim Murphy
- Home arena: Cowan Spectrum, Memorial Gym

2011–12 WAC men's basketball standings
	Conf.				Overall
Team	W		L	PCT	W		L	PCT
Nevada	13	–	1	.929	28	–	7	.800
New Mexico State†	10	–	4	.714	26	–	10	.722
Idaho	9	–	5	.643	19	–	14	.576
Utah State	8	–	6	.571	21	–	16	.568
Louisiana Tech	6	–	8	.429	18	–	16	.529
Hawaii	6	–	8	.429	16	–	16	.500
Fresno State	3	–	11	.214	13	–	20	.394
San Jose State	1	–	13	.071	9	–	22	.290
† 2012 WAC tournament winner Rankings from AP poll

The 2011–12 Idaho Vandals men's basketball team represented the University of Idaho during the 2011–12 NCAA Division I men's basketball season. The team played the first part of their season at Memorial Gym while waiting for the football season to end, then played where the football team plays in the Cowan Spectrum in Moscow, Idaho. They are members of the Western Athletic Conference and were led by fourth-year head coach Don Verlin. They finished the season 19–14, 9–5 in WAC play to finish in third place. They lost in the quarterfinals of the WAC Basketball tournament to Hawaiʻi. They were invited to the 2012 CollegeInsider.com Tournament where they defeated UC Santa Barbara in the first round before falling in the second round to fellow WAC member Utah State.

== Roster ==
Name	Number	Position	Height	Weight	Year	Hometown
Djim Bandoumel	15	Forward	6–8	215	Senior	Quebec City, Quebec, Canada
Mike McChristian	12	Guard	6–2	220	Junior	Vacaville, California
Kyle Barone	33	Center	6–10	220	Junior	Garden Grove, California
Matt Borton	20	Guard	6–5	180	Freshman	Yakima, Washington
Deremy Geiger	35	Guard	5–11	170	Senior	Las Vegas, Nevada
Mansa Habeeb	3	Guard	6–3	220	Junior	Buffalo, New York
Joe Kammerer	42	Center	6–9	241	Sophomore	Eugene, Oregon
Stephen Madison	34	Forward	6–5	215	Sophomore	Portland, Oregon
Sheridan Shayne	4	Guard	6–0	170	Junior	Boise, Idaho
Landon Tatum	10	Guard	5–11	196	Senior	San Antonio, Texas
Connor Hill	5	Guard	6–2	185	Freshman	Post Falls, Idaho
Wendell Faines	45	Forward	6–8	245	Junior	Lincoln, Nebraska

== Schedule ==
Date time, TV	Rank^{#}	Opponent^{#}	Result	Record	Site (attendance) city, state
Exhibition
October 28, 2011*; 7:05 p.m.		Evergreen State	W 96–72	–	Memorial Gym (N/A); Moscow, Idaho
November 5, 2011*; 7:05 p.m.		Willamette	W 114–73	–	Memorial Gym (N/A); Moscow, Idaho
Regular Season
November 12, 2011*; 2:05 p.m.		at Long Beach State	L 61–69	0–1	Walter Pyramid (4,348); Long Beach, California
November 14, 2011*; 7:05 p.m.		Concordia	W 77–61	1–1	Memorial Gym (720); Moscow, Idaho
November 17, 2011*; 6:00 p.m.		at Montana	L 52–57	1–2	Dahlberg Arena (2,684); Missoula, Montana
November 23, 2011*; 6:05 p.m.		vs. Lewis–Clark State	W 80–75	2–2	CenturyLink Arena (2,578); Boise, Idaho
November 26, 2011*; 7:05 p.m.		Montana State	W 76–67	3–2	Memorial Gym (906); Moscow, Idaho
November 30, 2011*; 8:00 p.m.		Eastern Washington	L 66–73	3–3	Memorial Gym (1,057); Moscow, Idaho
December 3, 2011*; 2:00 p.m.		UC Davis	W 94–74	4–3	The Pavilion (882); Davis, California
December 7, 2011*; 7:05 p.m.		Washington State	L 64–66	4–4	Cowan Spectrum (3,321); Moscow, Idaho
December 9, 2011*; 7:00 p.m., ROOT NW		at Oregon State	W 74–60	5–4	Gill Coliseum (5,119); Corvallis, Oregon
December 11, 2011*; 3:00 p.m.		at Seattle	W 73–62	6–4	KeyArena (2,630); Seattle, Washington
December 17, 2011*; 7:05 p.m.		Cal State Bakersfield	W 72–44	7–4	Cowan Spectrum (815); Moscow, Idaho
December 20, 2011*; 4:00 p.m.		at Wright State	L 78–80 ^{OT}	7–5	Nutter Center (3,040); Dayton, Ohio
December 22, 2011*; 6:00 p.m.		at Green Bay	L 61–63	7–6	Kress Events Center (2,514); Green Bay, Wisconsin
December 31, 2011*; 11:00 a.m.		vs. Boise State	L 73–76	7–7	Idaho Center (7,540); Nampa, Idaho
January 5, 2012; 7:05 p.m.		Nevada	L 55–73	7–8 (0–1)	Cowan Spectrum (1,081); Moscow, Idaho
January 7, 2012; 3:05 p.m., WAC Sports Network		Fresno State	W 63–59	8–8 (1–1)	Cowan Spectrum (1,303); Moscow, Idaho
January 12, 2012; 4:00 p.m., ERT/Altitude		at Louisiana Tech	W 90–88	9–8 (2–1)	Thomas Assembly Center (4,472); Ruston, Louisiana
January 14, 2012; 6:00 p.m., ESPN3		at New Mexico State	L 68–80	9–9 (2–2)	Pan American Center (5,306); Las Cruces, New Mexico
January 21, 2012; 7:00 p.m.		Utah State	W 57–54	10–9 (3–2)	Cowan Spectrum (2,359); Moscow, Idaho
January 26, 2012; 7:05 p.m.		San Jose State	W 74–66	11–9 (4–2)	Cowan Spectrum (1,173); Moscow, ID
January 28, 2011; 8:05 p.m., ERT/Altitude		Hawaiʻi	L 70–76	11–10 (4–3)	Cowan Spectrum (1,926); Moscow, ID
February 2, 2012; 7:00 p.m.		at Fresno State	L 55–65	11–11 (4–4)	Save Mart Center (6,080); Fresno, California
February 4, 2012; 7:00 p.m.		at Nevada	W 72–68	12–11 (5–4)	Lawlor Events Center (7,349); Reno, Nevada
February 7, 2012*; 7:00 p.m.		Seattle	W 70–69	13–11	Cowan Spectrum (803); Moscow, ID
February 9, 2012; 8:00 p.m.		New Mexico State	W 59–58	14–11 (6–4)	Cowan Spectrum (1,159); Moscow, ID
February 11, 2012; 8:00 p.m.		Louisiana Tech	W 73–64	15–11 (7–4)	Cowan Spectrum (1,843); Moscow, ID
February 18, 2012*; 7:05 p.m.		Portland State; ESPN BracketBusters	W 77–68	16–11	Cowan Spectrum ( 3,081); Moscow, ID
February 24, 2012; 6:00 p.m., KMYU/ESPN3		at Utah State	L 50–67	16–12 (7–5)	Smith Spectrum (10,178); Logan, Utah
March 1, 2012; 9:00 p.m., OC Sports		at Hawaiʻi	W 82–63	17–12 (8–5)	Stan Sheriff Center (5,600); Honolulu, Hawaii
March 3, 2012; 7:00 p.m.		San Jose State	W 70–64	18–12 (9–5)	The Event Center Arena (1,822); San Jose, California
WAC tournament
March 8, 2012; 12:00 p.m.		vs. Hawaiʻi; Quarterfinals	L 70–72	18–13	Orleans Arena (1,902); Las Vegas, Nevada
2012 CIT
March 14, 2012*; 6:00 p.m.		UC Santa Barbara; First Round	W 86–83	19–13	Cowan Spectrum (1,203); Moscow, ID
March 17, 2012*; 6:00 p.m.		at Utah State; Second Round	L 56–76	19–14	Smith Spectrum (2,430); Logan, UT
*Non-conference game. ^{#}Rankings from AP Poll. (#) Tournament seedings in parentheses. All times are in Pacific Time.
