= David Carter (basketball) =

American college basketball coach

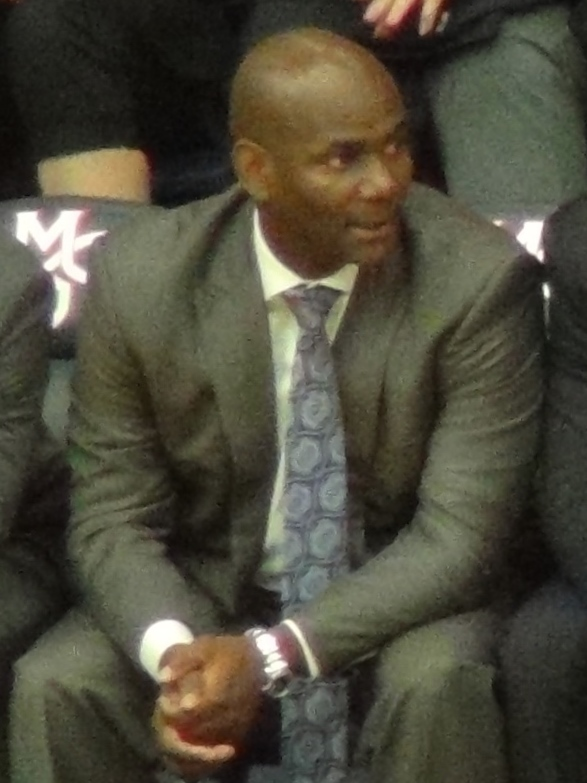
- Carter in 2016 at McKeon Pavilion

Current position
- Title: Assistant coach
- Team: Loyola Marymount
- Conference: WCC

Biographical details
- Born: March 12, 1967 (age 59); Los Angeles, California, U.S.

Playing career
- 1985–1989: Saint Mary's
- Position: Point guard

Coaching career (HC unless noted)
- 1989–1990: Washington (GA)
- 1992–1995: Diablo Valley CC (assistant)
- 1995–1997: Eastern Washington (assistant)
- 1997–1999: Saint Mary's (assistant)
- 1999–2005: Nevada (assistant)
- 2005–2009: Nevada (associate HC)
- 2009–2015: Nevada
- 2015–2017: Saint Mary's (assistant)
- 2017–2018: Georgia (assistant)
- 2018–2020: San Diego (assistant)
- 2020–present: Loyola Marymount (assistant)

Head coaching record
- Overall: 98–97
- Tournaments: 3–2 (NIT)

Accomplishments and honors

Championships
- WAC regular season (2012)

Awards
- WAC Coach of the Year (2012)

David Allen Carter (born March 12, 1967) is an American college basketball coach who is an assistant coach at Loyola Marymount University.

From 1999 to 2009, Carter was an assistant at the University of Nevada, Reno, under Trent Johnson from 1999 to 2004 and Mark Fox from 2004 to 2009, including as associate head coach beginning in 2005.

On April 3, 2009, Carter became head coach after Fox left to become head coach at Georgia.

Carter was fired by the University of Nevada, Reno in March 2015. In June, Carter re-joined Saint Mary's as assistant coach, this time under Randy Bennett. Carter was an assistant at Saint Mary's from 1997 to 1999 under Dave Bollwinkel.

On June 7, 2017, Carter was once again hired by Fox as an assistant coach, this time for Georgia, replacing former assistant Yasir Rosemond. After Fox was fired at the end of the season, Carter was not retained under new head coach Tom Crean.

On June 11, 2018, Carter was hired by San Diego as assistant coach under Sam Scholl.

On April 8, 2020, Carter was announced as a part of Stan Johnson's first coaching staff at Loyola Marymount.

== Head coaching record ==
Record table
Season	Team	Overall	Conference	Standing	Postseason
Nevada Wolf Pack (Western Athletic Conference) (2009–2012)
2009–10	Nevada	21–13	11–5	T–2nd	NIT Second Round
2010–11	Nevada	13–19	8–8	T–5th	
2011–12	Nevada	28–7	13–1	1st	NIT Quarterfinal
Nevada Wolf Pack (Mountain West Conference) (2012–2015)
2012–13	Nevada	12–19	3–13	9th	
2013–14	Nevada	15–17	10–8	T–3rd	
2014–15	Nevada	9–22	5–13	10th	
Nevada:		98–97 (.503)	50–48 (.510)		
Total:		98–97 (.503)			
National champion Postseason invitational champion Conference regular season champion Conference regular season and conference tournament champion Division regular season champion Division regular season and conference tournament champion Conference tournament champion
