= Jack Spencer (basketball) =

American basketball player and coach

Biographical details
- Born: April 25, 1923; Davenport, Iowa, U.S.
- Died: June 15, 2004 (aged 81); Davenport, Iowa, U.S.

Playing career
- 1943–1948: Iowa
- 1948–1949: Waterloo Hawks
- Position: Forward

Coaching career (HC unless noted)
- 1949–1950: Iowa (assistant)
- 1954–1959: Iowa Wesleyan
- 1959–1972: Nevada
- 1972–1988: Nevada (assistant)

Head coaching record
- Overall: 123–199

Accomplishments and honors

Championships
- 3× Far West (1961, 1963, 1966)

Jackson Masten Spencer Jr. (April 25, 1923 – June 15, 2004) was an American college basketball coach. He was the head coach at Iowa Wesleyan University from 1954 to 1959 and at the University of Nevada, Reno from 1959 to 1972.

He died of chronic obstructive pulmonary disease on June 15, 2004, in Davenport, Iowa at age 81.
