= Deonte Burton (basketball, born 1991) =

American basketball player

Personal information
- Born: July 26, 1991 (age 35) Los Angeles, California, U.S.
- Listed height: 6 ft 1 in (1.85 m)
- Listed weight: 190 lb (86 kg)

Career information
- High school: Centennial (Compton, California)
- College: Nevada (2010–2014)
- NBA draft: 2014: undrafted
- Playing career: 2014–2020
- Position: Point guard

Career history
- 2014–2015: ratiopharm Ulm
- 2015–2016: Bakersfield Jam
- 2016–2017: Lille Métropole BC
- 2017–2020: Salt Lake City Stars
- 2019: Bendigo Braves

Career highlights
- WAC Player of the Year (2012); AP Honorable mention All-American (2012); First-team All-MWC (2014); First-team All-WAC (2012); WAC Freshman of the Year (2011)
- Stats at Basketball Reference

Deonte Deron Burton (born July 26, 1991) is an American Former professional basketball player. He completed his college career for the University of Nevada, where he was named an All-American in 2012.

== High school career ==
Burton, a 6'1" point guard, played for Centennial High School in Compton, California. He averaged 21 points, 6 rebounds and 5 assists per game as a senior and scored 2000 points in his career. He was named the 2010 division III winner of the John R. Wooden Award, given to the Los Angeles area high school player of the year for each California Interscholastic Federation division.

== College career ==
Following his high school career, Burton signed with Nevada and was an immediate impact player for the Wolf Pack. He started all 32 games, averaging 13.7 points and 3.5 assists. At the end of the season, Burton was named Western Athletic Conference (WAC) Freshman of the Year and an honorable mention all-conference pick.

As a sophomore in 2011–12, Burton improved on these numbers, averaging 14.8 points and 4.2 assists per game and leading Nevada to a WAC regular-season championship. At the end of the regular season, Burton was named WAC Player of the Year and a first team all-league pick. Burton also received national recognition when he was named an honorable mention All-American by the Associated Press. The Wolf Pack's season ended disappointingly, however, as they were upset in the 2012 WAC men's basketball tournament by Louisiana Tech, then were knocked out in the quarterfinals of the National Invitation Tournament by eventual champion Stanford.

== Professional career ==
=== ratiopharm Ulm (2014–2015) ===
After going undrafted in the 2014 NBA draft, Burton joined the Washington Wizards for the 2014 NBA Summer League. On September 25, 2014, he signed with the Sacramento Kings. However, he was later waived by the Kings on October 19, 2014. On November 3, 2014, he signed with ratiopharm Ulm of the Basketball Bundesliga. In 32 games for ratiopharm, he averaged 2.6 points, 2.0 rebounds and 1.7 assists per game.

=== Bakersfield Jam (2015–2016) ===
In July 2015, Burton joined the Philadelphia 76ers for the Utah Jazz Summer League. On September 16, he signed with the Phoenix Suns, but did not join the team for training camp. He was later waived by the Suns on October 6. On November 2, he was acquired by the Bakersfield Jam of the NBA Development League as an affiliate player of the Suns. On November 13, he made his debut for the Jam in a 104–87 loss to the Santa Cruz Warriors, recording six points, four rebounds, one assists, one steal and two blocks in 31 minutes off the bench.

=== Lille Métropole (2016–2017) ===
On August 5, 2016, Burton signed with Lille Métropole in the LNB Pro B.

=== Salt Lake City Stars (2017–2019) ===
On October 21, 2017, the Fort Wayne Mad Ants acquired the rights to Deonte Burton from the Northern Arizona Suns for a second-round pick in Saturday's NBA Gatorade League Draft. In October 2018 he was added to the roster of the Salt Lake City Stars.

=== Bendigo Braves (2019) ===
On March 29, 2019, he has signed a contract with NBL1 team Bendigo Braves.

=== Second Stint with Salt Lake City Stars (2019–2020) ===
On November 8, 2019, the Salt Lake City Stars included Burton in their opening night roster. Burton missed a game with an undisclosed issue in March 2020. He averaged 3.8 points and 1.5 assists per game.
