= Jim Carey (basketball) =

American basketball coach (1929–2006)

Biographical details
- Born: August 21, 1929; St. Louis, Missouri, U.S.
- Died: February 4, 2006 (aged 76); Wichita, Kansas, U.S.

Playing career
- 1953–1955: Moberly
- 1956–1957: Drake

Coaching career (HC unless noted)
- 1960–1972: Ellsworth
- 1972–1976: Arizona State (assistant)
- 1976–1980: Nevada
- 1982–1993: Garden City CC

Head coaching record
- Overall: 65–46 (college)

Jim Carey (August 21, 1929 – February 4, 2006) was an American college basketball coach. He was the head coach at the University of Nevada, Reno from 1976 to 1980.

He died of heart failure on February 4, 2006, in Wichita, Kansas at age 76.
