= Sam Scholl =

American college basketball coach (born 1977)

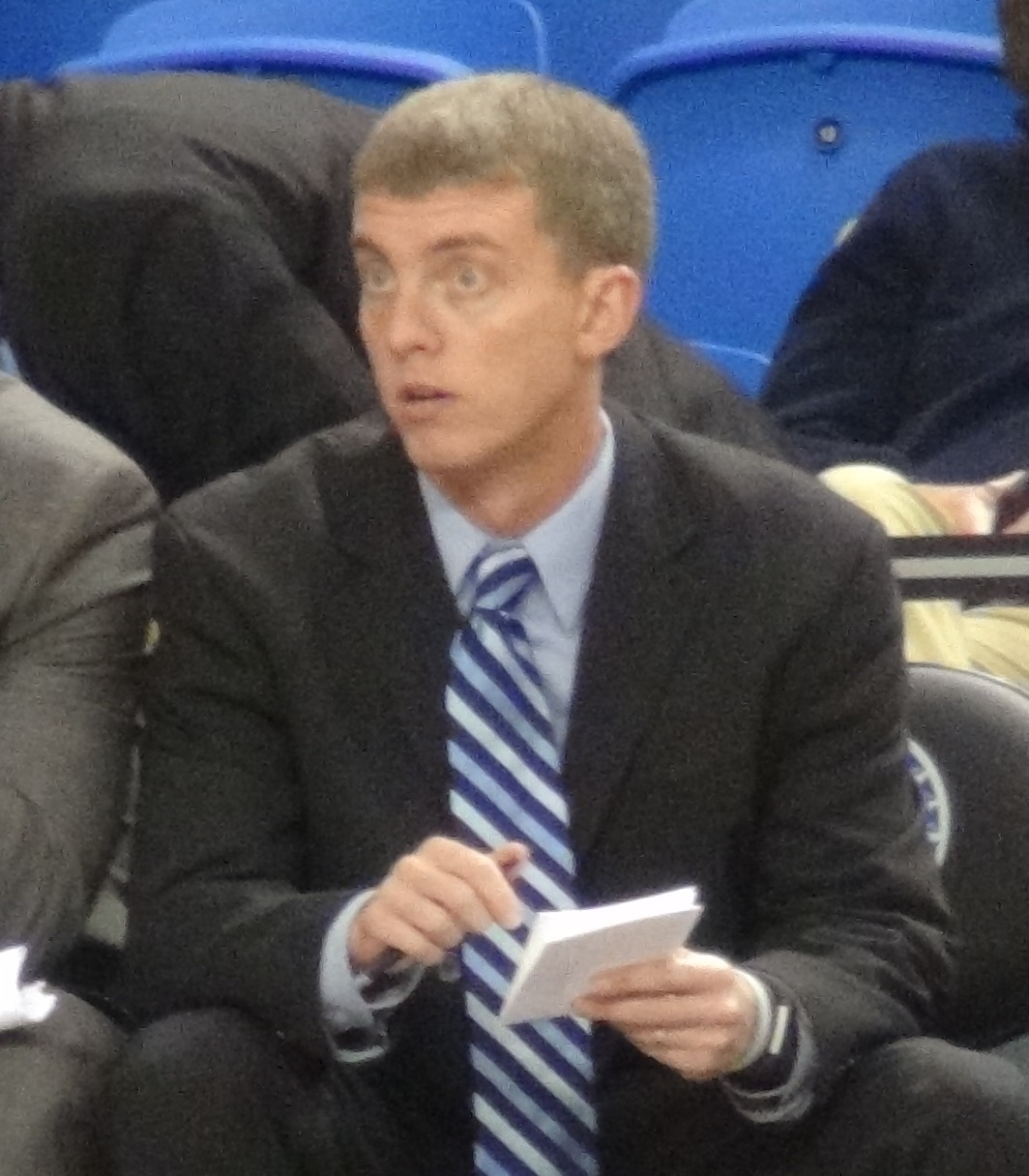
- Scholl in 2017

Current position
- Title: Assistant coach
- Team: Montana State
- Conference: Big Sky

Biographical details
- Born: November 11, 1977 (age 48); Gig Harbor, Washington, U.S.

Playing career
- 1996–1998: Tacoma CC
- 1998–2000: San Diego

Coaching career (HC unless noted)
- 2000–2007: San Diego (asst.)
- 2007–2015: Santa Clara (asst.)
- 2015–2018: San Diego (asst.)
- 2018–2022: San Diego
- 2023–present: Montana State (asst.)

Administrative career (AD unless noted)
- 2022–2023: San Diego State (advisor)

Head coaching record
- Overall: 50–66 (.431)
- Tournaments: 0–1 (NIT); 2–1 (CIT)

Samuel Elden Scholl (born November 11, 1977) is an American college basketball coach who is currently an assistant coach at Montana State University. He was previously the head men's basketball coach at the University of San Diego.

== Playing career ==
Scholl started his playing career at Tacoma Community College for two seasons before transferring to the University of San Diego to complete his playing eligibility under Brad Holland with the San Diego Toreros.

== Coaching career ==
After graduation, Scholl joined Holland's staff and stayed with the Toreros for seven seasons, where he was part of the team's 2003 NCAA tournament appearance. In 2007, Scholl joined Kerry Keating's staff at Santa Clara, where he stayed until 2015, and was a part of the school's 2011 CIT Championship and 2013 CBI Championship winning squads.

Scholl rejoined the Toreros staff under Lamont Smith. In February 2018, Smith was placed on leave pending a domestic violence charge against him, and resigned 10 days after his arrest, leaving Scholl to coach the team on an interim basis. Scholl coached the team in the 2018 CIT, reaching the quarterfinals before falling to eventual champion Northern Colorado.

On April 2, 2018, San Diego lifted the interim tag and named Scholl the permanent head coach, the 13th head coach in Toreros history.

On March 6, 2022, San Diego announced that Scholl would not return as head coach, ending his 4-season tenure.

== Head coaching record ==
=== NCAA DI ===
Record table
Season	Team	Overall	Conference	Standing	Postseason
San Diego (West Coast Conference) (2018–2022)
2017–18	San Diego	2–2^{‡}			CIT Quarterfinals
2018–19	San Diego	21–15	7–9	7th	NIT first round
2019–20	San Diego	9–23	2–14	9th	
2020–21	San Diego	3–10	2–7	9th	
2021–22	San Diego	15–16	7–9	7th	
San Diego:		50–66 (.431)	18–39 (.316)	‡ Scholl coached final 4 games.	
Total:		50–66 (.431)			
National champion Postseason invitational champion Conference regular season champion Conference regular season and conference tournament champion Division regular season champion Division regular season and conference tournament champion Conference tournament champion
