= Nevada Wolf Pack men's basketball =

Sports team of the University of Nevada at Reno

2026–27 Nevada Wolf Pack men's basketball team
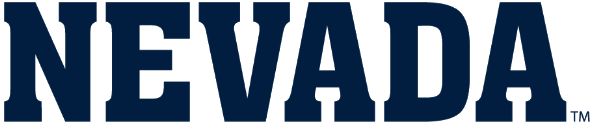
- University: University of Nevada, Reno
- Head coach: Steve Alford (8th season)
- Location: Reno, Nevada
- Arena: Lawlor Events Center (capacity: 13,678)
- Conference: Mountain West
- Nickname: Wolf Pack
- Colors: Navy blue and silver

NCAA Division I tournament Sweet Sixteen
- 2004, 2018

NCAA Division I tournament appearances
- 1957*, 1961*, 1964*, 1966*, 1984, 1985, 2004, 2005, 2006, 2007, 2017, 2018, 2019, 2023, 2024

Conference tournament champions
- 1984, 1985, 2004, 2006, 2017

Conference regular-season champions
- 1920, 1927, 1928, 1932, 1938, 1956, 1957, 1958, 1961, 1964, 1966, 1984, 1985, 1997, 2004, 2005, 2006, 2007, 2008, 2012, 2017, 2018, 2019

Uniforms
Home	Away	Alternate
- * at Division II level

The Nevada Wolf Pack men's basketball program is a college basketball team that represents the University of Nevada, Reno. The team is currently a member of the Mountain West Conference, which is a Division I conference in the National Collegiate Athletic Association (NCAA). The program began in 1913 and has won 23 regular season conference championships and five conference tournament championships. Nevada won a CBI title in 2016 vs. Morehead State, two games to one.

== Background information ==
- Year founded: 1913
- Location: Reno, Nevada
- School Colors: Navy and Silver
- School Founded: October 12, 1874
- Nickname: Wolf Pack
- Conference: Mountain West Conference
- Arena: Lawlor Events Center (11,536)
- Head Coach: Steve Alford

== Conference affiliations ==
- No affiliation (1913, 1921–1924, 1940–1953)
- Pacific Coast Athletic Association (PCAA) (1914–1920)
- Far Western Conference (FWC) (1925–1939, 1954–1969)
- West Coast Athletic Conference (WCAC) (1970–1979)
- Big Sky Conference (BSC) (1980–1992)
- Big West Conference (BWC) (1993–2000)
- Western Athletic Conference (WAC) (2001–2011)
- Mountain West Conference (MW) (2012–present)

== Team history ==
- All-Time D-1 Record: 1,028–793 (.564%) as of November 26, 2023
- NAIA Tournament Appearances: (1) – 1946
- NAIA Tournament Record: 2–1
- NCAA tournament Record: 6–11
- NCAA Tournament Appearances: (11) – 1984, 1985, 2004, 2005, 2006, 2007, 2017, 2018, 2019, 2023, 2024
- NIT Record: 4–4
- NIT Appearances: (5) – 1979, 1997, 2003, 2010, 2012
- CBI Record: 5–3
- CBI Appearances: (3) – 2008, 2009, 2016
- Highest National Ranking
  - No. 5 (Coaches Poll), December 31, 2018
  - No. 5 (Associated Press Poll), November 26, 2018

=== Regular Season Conference Championships (23) ===
- PCAA: (1) – 1920
- FWC: (10) – 1927, 1928, 1932, 1938, 1956, 1957, 1958,1959, 1961, 1964, 1966
- BSC: (2) – 1984, 1985
- WAC: (6) – 2004, 2005, 2006, 2007, 2008, 2012
- MW: (3) – 2017, 2018, 2019

=== Conference tournament championships (5) ===
- BSC: (2) – 1984, 1985
- WAC: (2) – 2004, 2006
- MW: (1) – 2017

=== Venue history ===
- University Gymnasium – built 1896, capacity unknown; located northwest of the Mackay School of Mines between the current Ansari Building and the Pennington Student Achievement Center
- Virginia Street Gymnasium – built 1945, capacity 3,500; located on Virginia Street opposite College Drive; currently used as a study and training center for Nevada athletes.
- Lawlor Events Center – built 1983, capacity 11,536; located at the corner of North Virginia Street and East 15th Street; current home of Wolf Pack basketball.
- Grand Sierra Resort Arena – Announced on September 27, 2023 as the centerpiece of a 10-year, $1 billion expansion of the casino resort. The new facility, planned with a capacity of at least 10,000 and originally scheduled for completion in 2026, will be exclusive to men's basketball; Lawlor Events Center will remain home to Wolf Pack women's basketball. Initial plans were for the Wolf Pack to start play in the new arena in 2026 or 2027; the tentative opening date has now been set for 2027.

=== Head coaches ===
Name	Seasons	Record	Percentage
C.E. Holway	1913–1913	3–1	.750
Silas Ross	1914–1919	33–21	.611
Ray Courtright	1920–1921	17–5	.773
Jake Lawlor	1943–1948	70–38	.648
Jim Aiken	1945	8–9	.471
Jackson Spencer	1970–1972	10–64	.135
Jim Padgett	1973–1976	43–61	.413
Jim Carey	1977–1980	65–46	.586
Sonny Allen	1981–1987	114–89	.562
Len Stevens	1988–1993	91–79	.535
Pat Foster	1994–1999	90–81	.526
Trent Johnson	2000–2004	79–74	.516
Mark Fox	2005–2009	123–43	.741
David Carter	2010–2015	98–97	.503
Eric Musselman	2016–2019	100–30	.769
Steve Alford	2019–	137-88	.609

== Postseason results ==
=== NCAA Division I tournament results ===
The Wolf Pack have appeared in the NCAA Division I tournament eleven times, with a combined record of 6–11.

Year	Seed	Round	Opponent	Result
1984	11 W	First round	(6) #15 Washington	L 54–64
1985	14 W	First round	(3) #16 NC State	L 56–65
2004	10 M	First round Second Round; Sweet Sixteen	(7) Michigan State (2) #3 Gonzaga (3) #14 Georgia Tech	W 72–66; W 91–72; L 67–72
2005	9 M	First round Second Round	(8) Texas (1) #1 Illinois	W 61–57; L 59–71
2006	5 M	First round	(12) Montana	L 79–87
2007	7 S	First round Second Round	(10) Creighton (2) #5 Memphis	W 77–71^{OT} L 62–78
2017	12 M	First round	(5) #16 Iowa State	L 73–84
2018	7 S	First round Second Round; Sweet Sixteen	(10) Texas (2) #6 Cincinnati (11) Loyola–Chicago	W 87–83^{OT} W 75–73; L 68–69
2019	7 W	First round	(10) Florida	L 61–70
2023	11 W	First Four	(11) Arizona State	L 73–98
2024	10 W	First round	(7) Dayton	L 60–63

=== NCAA Division II Tournament results ===
The Wolf Pack have appeared in the NCAA Division II tournament four times. Their combined record is 1–6.

Year	Round	Opponent	Result
1957	Regional semifinals	Cal State Los Angeles	L 69–75
1961	Regional semifinals Regional 3rd-place game	UC Santa Barbara; Chapman	L 57–78; L 63–68
1964	Regional semifinals Regional 3rd-place game	Cal Poly Pomona; Seattle Pacific	L 71–99; L 74–76
1966	Regional semifinals Regional 3rd-place game	Fresno State; San Diego	L 78–127; W 74–71

=== NAIA Division I Tournament results ===
The Wolf Pack have appeared in the NAIA Division I Tournament one time. Their combined record is 2–1.

Year	Round	Opponent	Result
1946	First round Second Round; Quarterfinals	Morningside; West Texas State; Southern Illinois	W 56–40; W 60–46; L 58–66

=== NIT results ===
The Wolf Pack have appeared in the National Invitation Tournament (NIT) six times. Their combined record is 7-6.

Year	Round	Opponent	Result
1979	First round Second Round	Oregon State; Texas A&M	W 62–61; L 64–67
1997	First round Second Round	Fresno State; Nebraska	W 97–86; L 68–78
2003	First round	Texas Tech	L 54–66
2010	First round Second Round	Wichita State; Rhode Island	W 74–70; L 83–85
2012	First round Second Round; Quarterfinals	Oral Roberts; Bucknell; Stanford	W 68–59; W 75–67; L 56–84
2026	First round Second Round; Quarterfinals	Murray State; Liberty; Auburn	W 89–75; W 73–63; L 69–75

=== CBI results ===
The Wolf Pack have appeared in the College Basketball Invitational (CBI) three times. Their combined record is 5–3. They were CBI champions in 2016.

Year	Round	Opponent	Result
2008	First round	Houston	L 79–80
2009	First round	UTEP	L 77–79
2016	First round Quarterfinals; Semifinals; Finals–Game 1 Finals–Game 2 Finals–Game 3	Montana; Eastern Washington; Vermont; Morehead State; Morehead State; Morehead State	W 79–75; W 85–70; W 86–72; L 83–86; W 77–68; W 85–82^{OT}

== Player honors ==
=== Retired numbers ===
The Wolf Pack have two number officially retired, Edgar Jones' number 32, and Nick Fazekas's number 22.

Nevada Wolf Pack retired numbers
No.	Player	Tenure	No. ret.	Ref.
22	Nick Fazekas	2003–2007	2019	
32	Edgar Jones	1975–1979	1979	

=== Conference player of the year ===
- Kevin Soares, 1992 (Big Sky)
- Kirk Snyder, 2004 (WAC)
- Nick Fazekas, 2005, 2006, 2007 (WAC)
- Luke Babbitt, 2010 (WAC)
- Deonte Burton, 2012 (WAC)
- Caleb Martin, 2018 (Mountain West)

=== NBA players ===
- Luke Babbitt
- Nick Fazekas
- Jalen Harris
- Johnny High
- Edgar Jones
- Armon Johnson
- Caleb Martin
- Cody Martin
- JaVale McGee
- Cameron Oliver
- Kevinn Pinkney
- Kobe Sanders
- Ramon Sessions
- Kirk Snyder
- David Wood

=== International players ===
- Dario Hunt (born 1989), basketball player for Hapoel Haifa of the Israeli Basketball Premier League
- Cameron Oliver, basketball power forward/center in the Israeli Basketball Premier League
- Grant Sherfield (born 1999), basketball player in the Israeli Basketball Premier League
