= Colorado State Rams men's basketball =

2026–27 Colorado State Rams men's basketball team
- University: Colorado State University
- First season: 1901–1902
- Head coach: Ali Farokhmanesh (2nd season)
- Location: Fort Collins, Colorado
- Arena: Moby Arena (capacity: 8,083)
- Conference: Pac-12
- Nickname: Rams
- Colors: Green and gold
- All-time record: 1,419–1,349 (.513)

NCAA Division I tournament Elite Eight
- 1969

NCAA Division I tournament Sweet Sixteen
- 1954, 1969

NCAA Division I tournament appearances
- 1954, 1963, 1965, 1966, 1969, 1989, 1990, 2003, 2012, 2013, 2022, 2024, 2025

Conference tournament champions
- Mountain West; 2003, 2025

Conference regular-season champions
- WAC; 1989, 1990; Skyline; 1954, 1961

Uniforms
Home	Away

The Colorado State Rams men's basketball team are an intercollegiate men's basketball program representing Colorado State University. The school competes in the Pac-12 Conference in Division I of the National Collegiate Athletic Association (NCAA). The Colorado State Rams play home basketball games at Moby Arena in Fort Collins, Colorado, on the university campus. The Rams have reached the NCAA tournament 13 times, most recently in 2025.

== Team history ==
=== Early years (1901-1954) ===
Colorado State University's men's basketball program began during the 1901–02 season, when the school was known as Colorado Agricultural College. In 1910–11, the team joined the Rocky Mountain Athletic Conference. The institution was renamed Colorado State College of Agriculture and Mechanic Arts, commonly known as Colorado A&M, in 1935. During the 1938–39 season, the school followed several larger conference members in moving from the Rocky Mountain Athletic Conference to the Mountain States Conference, where it remained through the 1961–62 season. The program achieved its first NCAA Tournament appearance in 1954, reaching the Sweet 16 under head coach Bill Strannigan. From 1901 through 1954, the men's basketball team compiled an overall record of 284–409.

=== The Jim Williams era (1954-1980) ===
At 39 years old, Jim Williams arrived at Colorado State in 1954 after replacing Strannigan, who left for Iowa State University. In 1957, the institution officially became Colorado State University, although the “Aggies” nickname remained in use until 1966, when it was formally abolished and the Rams became the university's sole identity.

The 1960s marked the most successful decade of Williams’ tenure. Under his leadership, CSU earned four NCAA Tournament appearances and captured a conference championship in 1961. Williams guided the Rams to the NCAA Tournament in 1963, 1965, 1966, and 1969. The program's best postseason performance came in 1969, when CSU reached the Elite Eight after defeating in-state rival Colorado in the Sweet 16. This remains the deepest NCAA Tournament run in program history. Williams coached Bill Green, a consensus second team All-American in 1963. Williams and Colorado State famously beat UCLA in 1960 and 1961 coached by the legendary John Wooden.

In 1965, following the death of Athletic Director Bob Davis, Williams assumed the role of athletic director while continuing to coach the basketball team. During this period, he oversaw the construction of Moby Arena and Hughes Stadium. Williams returned to full-time head coaching duties at the start of the 1968 school year. During the 1969–70 season, Colorado State joined the Western Athletic Conference (WAC).

Williams was dismissed in 1980 but remained a visible presence at CSU basketball games, where he was honored with a special courtside seat. He was also among the first inductees into the CSU Sports Hall of Fame. Over 26 seasons as head coach, Williams recorded 352 wins, the most by any men's basketball coach in school history, solidifying his legacy as the greatest coach in the program's history.

=== The later WAC years (1980-1999) ===
In 1987, Boyd (Tiny) Grant was named head coach of Colorado State after serving as head coach at Fresno State for nine seasons. Grant first arrived at Colorado A&M in 1955, playing guard under Jim Williams. Shortly after his graduation, he returned to Colorado State in 1960 as an assistant coach under Williams, a role he held for 12 years before pursuing coaching head coaching opportunities at the junior college and Division I levels. As a head coach at Colorado State, he helped guide the program back to national relevance.

In his first season as head coach, the Rams took a major step forward finishing the 1987-88 season with a 22-13 record and making their first postseason appearance in more than two decades. The Rams finished third in the 1988 NIT that year. The next season, the Rams captured the 1989 WAC regular season title, falling in the WAC tournament championship game to UTEP. Led by star player Pat Durham, the Rams earned a No. 10 seed in the 1989 NCAA Tournament, advancing past Florida 68-46 in the first round before their run ended with a loss to Syracuse.

The program's success continued during the next season. CSU won the Mile High Classic at McNichols Sports Arena in Denver by upsetting No. 24 ranked North Carolina coached by Dean Smith and then defeating UMass coached by John Calipari to win the tournament. CSU went on to win the WAC regular season title in 1990, going back-to-back for the first time in school history. The Rams earned another No. 10 seed to the 1990 NCAA Tournament, led by WAC Player of the Year Mike Mitchell. The Rams fell in the first round to Alabama.

Grant retired following the 1991 season and during his four seasons as head coach, he compiled an 81–46 record (.638 winning percentage). He was inducted into the Colorado State Athletics Hall of Fame and the National Junior College Basketball Hall of Fame.

Stew Morrill took over as head coach following Grant's retirement after leading Montana to the 1991 NCAA Tournament. In his fourth season as head coach, the Rams made it to the WAC tournament semifinals before losing to Hawaii 66-64. The next season the Rams made the 1996 NIT before losing in the first round to Nebraska, the team that won the NIT championship that year. The Rams returned to the 1998 NIT, falling in the first round to Minnesota. Upon the season ending, Morrill left Colorado State to become the head coach at Utah State where he would go on to become to the winningest coach in the school's history during his 17 seasons.

Ritchie McKay would take over as Colorado State's head coach following Morrill leaving. He would guide the Rams to the 1999 NIT. The Rams would defeat Mississippi State in the first round and then defeat in-state rival Colorado in the second round. The team would then lose to California in the NIT quarterfinals. This marked Colorado State's final season competing in the WAC before moving to the Mountain West.

=== The Mountain West era (1999-2026) ===
Colorado State moved to the Mountain West Conference for the 1999–00 season after spending thirty seasons in the WAC. Colorado State was an inaugural member of the Mountain West. That season, Ritchie McKay coached his second and final season at CSU, finishing with a respectable 18-12 record (37-23 overall) before taking the head coaching job at Oregon State. On April 11, 2000, Dale Layer was hired to be the head coach for the Rams. He had been an assistant coach at CSU under McKay during the prior two seasons.

In surprising fashion, the Rams won the 2003 Mountain West tournament after a sixth place finish in the Mountain West regular season. The Rams defeated Border War rival Wyoming 74-71 in the quarterfinals and then defeated BYU 86-80 in the semifinals. On March 15th, 2003, CSU defeated UNLV 62-61 at the Thomas & Mack Center in Las Vegas to capture the 2003 Mountain West tournament championship. Junior center and leading scorer Matt Nelson won the tournament MVP award. The championship victory earned the Rams an automatic bid as a No. 14 seed to the 2003 NCAA tournament. This marked their first appearance in the NCAA Tournament in over a decade where they lost to Duke in the Round of 64, 57-67. After failing to reach the NCAA Tournament during the following four seasons, Layer was fired at the conclusion of the 2006-07 season with a year left on his contract. He finished his head coaching career at CSU with a 103–106 record (and 31–71 in conference play).

On March 22nd, 2007, Tim Miles was named Colorado State's head basketball coach in 2007 to rebuild the program. Miles inherited only two players from the previous season's roster during his first season as head coach, including losing Jason Smith who declared for the NBA draft, forgoing his final year of college eligibility and was drafted in the first round. The team struggled during his first two seasons, going 7-25 (0-16 in conference) and 9-22 (4-12 in conference). A turning point came during the 2010–11 season, when the Rams posted a 19-13 winning record and reestablished themselves as contenders in the conference. The Rams won the 2010 Cancún Governor's Cup played in Mexico where they defeated Appalachian State in the quarterfinals, Ole Miss in the semifinals, and Southern Miss in the tournament championship. The Rams finished conference play capturing fourth place in the Mountain West. The team earned a bid to the 2011 NIT, falling in the first round to Fairfield.

The following year during the 2011–12 season the Rams won 20 games for the first time in the 21st century, finishing the season with a 20-12 record. The team featured wins over ranked opponents such as San Diego State, New Mexico, and UNLV in a strong Mountain West conference that sent four teams to the NCAA Tournament. Included in these four teams was CSU, earning an at-large berth as a No. 11 seed, the program's first at-large bid since 1990. Although the Rams were eliminated by Murray State in the Round of 64, the appearance marked CSU's return to national relevance. Following the 2011–12 season, Miles left Colorado State to become the head coach at Nebraska.

Larry Eustachy was named head coach after Miles departed and immediately led Colorado State to an outstanding 2012–13 season. The Rams won the 2012 Las Vegas Classic with an 88-52 victory over Virginia Tech in the championship game. The team cracked the national top 25 for the first time since 1954 and set a program record for most wins, finishing with 26–9 record and earning another at-large bid to the NCAA Tournament. As a No. 8 seed, CSU defeated Missouri 84–72 in the Round of 64 of the NCAA Tournament, securing its first tournament win since 1989, before losing to top-seeded Louisville in the Round of 32.

The Rams had another historic season during the 2014–15 season. The team won the 2014 Great Alaska Shootout with a 65-63 victory over UC Santa Barbara at the Alaska Airlines Center in Anchorage. The Rams would again again crack the top 25 during the season and set another program record for wins, finishing with a 27–7 overall record. Despite the historic regular season, CSU controversially did not receive an NCAA Tournament bid that year. The Rams had an RPI of 30, becoming only the ninth team in the history of the NCAA Tournament to win 27 games and not make it in. CSU was also the first team since the tournament expanded to 68 teams in 2011 to be miss the tournament with at least an RPI of 30. CSU went onto play in the 2015 NIT, suffering a loss to South Dakota State in the first round.

On February 3, 2018, Colorado State placed Eustachy on administrative leave pending the completion of an inquiry into his behavior. He resigned from his position on February 26, 2018, bringing his tenure as head coach to an end.

Niko Medved was then named head coach of Colorado State on March 22, 2018. The 2020-21 season saw the Rams show great improvements. The Rams earned a bid to the 2021 NIT where they made it to semifinals, earning fourth place for their efforts with a young and upcoming team.

The 2021-22 season was a massive step forward as the Rams began the season winning the 2021 Paradise Jam in season tournament in November. In the championship game, after trailing Northeastern by 20 points early in the second half, the Rams put together a comeback and outscored the Huskies 47–17 in the final 17 minutes to win the game 71–61. NBA first-round pick David Roddy scored 27 points in the game and averaged 31 points per game in the tournament, winning MVP of the tournament. The Rams finished the regular season in second place in the Mountain West and made it back to the NCAA Tournament for the first time since 2013. The Rams earned a No. 6 seed in the tournament, but were defeated by Michigan in the Round of 64. The Rams finished with an overall record of 25-6. That season, CSU also finished ranked in the AP Top 25. The team was led by future NBA players David Roddy, Isaiah Stevens, and John Tonje.

The 2023–24 season marked another major step forward for the program. The Rams won the 2023 Hall of Fame Classic, upsetting No. 8 Creighton in the championship game. It was the Rams first win over a top 10 opponent since upsetting No. 5 UTEP in 1984. Senior point guard Isaiah Stevens, scored 20 points and was named MVP of the tournament. The Rams would go on to appear in the Top 25 in nine different polls, reaching No. 13 in early December, the highest ranking in school history. CSU would earn another spot in the NCAA Tournament, where the Rams defeated Virginia 67–42 in the First Four in Dayton before falling to Texas 56–44 in the Round of 64.

The 2024–25 season started slow with a 6–5 record in non-conference play before finishing Mountain West conference play on a seven-game winning streak, concluding the regular season with a 22–9 record and earning second place in the Mountain West regular season standings. The Rams, with their backs against the wall and unable to earn an at-large berth to the NCAA tournament convinceingly defeated Nevada in the quarterfinals 67-59 and then defeated Utah State 83-72 in the semifinals. The Rams winning streak would continue as they would then win the 2025 Mountain West Tournament championship led by tournament MVP and future NBA first-round pick Nique Clifford. The 69–56 victory over Boise State secured CSU's third NCAA Tournament berth under Medved. The Rams, as a No. 12 seed, would then defeat Memphis 78–70 in the NCAA Tournament's Round of 64, extending its winning streak to 11 games. However, the Rams’ season ended in the Round of 32 on a 72–71 buzzer-beating loss to Maryland.

Upon conclusion of the 2025 season, assistant coach Ali Farokhmanesh was named head coach of Colorado State after Medved left to take the head coaching job at Minnesota. Medved would leave the Rams with a 143-85 overall record as the head coach in seven seasons.

=== Pac-12 era (2026-present) ===
Colorado State left the Mountain West and joined the Pac-12 for the 2026–27 season where they began play in November 2026.

== Coaches ==
There have been 21 head coaches of the Colorado State Rams men's basketball team in their 123-season history. Colorado State's current head coach is Ali Farokhmanesh. He was hired as the Rams' head coach in March 2025, replacing Niko Medved who accepted a head coaching position at the University of Minnesota. Farokhmanesh spent seven seasons as an assistant and associate head coach under Medved before taking over as head coach. Medved departed CSU as the second-winningest coach in school history.

Head Coaching History
Coach	Tenure	Record	Pct.	Conference Titles	NCAA Tournament Appearances
No Coach	1901-1905	5-3	.625		
Claude Rothgeb	1905-1908^ 1909-1910	10–10	.500		
George Cassidy	1910-1911	5-4	.556		
Harry W. Hughes	1911-1925	60-79	.432		
Rudy Lavik	1925-1928	11-26	.297		
Joe Ryan	1928-1934	30-44	.405		
Saaly Salwachter	1934-1935	6-6	.500		
Sam Campbell	1935-1937	10-15	.400		
John S. Davis	1937-1943^ 1944-1945	42-80	.344		
E. D. Taylor	1945-1949	38-63	.376		
Bebe Lee	1949-1950	7-23	.233		
Bill Strannigan	1950-1954	60-56	.517	1 (Skyline)	1 (1954)
Jim Williams	1954-1980	352-293	.546	1 (Skyline)	4 (1963, 1965, 1966, 1969)
Tony McAndrews	1980-1987	80-120	.400		
Boyd Grant	1987-1991	81-46	.638	2 (WAC)	2 (1989, 1990)
Stew Morrill	1991-1998	121-86	.585		
Ritchie McKay	1998-2000	37-23	.617		
Dale Layer	2000-2007	103-106	.493	1 (Mountain West)	1 (2003)
Tim Miles	2007-2012	71-88	.447		1 (2012)
Larry Eustachy*	2012-2018	121-74	.621		1 (2013)
Steve Barnes*	2018	0-2	.000		
Jase Herl	2018	1-5	.167		
Niko Medved	2018-2025	143-85	.627	1 (Mountain West)	3 (2022, 2024, 2025)
Ali Farokhmanesh	2025-present	25-14	.641		

^ Colorado State did not field a basketball team for the 1908–09 season.
^ Colorado State did not field a basketball team for the 1943–44 season.
* Eustachy was suspended pending an investigation into his conduct as head coach. Barnes was named interim coach for the remainder of the season. Eustachy later resigned.
* Barnes was suspended as part of the investigation into the behavior of Colorado State's coaching staff. Herl was named interim coach for the remainder of the season.

== Players ==
=== Retired numbers ===
Colorado State Rams Retired Numbers
No.	Player	Career	No. Retired	Ref
14	John Mosley		2024	
24	Bill Green	1960-1963	1988	

* Mosley's number is retired across all CSU sports as of 2024.

== Awards and honors ==
=== All-Americans ===
Player	Year(s)	Team(s)
Bill Green	1963	Consensus Second Team – AP (3rd), USBWA (1st), NABC (1st)
Lonnie Wright	1965	AP (Honorable Mention)
Colton Iverson	2013	AP (Honorable Mention)
Gian Clavell	2017	AP (Honorable Mention)
David Roddy	2022	AP (Honorable Mention), USBWA (Honorable Mention)
Nique Clifford	2025	AP (Honorable Mention)

=== Conference honors ===
Mountain West Player of the Year

- Gian Clavell – 2017
- David Roddy – 2022

Mountain West Rookie of the Year

- Jason Smith – 2005
- Isaiah Stevens – 2020

Mountain West Sixth Man of the Year

- Pierce Hornung - 2011
- Daniel Bejarano - 2013
- John Gillon - 2015

Mountain West Newcomer of the Year

- Marcus Walker - 2008
- Colton Iverson - 2013

Mountain West Tournament MVP

- Matt Nelson - 2003
- Nique Clifford - 2025

Mountain West All-Conference First Team

- Jason Smith - 2006, 2007
- Andy Ogide - 2011
- Wes Eikmeier - 2012
- Colton Iverson - 2013
- J.J. Avila - 2015
- Gian Clavell - 2017
- Emmanuel Omogbo - 2017
- Nico Carvacho - 2019
- David Roddy - 2021, 2022
- Isaiah Stevens - 2023, 2024
- Nique Clifford - 2025

Mountain West All-Conference Second Team

- Ceedric Goodwyn - 2000
- Brian Greene - 2002
- Matt Nelson - 2005
- Marcus Walker - 2008
- Andy Ogide - 2010
- Dorian Green - 2013
- Daniel Bejarano - 2014, 2015
- Antwan Scott - 2016
- Nico Carvacho - 2020
- Isaiah Stevens - 2021, 2022

Mountain West All-Conference Third Team

- Matt Nelson - 2003, 2004
- Marcus Walker - 2009
- Dorian Green - 2012
- Pierce Hornung - 2012, 2013
- J.J. Avila - 2014
- Isaiah Stevens - 2020
- Nique Clifford - 2024
- Jevin Muniz - 2026

Mountain West All-Conference Defensive Team

- Pierce Hornung - 2012, 2013
- Gian Clavell - 2017
- Emmanuel Omogbo - 2017
- Nico Carvacho - 2019
- J.D. Paige - 2019
- Nique Clifford - 2025

WAC Player of the Year

- Mike Mitchell - 1990

WAC Rookie of the Year

- Joel Tribelhorn - 1989

WAC All-Conference First Team

- George Price - 1972
- Gary Rhoades - 1973
- Alan Cunningham - 1977
- Eddie Hughes - 1979
- Rich Strong - 1986
- Pat Durham - 1988, 1989
- Mike Mitchell - 1990
- Keith Bonds - 1993
- Ryan Yoder - 1994
- David Evans - 1996
- Milt Palacio - 1999

WAC All-Conference Second Team

- Cliff Shegogg - 1971
- Rick Fisher - 1971
- Mike Childress - 1971
- Gary Rhoades - 1972
- Tim Hall - 1974, 1975
- Barry Sabas - 1975
- Lorenzo Cash - 1976
- Barry Young - 1978
- Alan Cunningham - 1978
- Eddie Hughes - 1980
- Mark Steele - 1983
- Rich Strong - 1984, 1985
- Mike Gray - 1985
- Pat Durham - 1987
- Joel Tribelhorn - 1989
- Bryan Christiansen - 1997
- Jameel Mahmud - 1998

WAC All-Conference Defensive Team

- Bobby Sellers - 1994
- Delmonte Madison - 1996

== NBA ==
=== NBA Draft picks ===
Colorado State Draft Selections
Name	Round	Overall pick	Year	Team
Bill Green	1	8	1963	Boston Celtics
Jason Smith	1	20	2007	Miami Heat
David Roddy	1	23	2022	Philadelphia 76ers
Nique Clifford	1	24	2025	Oklahoma City Thunder
Bill Gossett	2	12	1951	Tri-Cities Blackhawks
Bob Rule	2	19	1967	Seattle SuperSonics
Rick Fisher	2	27	1971	Portland Trail Blazers
Pat Durham	2	35	1989	Dallas Mavericks
Joe Vogel	2	45	1996	Seattle SuperSonics
John Tonje	2	53	2025	Utah Jazz
Colton Iverson	2	53	2013	Indiana Pacers
Floyd Kerr	3	30	1969	Phoenix Suns
Lloyd Kerr	3	39	1969	Phoenix Suns
Glen Anderson	5	45	1951	Syracuse Nationals
Gary Rhoades	5	75	1973	Houston Rockets
Lonnie Wright	6	54	1966	St. Louis Hawks
Dale Schlueter	6	63	1967	San Francisco Warriors
Mike Childress	6	86	1971	Cleveland Cavaliers
Mark Steele	6	138	1983	Los Angeles Lakers
Sonny Bustion	7	75	1967	San Francisco Warriors
Cliff Shegogg	7	111	1970	Buffalo Braves
Eddie Hughes	7	140	1982	San Diego Clippers
Larry Paige	7	147	1978	Los Angeles Lakers
Alan Cunningham	8	169	1978	Philadelphia 76ers
Barry Young	9	185	1980	New Jersey Nets
Mike Davis	12	162	1969	Cincinnati Royals

=== Rams in the NBA ===
15 former Colorado State players have appeared in the National Basketball Association or American Basketball Association:

- John O'Boyle
- Lonnie Wright
- Bob Rule
- Dale Schlueter
- Rick Fisher
- Eddie Hughes
- Pat Durham
- Milt Palacio
- Jason Smith
- Stanton Kidd
- Gian Clavell
- David Roddy
- Isaiah Stevens
- Nique Clifford
- John Tonje

== Rams in overseas leagues ==
- Nico Carvacho (born 1997) – power forward/center in the Israeli Basketball Premier League

== Postseason results ==
=== NCAA tournament results ===
The Rams have appeared in 13 NCAA Tournaments, with a combined record of 6–14.

Year	Seed	Round	Opponent	Result
1954		Sweet Sixteen; Regional 3rd Place	Santa Clara; Idaho State	L 50–73; L 57–62
1963		Round of 25	Oklahoma City	L 67–70
1965		Round of 23	Oklahoma City	L 68–70
1966		Round of 22	Houston	L 76–82
1969		Round of 25; Sweet Sixteen; Elite Eight	Dayton; Colorado; Drake	W 52–50; W 64–56; L 77–84
1989	#10	Round of 64; Round of 32	#7 Florida #2 Syracuse	W 68–46; L 50–65
1990	#10	Round of 64	#7 Alabama	L 54–71
2003	#14	Round of 64	#3 Duke	L 57–67
2012	#11	Round of 64	#6 Murray State	L 41–58
2013	#8	Round of 64; Round of 32	#9 Missouri #1 Louisville	W 84–72; L 56–82
2022	#6	Round of 64	#11 Michigan	L 63–75
2024	#10	First Four; Round of 64	#10 Virginia #7 Texas	W 67–42; L 44–56
2025	#12	Round of 64; Round of 32	#5 Memphis #4 Maryland	W 78–70; L 71–72

=== NIT results ===
The Rams have appeared in 11 National Invitation Tournaments (NIT), with a combined record of 9–12.

Year	Round	Opponent	Result
1961	Quarterfinals	Saint Louis	L 53–59
1962	First Round	Holy Cross	L 71–72
1988	First Round; Second Round; Quarterfinals; Semifinals; 3rd Place Game	New Orleans; Houston; Arkansas State; Ohio State; Boston College	W 63–54; W 71–61; W 69–49; L 62–64; W 58–57
1996	First Round	Nebraska	L 83–91
1998	First Round	Minnesota	L 65–77
1999	First Round; Second Round; Quarterfinals	Mississippi State; Colorado; California	W 69–56; W 86–76; L 62–71
2011	First Round	Fairfield	L 60–62
2015	First Round	South Dakota State	L 76–86
2017	First Round; Second Round	Charleston; Cal State Bakersfield	W 81–74; L 63–81
2021	First Round; Quarterfinals; Semifinals; 3rd Place Game	Buffalo; NC State; Memphis; Louisiana Tech	W 75–73; W 65–61; L 67–90; L 74–76
2026	First Round	Saint Joesph's	L 69–64

=== CBI results ===
The Rams have appeared in one College Basketball Invitational (CBI) and lost the opener.

Year	Round	Opponent	Result
2010	First Round	Morehead State	L 60–74

== Notable games ==
- March 13, 1969, in the "Sweet 16" round of the NCAA tournament: Colorado State beat in-state rival and AP #18 Colorado 64–56.
- January 19, 1984, at Moby Arena: Colorado State beat AP #5 UTEP 63–51 to give the Miners their first loss of the season.
- December 29, 1989, at McNichols Sports Arena: Colorado State beat AP #24 North Carolina 78–67 in the Mile High Classic, a four-team tournament in Denver also featuring Colorado and Massachusetts. Colorado State beat Massachusetts the next night to win the tournament.
- December 22, 1999, at the Cannon Activities Center at Laie, Hawaii: In a Pearl Harbor Classic tournament game, Colorado State upset AP #18 UCLA 55–54. John Ford made a free throw with 23 seconds left that turned out to be the winning margin.
- December 30, 2003, at Moby Arena: Colorado State hosted AP #22 Purdue. Down 4 points with 7 seconds left, Colorado State committed a foul. In the double bonus, Purdue missed both free throws. CSU scored a three pointer with 0.7 seconds left. The ensuing Purdue inbound pass was tipped; the ball fell into the hands of Michael Morris who shot the game winning three pointer at the buzzer. The game was not televised. CSU was awarded the points and won the game by two points.
- March 21, 2013, in the "Round of 64" of the NCAA tournament: Colorado State beat #9 seed Missouri 84–72 to advance to the Round of 32.
- January 2, 2021, at Viejas Arena: Colorado State came back from a 26-point deficit to beat San Diego State 70–67, the largest comeback in Mountain West history.
- November 22, 2021, at Sports and Fitness Center: After trailing Northeastern by 20 points early in the second half of the 2021 Paradise Jam tournament championship game, the Rams put together a comeback and outscored the Huskies 47–17 in the final 17 minutes to win the game — and the tournament — 71–61. David Roddy, who scored 27 points — and averaged 31 points a game — was named the MVP of the tournament.
- November 23, 2023, at T-Mobile Center: Colorado State upset AP #8 Creighton 69–48 in the Hall of Fame Classic championship game. It was the Rams first win over a top 10 opponent since upsetting AP #5 UTEP in 1984. Isaiah Stevens, who scored 20 points, seven rebounds, and six assists – was named MVP of the tournament.
- March 15, 2025, at the Thomas & Mack Center: Colorado State won its first Mountain West Conference title since 2003 69-56 over Boise State. Slated to finish No. 7 in the conference at the beginning of the season, CSU ended up sweeping three of the six teams seated above it throughout the season (Boise State, Nevada and UNLV). Nique Clifford — the MVP of the tournament — scored 24 points in the championship game.
- March 21, 2025, in the "Round of 64" of the NCAA tournament: Colorado State beat #5 seed Memphis 78–70 to advance to the Round of 32.

== Rivalries ==
- Air Force: Colorado State has an in-state rivalry with the Falcons of the United States Air Force Academy in Colorado Springs. As of the 2025–26 season, Colorado State leads the series 93–34.
- Colorado: This in-state rivalry known as the Rocky Mountain Showdown pits Colorado State against Colorado, a member of the Big 12 Conference. As of the 2025-26 season, Colorado leads the series 90–41.
- Wyoming: In a rivalry dubbed the "Border War", the Cowboys of the University of Wyoming have a 139–104 series lead over Colorado State as of the 2025–26 season.

== Moby Arena ==
The Colorado State men's basketball team plays at Moby Arena, an 8,083-seat arena located on the central campus of Colorado State University in Fort Collins, Colorado. The arena was built to replace South College Gymnasium, which was built in 1926 and seated 1,500 people. The arena was opened on January 24, 1966. Moby also serves as home to the Colorado State women's basketball team as well as Colorado State's volleyball team. Know locally as 'Moby Madness,' for more than sixty years, Moby has included one of the most effective home courts in the nation. At the conclusion of the 2025-26 season, the Rams have a 636-259 record (.711) while playing at Moby Arena.
