= Tim Miles =

American basketball coach (born 1966)

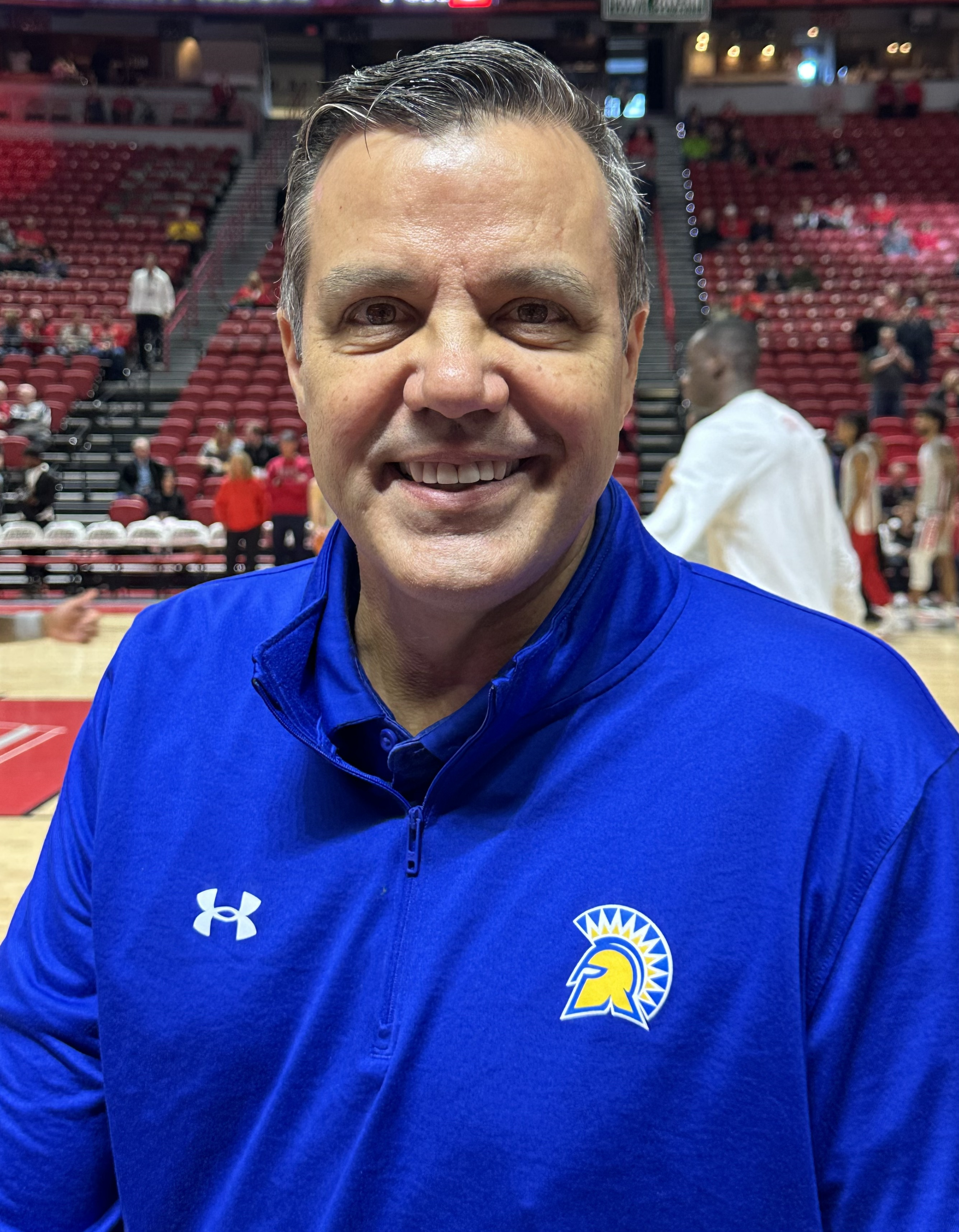
- Miles in 2025

Current position
- Title: Head coach
- Team: San Jose State
- Conference: Mountain West
- Record: 62–104 (.373)

Biographical details
- Born: August 20, 1966 (age 60); Doland, South Dakota, U.S.

Playing career
- 1985–1989: Mary

Coaching career (HC unless noted)
- 1989–1995: Northern State (assistant)
- 1995–1997: Mayville State
- 1997–2001: Southwest Minnesota State
- 2001–2007: North Dakota State
- 2007–2012: Colorado State
- 2012–2019: Nebraska
- 2021–present: San Jose State

Head coaching record
- Overall: 461–438 (.513)
- Tournaments: 0–2 (NCAA Division I); 3–1 (NCAA Division II); 0–2 (NAIA Division II); 1–4 (NIT); 1–2 (CBI)

Accomplishments and honors

Championships
- 2 NDCAC (1996, 1997); NSIC (2001)

Awards
- Jim Phelan Award (2014); MWC Coach of the Year (2023); Big Ten Coach of the Year (2014); NSIC Coach of the Year (2001); NDCAC Coach of the Year (1996)

Timothy Sean Miles (born August 20, 1966) is an American college basketball coach who is the current head coach of the San Jose State Spartans men's basketball team. Miles previously served as the head coach of North Dakota State University, Colorado State University and the University of Nebraska–Lincoln. Miles is a graduate of the University of Mary.

== Coaching career ==
=== Early career ===
Following his playing career at the University of Mary, Miles spent five seasons as an assistant coach at Northern State University, where the Wolves went to four NAIA II national tournaments and two national championship games. In 1995, Miles left to accept his first head coaching job at NAIA II Mayville State. In both his seasons at Mayville State, Miles led the Comets to NDCAC Championships and the NAIA II National Tournament. In 1997, he accepted the Southwest Minnesota State job and led the Mustangs to four straight winning seasons including a historic season in 2001. Leading Southwest State to their first NSIC championship and NCAA II regional berth. Southwest State won the North Central Region Championship and advanced to the NCAA II Elite Eight in Bakersfield, CA.

Miles took over at North Dakota State in the spring of 2001. Shortly thereafter, the school declared its intent to reclassify from NCAA II to transition to NCAA I. The school would be ineligible for postseason play in its first five years of the transition, and was initially without a conference. On January 21, 2006, in just the school's second year in Division I, NDSU pulled off a shocking 62–55 upset of No. 12 Wisconsin at the Kohl Center. The Bison, starting three freshmen, ended Wisconsin's 27-game home winning streak against non-conference opponents. Miles would be named the Division I Independent Coach of the Year by CBS Sportsline.

The following season the Bison pulled off another stunning upset, upsetting No. 8 Marquette in the championship game of the Blue and Gold Classic. The Bison finished 20–8, their best season under Miles. North Dakota State joined the Summit League the year after Miles departed and the Bison made the NCAA Tournament under the guidance of new head coach Saul Phillips, who was previously Miles' assistant.

=== Colorado State ===
On March 22, 2007, Miles was named head coach at Colorado State, replacing Dale Layer. Miles inherited just two players from the 2007 roster, and as a result the program struggled immensely. After going winless in conference play in his first season, Miles' teams gradually improved over the following years.

In May 2011, after winning 19 games and guiding CSU to its seventh NIT appearance, he signed a 5-year contract extension with Colorado State.

The following season, the Rams defeated three ranked teams, all at home at Moby Arena. On January 28, CSU upset No. 13 San Diego State for the program's first win over a ranked opponent since 2004. Just over a month later, the Rams stunned No. 18 New Mexico. Then, on February 29, Colorado State rallied from a 15-point deficit at halftime to defeat No. 17 UNLV 66-59. CSU finished 20–11 overall and 8–6 in the Mountain West, and was awarded an at-large bid to the NCAA Tournament. It was CSU's first trip to the tournament since 2003 and their first at-large bid since 1990. The Rams were the No. 11 seed in the West Regional and fell to No. 6 seed Murray State.

=== Nebraska ===
On March 24, 2012 Miles was named head coach at Nebraska, replacing Doc Sadler. Historically, the Cornhuskers have fielded one of the weakest high-major college programs in Division I, making the NCAA Tournament only six times before Miles' arrival and losing in the first round all six times. In 2014, Miles' second season, he coached the Huskers to the NCAA tournament, the school's first tournament berth since 1998, but the Cornhuskers lost to Baylor in the first round. After three seasons of single-digit conference wins, Miles guided the team to a 22–11 record in the 2017–18 season, achieving a program record 13 conference wins before falling in the first round of the NIT. In 2018-19, Miles led Nebraska to a 10-2 start and another Top 25 ranking, before several injuries derailed Nebraska's NCAA tournament hopes. The Huskers made the quarterfinals of the Big Ten tournament but lost to Wisconsin 66-62. The Huskers made the Big Ten quarter-finals five of seven years under Miles. The NIT came calling again and the Huskers beat Butler, but lost at TCU to end their season at 19-17. The Huskers ranked 10th nationally in single-season attendance, averaging 15,341 fans per game, as Nebraska was one of nine programs nationally to average at least 15,000 fans in each of the past six seasons.

Miles was relieved of his duties on March 26, 2019, finishing as the coach with the third-most wins in Nebraska men's basketball history. Nebraska athletic director Bill Moos stated that “Ultimately, we have not maintained a level of consistent success and stability on the court, and after a full review I have made the decision to move in another direction for the leadership of our program.”

=== San Jose State ===
On April 6, 2021, Miles was hired as the head men's basketball coach at San Jose State University. On November 11, 2021, Miles got his 400th career win against Cal State Fullerton.

== Broadcasting ==
During his time away from coaching, Miles served as an analyst for the Big Ten Network, Fox Sports, and FS1.

== Head coaching record ==
Record table
Season	Team	Overall	Conference	Standing	Postseason
Mayville State Comets (North Dakota College Athletic Conference) (1995–1997)
1995–96	Mayville State	17–11	9–3	1st	NAIA Division II First Round
1996–97	Mayville State	18–11	10–2	1st	NAIA Division II First Round
Mayville State NAIA:		35–22 (.614)	19–5 (.792)		
Southwest Minnesota State Mustangs (Northern Sun Intercollegiate Conference) (1997–2001)
1997–98	Southwest Minnesota State	16–11	7–5	3rd	
1998–99	Southwest Minnesota State	16–11	7–5	3rd	
1999–2000	Southwest Minnesota State	18–10	12–6	4th	
2000–01	Southwest Minnesota State	28–7	17–1	1st	NCAA Division II Elite Eight
Southwest Minnesota State:		78–39 (.667)	43–17 (.717)		
North Dakota State Bison (North Central Conference) (2001–2004)
2001–02	North Dakota State	11–15	5–13	8th	
2002–03	North Dakota State	20–11	9–7	4th	
2003–04	North Dakota State	16–13	8–6	3rd	
North Dakota State Bison (NCAA Division I independent) (2004–2007)
2004–05	North Dakota State	16–12			
2005–06	North Dakota State	16–12			
2006–07	North Dakota State	20–8			
North Dakota State:		99–71 (.582)	22–26 (.458)		
Colorado State Rams (Mountain West Conference) (2007–2012)
2007–08	Colorado State	7–25	0–16	9th	
2008–09	Colorado State	9–22	4–12	8th	
2009–10	Colorado State	16–16	7–9	5th	CBI First Round
2010–11	Colorado State	19–13	9–7	4th	NIT First Round
2011–12	Colorado State	20–12	8–6	4th	NCAA Division I Round of 64
Colorado State:		71–88 (.447)	28–50 (.359)		
Nebraska Cornhuskers (Big Ten Conference) (2012–2019)
2012–13	Nebraska	15–18	5–13	10th	
2013–14	Nebraska	19–13	11–7	4th	NCAA Division I Round of 64
2014–15	Nebraska	13–18	5–13	12th	
2015–16	Nebraska	16–18	6–12	11th	
2016–17	Nebraska	12–19	6–12	T–12th	
2017–18	Nebraska	22–11	13–5	T–4th	NIT First Round
2018–19	Nebraska	19–17	6–14	13th	NIT Second Round
Nebraska:		116–114 (.504)	52–76 (.406)		
San Jose State Spartans (Mountain West Conference) (2021–present)
2021–22	San Jose State	8–23	1–17	11th	
2022–23	San Jose State	21–14	10–8	5th	CBI Quarterfinals
2023–24	San Jose State	9–23	2–16	T–10th	
2024–25	San Jose State	15–20	7–13	8th	NIT First Round
2025–26	San Jose State	9–24	3–17	11th	
2026–27	San Jose State	0–0	0–0		
San Jose State:		62–104 (.373)	22–71 (.237)		
Total:		461–438 (.513)			
National champion Postseason invitational champion Conference regular season champion Conference regular season and conference tournament champion Division regular season champion Division regular season and conference tournament champion Conference tournament champion
