= 2011–12 Colorado State Rams men's basketball team =

American college basketball season

2011–12 Colorado State Rams men's basketball
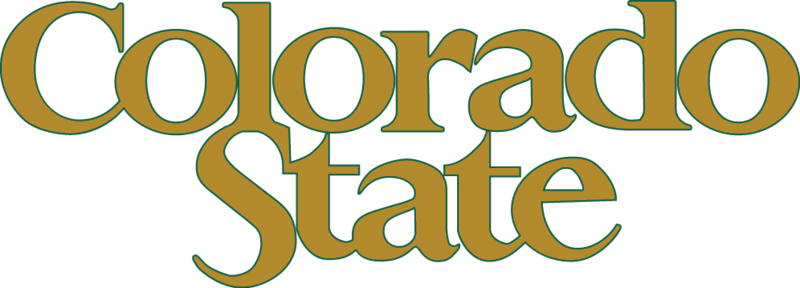

Sun Bowl Invitational Champions

NCAA Tournament, second round
- Conference: Mountain West Conference
- Record: 20–12 (8–6 Mountain West)
- Head coach: Tim Miles (5th season)
- Assistant coaches: Niko Medved; Craig Smith; Ronald Coleman
- Home arena: Moby Arena

2011–12 Mountain West Conference men's basketball standings
	Conf.				Overall
Team	W		L	PCT	W		L	PCT
No. 21 New Mexico †	10	–	4	.714	28	–	7	.800
No. 22 San Diego St	10	–	4	.714	26	–	8	.765
No. 23 UNLV	9	–	5	.643	26	–	9	.743
Colorado State	8	–	6	.571	20	–	12	.625
TCU	7	–	7	.500	18	–	15	.545
Wyoming	6	–	8	.429	21	–	12	.636
Air Force	3	–	11	.214	13	–	16	.448
Boise State	3	–	11	.214	13	–	17	.433
† 2012 MWC tournament winner As of March 8, 2012; Rankings from AP Poll

The 2011–12 Colorado State Rams men's basketball team represented Colorado State University during the 2011–12 NCAA Division I men's basketball season. The team was coached by Tim Miles in his 5th season. They played their home games at the Moby Arena on Colorado State University's main campus in Fort Collins, Colorado and are a member of the Mountain West Conference. They finished the season 20–12, 8–6 in Mountain West play to finish in fourth place. They lost in the semifinals of the Mountain West Basketball tournament to San Diego State. They received an at-large bid to the 2012 NCAA basketball tournament where they lost in the second round to Murray State.

== Departures ==
The Colorado State Rams lost senior power forward Andy Ogide who was averaging 17.2 ppg, senior Small Forward Travis Franklin who was averaging 11.8 ppg, Adam Nigon and Andre McFarland.

== Roster ==
#	Name	Height	Weight (lbs.)	Position	Class	Hometown	Previous School
0	Cody Mann	6'0"	160	G	Fr.	Miami, FL	Dr. Krop HS
2	Daniel Bejarano	6'4"	202	G	So.	Phoenix, AZ	Arizona
3	Trevor Williams	7'0"	282	C	RS So.	Denver, CO	Denver Lutheran HS
4	Pierce Hornung	6'5"	210	F	Jr.	Arvada, CO	Ralston Valley HS
10	Wes Eikmeier	6'3"	168	G	RS Jr.	Fremont, NE	Iowa State
11	Jesse Carr	6'2"	184	G	RS Jr.	Ainsworth, NE	Ainsworth HS
15	Kaipo Sabas	5'11"	177	G	Sr.	Fort Collins, CO	Laramie County CC
22	Dorian Green	6'2"	192	G	Jr.	Lawrence, KS	Lawrence HS
23	Will Bell	6'6"	242	F	Sr.	Colorado Springs, CO	Northeastern JC
25	Chad Calcaterra	6'10"	228	C	RS Fr.	Cloquet, MN	Cloquet HS
33	Dwight Smith	6'4"	185	G	So.	Omaha, NE	Ralston HS
44	Greg Smith	6'6"	221	F	Jr.	Omaha, NE	Ralston HS
45	Colton Iverson	6'10"	261	F/C	Sr.	Yankton, SD	Minnesota

== Schedule and results ==
Date time, TV	Rank^{#}	Opponent^{#}	Result	Record	Site (attendance) city, state
Exhibition
11/01/2011*; 7:00 pm		CSU–Pueblo	W 97–82	–	Moby Arena (2,241); Fort Collins, CO
11/05/2011*; 2:00 pm		SW Minnesota State	W 83–70	–	Moby Arena (2,250); Fort Collins, CO
Regular season
11/11/2011*; 7:00 pm		Montana	W 64–58	1–0	Moby Arena (4,666); Fort Collins, CO
11/14/2011*; 6:00 pm, ESPNU		vs. SMU; NIT Season Tip-Off First Round	W 75–56	2–0	Maples Pavilion (177); Palo Alto, CA
11/16/2011*; 9:00 pm, ESPNU		at Stanford; NIT Season Tip-Off Quarterfinals	L 52–64	2–1	Maples Pavilion (4,337); Palo Alto, CA
11/19/2011*; 7:00 pm		Southern Miss	L 58–79	2–2	Moby Arena (2,275); Fort Collins, CO
11/21/2011*; 7:30 pm		UTSA; NIT Season Tip-Off Consolation game	W 85–75	3–2	Moby Arena (759); Fort Collins, CO
11/22/2011*; 7:30 pm		Manhattan; NIT Season Tip-Off Consolation game	W 91–86 ^{OT}	4–2	Moby Arena (890); Fort Collins, CO
11/30/2011*; 6:00 pm, The Mtn.		Colorado	W 65–64	5–2	Moby Arena (6,481); Fort Collins, CO
12/03/2011*; 12:30 pm		at Northern Iowa; MWC–MVC Challenge	L 77–83	5–3	McLeod Center (4,015); Cedar Falls, IA
12/07/2011*; 5:00 pm, ESPN2		at No. 7 Duke	L 64–87	5–4	Cameron Indoor Stadium (9,314); Durham, NC
12/19/2011*; 7:00 pm		Texas Southern	W 85–61	6–4	Moby Arena (2,585); Fort Collins, CO
12/22/2011*; 7:00 pm		at Northern Colorado	W 92–78	7–4	Butler–Hancock Sports Pavilion (2,148); Greeley, CO
12/28/2011*; 7:00 pm		at UTEP; Sun Bowl Invitational Semifinals	W 56–53	8–4	Don Haskins Center (8,534); El Paso, TX
12/29/2011*; 7:30 pm		vs. Jacksonville State; Sun Bowl Invitational Championship	W 79–56	9–4	Don Haskins Center (6,753); El Paso, TX
01/07/2012*; 7:00 pm		Nebraska-Omaha	W 87–63	10–4	Moby Arena (3,000); Fort Collins, CO
01/11/2012*; 7:00 pm, The Mtn.		Denver	W 79–75	11–4	Moby Arena (2,946); Fort Collins, CO
01/14/2012; 7:00 pm, The Mtn.		TCU	W 95–89 ^{2OT}	12–4 (1–0)	Moby Arena (2,577); Fort Collins, CO
01/17/2012; 8:00 pm, The Mtn.		Boise State	W 66–55	13–4 (2–0)	Moby Arena (4,753); Fort Collins, CO
01/21/2012; 4:00 pm, The Mtn.		at Wyoming	L 51–70	13–5 (2–1)	Arena-Auditorium (7,901); Laramie, WY
01/25/2012; 8:00 pm, CBSSN		at New Mexico	L 52–85	13–6 (2–2)	The Pit (14,089); Albuquerque, NM
01/28/2012; 2:00 pm, NBCSN		No. 13 San Diego State	W 77–60	14–6 (3–2)	Moby Arena (6,038); Fort Collins, CO
02/01/2012; 8:30 pm, The Mtn.		at No. 11 UNLV	L 63–82	14–7 (3–3)	Thomas & Mack Center (15,053); Paradise, NV
02/04/2012; 3:00 pm, CBSSN		Air Force	W 67–49	15–7 (4–3)	Moby Arena (4,359); Fort Collins, CO
02/11/2012; 6:30 pm, The Mtn.		at TCU	L 71–75	15–8 (4–4)	Daniel–Meyer Coliseum (4,822); Fort Worth, TX
02/15/2012; 8:00 pm, The Mtn.		at Boise State	L 69–70	15–9 (4–5)	Taco Bell Arena (3,312); Idaho, ID
02/18/2012; 7:00 pm, The Mtn.		Wyoming	W 54–46	16–9 (5–5)	Moby Arena (8,745); Fort Collins, CO
02/21/2012; 8:00 pm, The Mtn.		No. 18 New Mexico	W 71–63	17–9 (6–5)	Moby Arena (4,444); Fort Collins, CO
02/25/2012; 8:00 pm, The Mtn.		at No. 24 San Diego State	L 66–74	17–10 (6–6)	Viejas Arena (12,414); San Diego, CA
02/29/2012; 8:00 pm, CBSSN		No. 17 UNLV	W 66–59	18–10 (7–6)	Moby Arena (8,371); Fort Collins, CO
03/03/2012; 2:00 pm, The Mtn.		at Air Force	W 75–65	19–10 (8–6)	Clune Arena (4,858); Colorado Springs, CO
2012 Mountain West Conference men's basketball tournament
03/08/2012; 3:30 pm, The Mtn.		vs. TCU; Quarterfinals	W 81–60	20–10	Thomas & Mack Center (8,601); Las Vegas, NV
03/09/2012; 7:00 pm, CBSSN		vs. No. 18 San Diego State; Semifinals	L 69–79	20–11	Thomas & Mack Center (16,339); Las Vegas, NV
2012 NCAA tournament
03/15/2012*; 10:15 am, CBS	(11 W)	vs. (6 W) No. 12 Murray State; Second Round	L 41–58	20–12	KFC Yum! Center (16,069); Louisville, KY
*Non-conference game. ^{#}Rankings from AP Poll. (#) Tournament seedings in parentheses. All times are in Mountain Time (#) during NCAA Tournament is seed with Region.

== See also ==
- 2011–12 NCAA Division I men's basketball season
- 2011–12 NCAA Division I men's basketball rankings
