= 2011–12 TCU Horned Frogs men's basketball team =

American college basketball season

2011–12 TCU Horned Frogs men's basketball

CBI, Quarterfinals
- Conference: Mountain West Conference
- Record: 18–15 (7–7 Mountain West)
- Head coach: Jim Christian
- Assistant coaches: Bill Wuczynski; Reggie Brown; Rob Evans
- Home arena: Daniel–Meyer Coliseum

2011–12 Mountain West Conference men's basketball standings
	Conf.				Overall
Team	W		L	PCT	W		L	PCT
No. 21 New Mexico †	10	–	4	.714	28	–	7	.800
No. 22 San Diego St	10	–	4	.714	26	–	8	.765
No. 23 UNLV	9	–	5	.643	26	–	9	.743
Colorado State	8	–	6	.571	20	–	12	.625
TCU	7	–	7	.500	18	–	15	.545
Wyoming	6	–	8	.429	21	–	12	.636
Air Force	3	–	11	.214	13	–	16	.448
Boise State	3	–	11	.214	13	–	17	.433
† 2012 MWC tournament winner As of March 8, 2012; Rankings from AP Poll

The 2011–12 TCU Horned Frogs basketball team represented Texas Christian University. The team was coached by Jim Christian. They played their home games at Daniel–Meyer Coliseum in Fort Worth, Texas and were a member of the Mountain West Conference. They finished the season 18–15, 7–7 in Mountain West play to finish in fifth place. They lost in the quarterfinals of the Mountain West Basketball tournament to Colorado State. They were invited to the 2012 College Basketball Invitational, where they defeated Milwaukee in the first round before falling in the quarterfinals to Oregon State.

This was TCU's last season in Mountain West Conference, as they would depart for the Big 12 Conference beginning in the 2012–2013 season.

== Roster ==
#	Name	Height	Weight (lbs.)	Position	Class	Hometown	Previous school
1	Jarvis Ray	6'6"	195	G	So.	New Orleans, LA	O. Perry Walker HS
2	Connell Crossland	6'7"	190	F	Jr.	St. Louis, MO	Hazelwood Central HS/John A. Logan College
4	Amric Fields	6'9"	210	F	Fr.	Oklahoma City, OK	Putnam West HS
5	Kyan Anderson	5'11"	175	G	Fr.	Fort Worth, TX	North Crowley HS
10	Hank Thorns	5'9"	165	G	Sr.	Las Vegas, NV	Las Vegas Valley HS/Virginia Tech
11	Thomas Montigel	6'2"	190	G	So.	Fort Worth, TX	Paschal HS
13	Cheick Kone	6'10"	235	C	Jr.	Bamako, MAL	Cornerstone Christian School/Howard College
21	Nate Butler	6'6"	200	G	Jr.	Dorado, PR	M.E.C.A./John A. Logan College
23	J. R. Cadot	6'5"	205	G	Sr.	Nassau, BAH	C.V. Bethel Senior HS/Sheridan College
24	Adrick McKinney	6'8"	250	F	Jr.	Fort Worth, TX	Trimble Tech HS/Angelina College
31	Marin Bavcevic	6'0"	185	G	Sr.	Split, CRO	The Patterson School
33	Garlon Green	6'7"	210	F	Jr.	Missouri City, TX	Hightower HS
41	Craig Williams	6'8"	240	F	Sr.	Christiansted, USVI	Central HS/Temple

== Schedule and results ==
Date time, TV	Rank^{#}	Opponent^{#}	Result	Record	Site (attendance) city, state
Exhibition
11/05/2011*; 7:00 pm		Cameron	W 68–46	–	Daniel–Meyer Coliseum (N/A); Fort Worth, TX
Regular season
11/11/2011*; 7:00 pm		Florida Gulf Coast	W 73–72	1–0	Daniel–Meyer Coliseum (4,158); Fort Worth, TX
11/14/2011*; 8:00 pm		Austin	W 103–45	2–0	Daniel–Meyer Coliseum (4,068); Fort Worth, TX
11/18/2011*; 5:00 pm		vs. Virginia; Paradise Jam tournament quarterfinals	W 57–55	3–0	Sports and Fitness Center (N/A); St. Thomas, VI
11/20/2011*; 5:00 pm, FSN		vs. Norfolk State; Paradise Jam Tournament semifinals	L 53–66	3–1	Sports and Fitness Center (N/A); St. Thomas, VI
11/21/2011*; 5:00 pm, FSN		vs. Mississippi; Paradise Jam Tournament 3rd place	L 69–80	3–2	Sports and Fitness Center (N/A); St. Thomas, VI
11/26/2011*; 7:00 pm		at Houston	W 81–80	4–2	Hofheinz Pavilion (3,357); Houston, TX
11/30/2011*; 7:00 pm		Lamar	W 77–72	5–2	Daniel–Meyer Coliseum (4,263); Fort Worth, TX
12/03/2011*; 7:05 pm		at Evansville; MWC–MVC Challenge	W 70–68 ^{OT}	6–2	Ford Center (5,198); Evansville, IN
12/06/2011*; 6:00 pm, CBSSN		Texas Tech	W 75–69	7–2	Daniel–Meyer Coliseum (6,290); Fort Worth, TX
12/10/2011*; 7:00 pm, The Mtn.		Nebraska	L 57–69	7–3	Daniel–Meyer Coliseum (5,577); Fort Worth, TX
12/19/2011*; 9:30 pm		at USC	L 59–83	7–4	Galen Center (3,208); Los Angeles, CA
12/22/2011*; 7:00 pm, The Mtn.		Grambling State	W 85–53	8–4	Daniel–Meyer Coliseum (4,169); Fort Worth, TX
12/31/2011*; 6:00 pm, CBSSN		Tulsa	L 66–74	8–5	Daniel–Meyer Coliseum (4,201); Fort Worth, TX
01/04/2012*; 7:00 pm, The Mtn.		Rice	W 78–74	9–5	Daniel–Meyer Coliseum (3,972); Fort Worth, TX
01/11/2012*; 7:00 pm		Texas-Pan American	W 88–58	10–5	Daniel–Meyer Coliseum (3,882); Fort Worth, TX
01/14/2012; 8:00 pm, The Mtn.		at Colorado State	L 89–95 ^{2OT}	10–6 (0–1)	Moby Arena (2,577); Fort Collins, CO
01/18/2012; 9:30 pm, The Mtn.		at No. 14 UNLV	L 78–101	10–7 (0–2)	Thomas & Mack Center (14,126); Paradise, NV
01/21/2012; 2:30 pm, The Mtn.		Boise State	W 54–52	11–7 (1–2)	Daniel–Meyer Coliseum (4,995); Fort Worth, TX
01/25/2012; 6:30 pm, The Mtn.		Air Force	W 59–56	12–7 (2–2)	Daniel–Meyer Coliseum (4,570); Fort Worth, TX
01/28/2012; 5:00 pm, The Mtn.		at New Mexico	L 54–71	12–8 (2–3)	The Pit (15,212); Albuquerque, NM
02/01/2012; 7:00 pm, The Mtn.		Wyoming	W 58–52	13–8 (3–3)	Daniel–Meyer Coliseum (4,720); Fort Worth, TX
02/04/2012; 9:00 pm, The Mtn.		at No. 17 San Diego State	L 73–83	13–9 (3–4)	Viejas Arena (12,414); San Diego, CA
02/08/2012*; 7:00 pm		at SMU	L 62–68	13–10	Moody Coliseum (3,508); Dallas, TX
02/11/2012; 7:30 pm, The Mtn.		Colorado State	W 75–71	14–10 (4–4)	Daniel–Meyer Coliseum (4,822); Fort Worth, TX
02/14/2012; 6:30 pm, The Mtn.		No. 11 UNLV	W 102–97 ^{OT}	15–10 (5–4)	Daniel-Meyer Coliseum (4,710); Fort Worth, TX
02/18/2012; 3:00 pm, The Mtn.		at Boise State	L 64–65	15–11 (5–5)	Taco Bell Arena (6,785); Boise, ID
02/22/2012; 7:00 pm, The Mtn.		at Air Force	W 65–62	16–11 (6–5)	Clune Arena (2,476); Colorado Springs, CO
02/25/2012; 6:00 pm, The Mtn.		No. 18 New Mexico	W 83–64	17–11 (7–5)	Daniel–Meyer Coliseum (6,460); Fort Worth, TX
02/28/2012; 8:30 pm, The Mtn.		at Wyoming	L 59–71	17–12 (7–6)	Arena-Auditorium (5,174); Laramie, WY
03/03/2012; 6:00 pm, The Mtn.		No. 21 San Diego State	L 92–98 ^{OT}	17–13 (7–7)	Daniel–Meyer Coliseum (5,955); Fort Worth, TX
2012 Mountain West Conference men's basketball tournament
03/08/2012; 4:30 pm, The Mtn.		vs. Colorado State; Quarterfinals	L 60–81	17–14	Thomas & Mack Center (8,601); Las Vegas, NV
2012 CBI
03/13/2012*; 7:00 pm		Milwaukee; First Round	W 83–73	18–14	Daniel–Meyer Coliseum (1,062); Fort Worth, TX
03/19/2012*; 9:00 pm, HDNet		at Oregon State; Quarterfinals	L 81–101	18–15	Gill Coliseum (2,315); Corvallis, OR
*Non-conference game. ^{#}Rankings from AP Poll. (#) Tournament seedings in parentheses. All times are in Central Time.
