= Emmanuel Omogbo =

Nigerian-American basketball player

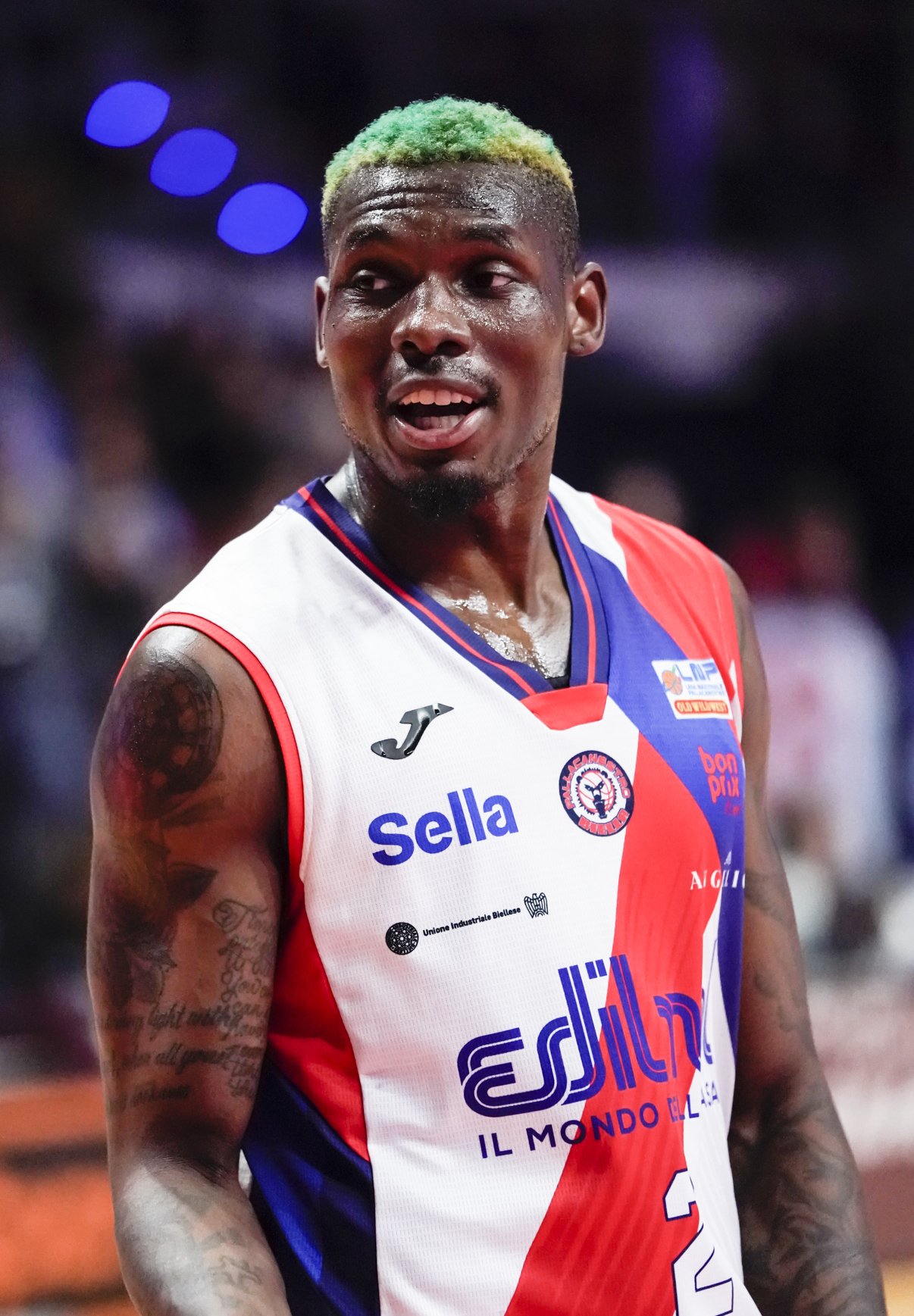
- Omogbo with Biella in 2020

Free agent
- Position: Power forward / center

Personal information
- Born: May 28, 1995 (age 31) Lagos, Nigeria
- Listed height: 6 ft 8 in (2.03 m)
- Listed weight: 210 lb (95 kg)

Career information
- High school: The Kiski School (Saltsburg, Pennsylvania); Princeton Day Academy (Lanham, Maryland)
- College: South Plains (2013–2015); Colorado State (2015–2017)
- NBA draft: 2017: undrafted
- Playing career: 2017–present

Career history
- 2017–2018: Victoria Libertas Pesaro
- 2018–2019: Pieno žvaigždės
- 2019: Ironi Kiryat Ata
- 2019–2020: Biella
- 2020: Peñas Huesca
- 2020–2021: Vëllaznimi
- 2021–2022: APOEL
- 2022–2023: Vëllaznimi
- 2023: Astros de Jalisco
- 2023-2024: JA Vichy
- 2024: Plateros de Fresnillo
- 2024-2025: UB Chartres Métropole

Career highlights
- First-team All-Mountain West (2017); Mountain West All-Defensive Team (2017)

Emmanuel Omogbo (born May 28, 1995) is a Nigerian-American professional basketball player. He played college basketball for South Plains and Colorado State before playing professionally in Italy, Lithuania and Israel. Standing 6 ft 8 in (2.03 m), he plays at the power forward and center positions.

== Early life and college career ==
Omogbo was born in Lagos, Nigeria and raised in Hyattsville, Maryland. Omogbo attended Princeton Day Academy in Lanham, Maryland, where he averaged 14.2 points per game.

Omogbo stated his college career with the South Plains College's Texans, where he averaged 17.0 points per game to go along with 10.1 rebounds per game in his sophomore year. He was selected as a preseason junior college All-American by the Sporting News, and earned second-team JuCo All-America following the season from the NJCAA.

Omogbo played for the Colorado State University's Rams from 2015 to 2017. He finished his CSU career with 28 double-doubles, which is seventh all-time on the MW career list, and his 9.24 rebounds in 69 career games ranks as the fifth-best mark in league annals. Ranks on CSU's top-20 list in career offensive, defensive and total rebounds despite playing just two seasons. On March 17, 2017, Omogbo was named to the NABC All-District (17) first team.

== Professional career ==
=== 2017–18 season ===
After being undrafted in the 2017 NBA draft, he joined the Golden State Warriors for the 2017 NBA Summer League.

On July 22, 2017, Omogbo started his professional career with Victoria Libertas Pesaro of the Italian LBA, signing a one-year deal. In 30 games played for Pesaro, he finished the season as the league third-leading rebounder (8.9 per game) and second in steals (1.7 per game), he also averaged 10.8 points and 1.3 assists per game.

=== 2018–19 season ===
On August 17, 2018, Omogbo signed with the Lithuanian team BC Pieno žvaigždės for the 2018–19 LKL season. On October 20, 2018, Omogbo recorded a career-high 26 points, shooting 10-for-14 from the field, along with nine rebounds and four steals in an 87–81 win over Lietkabelis. In 16 games played for Pieno žvaigždės, he averaged 12 points, 5 rebounds, 1.5 steals while shooting 56.8 percent from the field.

On February 6, 2019, Omogbo parted ways with Pieno žvaigždės to join Ironi Kiryat Ata of the Israeli Israeli National League for the rest of the season. In 10 games played for Kiryat Ata, he averaged a double-double of 15.2 points and 10.2 rebounds per game.

=== 2019–20 season ===
On July 26, 2019, Omogbo signed with Pallacanestro Biella of the Italian Serie A2 Basket. He averaged 11.3 points and 7.3 rebounds per game.

=== 2020–21 season ===
On September 8, 2020, Omogbo signed with Club Baloncesto Peñas Huesca of the Spanish LEB Oro. On January 20, 2021, he joined KB Vëllaznimi of Kosovo Basketball Superlegue. He averaged 18.9 points and 12.0 rebounds per game.

=== 2021-22 season ===
On August 6, 2021, Omogbo signed with Cytavision APOEL Nicosia of the Cypriot Division A.

== Nigeria national team ==
He has been part of Nigeria's national team at the AfroBasket 2021 in Kigali, Rwanda.
