= 2011–12 Air Force Falcons men's basketball team =

American college basketball season

2011–12 Air Force Falcons men's basketball
- Conference: Mountain West Conference
- Record: 13–16 (3–11 Mountain West)
- Head coach: Jeff Reynolds (Fired Feb 8th); Dave Pilipovich (Interim)
- Assistant coaches: Steve Snell; Silvey Dominguez; Drew Long; Tom Bellairs
- Home arena: Clune Arena

2011–12 Mountain West Conference men's basketball standings
| | Conf. | | | | Overall |
| Team | W | | L | PCT | W | | L | PCT |
|---|---|---|---|---|---|---|---|---|
| No. 21 New Mexico † | 10 | – | 4 | .714 | 28 | – | 7 | .800 |
| No. 22 San Diego St | 10 | – | 4 | .714 | 26 | – | 8 | .765 |
| No. 23 UNLV | 9 | – | 5 | .643 | 26 | – | 9 | .743 |
| Colorado State | 8 | – | 6 | .571 | 20 | – | 12 | .625 |
| TCU | 7 | – | 7 | .500 | 18 | – | 15 | .545 |
| Wyoming | 6 | – | 8 | .429 | 21 | – | 12 | .636 |
| Air Force | 3 | – | 11 | .214 | 13 | – | 16 | .448 |
| Boise State | 3 | – | 11 | .214 | 13 | – | 17 | .433 |
† 2012 MWC tournament winner As of March 8, 2012; Rankings from AP Poll

The 2011–12 Air Force Falcons men's basketball team represented the United States Air Force Academy in the 2011–12 NCAA Division I men's basketball season. The Falcons were led by head coach Jeff Reynolds, who was in his 5th season with the team. They played their home games at Clune Arena on the Air Force Academy's main campus in Colorado Springs, Colorado. They finished the season 13–16, with a 3–11 record in Mountain West play, tying for last place in the conference. They lost in the quarterfinals of the Mountain West tournament to New Mexico.

Reynolds was fired on February 8. Dave Pilipovich was named as interim coach for the rest of the season and was named as the permanent head coach following the season's conclusion.

== Roster ==
| # | Name | Height | Weight (lbs.) | Class | Position | Hometown | Previous school |
|---|---|---|---|---|---|---|---|
| 0 | Marek Olesinski | 6–8 | 215 | Freshman | Forward | Forward Roswell, NM | USAFA Prep School |
| 1 | Scott Stucky | 6–3 | 180 | Senior | Guard | Dublin, OH | Dublin Coffman HS |
| 3 | Justin Hammonds | 6–7 | 190 | Freshman | Guard/Forward | Houston, TX | Richland HS |
| 4 | Kamryn Williams | 6–4 | 195 | Freshman | Forward | Colorado Springs, CO | USAFA Prep School |
| 5 | Mike Fitzgerald | 6–6 | 210 | Junior | Guard/Forward | Centerville, MN | St. Thomas Academy |
| 10 | Todd Fletcher | 6–2 | 185 | Junior | Guard | Lee's Summit, MO | Lee's Summit West HS |
| 11 | Chris Carter | 6–3 | 200 | Guard | Freshman | Port St. Lucie, FL | USAFA Prep School |
| 12 | Scott Adler | 6–4 | 185 | Guard | Freshman | Las Cruces, NM | USAFA Prep School |
| 13 | Brian Davison | 6–8 | 195 | Forward | Freshman | Colorado Springs, CO | Montrose HS |
| 14 | Michael Lyons | 6–6 | 198 | Junior | Guard | Newport News, VA | Massanutten Military Acad. |
| 15 | Taylor Stewart | 6–5 | 185 | Senior | Forward | Lexington, KY | Lexington Catholic HS |
| 20 | Rafael Reyes-Rojas | 6–4 | 195 | Guard | Forward | Brawley, CA | USAFA Prep School |
| 21 | DeLovell Earls | 6–5 | 215 | Guard | Freshman | Colorado Springs, CO | USAFA Prep School |
| 22 | Max Yon | 6–5 | 195 | Guard | Freshman | San Antonio, TX | Ronald Reagan HS |
| 23 | Jamil Bailey | 6–4 | 205 | Sophomore | Guard | Dallas, TX | Dallas Jesuit Prep |
| 25 | Kyle Green | 6–2 | 180 | Junior | Guard | Richland Hills, TX | Richland |
| 30 | Adam Brakeville | 6–6 | 215 | Junior | Forward | San Clemente, CA | Corona Del Mar HS |
| 32 | Shawn Hempsey | 6–2 | 180 | Senior | Guard | Encinitas, CA | La Costa Canyon HS |
| 33 | Daniel Grieves | 6–7 | 195 | Freshman | Forward | Gulfport, MS | St. Stanislaus HS |
| 34 | Taylor Broekhuis | 6–10 | 220 | Junior | Center | Colorado Springs, CO | Colorado Springs Christian School |
| 43 | Colt Barnhill | 6–7 | 210 | Freshman | Forward | Grayson, KY | USAFA Prep School |
| 44 | Chase Kammerer | 6–8 | 220 | Sophomore | Forward | Montgomery, TX | St. Thomas HS |

== Schedule and results ==
| Date time, TV | Rank^{#} | Opponent^{#} | Result | Record | Site (attendance) city, state |
Regular season
| 11/11/2011*; 7:30 pm, CBSSN | | Army; All-Military Classic semifinals | W 87–71 | 1–0 | Clune Arena (3,679); Colorado Springs, CO |
| 11/12/2011*; 8:30 pm | | VMI; All-Military Classic championship | W 75–65 | 2–0 | Clune Arena (2,052); Colorado Springs, CO |
| 11/18/2011*; 7:00 pm | | Western State | W 65–37 | 3–0 | Clune Arena (1,450); Colorado Springs, CO |
| 11/23/2011*; 7:00 pm, The Mtn. | | Colorado | L 73–76 ^{OT} | 3–1 | Clune Arena (3,834); Colorado Springs, CO |
| 12/03/2011*; 6:00 pm | | at Drake; MWC-MVC Challenge | L 60–62 | 3–2 | Knapp Center (3,538); Des Moines, IA |
| 12/07/2011*; 7:00 pm | | Wright State | W 55–34 | 4–2 | Clune Arena (1,471); Colorado Springs, CO |
| 12/10/2011*; 7:00 pm | | Arkansas-Pine Bluff | W 63–51 | 5–2 | Clune Arena (2,007); Colorado Springs, CO |
| 12/17/2011*; 7:00 pm | | Maryland Eastern Shore | W 64–60 | 6–2 | Clune Arena (1,469); Colorado Springs, CO |
| 12/22/2011*; 7:00 pm | | at Gonzaga | L 60–70 | 6–3 | McCarthey Athletic Center (6,000); Spokane, WA |
| 12/29/2011*; 7:00 pm | | vs. Wagner; Cable Car Classic semifinals | L 61–72 | 6–4 | Leavey Center (1,782); Santa Clara, CA |
| 12/30/2011*; 7:00 pm | | vs. Eastern Michigan; Cable Car Classic 3rd place game | W 42–37 | 7–4 | Leavey Center (1,702); Santa Clara, CA |
| 01/03/2012*; 7:00 pm | | Johnson & Wales | W 83–53 | 8–4 | Clune Arena (1,248); Colorado Springs, CO |
| 01/06/2012*; 7:00 pm | | Chicago State | W 68–54 | 9–4 | Clune Arena (1,471); Colorado Springs, CO |
| 01/09/2012*; 7:00 pm | | Texas-Pan American | W 67–50 | 10–4 | Clune Arena (869); Colorado Springs, CO |
| 01/14/2012; 4:00 pm, The Mtn. | | at Boise State | W 74–59 | 11–4 (1–0) | Taco Bell Arena (7,875); Boise, ID |
| 01/18/2012; 6:00 pm, The Mtn. | | Wyoming | L 53–64 | 11–5 (1–1) | Clune Arena (1,938); Colorado Springs, CO |
| 01/21/2012; 8:00 pm, The Mtn. | | at No. 16 San Diego State | L 44–57 | 11–6 (1–2) | Viejas Arena (12,414); San Diego, CA |
| 01/25/2012; 5:30 pm, The Mtn. | | at TCU | L 56–59 | 11–7 (1–3) | Daniel–Meyer Coliseum (4,570); Fort Worth, TX |
| 01/28/2012; 7:00 pm, The Mtn. | | No. 12 UNLV | L 63–65 ^{OT} | 11–8 (1–4) | Clune Arena (4,170); Colorado Springs, CO |
| 01/31/2012; 8:00 pm, The Mtn. | | New Mexico | L 42–81 | 11–9 (1–5) | Clune Arena (1,916); Colorado Springs, CO |
| 02/04/2012; 3:00 pm, CBSSN | | at Colorado State | L 49–67 | 11–10 (1–6) | Moby Arena (4,359); Fort Collins, CO |
| 02/11/2012; 7:00 pm, CBSSN | | Boise State | L 61–72 | 11–11 (1–7) | Clune Arena (2,126); Colorado Springs, CO |
| 02/15/2012; 6:00 pm, The Mtn. | | at Wyoming | W 58–53 | 12–11 (2–7) | Arena-Auditorium (4,881); Laramie, WY |
| 02/18/2012; 2:00 pm, NBCSN | | No. 13 San Diego State | W 58–56 | 13–11 (3–7) | Clune Arena (2,483); Colorado Springs, CO |
| 02/22/2012; 6:00 pm, The Mtn. | | TCU | L 62–65 | 13–12 (3–8) | Clune Arena (2,476); Colorado Springs, CO |
| 02/25/2012; 2:00 pm, NBCSN | | at No. 21 UNLV | L 58–68 | 13–13 (3–9) | Thomas & Mack Center (16,036); Paradise, NV |
| 02/29/2012; 6:00 pm, The Mtn. | | at New Mexico | L 56–86 | 13–14 (3–10) | The Pit (15,152); Albuquerque, NM |
| 03/03/2012; 2:00 pm, The Mtn. | | Colorado State | L 65–75 | 13–15 (3–11) | Clune Arena (4,858); Colorado Springs, CO |
2012 Mountain West Conference men's basketball tournament
| 03/08/2012; 7:00 pm, The Mtn. | (7) | vs. (2) New Mexico; Quarterfinals | L 64–79 | 13–16 | Thomas & Mack Center (13,772); Las Vegas, NV |
*Non-conference game. ^{#}Rankings from AP Poll/Coaches' Poll. (#) Tournament seedings in parentheses. All times are in Mountain Time.

== See also ==
- 2011–12 NCAA Division I men's basketball season
- 2011–12 NCAA Division I men's basketball rankings
