= 2012 Mountain West Conference men's basketball tournament =

- Classification: Division I
- Season: 2011–12
- Teams: 8
- Site: Thomas & Mack Center; Paradise, NV
- Champions: New Mexico (2nd title)
- Winning coach: Steve Alford (1st title)
- MVP: Drew Gordon (New Mexico)
- Television: The Mtn., CBSSN, NBCSN

2011–12 Mountain West Conference men's basketball standings
	Conf.				Overall
Team	W		L	PCT	W		L	PCT
No. 21 New Mexico †	10	–	4	.714	28	–	7	.800
No. 22 San Diego St	10	–	4	.714	26	–	8	.765
No. 23 UNLV	9	–	5	.643	26	–	9	.743
Colorado State	8	–	6	.571	20	–	12	.625
TCU	7	–	7	.500	18	–	15	.545
Wyoming	6	–	8	.429	21	–	12	.636
Air Force	3	–	11	.214	13	–	16	.448
Boise State	3	–	11	.214	13	–	17	.433
† 2012 MWC tournament winner As of March 8, 2012; Rankings from AP Poll

The 2012 Mountain West Conference men's basketball tournament was played at the Thomas & Mack Center in Las Vegas, Nevada in March 2012. Sponsored by Conoco; it was the first tournament without BYU or Utah, but included newcomer Boise State.

New Mexico won the conference tournament championship game over San Diego State, 68–59, to earn an automatic trip to the NCAA tournament.[1]

== Bracket ==
Quarterfinals; Thursday, March 8 MTN, CBSSN
1	#18 San Diego State	65
8	Boise State	62
4	Colorado State	81
5	TCU	60
3	#20 UNLV	56
6	Wyoming	48
2	New Mexico	79
7	Air Force	64

Semifinals; Friday, March 9 CBSSN
1	#18 San Diego State	79
4	Colorado State	69
3	#20 UNLV	67
2	New Mexico	72

Championship; Saturday, March 10; NBCSN
1	#18 San Diego State	59
2	New Mexico	68
