= 2011–12 Wyoming Cowboys basketball team =

American college basketball season

2011–12 Wyoming Cowboys basketball

CBI, Quarterfinals
- Conference: Mountain West Conference
- Record: 21–12 (6–8 Mountain West)
- Head coach: Larry Shyatt
- Assistant coaches: Scott Duncan; Jeremy Shyatt; Allen Edwards
- Home arena: Arena-Auditorium (Capacity: 15,028)

2011–12 Mountain West Conference men's basketball standings
	Conf.				Overall
Team	W		L	PCT	W		L	PCT
No. 21 New Mexico †	10	–	4	.714	28	–	7	.800
No. 22 San Diego St	10	–	4	.714	26	–	8	.765
No. 23 UNLV	9	–	5	.643	26	–	9	.743
Colorado State	8	–	6	.571	20	–	12	.625
TCU	7	–	7	.500	18	–	15	.545
Wyoming	6	–	8	.429	21	–	12	.636
Air Force	3	–	11	.214	13	–	16	.448
Boise State	3	–	11	.214	13	–	17	.433
† 2012 MWC tournament winner As of March 8, 2012; Rankings from AP Poll

The 2011–12 Wyoming Cowboys basketball team (Note: The university uses "Cowgirls" as its women's athletic nickname.) represented the University of Wyoming during the 2011–2012 NCAA Division I men's basketball season. Their head coach was Larry Shyatt in his first year. They played their home games at the Arena-Auditorium in Laramie, Wyoming. The Cowboys are a member of the Mountain West Conference. They finished the season 21–12, 6–8 in Mountain West play to finish in sixth place. They lost in the quarterfinals of the Mountain West Basketball tournament to UNLV. They were invited to the 2012 College Basketball Invitational where they defeated North Dakota State in the first round before falling to Washington State in the quarterfinals.

== Roster ==
2011–12 Wyoming Cowboys men's basketball team
Players
Coaches

Pos.	#	Name	Height	Weight	Year	Previous school	Hometown
G	1	JayDee Luster	5 ft 9 in (1.75 m)	160 lb (73 kg)	Sr	New Mexico State	San Diego, CA
G	2	Arthur Bouëdo	6 ft 4 in (1.93 m)	185 lb (84 kg)	Sr	Stoneridge Prep	Aix–en–Provence, France
G	3	Shakir Smith	6 ft 1 in (1.85 m)	165 lb (75 kg)	Fr	Tucson HS	Tucson, AZ
F	5	Leonard Washington	6 ft 7 in (2.01 m)	235 lb (107 kg)	RS Jr	USC	Lake Charles, LA
G	10	Derrious Gilmore	5 ft 9 in (1.75 m)	165 lb (75 kg)	Jr	Jones County JC	Baltimore, MD
G/F	11	Afam Muojeke	6 ft 8 in (2.03 m)	210 lb (95 kg)	Sr	Genesis One Prep.	Jamaica, NY
G	12	Riley Grabau	6 ft 2 in (1.88 m)	170 lb (77 kg)	Fr	Boulder HS	Boulder, CO
G	13	Jack Bentz	6 ft 0 in (1.83 m)	170 lb (77 kg)	Fr	University School, Ohio	Chagrin Falls, OH
C	15	Adam Waddell	6 ft 10 in (2.08 m)	235 lb (107 kg)	Sr	Cody HS	Cody, WY
G/F	22	Larry Nance Jr.	6 ft 7 in (2.01 m)	205 lb (93 kg)	Fr	Revere High School	Richfield, OH
F	24	Tyrone Marshall	6 ft 8 in (2.03 m)	220 lb (100 kg)	Fr	George Washington High School	Denver, CO
G	25	Luke Martinez	6 ft 4 in (1.93 m)	185 lb (84 kg)	RS Jr	Williston State College	Bismarck, ND
F	30	Rob Watsabaugh	6 ft 7 in (2.01 m)	210 lb (95 kg)	RS Sr	West Hills College	Jackson, WY
G	33	Francisco Cruz	6 ft 3 in (1.91 m)	217 lb (98 kg)	Sr	Western Nebraska CC	Nogales, Mexico

Head coach

- Larry Shyatt (Wooster)

Assistant coach(es)

- Scott Duncan (Wooster)
- Allen Edwards (Kentucky)
- Jeremy Shyatt (Clemson)

Legend

- (C) Team captain
- (S) Suspended
- (I) Ineligible
- (W) Walk-on
- Injured
- Current redshirt

== Statistics ==
Player	GP	GS	MPG	FG%	3FG%	FT%	RPG	APG	SPG	BPG	PPG
Jack Bentz	10	0	1.8	.000	.000	.000	0.0	0.1	0.1	0.0	0.0
Arthur Bouëdo	33	2	11.9	.455	.368	1.000	0.8	0.7	0.2	0.0	2.3
Francisco Cruz	33	33	32.3	.452	.367	.750	2.9	2.2	0.8	0.1	12.0
Derrious Gilmore	24	1	12.4	.358	.353	.737	0.8	1.1	0.5	0.0	3.1
Riley Grabau	21	0	7.2	.300	.154	1.000	0.4	0.8	0.1	0.0	0.9
JayDee Luster	33	32	29.8	.360	.328	.700	2.1	3.7	0.9	0.0	5.3
Tyrone Marshall	9	0	4.3	.200	.000	.600	0.8	0.0	0.1	0.1	0.8
Luke Martinez	32	31	29.5	.377	.335	.800	4.0	1.5	1.7	0.3	11.8
Afam Muojeke	12	0	6.7	.227	.133	.824	1.3	0.3	0.5	0.1	2.2
Larry Nance Jr.	33	0	17.9	.462	.333	.814	4.0	0.4	0.8	0.6	4.1
Shakir Smith	15	0	4.2	.105	.100	1.000	0.4	0.0	0.2	0.1	0.5
Adam Waddell	33	33	28.1	.541	.000	.724	3.4	0.7	0.5	1.0	9.6
Leonard Washington	33	32	26.0	.560	.304	.714	6.9	0.6	1.2	1.1	12.9
Rob Watsabaugh	31	1	6.9	.619	.333	.333	1.3	0.1	0.2	0.1	1.0

== Schedule and results ==
Date time, TV	Rank^{#}	Opponent^{#}	Result	Record	Site (attendance) city, state
Exhibition
November 5, 2011*; 6:00 pm		CSU Pueblo	W 85–78	–	Arena-Auditorium (4,897); Laramie, WY
Regular season
November 12, 2011*; 8:00 pm		Western State	W 78–39	1–0	Arena-Auditorium (4,597); Laramie, WY
November 15, 2011*; 7:00 pm		Northern Colorado	W 75–56	2–0	Arena-Auditorium (4,360); Laramie, WY
November 19, 2011*; 6:00 pm		at Green Bay	L 44–52	2–1	Resch Center (2,740); Green Bay, WI
November 22, 2011*; 7:00 pm		South Dakota	W 67–56	3–1	Arena-Auditorium (4,238); Laramie, WY
November 25, 2011*; 7:00 pm		Portland State; Jim Thorpe Classic	W 65–51	4–1	Arena-Auditorium (4,396); Laramie, WY
November 26, 2011*; 7:00 pm		Maryland Eastern Shore; Jim Thorpe Classic	W 73–43	5–1	Arena-Auditorium (4,182); Laramie, WY
November 27, 2011*; 7:00 pm		Louisiana Tech; Jim Thorpe Classic	W 73–58	6–1	Arena-Auditorium (4,083); Laramie, WY
November 30, 2011*; 7:00 pm		Utah Valley	W 74–41	7–1	Arena-Auditorium (4,137); Laramie, WY
December 3, 2011*; 8:00 pm		Bradley; MWC – MVC Challenge	W 66–49	8–1	Arena-Auditorium (4,643); Laramie, WY
December 9, 2011*; 7:00 pm, RTRM		at Colorado	W 65–54	9–1	Coors Events Center (7,049); Boulder, CO
December 13, 2011*; 7:00 pm, The Mtn.		UC Irvine	W 58–48	10–1	Arena-Auditorium (4,084); Laramie, WY
December 16, 2011*; 7:00 pm		Sioux Falls	W 62–54	11–1	Arena-Auditorium (3,996); Laramie, WY
December 19, 2011*; 6:00 pm, RTRM		at Denver	L 46–57	11–2	Magness Arena (7,168); Denver, CO
December 22, 2011*; 7:05 pm		at Idaho State	W 80–56	12–2	Holt Arena (2,190); Pocatello, ID
January 3, 2012*; 7:05 pm, FCS		at Utah Valley	W 76–70	13–2	UCCU Center (6,556); Orem, UT
January 9, 2012*; 7:00 pm		Idaho State	W 73–49	14–2	Arena-Auditorium (4,628); Laramie, WY
January 14, 2012; 7:00 pm, The Mtn.		New Mexico	L 62–72	14–3 (0–1)	Arena-Auditorium (6,955); Laramie, WY
January 18, 2012; 6:00 pm, The Mtn.		at Air Force	W 64–53	15–3 (1–1)	Clune Arena (1,938); Colorado Springs, CO
January 21, 2012; 4:00 pm, The Mtn.		Colorado State	W 70–51	16–3 (2–1)	Arena-Auditorium (7,901); Laramie, WY
January 24, 2012; 6:30 pm, The Mtn.		No. 13 San Diego State	L 42–52	16–4 (2–2)	Arena-Auditorium (5,692); Laramie, WY
January 28, 2012; 1:30 pm, The Mtn.		at Boise State	W 75–64	17–4 (3–2)	Taco Bell Arena (4,052); Boise, ID
February 1, 2012; 6:00 pm, The Mtn.		at TCU	L 52–58	17–5 (3–3)	Daniel–Meyer Coliseum (4,720); Fort Worth, TX
February 4, 2012; 2:00 pm, The Mtn.		No. 11 UNLV	W 68–66	18–5 (4–3)	Arena-Auditorium (7,179); Laramie, WY
February 11, 2012; 1:30 pm, The Mtn.		at New Mexico	L 38–48	18–6 (4–4)	The Pit (15,140); Albuquerque, NM
February 15, 2012; 6:00 pm, The Mtn.		Air Force	L 53–58	18–7 (4–5)	Arena-Auditorium (4,881); Laramie, WY
February 18, 2012; 7:00 pm, The Mtn.		at Colorado State	L 46–54	18–8 (4–6)	Moby Arena (8,745); Fort Collins, CO
February 22, 2012; 8:30 pm, The Mtn.		at No. 24 San Diego State	L 58–67	18–9 (4–7)	Viejas Arena (12,414); San Diego, CA
February 25, 2012; 2:00 pm, The Mtn.		Boise State	W 64–54	19–9 (5–7)	Arena-Auditorium (6,281); Laramie, WY
February 28, 2012; 7:30 pm, The Mtn.		TCU	W 71–59	20–9 (6–7)	Arena-Auditorium (5,174); Laramie, WY
March 3, 2012; 8:30 pm, The Mtn.		at No. 17 UNLV	L 63–74	20–10 (6–8)	Thomas & Mack Center (18,577); Paradise, NV
Mountain West tournament
March 8, 2012; 8:30 pm, The Mtn.	(6)	vs. (3) No. 20 UNLV; Quarterfinals	L 48–56	20–11	Thomas & Mack Center (13,772); Las Vegas, NV
CBI
03/14/2012*; 7:00 pm, HDNet		North Dakota State; First Round	W 78–75	21–11	Arena-Auditorium (2,732); Laramie, WY
03/19/2012*; 8:00 pm		at Washington State; Quarterfinals	L 41–61	21–12	Beasley Coliseum (3,019); Pullman, WA
*Non-conference game. ^{#}Rankings from AP Poll. (#) Tournament seedings in parentheses. All times are in Mountain Time.
