= Rick Fisher (basketball) =

American basketball player (1948–2019)

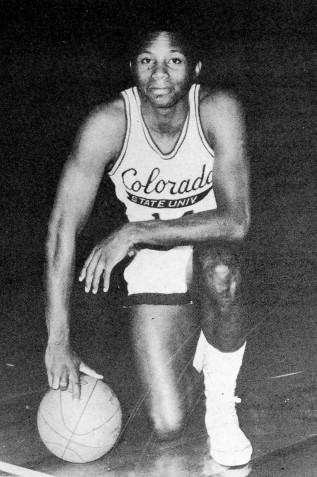
- Fisher c. 1971

Personal information
- Born: October 27, 1948 Denver, Colorado, U.S.
- Died: December 20, 2019 (aged 71) Oxnard, California, U.S.
- Listed height: 6 ft 5 in (1.96 m)
- Listed weight: 215 lb (98 kg)

Career information
- High school: George Washington (Denver, Colorado)
- College: Trinidad State (1967–1968); Colorado State (1970–1971)
- NBA draft: 1971: 2nd round, 27th overall pick
- Drafted by: Portland Trail Blazers
- Position: Power forward
- Number: 22

Career history
- 1971–1972: Utah Stars
- 1972: The Floridians
- Stats at Basketball Reference

Richard B. Fisher (October 27, 1948 – December 20, 2019) was an American professional basketball power forward who spent one season in the American Basketball Association (ABA) as a member of the Utah Stars and The Floridians (1971–72). He attended Trinidad State Junior College where he played quarterback for the school's football team. Fisher transferred to Colorado State University where he became a standout on the basketball team. He was drafted by the Portland Trail Blazers during the second round of the 1971 NBA draft, but he never signed.

Fisher died on December 20, 2019.
