= Jim Williams (basketball) =

American basketball coach and athletics administrator

Biographical details
- Born: March 19, 1915; Malad City, Idaho, U.S.
- Died: May 31, 2007 (aged 92); Fort Collins, Colorado, U.S.

Coaching career (HC unless noted)

Football
- 1946–1953: Snow

Basketball
- 1946–1954: Snow
- 1954–1980: Colorado State

Administrative career (AD unless noted)
- 1965–1968: Colorado State

Head coaching record
- Overall: 352–283 (college basketball); 129–65 (junior college basketball)

Jim Williams (March 19, 1915 – May 31, 2007) was an American basketball coach and college athletics administrator. He served the head coach of the Colorado State University men's basketball program for 26 seasons, from 1954 to 1980. Williams succeeded Bill Strannigan following the program's first ever NCAA Tournament appearance. During his tenure he amassed 352 wins, the most for any Division I college coach in Colorado history. His teams made a total of four NCAA Tournament and two NIT appearances. In 1969 he took the Rams to the Elite Eight of the NCAA Tournament, beating arch-rival Colorado in the Sweet Sixteen before losing a tightly contested game to Drake University.

Williams graduated with a bachelor's and master's from Utah State University.

Williams also served as the school's athletic director during the construction of Moby Arena and Hughes Stadium and the school's entrance into the Western Athletic Conference.

Following his dismissal in 1980 Williams continued to attend CSU games where he was given his own special courtside seat. Williams was also among the first entrants in CSU Sports Hall of Fame. He died at the age of 92.
