= 2011–12 Boise State Broncos men's basketball team =

American college basketball season

2011–12 Boise State Broncos men's basketball
- Conference: Mountain West Conference
- Record: 13–17 (3–11 MW)
- Head coach: Leon Rice
- Assistant coaches: Dave Wojcik; Jeff Linder; John Rillie
- Home arena: Taco Bell Arena

2011–12 Mountain West Conference men's basketball standings
	Conf.				Overall
Team	W		L	PCT	W		L	PCT
No. 21 New Mexico †	10	–	4	.714	28	–	7	.800
No. 22 San Diego St	10	–	4	.714	26	–	8	.765
No. 23 UNLV	9	–	5	.643	26	–	9	.743
Colorado State	8	–	6	.571	20	–	12	.625
TCU	7	–	7	.500	18	–	15	.545
Wyoming	6	–	8	.429	21	–	12	.636
Air Force	3	–	11	.214	13	–	16	.448
Boise State	3	–	11	.214	13	–	17	.433
† 2012 MWC tournament winner As of March 8, 2012; Rankings from AP Poll

The 2011–12 Boise State Broncos men's basketball team represented Boise State University during the 2011–12 NCAA Division I men's basketball season. The Broncos, led by second-year head coach Leon Rice, played their home games at Taco Bell Arena and were first-year members of the Mountain West Conference. They finished the season 13–17, 3–11 in Mountain West play, to finish in a tie for last place. They lost in the quarterfinals of the Mountain West Basketball tournament to San Diego State.

== Roster ==
Number	Name	Position	Height	Weight	Year	Hometown
1	Mikey Thompson	Guard	6–3	167	Freshman	Las Vegas, Nevada
2	Derrick Marks	Guard	6–3	206	Freshman	Joliet, Illinois
3	Anthony Drmic	Guard/Forward	6–6	196	Freshman	Endeavour Hills, Victoria, Australia
5	Joe Hanstad	Guard	6–4	193	Freshman	Dickinson, North Dakota
10	Tre Nichols	Guard	5–11	170	Senior	Killeen, Texas
11	Jeff Elorriaga	Guard	6–2	180	Sophomore	Portland, Oregon
12	Igor Hadziomerovic	Guard	6–4	202	Freshman	Melbourne, Australia
15	Thomas Bropleh	Forward	6–5	203	Sophomore	Denver, Colorado
21	Case Rada	Guard	6–2	190	Freshman	Burbank, Washington
22	Drew Wiley	Guard	6–7	214	Junior	McKenzie River, Oregon
23	Ryan Watkins	Forward	6–8	229	Sophomore	Santa Clarita, California
24	Darrious Hamilton	Forward	6–8	222	Freshman	San Antonio
30	Westly Perryman	Guard	6–2	179	Senior	Boston
33	Jarrell Crayton	Forward	6–7	212	Junior	Omaha, Nebraska
34	Jake Ness	Forward	6–8	214	Freshman	Coeur d'Alene, Idaho
42	Kenny Buckner	Center	6–7	251	Junior	Washington, D.C.

== Schedule ==
Date time, TV	Rank^{#}	Opponent^{#}	Result	Record	Site (attendance) city, state
Exhibition
11/08/2011*; 7:00 pm		UC Colorado Springs	W 93–47	–	Taco Bell Arena (1,599); Boise, Idaho
Regular season
11/11/2011*; 7:30 pm		Colorado Christian	W 95–44	1–0	Taco Bell Arena (3,302); Boise, Idaho
11/16/2011*; 6:00 pm, The Mtn.		Utah	W 80–59	2–0	Taco Bell Arena (4,551); Boise, Idaho
11/19/2011*; 1:00 pm		Cal State Northridge	W 103–61	3–0	Taco Bell Arena (2,446); Boise, Idaho
11/22/2011*; 8:05 pm		at Long Beach State	L 62–72	3–1	Walter Pyramid (3,866); Long Beach, California
11/26/2011*; 7:00 pm		Northern Illinois	W 71–57	4–1	Taco Bell Arena (3,019); Boise, Idaho
11/30/2011*; 7:00 pm		Drake	W 108–64	5–1	Taco Bell Arena (3,235); Boise, Idaho
12/03/2011*; 8:00 pm		Indiana State; MWC–MVC Challenge	W 74–65	6–1	Taco Bell Arena (5,342); Boise, Idaho
12/05/2011*; 7:00 pm		Idaho State	W 79–55	7–1	Taco Bell Arena (3,337); Boise, Idaho
12/07/2011*; 7:00 pm		Portland	W 92–70	8–1	Taco Bell Arena (2,460); Boise, Idaho
12/10/2011*; 6:00 pm, CST		at LSU	L 45–64	8–2	Maravich Center (7,398); Baton Rouge, Louisiana
12/17/2011*; 4:30 pm, RTRM		at Denver	L 62–79	8–3	Magness Arena (2,335); Denver
12/19/2011*; 7:00 pm, The Mtn.		Fresno State	W 70–63	9–3	Taco Bell Arena (3,702); Boise, Idaho
12/22/2011*; 6:30 pm		at Iowa	L 72–81	9–4	Carver–Hawkeye Arena (13,122); Iowa City, Iowa
12/31/2011*; 12:00 pm		vs. Idaho	W 76–73	10–4	Idaho Center (7,540); Nampa, Idaho
01/02/2012*; 8:00 pm		at Fresno State	L 59–72	10–5	Save Mart Center (5,924); Fresno, California
01/14/2012; 4:00 pm, The Mtn.		Air Force	L 59–74	10–6 (0–1)	Taco Bell Arena (7,875); Boise, Idaho
01/17/2012; 8:00 pm, The Mtn.		at Colorado State	L 55–66	10–7 (0–2)	Moby Arena (4,753); Fort Collins, Colorado
01/21/2012; 1:30 pm, The Mtn.		at TCU	L 52–54	10–8 (0–3)	Daniel–Meyer Coliseum (4,995); Fort Worth, Texas
01/25/2012; 8:00 pm, The Mtn.		No. 12 UNLV	L 72–77 ^{OT}	10–9 (0–4)	Taco Bell Arena (6,024); Boise, Idaho
01/28/2012; 1:30 pm, The Mtn.		Wyoming	L 64–75	10–10 (0–5)	Taco Bell Arena (4,052); Boise, Idaho
02/01/2012; 8:00 pm, CBSSN		at No. 17 San Diego State	L 56–58	10–11 (0–6)	Viejas Arena (12,414); San Diego
02/04/2012; 2:00 pm, NBCSN		New Mexico	L 49–65	10–12 (0–7)	Taco Bell Arena (4,159); Boise, Idaho
02/11/2012; 7:00 pm, CBSSN		at Air Force	W 72–61	11–12 (1–7)	Clune Arena (2,126); Colorado Springs, Colorado
02/15/2012; 8:00 pm, The Mtn.		Colorado State	W 70–69	12–12 (2–7)	Taco Bell Arena (3,312); Boise, Idaho
02/18/2012; 2:00 pm, The Mtn.		TCU	W 65–64	13–12 (3–7)	Taco Bell Arena (6,785); Boise, Idaho
02/22/2012; 8:00 pm, CBSSN		at No. 21 UNLV	L 58–75	13–13 (3–8)	Thomas & Mack Center (14,409); Paradise, Nevada
02/25/2012; 2:00 pm, The Mtn.		at Wyoming	L 54–64	13–14 (3–9)	Arena-Auditorium (6,281); Laramie, Wyoming
02/29/2012; 8:00 pm, The Mtn.		No. 21 San Diego State	L 53–66	13–15 (3–10)	Taco Bell Arena (6,145); Boise, Idaho
03/03/2012; 2:00 pm, NBCSN		at New Mexico	L 61–76	13–16 (3–11)	The Pit (15,411); Albuquerque, New Mexico
2012 Mountain West Conference men's basketball tournament
03/08/2012; 1:00 pm, The Mtn.		vs. No. 18 San Diego State; Quarterfinals	L 62–65	13–17	Thomas & Mack Center (8,601); Paradise, Nevada
*Non-conference game. ^{#}Rankings from AP Poll. (#) Tournament seedings in parentheses. All times are in Mountain Time.
