= 2018–19 LKL season =

Betsafe-LKL
- Season: 2018–19
- Duration: September 2018 – June 2019
- Games played: 200 (180 regular season, 20 playoffs)
- Teams: 10

Regular season
- Season MVP: (Lithuania) Martinas Geben

Finals
- Champions: Žalgiris (21st title)
- Runners-up: Rytas
- Third place: Neptūnas
- Fourth place: Lietkabelis
- Finals MVP: (Lithuania) Edgaras Ulanovas

Statistical leaders
Points	(Turkey) Kerem Kanter	16.8
Rebounds	(Lithuania) Martinas Geben	7.4
Assists	(Lithuania) Dovis Bičkauskis	5.7

Records
- Biggest home win: Žalgiris 93–48 Skycop (30 December 2018)
- Biggest away win: Pieno žvaigždės 68–109 Žalgiris (25 November 2018)
- Highest scoring: Šiauliai 82–117 Rytas (1 May 2019)
- Winning streak: 12 games Žalgiris
- Losing streak: 12 games Nevėžis
- Highest attendance: 11,294; Žalgiris 95–86 Rytas (9 December 2018)
- All statistics correct as of 1 August 2019.

The 2018–19 Lietuvos krepšinio lyga, also called Betsafe-LKL for sponsorship reasons, was the 26th season of the top-tier level professional basketball league of Lithuania, the Lietuvos krepšinio lyga (LKL). The Betsafe LKL championship started on 22 September 2018 and ended on 1 June 2019.

Žalgiris achieved their 21st title overall, ninth consecutive.

== Competition format ==
During the regular season, all teams play 36 games. The top eight teams in the regular season standings, after playing their entire 36 game schedule, qualified for the playoffs in the quarterfinals, that was played in a best-of-three games format. The semifinals were played in best-of-three format.

The final round was played between the two winners of the semifinals. The finals series, for first place, as also games for third place were played in a best-of-five format.

== Teams ==
=== Location and arenas ===
Location of teams in 2018–19 LKL

Ten teams were granted licences for the season.

Team	Location	Arena	Capacity
Dzūkija	Alytus	Alytus Arena	5,500
Juventus	Utena	Utena Arena	2,000
Lietkabelis	Panevėžys	Cido Arena	5,950
Neptūnas	Klaipėda	Švyturys Arena	6,200
Nevėžis	Kėdainiai	Kėdainiai Arena	2,200
Pieno žvaigždės	Pasvalys	Pieno žvaigždės Arena	1,500
Rytas	Vilnius	Jeep Arena	2,500
Rytas	Vilnius	Siemens Arena	10,000
Šiauliai	Šiauliai	Šiauliai Arena	5,700
Skycop Prienai	Prienai	Prienai Arena	1,500
Žalgiris	Kaunas	Žalgiris Arena	15,708

== Regular season ==
=== League table ===
Pos	Team	Pld	W	L	PF	PA	PD	Qualification or relegation
1	Žalgiris	36	32	4	3153	2551	+602	Advance to play-offs
2	Neptūnas	36	28	8	3045	2801	+244	Advance to play-offs
3	Rytas	36	26	10	3018	2752	+266	Advance to play-offs
4	Lietkabelis	36	23	13	2975	2840	+135	Advance to play-offs
5	Pieno žvaigždės	36	16	20	2978	3146	−168	Advance to play-offs
6	Juventus	36	15	21	2974	2955	+19	Advance to play-offs
7	Skycop Prienai	36	13	23	2788	3036	−248	Advance to play-offs
8	Dzūkija	36	12	24	2901	3009	−108	Advance to play-offs
9	Nevėžis	36	8	28	2698	3096	−398	
10	Šiauliai	36	7	29	2968	3112	−144	Relegation to NKL

Source: LKL

=== Results ===
Home \ Away	DZU	JUV	LTK	NEP	NEV	PIE	RYT	SIA	PRI	ZAL	DZU	JUV	LTK	NEP	NEV	PIE	RYT	SIA	PRI	ZAL
Dzūkija	—	75–86	85–68	91–94	81–61	77–86	73–79	91–81	88–73	65–94	—	91–94	84–87	82–88	86–73	75–70	77–84	101–84	88–78	75–90
Juventus	86–77	—	70–76	88–80	88–61	82–79	68–79	83–78	78–67	80–87	81–84	—	78–96	88–89	90–86	107–72	87–92	96–67	89–90	80–98
Lietkabelis	71–69	81–77	—	76–100	87–66	94–63	73–95	81–73	73–81	69–73	85–78	74–89	—	69–73	101–60	89–86	83–74	95–83	92–74	76–81
Neptūnas	89–67	81–70	76–89	—	100–76	77–80	78–93	80–76	92–67	98–93	70–68	101–87	72–74	—	86–76	89–103	89–74	96–75	85–68	81–71
Nevėžis	68–74	97–93	68–83	69–83	—	80–86	70–80	78–71	80–78	55–79	98–88	55–87	80–97	70–78	—	90–86	74–75	76–85	91–96	70–102
Pieno žvaigždės	60–74	90–71	87–81	69–88	92–67	—	78–89	96–86	96–92	68–109	110–107	89–78	104–99	75–85	91–85	—	83–99	97–111	72–84	67–91
Rytas	89–79	87–57	83–94	66–78	100–61	89–82	—	90–63	95–66	69–76	92–69	93–82	75–96	70–52	68–70	80–74	—	100–96	84–57	59–85
Šiauliai	87–76	98–94	83–88	88–98	78–81	79–81	75–82	—	90–100	68–93	97–110	77–91	81–101	103–106	87–88	76–91	82–117	—	90–84	78–93
Skycop Prienai	85–72	85–80	93–78	72–83	96–93	93–88	71–81	80–88	—	53–74	83–82	69–82	70–78	68–75	81–78	82–91	68–75	88–90	—	81–76
Žalgiris	88–75	72–69	71–58	60–75	81–68	103–66	95–86	102–61	93–48	—	100–68	82–68	85–63	90–80	82–79	88–70	91–75	109–83	96–67	—

Source: LKL.lt
Legend: Blue = home team win; Red = away team win.

== Play–offs ==
Quarterfinals and semifinals were played in a best–of–three games format, while the finals in a best–of–five format.

=== Bracket ===
Quarterfinals
Žalgiris	2
Dzūkija	0
BC Lietkabelis	2
Pieno žvaigždės	0
Neptūnas	2
Skycop Prienai	1
Rytas	2
Juventus	1

Semifinals
Žalgiris	2
Lietkabelis	0
Neptūnas	0
Rytas	2

Finals
Žalgiris	3
Rytas	0
Third place
Neptūnas	3
Lietkabelis	0

=== Quarterfinals ===
Team 1	Series	Team 2	Game 1	Game 2	Game 3
Žalgiris	2–0	Dzūkija	89–70	81–62	
Neptūnas	2–1	Skycop Prienai	102–78	85–94	77–71
Rytas	2–1	Juventus	93–91	83–92	84–63
Lietkabelis	2–0	Pieno žvaigždės	95–87	105–98	

=== Semifinals ===
Team 1	Series	Team 2	Game 1	Game 2	Game 3
Žalgiris	2–0	Lietkabelis	78–58	84–63	
Neptūnas	0–2	Rytas	46–75	70–83	

=== Third-place series ===
Team 1	Series	Team 2	Game 1	Game 2	Game 3	Game 4	Game 5
Neptūnas	3–0	Lietkabelis	89–77	88–75	84–77		

=== Finals ===
Team 1	Series	Team 2	Game 1	Game 2	Game 3	Game 4	Game 5
Žalgiris	3–0	Rytas	79–64	85–67	92–54		

== Awards ==
All official awards of the 2018–19 LKL season.

=== Regular Season MVP ===
Pos.	Player	Team
C	(Lithuania) Martinas Geben	Juventus

=== LKL Finals Most Valuable Player Award ===
Pos.	Player	Team
SF	(Lithuania) Edgaras Ulanovas	Žalgiris

=== LKL Defensive Player of the Year ===
Pos.	Player	Team
PG	(United States) Thomas Walkup	Žalgiris

=== All-LKL Team ===
Pos.	Player	Team
PG	(Lithuania) Žygimantas Janavičius	Skycop
SG	(Lithuania) Marius Grigonis	Žalgiris
SF	(Lithuania) Edgaras Ulanovas	Žalgiris
PF	(Lithuania) Arnas Butkevičius	Rytas
C	(United States) Brandon Davies	Žalgiris

=== Player of the week ===
Round	Player	Team	PIR
1	(Lithuania) Mindaugas Lukauskis	Skycop	29
2	(Nigeria) Emmanuel Omogbo	Pieno žvaigždės	26.5
3	(United States) Jerai Grant	Neptūnas	20,5
4	(United States) Mike Bruesewitz	Skycop	31
5	(Nigeria) Emmanuel Omogbo	Pieno žvaigždės	37
6	(United States) Lorenzo Williams	Neptūnas	40
7	(Lithuania) Vaidas Čepukaitis	Juventus	30
8	(Lithuania) Arnas Butkevičius	Rytas	30
9	(Lithuania) Marius Grigonis	Žalgiris	25
10	(United States) Alex Hamilton	Juventus	30
11	(United States) Jerai Grant	Neptūnas	33
12	(Lithuania) Žygimantas Skučas	Pieno žvaigždės	25
13	(United States) Mike Bruesewitz	Skycop	38
14	(United States) Brandon Davies	Žalgiris	25
15	(United States) Kyle Weaver	Neptūnas	38
16	(United States) Nate Wolters	Žalgiris	32
17	(Lithuania) Žygimantas Skučas	Pieno žvaigždės	32
18	(Lithuania) Tomas Lekūnas	Pieno žvaigždės	30
19	(Lithuania) Saulius Kulvietis	Lietkabelis	34
20	(France) Leo Westermann	Žalgiris	22
21	(Lithuania) Martynas Echodas	Rytas	32
22	(United States) Cedrick Bowen	Šiauliai	26
23	(Lithuania) Mindaugas Girdžiūnas	Rytas	37
24	(United States) Jay Threatt	Pieno žvaigždės	25
25	(Turkey) Kerem Kanter	Dzūkija	28,5
26	(United States) Derek Needham	Rytas	31
27	(Lithuania) Deividas Gailius	Neptūnas	28
28	(Lithuania) Martinas Geben	Juventus	22,5
29	(Lithuania) Gytis Masiulis	Neptūnas	32,5
30	(United States) Zaid Hearst	Nevėžis	32,5

=== Player of the month ===
Month	Player	Team	PIR
September	(Lithuania) Ignas Vaitkus	Šiauliai	24
October	(Nigeria) Emmanuel Omogbo	Pieno žvaigždės	20,6
November	(Lithuania) Arnas Butkevičius	Rytas	20,8
December	(United States) Jerai Grant	Neptūnas	24,7
January	(Lithuania) Tomas Lekūnas	Pieno žvaigždės	22,3
February	(Turkey) Kerem Kanter	Dzūkija	31
March	(Lithuania) Martinas Geben	Juventus	22,5
April	(Lithuania) Gytis Masiulis	Neptūnas	19,8

=== Player of the playoffs stages ===
Round	Player	Team	PIR
Quarter-Finals	(Lithuania) Arnas Butkevičius	Rytas	30
Semi-Finals	(United States) Brandon Davies	Žalgiris	23,5
Finals	(Lithuania) Edgaras Ulanovas	Žalgiris	20

== Lithuanian clubs in European competitions ==
Team	Competition	Progress
Žalgiris	EuroLeague	Quarterfinals
Rytas	EuroCup	Quarterfinals
Neptūnas	Champions League	Round of 16
Lietkabelis	Champions League	Regular season
Šiauliai	Champions League	First qualifying round
