= Andy Ogide =

American-born Nigerian basketball player

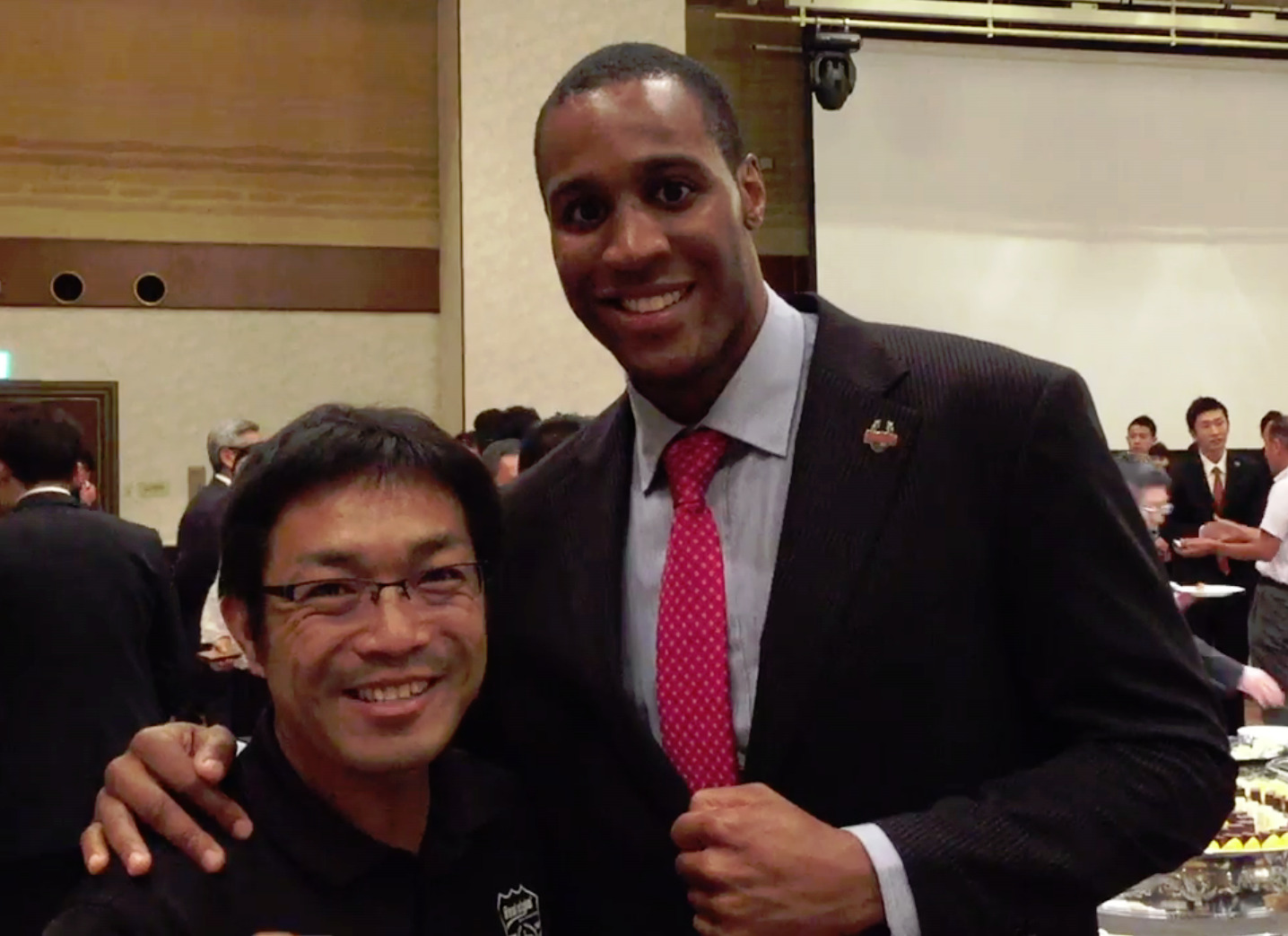

OGM Ormanspor
- Position: Forward
- League: TBL

Personal information
- Born: October 1, 1987 (age 39) Marietta, Georgia
- Listed height: 6 ft 8 in (2.03 m)
- Listed weight: 235 lb (107 kg)

Career information
- High school: Paulding County (Dallas, Georgia)
- College: Ole Miss (2006–2007); Colorado State (2008–2011)
- NBA draft: 2011: undrafted
- Playing career: 2011–present

Career history
- 2011–2012: CB Breogán
- 2012: Gipuzkoa
- 2012–2013: Ourense
- 2013–2014: Universitet Yugra Surgut
- 2014–2015: Poitiers Basket 86
- 2015: Hapoel Migdal HaEmek
- 2016–2017: Bambitious Nara
- 2017–2018: Roseto Sharks
- 2018–2020: Assigeco Casalpusterlengo
- 2020–2021: San Severo
- 2021–present: OGM Ormanspor
Medals
Men's basketball
Representing Nigeria
FIBA Africa Championship
Gold medal – first place	2015 Tunisia

Andy Obinna Young Ogide (born October 1, 1987) is an American-born Nigerian basketball player for OGM Ormanspor of the TBL. He attended the University of Mississippi before transferring to Colorado State University to graduate there. After college basketball, Ogide settled into pro basketball, where he currently plays with OGM Ormanspor in Turkey. He has also been a member of The Nigeria national basketball team and represented them in the 2016 Olympic Games in Rio.

Ogide played in nine contests in the 2019–20 season with Assigeco Casalpusterlengo due to a knee injury. He signed with Cestistica San Severo on January 10, 2020. After averaging 18 points and 8 rebounds per game, Ogide re-signed with the team on July 5, 2020.

On July 1, 2021, he has signed with OGM Ormanspor of the TBL.
