= 2011–12 New Mexico Lobos men's basketball team =

American college basketball season

2011–12 New Mexico Lobos men's basketball

Mountain West regular season co-champions Mountain West tournament champions

NCAA Tournament, Third Round
- Conference: Mountain West Conference

Ranking
- Coaches: No. 23
- AP: No. 21
- Record: 28–7 (10–4 Mountain West)
- Head coach: Steve Alford (5th season)
- Assistant coaches: Craig Neal; Duane Broussard; Ryan Miller
- Home arena: The Pit (Capacity: 17,126)

2011–12 Mountain West Conference men's basketball standings
	Conf.				Overall
Team	W		L	PCT	W		L	PCT
No. 21 New Mexico †	10	–	4	.714	28	–	7	.800
No. 22 San Diego St	10	–	4	.714	26	–	8	.765
No. 23 UNLV	9	–	5	.643	26	–	9	.743
Colorado State	8	–	6	.571	20	–	12	.625
TCU	7	–	7	.500	18	–	15	.545
Wyoming	6	–	8	.429	21	–	12	.636
Air Force	3	–	11	.214	13	–	16	.448
Boise State	3	–	11	.214	13	–	17	.433
† 2012 MWC tournament winner As of March 8, 2012; Rankings from AP Poll

The 2011–12 New Mexico Lobos men's basketball team represented the University of New Mexico as a member of the Mountain West Conference. The Lobos are coached by fifth-year head coach Steve Alford and play their home games at The Pit in Albuquerque, New Mexico. They finished with a record of 28–7 overall, 10–4 in Mountain West play. They were co-champions of the 2012 Mountain West Regular Season Champions with San Diego State and won the 2012 Mountain West Conference men's basketball tournament. They earned a 5th seed in the west of the 2012 NCAA Division I men's basketball tournament. They lost in the third round to Louisville.

== Recruiting ==
College recruiting information
Name	Hometown	School	Height	Weight	Commit date
Dominique Dunning; SG	Corona, CA	Centennial High School	6 ft 4 in (1.93 m)	190 lb (86 kg)	Apr 13, 2010
Dominique Dunning; SG	Recruit ratings: Scout: Rivals: (90)				
Hugh Greenwood; SG	Hobart, Australia	Australian Institute of Sport	6 ft 3 in (1.91 m)	210 lb (95 kg)	Apr 13, 2011
Hugh Greenwood; SG	Recruit ratings: Scout: Rivals: (N/A)				
Overall recruit ranking: Scout: – Rivals: –
Note: In many cases, Scout, Rivals, 247Sports, On3, and ESPN may conflict in their listings of height and weight.; In these cases, the average was taken. ESPN grades are on a 100-point scale.; Sources: "New Mexico Commit List for 2011". Rivals.; "Men's Basketball Recruiting". Scout.; "ESPN – New Mexico Lobos Basketball Recruiting 2011". ESPN.; "Scout.com Team Recruiting Rankings". Scout.; "2011 Team Ranking". Rivals.

== Roster ==
2011–12 Roster
Name	Number	Pos.	Height	Weight	Year	Hometown	High School/Last College
A. J. Hardeman	00	F	6' 8"	235	Senior	Del Valle, Texas	Del Valle High School
Chris Perez	2	G	6' 0"	180	Sophomore	Corona, California	Centennial High School
Hugh Greenwood	3	G	6' 3"	209	Freshman	Hobart, Australia	Australian Institute of Sport
Chad Adams	4	G/F	6' 6"	190	Junior	Albuquerque, New Mexico	Highland High School
Dominique Dunning	5	G	6' 3"	198	Freshman	Corona, California	Centennial High School
Kendall Williams	10	G	6' 3"	180	Sophomore	Rancho Cucamonga, California	Los Osos High School
Jamal Fenton	13	G	5' 9"	168	Junior	Houston, Texas	Chávez High School
Tony Snell	21	G	6' 7"	195	Sophomore	Riverside, California	King High School
Phillip McDonald	23	G	6' 5"	200	Senior	Cypress, Texas	Cypress Springs High School
Kory Alford	24	G	6' 4"	170	Freshman	Albuquerque, New Mexico	La Cueva High School
Drew Gordon	32	F	6' 9"	245	Senior	San Jose, California	UCLA
Demetrius Walker	40	G	6' 2"	200	RS Sophomore	Fontana, California	Arizona State
Cameron Bairstow	41	F	6' 9"	253	Sophomore	Brisbane, Australia	Australian Institute of Sport
Alex Kirk	53	C	6' 11"	242	Sophomore	Los Alamos, New Mexico	Los Alamos High School

=== Departures ===
The Lobos lost their lone senior Dairese Gary, who was a four-year starter at point guard, who averaged 14.1 points per game, 5.5 assists per game and 3.2 rebounds per game. The Lobos also lost assistant coach Wyking Jones to an assistant coach position at the University of Louisville. Due to this, former Director of Basketball Operations Duane Broussard was promoted to assistant coach to replace Jones.

== 2011–12 Schedule ==
- All times are Mountain

Date time, TV	Rank^{#}	Opponent^{#}	Result	Record	Site (attendance) city, state
Exhibition
11/01/2011*; 7:00 pm, KASY		Davenport	W 92–54	–	The Pit (12,978); Albuquerque, NM
11/05/2011*; 7:00 pm, KASY		Western New Mexico	W 99–68	–	The Pit (13,473); Albuquerque, NM
Regular season
11/11/2011*; 7:00 pm, KASY		New Orleans	W 92–40	1–0	The Pit (14,011); Albuquerque, NM
11/16/2011*; 7:00 pm, The Mtn.		New Mexico State; Rio Grande Rivalry	L 53–62	1–1	The Pit (15,303); Albuquerque, NM
11/18/2011*; 6:30 pm, FSAZ		at Arizona State	W 76–71	2–1	Wells Fargo Arena (5,046); Tempe, AZ
11/24/2011*; 7:00 pm, ESPNU		vs. Santa Clara; 76 Classic Quarterfinals	L 76–79 ^{OT}	2–2	Anaheim Convention Center (N/A); Anaheim, CA
11/25/2011*; 7:30 pm, ESPNU		vs. Washington State; 76 Classic loser bracket	W 72–62	3–2	Anaheim Convention Center (N/A); Anaheim, CA
11/27/2011*; 2:00 pm, ESPNU		vs. Boston College; 76 Classic 5th place game	W 75–57	4–2	Anaheim Convention Center (N/A); Anaheim, CA
11/30/2011*; 7:00 pm		Idaho State	W 65–41	5–2	The Pit (13,142); Albuquerque, NM
12/03/2011*; 8:00 pm, The Mtn.		Missouri State; MWC-MVC Challenge	W 76–60	6–2	The Pit (14,077); Albuquerque, NM
12/10/2011*; 5:00 pm, FS West		at USC	W 44–41	7–2	Galen Center (3,863); Los Angeles, CA
12/17/2011*; 8:30 pm, ESPN2		vs. Oklahoma State; All-College Basketball Classic	W 66–56	8–2	Chesapeake Energy Arena (5,303); Oklahoma City, OK
12/20/2011*; 7:00 pm, KASY		Montana State	W 91–46	9–2	The Pit (13,462); Albuquerque, NM
12/22/2011*; 7:00 pm		UMKC	W 87–62	10–2	The Pit (13,419); Albuquerque, NM
12/28/2011*; 7:00 pm, AggieVision		at New Mexico State; Rio Grande Rivalry	W 89–69	11–2	Pan American Center (8,361); Las Cruces, NM
12/31/2011*; 4:00 pm, The Mtn.		Saint Louis	W 64–60	12–2	The Pit (15,139); Albuquerque, NM
01/03/2012*; 7:00 pm, KASY		Houston Baptist	W 98–61	13–2	The Pit (12,789); Albuquerque, NM
01/07/2012*; 1:30 pm, KASY		North Dakota	W 85–57	14–2	The Pit (14,094); Albuquerque, NM
01/14/2012; 1:30 pm, The Mtn.		at Wyoming	W 72–62	15–2 (1–0)	Arena-Auditorium (6,955); Laramie, WY
01/18/2012; 8:00 pm, CBSSN		No. 16 San Diego State	L 70–75	15–3 (1–1)	The Pit (15,411); Albuquerque, NM
01/21/2012; 8:00 pm, CBSSN		at No. 14 UNLV	L 63–80	15–4 (1–2)	Thomas & Mack Center (18,577); Paradise, NV
01/25/2012; 8:00 pm, CBSSN		Colorado State	W 85–52	16–4 (2–2)	The Pit (14,089); Albuquerque, NM
01/28/2012; 4:00 pm, The Mtn.		TCU	W 71–54	17–4 (3–2)	The Pit (15,212); Albuquerque, NM
01/31/2012; 8:00 pm, The Mtn.		at Air Force	W 81–42	18–4 (4–2)	Clune Arena (1,916); Colorado Springs, CO
02/04/2012; 2:00 pm, NBCSN		at Boise State	W 65–49	19–4 (5–2)	Taco Bell Arena (4,159); Boise, ID
02/11/2012; 1:30 pm, The Mtn.		Wyoming	W 48–38	20–4 (6–2)	The Pit (15,140); Albuquerque, NM
02/15/2012; 8:00 pm, CBSSN		at No. 13 San Diego State	W 77–67	21–4 (7–2)	Viejas Arena (12,414); San Diego, CA
02/18/2012; 11:00 am, CBS		No. 11 UNLV	W 65–45	22–4 (8–2)	The Pit (15,411); Albuquerque, NM
02/21/2012; 8:00 pm, The Mtn.	No. 18	at Colorado State	L 63–71	22–5 (8–3)	Moby Arena (4,444); Fort Collins, CO
02/25/2012; 5:00 pm, The Mtn.	No. 18	at TCU	L 64–83	22–6 (8–4)	Daniel–Meyer Coliseum (6,460); Fort Worth, TX
02/29/2012; 6:00 pm, The Mtn.		Air Force	W 86–56	23–6 (9–4)	The Pit (15,152); Albuquerque, NM
03/02/2012; 2:00 pm, NBCSN		Boise State	W 76–61	24–6 (10–4)	The Pit (15,411); Albuquerque, NM
2012 Mountain West Conference tournament
03/08/2012; 7:00 pm, The Mtn.	(2)	vs. (7) Air Force; Quarterfinals	W 79–64	25–6	Thomas & Mack Center (13,772); Paradise, NV
03/09/2012; 9:30 pm, CBSSN	(2)	vs. (3) No. 20 UNLV; Semifinals	W 72–67	26–6	Thomas & Mack Center (16,339); Paradise, NV
03/10/2012; 5:00 pm, NBCSN	(2)	vs. (1) No. 18 San Diego State; Championship Game	W 68–59	27–6	Thomas & Mack Center (12,168); Paradise, NV
2012 NCAA tournament
03/15/2012*; 2:10 pm, TBS	(5 W) No. 21	vs. (12 W) Long Beach State; Second Round	W 75–68	28–6	Rose Garden (17,519); Portland, OR
03/17/2012*; 7:40 pm, TBS	(5 W) No. 21	vs. (4 W) No. 17 Louisville; Third Round	L 56–59	28–7	Rose Garden (18,167); Portland, OR
*Non-conference game. ^{#}Rankings from AP Poll. (#) Tournament seedings in parentheses. All times are in Mountain Time (#) during NCAA Tournament is seed with Region.
