= 2011–12 UNLV Runnin' Rebels basketball team =

American college basketball season

2011–12 UNLV Runnin' Rebels men's basketball

Las Vegas Invitational Champions

NCAA Tournament, second round
- Conference: Mountain West Conference

Ranking
- AP: No. 23
- Record: 26–9 (9–5 Mountain West)
- Head coach: Dave Rice
- Assistant coaches: Justin Hutson (1st season); Stacey Augmon; Heath Schroyer
- Home arena: Thomas & Mack Center

2011–12 Mountain West Conference men's basketball standings
	Conf.				Overall
Team	W		L	PCT	W		L	PCT
No. 21 New Mexico †	10	–	4	.714	28	–	7	.800
No. 22 San Diego St	10	–	4	.714	26	–	8	.765
No. 23 UNLV	9	–	5	.643	26	–	9	.743
Colorado State	8	–	6	.571	20	–	12	.625
TCU	7	–	7	.500	18	–	15	.545
Wyoming	6	–	8	.429	21	–	12	.636
Air Force	3	–	11	.214	13	–	16	.448
Boise State	3	–	11	.214	13	–	17	.433
† 2012 MWC tournament winner As of March 8, 2012; Rankings from AP Poll

The 2011–12 UNLV Runnin' Rebels men's basketball team represented the University of Nevada, Las Vegas. The team was coached by Dave Rice, in his first year with the Runnin' Rebels. They played their home games at the Thomas & Mack Center on UNLV's main campus in Las Vegas, Nevada and are a member of the Mountain West Conference. UNLV's season ended with 26–9 overall, and 9–5 in MWC Play, placing third. They lost in the semifinals of the Mountain West Basketball tournament to New Mexico. They received an at-large bid to the 2012 NCAA tournament where they lost in the second round to Colorado.

== Roster ==
#	Name	Height	Weight (lbs.)	Position	Class	Hometown	Previous school
0	Oscar Bellfield	6'2"	190	G	Sr.	Los Angeles, CA	Westchester HS
1	Quintrell Thomas	6'8"	245	F	RS Jr.	Newark, NJ	Kansas
2	Kendall Wallace	6'4"	195	G	RS Sr.	Mesa, AZ	Mountain View HS
3	Anthony Marshall	6'3"	200	G	Jr.	Las Vegas, NV	Mojave HS
5	Reggie Smith	6'0"	185	G	RS So.	Chicago, IL	Marquette
11	Carlos Lopez	6'11"	215	F	So.	Lajas, Puerto Rico	Findlay Prep
12	Brice Massamba	6'10"	245	F/C	Sr.	Södertälje, Sweden	Findlay Prep
14	Bryan Glenn	6'11"	215	C	Fr.	Las Vegas, NV	Coronado HS
15	Bryce Jones	6'5"	200	G	So.	Los Angeles, CA	USC
20	Karam Mashour	6'6"	210	G/F	So.	Nazareth, Israel	St. Joseph
22	Chase Stanback	6'8"	215	G/F	RS Sr.	Los Angeles, CA	UCLA
24	Barry Cheaney	6'1"	160	G	Fr.	Corona, CA	Los Osos HS
31	Justin Hawkins	6'3"	190	G	Jr.	Los Angeles, CA	Taft HS
33	Wade Norman	6'4"	170	G	Fr.	Las Vegas, NV	Faith Lutheran HS
43	Mike Moser	6'8"	210	F	So.	Portland, OR	UCLA

== Rankings ==
Ranking movements Legend: ██ Increase in ranking ██ Decrease in ranking RV = Received votes
	Week																				
Poll	Pre	1	2	3	4	5	6	7	8	9	10	11	12	13	14	15	16	17	18	19	Final
AP	RV	RV	RV	RV	18	RV	RV	21	19	17	12	14	12	11	14	11	21	17	20	23	Not released
Coaches	RV	RV	RV	RV	20	RV	RV	23	20	17	12	20	15	13	16	11	20	17	20	25	RV

*AP does not release post-NCAA Tournament rankings.

== Schedule and results ==
Date time, TV	Rank^{#}	Opponent^{#}	Result	Record	Site (attendance) city, state
Exhibition
11/01/2011*; 7:00 pm		Washburn	W 58–50	–	Thomas & Mack Center (9,619); Paradise, NV
Regular season
11/11/2011*; 7:00 pm		Grand Canyon	W 83–66	1–0	Thomas & Mack Center (13,763); Paradise, NV
11/14/2011*; 7:00 pm, CBSSN		Nevada	W 71–67	2–0	Thomas & Mack Center (14,827); Paradise, NV
11/17/2011*; 7:00 pm		Canisus	W 95–70	3–0	Thomas & Mack Center (10,663); Paradise, NV
11/20/2011*; 7:00 pm		Morgan State; Las Vegas Invitational	W 92–55	4–0	Thomas & Mack Center (10,782); Paradise, NV
11/22/2011*; 7:30 pm		Cal Poly; Las Vegas Invitational	W 75–52	5–0	Thomas & Mack Center (12,061); Paradise, NV
11/25/2011*; 5:00 pm, ESPN3		vs. USC; Las Vegas Invitational semifinals	W 66–55	6–0	Orleans Arena (7,200); Paradise, NV
11/26/2011*; 7:30 pm, ESPN2		vs. No. 1 North Carolina; Las Vegas Invitational championship	W 90–80	7–0	Orleans Arena (7,523); Paradise, NV
11/30/2011*; 7:00 pm	No. 18	at UC Santa Barbara	W 94–88 ^{2OT}	8–0	The Thunderdome (5,516); Santa Barbara, CA
12/04/2011*; 1:00 pm, Cox 96	No. 18	at Wichita State; MWC-MVC Challenge	L 70–89	8–1	Charles Koch Arena (10,466); Wichita, KS
12/07/2011*; 7:00 pm		Cal State San Marcos	W 94–50	9–1	Orleans Arena (5,938); Paradise, NV
12/10/2011*; 11:00 am, BTN		at No. 14 Wisconsin	L 51–62	9–2	Kohl Center (17,123); Madison, WI
12/14/2011*; 7:00 pm, The Mtn.		UTEP	W 65–54	10–2	Thomas & Mack Center (11,805); Paradise, NV
12/17/2011*; 2:00 pm, BTN		vs. No. 19 Illinois	W 64–48	11–2	United Center (15,144); Chicago, IL
12/19/2011*; 7:00 pm	No. 21	Louisiana-Monroe	W 81–63	12–2	Thomas & Mack Center (11,515); Paradise, NV
12/23/2011*; 2:00 pm, CBSSN	No. 21	California	W 85–68	13–2	Thomas & Mack Center (15,188); Paradise, NV
12/28/2011*; 7:00 pm	No. 19	Central Arkansas	W 124–75	14–2	Thomas & Mack Center (14,401); Paradise, NV
12/31/2011*; 5:00 pm, KLAS	No. 19	at Hawaiʻi	W 74–69	15–2	Stan Sheriff Center (6,726); Honolulu, HI
01/05/2012*; 7:00 pm	No. 17	at Cal State Bakersfield	W 89–57	16–2	Rabobank Arena (3,325); Bakersfield, CA
01/14/2012; 1:00 pm, NBCSN	No. 12	at No. 22 San Diego State	L 67–69	16–3 (0–1)	Viejas Arena (12,414); San Diego, CA
01/18/2012; 7:30 pm, The Mtn.	No. 14	TCU	W 101–78	17–3 (1–1)	Thomas & Mack Center (14,126); Paradise, NV
01/21/2012; 7:00 pm, CBSSN	No. 14	New Mexico	W 80–63	18–3 (2–1)	Thomas & Mack Center (18,577); Paradise, NV
01/25/2012; 7:00 pm, The Mtn.	No. 12	at Boise State	W 77–72 ^{OT}	19–3 (3–1)	Taco Bell Arena (6,024); Boise, ID
01/28/2012; 6:00 pm, The Mtn.	No. 12	at Air Force	W 65–63 ^{OT}	20–3 (4–1)	Clune Arena (4,170); Colorado Springs, CO
02/01/2012; 7:30 pm, The Mtn.	No. 11	Colorado State	W 82–63	21–3 (5–1)	Thomas & Mack Center (15,053); Paradise, NV
02/04/2012; 1:00 pm, The Mtn.	No. 11	at Wyoming	L 66–68	21–4 (5–2)	Arena-Auditorium (7,179); Laramie, WY
02/11/2012; 1:00 pm, NBCSN	No. 14	No. 13 San Diego State	W 65–63	22–4 (6–2)	Thomas & Mack Center (18,577); Paradise, NV
02/14/2012; 4:30 pm, The Mtn.	No. 11	at TCU	L 97–102 ^{OT}	22–5 (6–3)	Daniel-Meyer Coliseum (4,710); Fort Worth, TX
02/18/2012; 10:00 am, CBS	No. 11	at New Mexico	L 45–65	22–6 (6–4)	The Pit (15,411); Albuquerque, NM
02/22/2012; 7:00 pm, CBSSN	No. 21	Boise State	W 75–58	23–6 (7–4)	Thomas & Mack Center (14,409); Paradise, NV
02/25/2012; 1:00 pm, NBCSN	No. 21	Air Force	W 68–58	24–6 (8–4)	Thomas & Mack Center (16,036); Paradise, NV
02/29/2012; 7:00 pm, CBSSN	No. 17	at Colorado State	L 59–66	24–7 (8–5)	Moby Arena (8,371); Fort Collins, CO
03/03/2012; 7:00 pm, The Mtn.	No. 17	Wyoming	W 74–63	25–7 (9–5)	Thomas & Mack Center (18,577); Paradise, NV
2012 Mountain West Conference men's basketball tournament
03/08/2012; 8:30 pm, The Mtn.	(3) No. 20	vs. (6) Wyoming; Quarterfinals	W 56–48	26–7	Thomas & Mack Center (13,772); Paradise, NV
03/08/2012; 8:30 pm, CBSSN	(3) No. 20	vs. (2) New Mexico; Semifinals	L 67–72	26–8	Thomas & Mack Center (16,339); Paradise, NV
2012 NCAA tournament
03/15/2012*; 6:57 pm, truTV	(6 S) No. 23	vs. (11 S) Colorado; Second Round	L 64–68	26–9	The Pit (15,674); Albuquerque, NM
*Non-conference game. ^{#}Rankings from AP Poll. (#) Tournament seedings in parentheses. All times are in Pacific Time. (#) during NCAA Tournament is seed with Region.
