= 2011–12 San Diego State Aztecs men's basketball team =

American college basketball season

2011–12 San Diego State Aztecs men's basketball
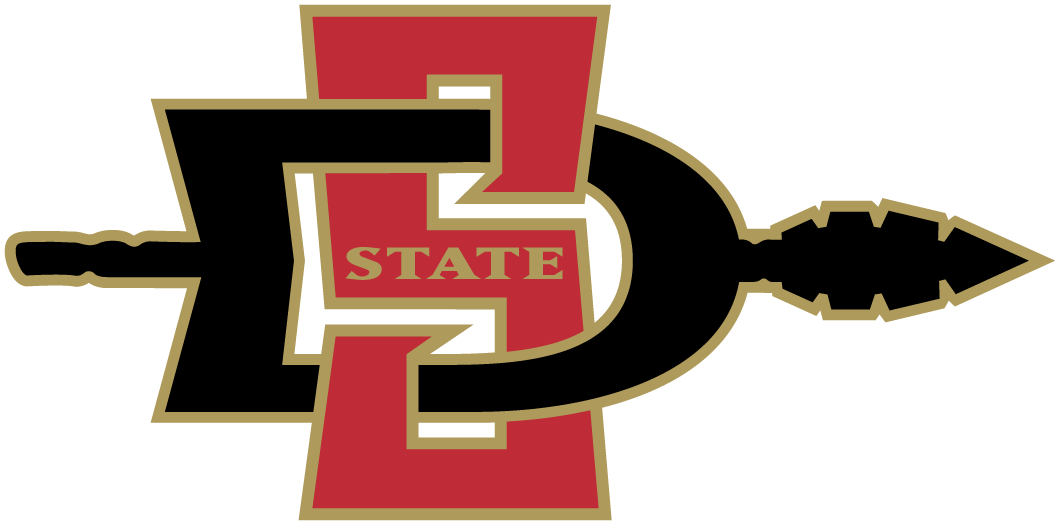

Mountain West Regular Season Co-Champions

NCAA Tournament, Round of 64
- Conference: Mountain West Conference

Ranking
- AP: No. 22
- Record: 26–8 (10–4 Mountain West)
- Head coach: Steve Fisher
- Assistant coaches: Brian Dutcher; Mark Fisher; Tony Bland
- Home arena: Viejas Arena

2011–12 Mountain West Conference men's basketball standings
	Conf.				Overall
Team	W		L	PCT	W		L	PCT
No. 21 New Mexico †	10	–	4	.714	28	–	7	.800
No. 22 San Diego St	10	–	4	.714	26	–	8	.765
No. 23 UNLV	9	–	5	.643	26	–	9	.743
Colorado State	8	–	6	.571	20	–	12	.625
TCU	7	–	7	.500	18	–	15	.545
Wyoming	6	–	8	.429	21	–	12	.636
Air Force	3	–	11	.214	13	–	16	.448
Boise State	3	–	11	.214	13	–	17	.433
† 2012 MWC tournament winner As of March 8, 2012; Rankings from AP Poll

The 2011–12 San Diego State men's basketball team represented San Diego State University in the 2011–12 college basketball season. It was their 13th season in the Mountain West Conference. This was head coach Steve Fisher's thirteenth season at San Diego State. The Aztecs played their home games at Viejas Arena. They finished with a record of 26–8 overall and 10–4 in Mountain West play to be co-champions of the Mountain West with New Mexico. They lost in the championship game of the Mountain West Basketball tournament to New Mexico. They received an at-large bid into the 2012 NCAA tournament, earning the 6 seed in the Midwest which they lost to North Carolina State in the second round.

== Off Season ==
=== Departures ===
Name	Number	Pos.	Height	Weight	Year	Hometown	Notes
Brian Carlwell	5	C	6'11"	300	Senior	Maywood, Illinois	Graduated
Mehdi Cheriet	42	F	6'9"	225	Senior	Tarare, France	Graduated
D.J. Gay	23	G	6'0"	170	Senior	Sun Valley, California	Graduated
Malcolm Thomas	4	F	6'9"	220	Senior	San Diego, California	Graduated
Billy White	32	F	6'8"	235	Senior	Las Vegas, Nevada	Graduated
Kawhi Leonard	15	F	6'7"	225	Sophomore	Riverside, California	Declared for the 2011 NBA draft

=== Incoming transfers ===
Name	Number	Pos.	Height	Weight	Year	Hometown	Notes
J.J. O' Brien	20	F	6'7"	215	Sophomore	Rancho Cucamonga, California	Elected to transfer from Utah. O' Brien will redshirt for the 2011-12 season, under NCAA transfer rules. Will have three years of eligibility.
Dwayne Polee ll	20	F	6'7"	195	Sophomore	Los Angeles, California	Elected to transfer from St. John's. Polee ll will redshirt for the 2011-12 season, under NCAA transfer rules. Will have three years of eligibility.

=== 2011 Recruiting Class ===
College recruiting information
Name	Hometown	School	Height	Weight	Commit date
Deshawn Stephens; PF	Los Angeles, CA	Santa Monica College	6 ft 8 in (2.03 m)	215 lb (98 kg)	Oct 19, 2010
Deshawn Stephens; PF	Recruit ratings: Scout: Rivals: (JC)				
Overall recruit ranking:
Note: In many cases, Scout, Rivals, 247Sports, On3, and ESPN may conflict in their listings of height and weight.; In these cases, the average was taken. ESPN grades are on a 100-point scale.; Sources: "2011 Team Ranking". Rivals.

== Roster ==
#	Name	Height	Weight (lbs.)	Position	Class	Hometown	Previous Team(s)
0	Alec Williams	6'6"	245	F	Jr.	San Juan Capistrano, CA	JSerra HS
2	Xavier Thames	6'3"	185	G	RS So.	Sacramento, CA	Washington State
3	LaBradford Franklin	6'2"	170	G	So.	Temecula, CA	Great Oak High School
5	Garrett Green	6'11"	230	F	Sr.	Woodland Hills, CA	LSU
10	Tim Shelton	6'7"	245	F	Sr.	Fresno, CA	Clovis West HS
11	James Rahon	6'5"	205	G	RS Jr.	San Diego, CA	Santa Clara
20	J.J. O'Brien	6'7"	215	F	So.	Ranco Cucamonga, CA	Utah
21	Jamaal Franklin	6'5"	185	G	So.	Sacramento, CA	Westwind Prep
22	Chase Tapley	6'2"	200	G	Jr.	Sacramento, CA	Sacramento HS
23	Deshawn Stephens	6'8"	215	F	Jr.	Los Angeles, CA	Santa Monica College
24	Dwayne Polee II	6'7"	193	F	So.	Los Angeles, CA	St. John's

== Schedule and results ==
- All times are Pacific

Date time, TV	Rank^{#}	Opponent^{#}	Result	Record	Site (attendance) city, state
Exhibition
11/02/2011*; 7:00 pm		Cal State San Marcos	W 78–63	–	Viejas Arena (11,711); San Diego, CA
11/07/2011*; 7:30 pm		Point Loma Nazarene	W 78–53	–	Viejas Arena (11,613); San Diego, CA
Regular season
11/11/2011*; 7:30 pm		Bryant; Basketball Travelers Classic	W 75–63	1–0	Viejas Arena (11,734); San Diego, CA
11/12/2011*; 7:30 pm		Southern Utah; Basketball Travelers Classic	W 70–37	2–0	Viejas Arena (11,765); San Diego, CA
11/13/2011*; 3:00 pm		UC Davis; Basketball Travelers Classic	W 89–74	3–0	Viejas Arena (11,792); San Diego, CA
11/15/2011*; 11:00 am, ESPN		at No. 12 Baylor	L 67–77	3–1	Ferrell Center (6,941); Waco, TX
11/17/2011*; 7:00 pm, The Mtn.		USC	W 56–54	4–1	Viejas Arena (12,414); San Diego, CA
11/19/2011*; 1:30 pm, 4SD		Long Beach State	W 77–73 ^{OT}	5–1	Viejas Arena (12,094); San Diego, CA
11/23/2011*; 5:30 pm, FSAZ+		at No. 23 Arizona	W 61–57	6–1	McKale Center (13,761); Tucson, AZ
11/26/2011*; 7:00 pm		at UC Santa Barbara	W 76–75 ^{OT}	7–1	The Thunderdome (5,011); Santa Barbara, CA
11/30/2011*; 7:30 pm, The Mtn.		Creighton; MWC–MVC Challenge	L 83–85	7–2	Viejas Arena (12,414); San Diego, CA
12/04/2011*; 2:00 pm, The Mtn.		No. 24 California	W 64–63	8–2	Viejas Arena (12,414); San Diego, CA
12/07/2011*; 7:00 pm, 4SD		at San Diego; City Championship	W 74–62	9–2	Jenny Craig Pavilion (4,708); San Diego, CA
12/19/2011*; 7:00 pm, 4SD		UC Riverside	W 80–55	10–2	Viejas Arena (11,555); San Diego, CA
12/22/2011*; 4:30 pm		Elon	W 81–55	11–2	Viejas Arena (11,370); San Diego, CA
12/30/2011*; 7:00 pm	No. 25	Redlands	W 95–43	12–2	Viejas Arena (12,414); San Diego, CA
01/05/2012*; 7:00 pm	No. 24	San Diego Christian	W 83–52	13–2	Viejas Arena (10,857); San Diego, CA
01/10/2012*; 7:00 pm, 4SD	No. 22	Chicago State	W 73–65	14–2	Viejas Arena (12,099); San Diego, CA
01/14/2012; 1:00 pm, NBCSN	No. 22	No. 12 UNLV	W 69–67	15–2 (1–0)	Viejas Arena (12,414); San Diego, CA
01/18/2012; 7:00 pm, CBSSN	No. 16	at New Mexico	W 75–70	16–2 (2–0)	The Pit (15,411); Albuquerque, NM
01/21/2012; 7:00 pm, The Mtn.	No. 16	Air Force	W 57–44	17–2 (3–0)	Viejas Arena (12,414); San Diego, CA
01/24/2012; 5:30 pm, The Mtn.	No. 13	at Wyoming	W 52–42	18–2 (4–0)	Arena-Auditorium (5,692); Laramie, WY
01/28/2012; 1:00 pm, NBCSN	No. 13	at Colorado State	L 60–77	18–3 (4–1)	Moby Arena (6,038); Fort Collins, CO
02/01/2012; 7:00 pm, CBSSN	No. 17	Boise State	W 58–56	19–3 (5–1)	Viejas Arena (12,414); San Diego, CA
02/04/2012; 7:00 pm, The Mtn.	No. 17	TCU	W 83–73	20–3 (6–1)	Viejas Arena (12,414); San Diego, CA
02/11/2012; 1:00 pm, NBCSN	No. 13	at No. 14 UNLV	L 63–65	20–4 (6–2)	Thomas & Mack Center (18,577); Paradise, NV
02/14/2012; 7:00 pm, CBSSN	No. 13	New Mexico	L 67–77	20–5 (6–3)	Viejas Arena (12,414); San Diego, CA
02/18/2012; 1:00 pm, NBCSN	No. 13	at Air Force	L 56–58	20–6 (6–4)	Clune Arena (2,483); Colorado Springs, CO
02/22/2012; 7:30 pm, The Mtn.	No. 24	Wyoming	W 67–58 ^{OT}	21–6 (7–4)	Viejas Arena (12,414); San Diego, CA
02/25/2012; 7:00 pm, The Mtn.	No. 24	Colorado State	W 74–66	22–6 (8–4)	Viejas Arena (12,414); San Diego, CA
02/29/2012; 7:00 pm, The Mtn.	No. 21	at Boise State	W 66–53	23–6 (9–4)	Taco Bell Arena (6,145); Boise, ID
03/03/2012; 4:00 pm, The Mtn.	No. 21	at TCU	W 98–92 ^{OT}	24–6 (10–4)	Daniel-Meyer Coliseum (5,955); Fort Worth, TX
2012 Mountain West Conference men's basketball tournament
03/08/2012; 12:00 pm, The Mtn.	(1) No. 18	vs. (8) Boise State; Quarterfinals	W 65–62	25–6	Thomas & Mack Center (8,601); Paradise, NV
03/09/2012; 6:00 pm, CBSSN	(1) No. 18	vs. (4) Colorado State; Semifinals	W 79–69	26–6	Thomas & Mack Center (16,339); Paradise, NV
03/10/2012; 4:00 pm, NBCSN	(1) No. 18	vs. (2) New Mexico; Championship Game	L 59–68	26–7	Thomas & Mack Center (12,168); Paradise, NV
2012 NCAA tournament
03/16/2012*; 9:40 am, truTV	(6 W) No. 22	vs. (11 W) NC State; Second Round	L 65–79	26–8	Nationwide Arena (17,030); Columbus, OH
*Non-conference game. ^{#}Rankings from AP Poll. (#) Tournament seedings in parentheses. All times are in Pacific Time Zone.

== Rankings ==
Ranking movements Legend: ██ Increase in ranking ██ Decrease in ranking — = Not ranked RV = Received votes
	Week																			
Poll	Pre	1	2	3	4	5	6	7	8	9	10	11	12	13	14	15	16	17	18	Final
AP	RV	RV	RV	RV	RV	RV	RV	25	24	22	16	13	17	13	13	24	21	18	22	Not released
Coaches	—	—	RV	RV	RV	RV	RV	RV	25	22	16	12	17	14	15	25	23	21	23	RV

*AP does not release post-NCAA Tournament rankings.
