= 2012 CAA men's basketball tournament =

- Classification: Division I
- Season: 2011–12
- Teams: 12
- Site: Richmond Coliseum; Richmond, VA
- Champions: VCU (5th title)
- Winning coach: Shaka Smart (1st title)
- Attendance: 47,833
- Television: Comcast SportsNet; ESPN

The 2012 Colonial Athletic Association men's basketball tournament was held March 2–5 at the Richmond Coliseum in Richmond, VA to crown a champion of the Colonial Athletic Association. The tournament winner, Virginia Commonwealth University, received an automatic bid to the 2012 NCAA tournament

== Seeding ==
2011–12 CAA men's basketball standings
| | Conf. | | | | Overall |
| Team | W | | L | PCT | W | | L | PCT |
|---|---|---|---|---|---|---|---|---|
| Drexel | 16 | – | 2 | .889 | 29 | – | 7 | .806 |
| VCU† | 15 | – | 3 | .833 | 29 | – | 7 | .806 |
| George Mason | 14 | – | 4 | .778 | 24 | – | 9 | .727 |
| Old Dominion | 13 | – | 5 | .722 | 21 | – | 13 | .618 |
| Delaware | 12 | – | 6 | .667 | 18 | – | 14 | .563 |
| Georgia State | 11 | – | 7 | .611 | 22 | – | 11 | .667 |
| Northeastern | 9 | – | 9 | .500 | 14 | – | 17 | .452 |
| James Madison | 5 | – | 13 | .278 | 12 | – | 20 | .375 |
| UNCW | 5 | – | 13 | .278 | 10 | – | 21 | .323 |
| William & Mary | 4 | – | 14 | .222 | 6 | – | 26 | .188 |
| Hofstra | 3 | – | 15 | .167 | 10 | – | 22 | .313 |
| Towson | 1 | – | 17 | .056 | 1 | – | 31 | .031 |
† 2012 CAA tournament winner Rankings from AP poll

2012 CAA Men's Basketball Tournament seeds
| Seed | School | Conf. | Over. | Tiebreaker |
| 1^{†‡} | Drexel | 16–2 | 26–5 | |
| 2^{†} | VCU | 15–3 | 26–6 | |
| 3^{†} | George Mason | 14–4 | 24–8 | |
| 4^{†} | Old Dominion | 13–5 | 20–12 | |
| 5 | Delaware | 12–6 | 18–13 | |
| 6 | Georgia State | 11–7 | 21–11 | |
| 7 | Northeastern | 9–9 | 14–17 | |
| 8 | James Madison | 5–13 | 12–20 | 1–0 vs UNCW |
| 9 | UNC Wilmington | 5–13 | 10–21 | 0–1 vs JMU |
| 10 | William & Mary | 4–14 | 6–26 | |
| 11 | Hofstra | 3–15 | 10–22 | |
| 12 | Towson | 1–17 | 1–31 | |
‡ – CAA regular season champions. † – Received a bye in the conference tournament. Overall records are as of the end of the regular season.

== Schedule ==
| Session | Game | Time* | Matchup^{#} | Television | Attendance |
First Round – Friday, March 2
| 1 | 1 | 12:00 PM | #8 UNCW vs. #9 James Madison | Comcast Network | |
| 1 | 2 | 2:30 PM | #5 Delaware vs. #12 Towson | Comcast Network | |
| 2 | 3 | 6:00 PM | #7 Northeastern vs. #10 William & Mary | Comcast Network | |
| 2 | 4 | 8:30 PM | #6 Georgia State vs. #11 Hofstra | Comcast Network | |
Quarterfinals – Saturday, March 3
| 3 | 5 | 12:00 PM | #1 Drexel vs. #8 UNCW | Comcast Network | 5,889 |
| 3 | 6 | 2:30 PM | #4 Old Dominion vs. #5 Delaware | Comcast Network | 5,889 |
| 4 | 7 | 6:00 PM | #2 VCU vs. #7 Northeastern | Comcast Network | 11,200 |
| 4 | 8 | 8:30 PM | #3 George Mason vs. #6 Georgia State | Comcast Network | 11,200 |
Semifinals – Sunday, March 4
| 5 | 9 | 2:00 PM | #1 Drexel vs. #4 Old Dominion | Comcast Network | 11,200 |
| 5 | 10 | 4:30 PM | #2 VCU vs. #3 George Mason | Comcast Network and ESPN3 | 11,200 |
Championship Game – Monday, March 5
| 6 | 11 | 7:00 PM | #1 Drexel vs. #2 VCU | ESPN | 11,200 |
*Game Times in ET . #-Rankings denote tournament seeding.

== Bracket ==
First round Friday, March 2, 2012
8 | James Madison | 59
9 | UNC Wilmington | 70
5 | Delaware | 72
12 | Towson | 65
7 | Northeastern | 57
10 | William & Mary | 49
6 | Georgia State | 85
11 | Hofstra | 50

Quarterfinals; Saturday, March 3, 2012
1 | Drexel | 59
9 | UNC Wilmington | 47
4 | Old Dominion | 88
5 | Delaware | 74
2 | VCU | 75
7 | Northeastern | 65
3 | George Mason | 61
6 | Georgia State | 59

Semifinals; Sunday, March 4, 2012
1 | Drexel | 68
4 | Old Dominion | 51
2 | VCU | 74
3 | George Mason | 64

Championship Game; Monday, March 5, 2012
1 | Drexel | 56
2 | VCU | 59

== Honors ==
| CAA All-Tournament Team | Player | School | Position | Year |
|---|---|---|---|---|
| CAA All-Tournament Team | Darius Theus | VCU | G | Junior |
| CAA All-Tournament Team | Damion Lee | Drexel | G | Freshman |
| CAA All-Tournament Team | Frantz Massenat | Drexel | G | Sophomore |
| CAA All-Tournament Team | Bradford Burgess | VCU | G | Senior |
| CAA All-Tournament Team | Mike Morrison | George Mason | F | Senior |
| CAA All-Tournament Team | Rob Brandenberg | VCU | G | Sophomore |

== See also ==
- Colonial Athletic Association
