= 2011–12 Old Dominion Monarchs basketball team =

American college basketball season

2011–12 Old Dominion Monarchs basketball

CIT, Quarterfinals
- Conference: Colonial Athletic Association
- Record: 22–14 (13–5 CAA)
- Head coach: Blaine Taylor (11th season)
- Assistant coaches: Jim Corrigan; Robert Wilkes; Lonnie Blos
- Home arena: Ted Constant Convocation Center; Norfolk Scope Arena (alternate)

2011–12 CAA men's basketball standings
	Conf.				Overall
Team	W		L	PCT	W		L	PCT
Drexel	16	–	2	.889	29	–	7	.806
VCU†	15	–	3	.833	29	–	7	.806
George Mason	14	–	4	.778	24	–	9	.727
Old Dominion	13	–	5	.722	21	–	13	.618
Delaware	12	–	6	.667	18	–	14	.563
Georgia State	11	–	7	.611	22	–	11	.667
Northeastern	9	–	9	.500	14	–	17	.452
James Madison	5	–	13	.278	12	–	20	.375
UNCW	5	–	13	.278	10	–	21	.323
William & Mary	4	–	14	.222	6	–	26	.188
Hofstra	3	–	15	.167	10	–	22	.313
Towson	1	–	17	.056	1	–	31	.031
† 2012 CAA tournament winner Rankings from AP poll

The 2011–12 Old Dominion Monarchs basketball team represented Old Dominion University during the 2011–12 NCAA Division I men's basketball season. The Monarchs, led by 11th year head coach Blaine Taylor, played their home games at Ted Constant Convocation Center, with one home game during the CIT at Norfolk Scope Arena, and are members of the Colonial Athletic Association.

They finished the season 22–14, 13–5 in CAA play to finish in fourth place. They lost in the semifinals of the CAA Basketball tournament to Drexel. They were invited the 2012 CollegeInsider.com Tournament where they defeated Coastal Carolina in the first round and USC Upstate in the second round before falling in the quarterfinals to Mercer.

== Roster ==
Number	Name	Position	Height	Weight	Year	Hometown
00	Jason Pimentel	Forward	6–8	230	Freshman	Ocala, Florida
1	Nick Wright	Forward	6–8	208	Junior	Suffolk, Virginia
2	Shquan Rogers	Guard	6–2	190	Freshman	Norfolk, Virginia
4	Dimitri Batten	Guard	6–3	190	Freshman	Newport News, Virginia
10	Breon Key	Guard	6–2	175	Freshman	Hampton, Virginia
12	Donte Hill	Guard	6–4	205	Sophomore	Virginia Beach, Virginia
15	Trian Iliadis	Guard	6–3	185	Senior	Perth, Australia
20	Chris Cooper	Forward	6–9	230	Senior	Dumfries, Virginia
22	Marquel De Lancey	Guard	6–0	190	Senior	Alexandria, Virginia
23	Richard Ross	Forward	6–7	205	Freshman	Wichita Falls, Texas
24	Kent Bazemore	Guard/Forward	6–5	195	Senior	Kelford, North Carolina
40	Anton Larsen	Forward/Center	7–0	240	Sophomore	Copenhagen, Denmark

== Schedule ==
Date time, TV	Rank^{#}	Opponent^{#}	Result	Record	Site (attendance) city, state
Exhibition
11/01/2011*; 7:00 pm		Barton	W 79–68		Ted Constant Convocation Center (6,552); Norfolk, Virginia
11/04/2011*; 7:00 pm		Elizabeth City State	W 69–43		Ted Constant Convocation Center (7,072); Norfolk, Virginia
Regular season
11/12/2011*; 7:00 pm		Northern Iowa	L 46–63	0–1	Ted Constant Convocation Center (7,804); Norfolk, Virginia
11/14/2011*; 7:00 pm		Long Island; Basketball Hall of Fame Tip-Off	W 77–69	1–1	Ted Constant Convocation Center (6,624); Norfolk, Virginia
11/16/2011*; 7:00 pm		Howard	W 53–43	2–1	Ted Constant Convocation Center (7,358); Norfolk, Virginia
11/19/2011*; 2:00 pm		vs. South Florida; Basketball Hall of Fame Tip-Off	W 68–66 ^{OT}	3–1	Mohegan Sun Arena (NA); Uncasville, Connecticut
11/20/2011*; 12:00 pm, ESPNU		vs. No. 2 Kentucky; Basketball Hall of Fame Tip-Off	L 52–62	3–2	Mohegan Sun Arena (NA); Uncasville, Connecticut
11/23/2011*; 7:00 pm		Vermont	L 63–65 ^{OT}	3–3	Ted Constant Convocation Center (6,902); Norfolk, Virginia
11/29/2011*; 7:00 pm		East Carolina	W 63–58	4–3	Ted Constant Convocation Center (7,295); Norfolk, Virginia
12/03/2011; 1:00 pm		at Northeastern	W 69–59	5–3 (1–0)	Matthews Arena (1,347); Boston
12/09/2011*; 9:30 pm, SNY		vs. Fairfield	L 51–59	5–4	MassMutual Center (4,412); Springfield, Massachusetts
12/17/2011*; 5:00 pm		at Central Florida	L 53–61	5–5	UCF Arena (4,621); Orlando, Florida
12/20/2011*; 7:00 pm		at Richmond	L 82–90 ^{OT}	5–6	Robins Center (6,239); Richmond, Virginia
12/22/2011*; 7:00 pm		VMI	W 81–73	6–6	Ted Constant Convocation Center (7,886); Norfolk, Virginia
12/30/2011*; 7:00 pm, ESPNU		No. 8 Missouri	L 68–75	6–7	Ted Constant Convocation Center (8,460); Norfolk, Virginia
01/02/2012; 3:00 pm, ESPN3		at James Madison; Rivalry	W 67–61 ^{OT}	7–7 (2–0)	JMU Convocation Center (3,815); Harrisonburg, Virginia
01/05/2012; 8:00 pm, CSN		George Mason	L 54–63	7–8 (2–1)	Ted Constant Convocation Center (7,783); Norfolk, Virginia
01/07/2012; 7:00 pm		Towson	W 75–38	8–8 (3–1)	Ted Constant Convocation Center (7,048); Norfolk, Virginia
01/11/2012; 7:00 pm		at Delaware	W 68–66 ^{OT}	9–8 (4–1)	Bob Carpenter Center (1,911); Newark, Delaware
01/14/2012; 12:00 pm, MSG		Hofstra	W 69–61	10–8 (5–1)	Ted Constant Convocation Center (7,235); Norfolk, Virginia
01/18/2012; 7:00 pm		at Towson	W 71–41	11–8 (6–1)	Towson Center (689); Towson, Maryland
01/21/2012; 8:00 pm, CSN		at VCU; Rivalry	L 48–61	11–9 (6–2)	Stuart C. Siegel Center (7,617); Richmond, Virginia
01/23/2012; 7:00 pm		Northeastern	W 69–57	12–9 (7–2)	Ted Constant Convocation Center (7,287); Norfolk, Virginia
01/25/2012; 7:00 pm		at UNC Wilmington	W 53–48	13–9 (8–2)	Trask Coliseum (3,413); Wilmington, North Carolina
01/28/2012; 4:00 pm, CSN		William & Mary; Rivalry	W 68–44	14–9 (9–2)	Ted Constant Convocation Center (8,460); Norfolk, Virginia
02/02/2012; 7:00 pm, CSN		James Madison; Rivalry	W 80–71	15–9 (10–2)	Ted Constant Convocation Center (8,472); Norfolk, Virginia
02/04/2012; 5:00 pm, ESPNU		at George Mason	L 50–54	15–10 (10–3)	Patriot Center (9,840); Fairfax, Virginia
02/08/2012; 7:00 pm		at William & Mary; Rivalry	W 70–51	16–10 (11–3)	Kaplan Arena (2,324); Williamsburg, Virginia
02/11/2012; 2:00 pm, CSN		VCU; Rivalry	L 64–68	16–11 (11–4)	Ted Constant Convocation Center (8,472); Norfolk, Virginia
02/14/2012; 7:00 pm		UNC Wilmington	W 81–64	17–11 (12–4)	Ted Constant Convocation Center (7,347); Norfolk, Virginia
02/18/2012*; 5:00 pm, ESPNU		at Missouri State; ESPN BracketBusters	W 73–67	18–11	JQH Arena (6,344); Springfield, Missouri
02/22/2012; 7:00 pm		at Georgia State	W 65–60	19–11 (13–4)	GSU Sports Arena (2,403); Atlanta
02/25/2012; 4:00 pm, CSN		Drexel	L 72–73	19–12 (13–5)	Ted Constant Convocation Center (8,472); Norfolk, Virginia
CAA tournament
03/03/2012; 2:30 pm, TCN	(4)	vs. (5) Delaware; Quarterfinals	W 88–74	20–12	Richmond Coliseum (5,889); Richmond, Virginia
03/04/2012; 2:00 pm, TCN	(4)	vs. (1) Drexel; Semifinals	L 51–68	20–13	Richmond Coliseum (11,200); Richmond, Virginia
CIT
03/13/2012*; 7:00 pm		Coastal Carolina; First Round	W 68–66	21–13	Ted Constant Convocation Center (2,246); Norfolk, Virginia
03/18/2012*; 3:00 pm		USC Upstate; Second Round	W 65–56	22–13	Norfolk Scope Arena (2,091); Norfolk, Virginia
03/21/2012*; 7:00 pm		Mercer; Quarterfinals	L 73–79	22–14	Ted Constant Convocation Center (3,412); Norfolk, Virginia
*Non-conference game. ^{#}Rankings from AP Poll. (#) Tournament seedings in parentheses. All times are in Eastern Time.
