= 2011–12 UNC Wilmington Seahawks men's basketball team =

American college basketball season

2011–12 UNC Wilmington Seahawks men's basketball
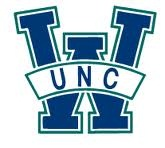
- Conference: Colonial Athletic Association
- Head coach: Buzz Peterson (2nd season)
- Home arena: Trask Coliseum

2011–12 CAA men's basketball standings
	Conf.				Overall
Team	W		L	PCT	W		L	PCT
Drexel	16	–	2	.889	29	–	7	.806
VCU†	15	–	3	.833	29	–	7	.806
George Mason	14	–	4	.778	24	–	9	.727
Old Dominion	13	–	5	.722	21	–	13	.618
Delaware	12	–	6	.667	18	–	14	.563
Georgia State	11	–	7	.611	22	–	11	.667
Northeastern	9	–	9	.500	14	–	17	.452
James Madison	5	–	13	.278	12	–	20	.375
UNCW	5	–	13	.278	10	–	21	.323
William & Mary	4	–	14	.222	6	–	26	.188
Hofstra	3	–	15	.167	10	–	22	.313
Towson	1	–	17	.056	1	–	31	.031
† 2012 CAA tournament winner Rankings from AP poll

The 2011–12 UNC Wilmington Seahawks men's basketball team represented the University of North Carolina Wilmington during the 2011–12 NCAA Division I men's basketball season. The Seahawks, led by second year head coach Buzz Peterson, played their home games at the Trask Coliseum and were members of the Colonial Athletic Association.

== Roster ==
Number	Name	Position	Height	Weight	Year	Hometown
	Nate Anderson	Forward	6-10		Freshman	
	Cam Chambers	Guard	6-5		Senior	
	Trevor Deloach	Guard	6-5		Senior	
	Freddie Jackson	Guard	6-4		Freshmen	
	Tanner Milson	Guard	6-2		Sophomore	
	Donate Morales	Forward	6-7		Freshmen	
	Craig Ponder	Forward	6-1		Sophomore	
	Keith Rendelman	Forward	6-8		Junior	
	Shane Reybold	Forward	6-8		Sophomore	
	Dylan Sherwood	Freshmen	6-9		Forward	
	K.K. Simmons	Freshmen	6-4		Guard	
	Adam Smith	Freshmen	6-1		Guard	

== Schedule ==
Date time, TV	Opponent	Result	Record	Site (attendance) city, state
Regular Season
11/12/2011	at Maryland	L 62-71		Comcast Center (12,873); College Park, MY
11/19/2011	at Dayton	L 49-74		University of Dayton Arena; Dayton, Ohio
11/22/2011; 7:00 pm	Marshall	L 64-69		Trask Coliseum (3,270); Wilmington, North Carolina
11/26/2011; 2:00 pm	Davidson	L 67-70		Trask Coliseum (2,854); Wilmington, North Carolina
11/26/2011; 7:00 pm	at Toledo	L 67-70		Savage Arena (3,785); Toledo, Ohio
12/03/2011; 7:00 pm	at Illinois State	W 63-54		Savage Arena (5,157); Toledo, Ohio
12/06/2011	at Liberty	W 77-68		Vines Center; Lynchburg, Virginia
12/17/2011; 7:30 pm, ESPN3	at VCU	L 64-87		Stuart C. Siegel Center (7,617); Richmond, Virginia
12/19/2011	Campbell	W 67-65		Trask Coliseum; Wilmington, North Carolina
12/21/2011; 7:00 pm, ACC Network	at Wake Forest	L 78-87		LJVM Memorial Coliseum; Winston-Salem, North Carolina
12/30/2011; 7:00 pm	Furman	W 72-61		Trask Coliseum (3,264); Wilmington, North Carolina
01/02/2012	Delaware	W 80-75		Trask Coliseum; Wilmington, North Carolina
01/04/2012	at Northeastern	W 70-62		Matthews Arena; Boston
01/07/2012	Hofstra	W 86-80		Trask Coliseum; Wilmington, North Carolina
01/12/2012; 7:00 pm, CBS	at Georgia State; Barefoot for Bare Feet	L 61-75		GSU Sports Arena; Atlanta
01/14/2012; 7:00 pm	Drexel	L 57-79		Trask Coliseum (3,838); Wilmington, North Carolina
12/18/2012	James Madison	L 61-69		Trask Coliseum; Wilmington, North Carolina
12/21/2012	at William & Mary	W 68-66		Kaplan Arena; Williamsburg, Virginia
01/23/2012; 9:00 pm, MASN	at George Mason	L 61-67		Patriot Center (4,147); Fairfax, Virginia
01/25/2012; 7:00 pm	at Old Dominion	L 48-53		Trask Coliseum (3,413); Wilmington, North Carolina
01/28/2012	at Towson	L 61-66		Towson Center; Towson, Maryland
02/01/2012; 7:00 pm	Georgia State	L 53-69		Trask Coliseum; Wilmington, North Carolina
02/04/2012	William & Mary's	W 81-68		Trask Coliseum; Wilmington, North Carolina
02/04/2012	William & Mary's	W 81-68		Trask Coliseum; Wilmington, North Carolina
02/08/2012; 7:00 pm	at Delaware	L 53-71		Bob Carpenter Center (1,759); Newark, Delaware
02/11/2012; 7:00 pm, MASN	George Mason	L 69-75		Trask Coliseum (3,513); Wilmington, North Carolina
02/14/2012; 7:00 pm	at Old Dominion	L 69-75		Ted Constant Convocation Center (7,347); Norfolk, Virginia
02/18/2012; 7:00 pm	at Manhattan; ESPN BracketBusters	L 64-79		Draddy Gymnasium (1,388); Riverdale, New York
02/22/2012; 7:30 pm	VCU	L 59-63		Trask Coliseum; Wilmington, North Carolina
02/25/2012	Hofstra	L 64-93		Hofstra Arena; Hempstead, New York
2012 CAA men's basketball tournament
03/02/2012; 12:00 pm, Comcast Network	vs. James Madison; First round	W 70-59		Richmond Coliseum; Richmond, Virginia
03/03/2012; 12:00 pm, Comcast Network	vs. Drexel; Quarter-finals	W 59-47		Richmond Coliseum (5,889); Richmond, Virginia
*Non-conference game. ^{#}Rankings from AP Poll. (#) Tournament seedings in parentheses. All times are in Eastern Time.
