= 2011–12 Colonial Athletic Association men's basketball season =

- League: NCAA Division I
- Sport: Basketball
- Duration: November, 2011 – March, 2012
- Teams: 12
- TV partner(s): Comcast Network, ESPN

Regular Season
- Champion: Drexel
- Runners-up: VCU
- Season MVP: Ryan Pearson (George Mason)

Tournament
- Champions: VCU
- Runners-up: Drexel
- Finals MVP: Darius Theus (VCU)

CAA men's basketball seasons
- ← 2010–11 2012–13 , →

2011–12 CAA men's basketball standings
| | Conf. | | | | Overall |
| Team | W | | L | PCT | W | | L | PCT |
|---|---|---|---|---|---|---|---|---|
| Drexel | 16 | – | 2 | .889 | 29 | – | 7 | .806 |
| VCU† | 15 | – | 3 | .833 | 29 | – | 7 | .806 |
| George Mason | 14 | – | 4 | .778 | 24 | – | 9 | .727 |
| Old Dominion | 13 | – | 5 | .722 | 21 | – | 13 | .618 |
| Delaware | 12 | – | 6 | .667 | 18 | – | 14 | .563 |
| Georgia State | 11 | – | 7 | .611 | 22 | – | 11 | .667 |
| Northeastern | 9 | – | 9 | .500 | 14 | – | 17 | .452 |
| James Madison | 5 | – | 13 | .278 | 12 | – | 20 | .375 |
| UNCW | 5 | – | 13 | .278 | 10 | – | 21 | .323 |
| William & Mary | 4 | – | 14 | .222 | 6 | – | 26 | .188 |
| Hofstra | 3 | – | 15 | .167 | 10 | – | 22 | .313 |
| Towson | 1 | – | 17 | .056 | 1 | – | 31 | .031 |
† 2012 CAA tournament winner Rankings from AP poll

The 2011–12 CAA men's basketball season marked the 27th season of Colonial Athletic Association men's basketball, taking place between November 2011 and March 2012. Practices commenced in October 2011, and the season ended with the 2012 CAA men's basketball tournament.

== Preseason ==
=== Coaching changes ===
- Ron Hunter was hired to be the new head coach for Georgia State on March 21, 2011.
- Pat Skerry replaced Pat Kennedy as head coach for Towson after finishing 0–18 in CAA play during the 2010–11 season.

=== Preseason poll ===
| Rank | Team |
|---|---|
| 1 | Drexel |
| 2 | George Mason |
| 3 | VCU |
| 4 | Old Dominion |
| 5 | James Madison |
| 6 | William & Mary |
| 7 | Delaware |
| 8 | Hofstra |
| 9 | Northeastern |
| 10 | UNC Wilimgton |
| 11 | Georgia State |
| 12 | Towson |

=== Preseason All-Conference Teams ===
| Award | Recipients |
|---|---|
| First Team | Kent Bazemore (Old Dominion) Bradford Burgess (VCU); Samme Givens (Drexel); Quinn McDowell (William & Mary); Ryan Pearson (George Mason) |
| Second Team | Chris Fouch (Drexel) Devon Moore (James Madison); Mike Moore (Hofstra); Keith Rendleman (UNC Wilmington); Devon Saddler (Delaware) |

CAA Preseason Player of the Year: Kent Bazemore, Old Dominion

== Regular season ==
=== Head coaches ===
- Monté Ross, Delaware
- Bruiser Flint, Drexel
- Paul Hewitt, George Mason
- Ron Hunter, Georgia State
- Mo Cassara, Hofstra
- Matt Brady, James Madison
- Bill Coen, Northeastern
- Blaine Taylor, Old Dominion
- Pat Skerry, Towson
- Buzz Peterson, UNC Wilmington
- Shaka Smart, VCU
- Tony Shaver, William & Mary

=== Rankings ===
Legend
| Increase in ranking |
| Decrease in ranking |
| Not ranked previous week |

| | | Pre | Wk 2 | Wk 3 | Wk 4 | Wk 5 | Wk 6 | Wk 7 | Wk 8 | Wk 9 | Wk 10 | Wk 11 | Wk 12 | Wk 13 | Wk 14 | Wk 15 | Wk 16 | Wk 17 | Wk 18 | Wk 19 | Final |
|---|---|---|---|---|---|---|---|---|---|---|---|---|---|---|---|---|---|---|---|---|---|
| Delaware | AP | | | | | | | | | | | | | | | | | | | | |
| Delaware | C | | | | | | | | | | | | | | | | | | | | |
| Drexel | AP | | | | | | | | | | | | | | | | | | | | |
| Drexel | C | | | | | | | | | | | | | | | | | | | | |
| George Mason | AP | | | | | | | | | | | | | | | | | | | | |
| George Mason | C | | | | | | | | | | | | | | | | | | | | |
| Georgia State | AP | | | | | | | | | | | | | | | | | | | | |
| Georgia State | C | | | | | | | | | | | | | | | | | | | | |
| Hofstra | AP | | | | | | | | | | | | | | | | | | | | |
| Hofstra | C | | | | | | | | | | | | | | | | | | | | |
| James Madison | AP | | | | | | | | | | | | | | | | | | | | |
| James Madison | C | | | | | | | | | | | | | | | | | | | | |
| Northeastern | AP | | | | | | | | | | | | | | | | | | | | |
| Northeastern | C | | | | | | | | | | | | | | | | | | | | |
| Old Dominion | AP | | | | | | | | | | | | | | | | | | | | |
| Old Dominion | C | | | | | | | | | | | | | | | | | | | | |
| Towson | AP | | | | | | | | | | | | | | | | | | | | |
| Towson | C | | | | | | | | | | | | | | | | | | | | |
| UNC Wilmington | AP | | | | | | | | | | | | | | | | | | | | |
| UNC Wilmington | C | | | | | | | | | | | | | | | | | | | | |
| VCU | AP | | | | | | | | | | | | | | | | | | | | |
| VCU | C | | | | | | | | | | | | | | | | | | | | |
| William & Mary | AP | | | | | | | | | | | | | | | | | | | | |
| William & Mary | C | | | | | | | | | | | | | | | | | | | | |

== Postseason ==
=== Conference tournament ===
- March 2–5, 2012: Colonial Athletic Association Men's Basketball Tournament, Richmond Coliseum, Richmond, Virginia

VCU defeated Drexel, 59–56, in the finals of the 2012 CAA tournament to win the conference. They earned an automatic bid to the 2012 NCAA tournament.

==== Bracket ====
First round Friday, March 2
8 | James Madison | 59
9 | UNC Wilmington | 70
5 | Delaware | 72
12 | Towson | 65
7 | Northeastern | 57
10 | William & Mary | 49
6 | Georgia State | 85
11 | Hofstra | 50

Quarterfinals; Saturday, March 3
1 | Drexel | 59
9 | UNC Wilmington | 47
4 | Old Dominion | 88
5 | Delaware | 74
2 | VCU | 75
7 | Northeastern | 65
3 | George Mason | 61
6 | Georgia State | 59

Semifinals; Sunday, March 4
1 | Drexel | 68
4 | Old Dominion | 51
2 | VCU | 74
3 | George Mason | 64

Championship Game; Monday, March 5
1 | Drexel | 56
2 | VCU | 59

=== NCAA tournament ===
The CAA had one bid to the NCAA Division I tournament, that being the automatic bid of the VCU Rams.

| Seed | Region | School | First Four | Round of 64 | Round of 32 |
|---|---|---|---|---|---|
| 12 | South | VCU | Bye | W vs. (5) Wichita State 62–59 | L vs. (4) Indiana 61–63 |
| | Bids | W-L (%): | 0–0 (–) | 1–0 (1.000) | TOTAL: 1–1 (.500) |
