= 2011–12 Drexel Dragons men's basketball team =

American college basketball season

2011–12 Drexel Dragons men's basketball

CAA regular season champions

NIT, Quarterfinals
- Conference: Colonial Athletic Association

Ranking
- AP: No. RV
- Record: 29–7 (16–2 CAA)
- Head coach: Bruiser Flint (11th season)
- Assistant coaches: Mike Connors (4th season); Ashley Howard (2nd season); Matt Collier (2nd season)
- MVPs: Samme Givens; Frantz Massenat
- Home arena: Daskalakis Athletic Center

2011–12 CAA men's basketball standings
	Conf.				Overall
Team	W		L	PCT	W		L	PCT
Drexel	16	–	2	.889	29	–	7	.806
VCU†	15	–	3	.833	29	–	7	.806
George Mason	14	–	4	.778	24	–	9	.727
Old Dominion	13	–	5	.722	21	–	13	.618
Delaware	12	–	6	.667	18	–	14	.563
Georgia State	11	–	7	.611	22	–	11	.667
Northeastern	9	–	9	.500	14	–	17	.452
James Madison	5	–	13	.278	12	–	20	.375
UNCW	5	–	13	.278	10	–	21	.323
William & Mary	4	–	14	.222	6	–	26	.188
Hofstra	3	–	15	.167	10	–	22	.313
Towson	1	–	17	.056	1	–	31	.031
† 2012 CAA tournament winner Rankings from AP poll

The 2011–12 Drexel Dragons men's basketball team represented Drexel University during the 2011–12 NCAA Division I men's basketball season. The Dragons, led by 11th year head coach Bruiser Flint, played their home games at Daskalakis Athletic Center and are members of the Colonial Athletic Association. They finished the season 29–7, 16–2 in CAA play to be crowned CAA regular season champions. They lost in the championship game of the CAA Basketball tournament to VCU. As a conference champion who failed to win their conference tournament, they received an automatic bid into the 2012 NIT where they defeated UCF in the first round and Northern Iowa in the second round before falling in the quarterfinals to Massachusetts.

== Pre-season ==
=== Class of 2011 commitments ===
College recruiting information
Name	Hometown	School	Height	Weight	Commit date
Kazembe Abif; PF	Elizabeth, New Jersey	Lawrenceville School	6 ft 6 in (1.98 m)	215 lb (98 kg)	
Kazembe Abif; PF	Recruit ratings: ESPN: (81)				
Tavon Allen; SF	New Haven, Connecticut	Worcester Academy	6 ft 7 in (2.01 m)	190 lb (86 kg)	
Tavon Allen; SF	Recruit ratings: Scout: 247Sports: ESPN: (84)				
Casey Carroll; PF	Youngstown, Ohio	The Kiski School	6 ft 8 in (2.03 m)	200 lb (91 kg)	
Casey Carroll; PF	Recruit ratings: ESPN: (84)				
Damion Lee; PF	Owings Mills, Maryland	St. Thomas More School	6 ft 4 in (1.93 m)	190 lb (86 kg)	
Damion Lee; PF	Recruit ratings: Scout: Rivals: 247Sports: ESPN: (85)				
Aquil Younger; PF	Philadelphia	Penn Wood High School	6 ft 0 in (1.83 m)	N/A	
Aquil Younger; PF	Recruit ratings: ESPN: (84)				
Overall recruit ranking:
Note: In many cases, Scout, Rivals, 247Sports, On3, and ESPN may conflict in their listings of height and weight.; In these cases, the average was taken. ESPN grades are on a 100-point scale.; Sources: "ESPN". ESPN.

== Roster ==
Number	Name	Position	Height	Weight	Year	Hometown
1	Kazembe Abif	Center	6–7	210	Freshman	Elizabeth, New Jersey
2	Aquil Younger	Guard	6–0	163	Freshman	Philadelphia
3	Chris Fouch	Guard	6–2	178	Junior	New York City
4	Frantz Massenat	Guard	6–4	185	Sophomore	Ewing, New Jersey
5	Stevan Manojlovic	Guard	6–5	197	Sophomore	Toronto, Ontario
11	Tavon Allen	Forward	6–7	170	Freshman	New Haven, Connecticut
14	Damion Lee	Guard	6–6	200	Freshman	Baltimore, Maryland
20	Casey Carroll	Forward	6–8	225	Freshman	Canfield, Ohio
22	Jake Lerner	Guard	6–2	190	Sophomore	Philadelphia
32	Derrick Thomas	Guard	6–4	195	Junior	New York City
33	Goran Pantovic	Forward	6–10	230	Sophomore	Belgrade, Serbia
35	Dartaye Ruffin	Forward	6–8	250	Sophomore	Stoughton, Massachusetts
44	Daryl McCoy	Forward	6–9	270	Junior	Hartford, Connecticut
45	Samme Givens	Forward	6–5	220	Senior	Philadelphia

== Schedule ==
Date time, TV	Rank^{#}	Opponent^{#}	Result	Record	Site (attendance) city, state
Regular Season
November 15, 2011*; 6:00 am, ESPN	No. RV	at Rider; ESPN College Tip Off Maraton	W 80–62	1–0	Alumni Gymnasium (1,650); Lawrenceville, NJ
November 18, 2011*; 1:00 pm		vs. Norfolk State; Paradise Jam First Round	L 56–61	1–1	Sports and Fitness Center (2,845); Saint Thomas, USVI
November 19, 2011*; 3:30 pm		vs. Virginia; Paradise Jam Consolation round	L 35–49	1–2	Sports and Fitness Center (1,677); Saint Thomas, USVI
November 21, 2011*; 1:00 pm		vs. Winthrop; Paradise Jam 7th place Game	W 68–45	2–2	Sports and Fitness Center (500); Saint Thomas, USVI
November 30, 2011*; 7:00 pm		at Saint Joseph's	L 49–62	2–3	Hagan Arena (4,200); Philadelphia, PA
December 3, 2011; 4:00 pm, TCN		at Delaware	L 60–71	2–4 (0–1)	Bob Carpenter Center (2,421); Newark, DE
December 10, 2011*; 4:00 pm		Princeton	W 64–60	3–4	Daskalakis Athletic Center (2,225); Philadelphia, PA
December 13, 2011*; 7:00 pm		at Niagara	W 71–58	4–4	Gallagher Center (1,248); Lewiston, NY
December 17, 2011*; 4:00 pm		Bradley	W 73–68	5–4	Daskalakis Athletic Center (1,821); Philadelphia, PA
December 22, 2011*; 7:00 pm		at Binghamton	W 68–44	6–4	Binghamton University Events Center (1,895); Vestal, NY
December 28, 2011*; 7:00 pm		Fairfield	W 77–69	7–4	Daskalakis Athletic Center (2,469); Philadelphia, PA
December 31, 2011*; 7:00 pm		Saint Francis (PA)	W 63–42	8–4	Daskalakis Athletic Center (2,247); Philadelphia, PA
January 2, 2012; 7:00 pm		at Georgia State	L 44–58	8–5 (0–2)	GSU Sports Arena (872); Atlanta, GA
January 4, 2012; 7:00 pm		Towson	W 60–27	9–5 (1–2)	Daskalakis Athletic Center (1,651); Philadelphia, PA
January 8, 2012; 8:00 pm, CSN		VCU	W 64–58	10–5 (2–2)	Daskalakis Athletic Center (2,532); Philadelphia, PA
January 12, 2012; 8:00 pm, ESPNU		George Mason	W 60–53	11–5 (3–2)	Daskalakis Athletic Center (2,532); Philadelphia, PA
January 14, 2012; 7:00 pm		at UNC Wilmington	W 79–57	12–5 (4–2)	Trask Coliseum (3,838); Wilmington, NC
January 18, 2012; 7:00 pm		at Hofstra	W 56–50	13–5 (5–2)	Hofstra Arena (1,554); Hempstead, NY
January 21, 2012; 4:00 pm, TCN		Northeastern	W 79–65	14–5 (6–2)	Daskalakis Athletic Center (2,532); Philadelphia, PA
January 23, 2012; 7:00 pm		at William & Mary	W 64–48	15–5 (7–2)	Kaplan Arena (1,795); Williamsburg, VA
January 25, 2012; 7:00 pm, TCN		Georgia State	W 68–46	16–5 (8–2)	Daskalakis Athletic Center (2,017); Philadelphia, PA
January 28, 2012; 2:00 pm		Delaware	W 71–55	17–5 (9–2)	Daskalakis Athletic Center (2,532); Philadelphia, PA
February 1, 2012; 7:00 pm, ESPN3		at Northeastern	W 61–53	18–5 (10–2)	Matthews Arena (1,374); Boston, MA
February 4, 2012; 7:00 pm, ESPN3		at Towson	W 65–57	19–5 (11–2)	Towson Center (1,390); Towson, MD
February 8, 2012; 7:00 pm		at James Madison	W 63–56	20–5 (12–2)	JMU Convocation Center (3,143); Harrisonburg, VA
February 11, 2012; 4:00 pm		Hofstra	W 78–67	21–5 (13–2)	Daskalakis Athletic Center (2,251); Philadelphia, PA
February 14, 2012; 7:00 pm, CSN		William & Mary	W 63–61	22–5 (14–2)	Daskalakis Athletic Center (1,627); Philadelphia, PA
February 18, 2012*; 11:00 am, ESPNU		at Cleveland State; ESPN BracketBusters	W 69–49	23–5	Wolstein Center (2,583); Cleveland, OH
February 22, 2012; 7:00 pm, ESPNU	No. RV	James Madison	W 78–61	24–5 (15–2)	Daskalakis Athletic Center (2,532); Philadelphia, PA
February 25, 2012; 4:00 pm, CSN	No. RV	at Old Dominion	W 73–72	25–5 (16–2)	Ted Constant Convocation Center (8,472); Norfolk, VA
2012 CAA men's basketball tournament
March 3, 2012; 12:00 pm, TCN	(1) No. RV	vs. (9) UNC Wilmington; Quarterfinals	W 59–47	26–5	Richmond Coliseum (5,889); Richmond, VA
March 4, 2012; 2:00 pm, TCN	(1) No. RV	vs. (4) Old Dominion; Semifinals	W 68–51	27–5	Richmond Coliseum (11,200); Richmond, VA
March 5, 2012; 7:00 pm, ESPN	(1) No. RV	vs. (2) No. RV VCU; Championship	L 56–59	27–6	Richmond Coliseum (11,200); Richmond, VA
2012 NIT
March 14, 2012*; 7:15 pm, ESPN3	(3) No. RV	(6) UCF; First Round	W 81–56	28–6	Daskalakis Athletic Center (1,821); Philadelphia, PA
March 18, 2012*; 11:00 am, ESPN	(3) No. RV	(7) Northern Iowa; Second Round	W 67–65	29–6	Daskalakis Athletic Center (1,884); Philadelphia, PA
March 20, 2012*; 7:00 pm, ESPN	(3) No. RV	(5) Massachusetts; Quarterfinals	L 70–72	29–7	Daskalakis Athletic Center (2,293); Philadelphia, PA
*Non-conference game. ^{#}Rankings from AP Poll. (#) Tournament seedings in parentheses. All times are in Eastern Time.

== Rankings ==
Ranking movements Legend: RV = Received votes
	Week																			
Poll	Pre	1	2	3	4	5	6	7	8	9	10	11	12	13	14	15	16	17	Post	Final
AP	RV	RV														RV	RV	RV	RV	N/A
Coaches	RV	RV												RV	RV	RV	RV	RV		

== Awards ==
Bruiser Flint

- CAA Coach Of The Year

Samme Givens

- CAA All-Conference Second Team
- CAA Player of the Week

Damion Lee

- CAA Rookie of the Year
- CAA All-Rookie Team
- CAA All-Tournament Team
- CAA Rookie of the Week (4)

Frantz Massenat

- CAA All-Conference First Team
- CAA All-Tournament Team
- CAA Player of the Week
