= 2011–12 Delaware Fightin' Blue Hens men's basketball team =

American college basketball season

2011–12 Delaware Fightin' Blue Hens men's basketball

CBI, First Round
- Conference: Colonial Athletic Association
- Record: 18–14 (12–6 CAA)
- Head coach: Monté Ross (6th season)
- Assistant coaches: Jeff Rafferty; Mike Pegues; Phil Martelli, Jr.
- Home arena: Bob Carpenter Center

2011–12 CAA men's basketball standings
	Conf.				Overall
Team	W		L	PCT	W		L	PCT
Drexel	16	–	2	.889	29	–	7	.806
VCU†	15	–	3	.833	29	–	7	.806
George Mason	14	–	4	.778	24	–	9	.727
Old Dominion	13	–	5	.722	21	–	13	.618
Delaware	12	–	6	.667	18	–	14	.563
Georgia State	11	–	7	.611	22	–	11	.667
Northeastern	9	–	9	.500	14	–	17	.452
James Madison	5	–	13	.278	12	–	20	.375
UNCW	5	–	13	.278	10	–	21	.323
William & Mary	4	–	14	.222	6	–	26	.188
Hofstra	3	–	15	.167	10	–	22	.313
Towson	1	–	17	.056	1	–	31	.031
† 2012 CAA tournament winner Rankings from AP poll

The 2011–12 Delaware Fightin' Blue Hens men's basketball team represented the University of Delaware during the 2011–12 NCAA Division I men's basketball season. The Fightin' Blue Hens, led by sixth year head coach Monté Ross, played their home games at the Bob Carpenter Center and are members of the Colonial Athletic Association. They finished the season 18–14, 12–6 in CAA play to finish in fifth place in CAA play. They lost in the quarterfinals of the CAA Basketball tournament to Old Dominion. They were invited to the 2012 College Basketball Invitational where they lost in the first round to Butler.

== Roster ==
Number	Name	Position	Height	Weight	Year	Hometown
0	Kevin McNeil	Forward	6–8	230	Junior	Newport News, Virginia
3	Khalid Lewis	Guard	6–3	185	Freshman	Trenton, New Jersey
4	Jarvis Threatt	Guard	6–2	170	Freshman	Richmond, Virginia
10	Devon Saddler	Guard	6–2	205	Sophomore	Aberdeen, Maryland
12	Samer Madarani	Guard	5–10	160	Senior	Newark, Delaware
13	Kyle Anderson	Guard	6–2	185	Freshman	Newark, Illinois
14	Brendan McNulty	Guard	5–11	190	Junior	Downingtown, Pennsylvania
15	Chris Cooper	Forward	6–5	210	Freshman	Onancock, Virginia
21	Marvin King-Davis	Forward	6–7	205	Freshman	Richmond, Virginia
23	Hakim McCullar	Forward	6–8	250	Senior	Cincinnati, Ohio
31	Will Townsville	Guard	6–3	180	Junior	Newark, Delaware
32	Josh Brinkley	Forward	6–6	245	Junior	Richmond, Virginia
33	Carl Baptiste	Forward	6–8	240	Junior	Pittstown, New Jersey
44	Jamelle Hagins	Forward	6–9	240	Junior	Roanoke, Virginia
55	Tommy Williams	Forward	6–6	210	Sophomore	Hamden, Connecticut

== Schedule ==
Date time, TV	Rank^{#}	Opponent^{#}	Result	Record	Site (attendance) city, state
Regular season
11/11/2011*; 7:00 pm		at Radford	L 54–58	0–1	Dedmon Center (1,642); Radford, Virginia
11/18/2011*; 7:00 pm, ESPN3		at Villanova	L 69–79	0–2	The Pavilion (6,500); Villanova, Pennsylvania
11/22/2011*; 7:00 pm		Cornell	W 72–64	1–2	Bob Carpenter Center (1,784); Newark, Delaware
11/26/2011*; 2:00 pm		Lafayette	W 81–78	2–2	Bob Carpenter Center (1,609); Newark, Delaware
11/30/2011*; 7:00 pm		at Boston University	L 67–73	2–3	Case Gym (553); Boston
12/03/2011; 4:00 pm, TCN/CSN-NE		Drexel	W 71–60	3–3 (1–0)	Bob Carpenter Center (2,421); Newark, Delaware
12/07/2011*; 7:00 pm		at Penn	L 60–69	3–4	The Palestra (2,351); Philadelphia
12/10/2011*; 1:00 pm		at Delaware State; Route 1 Rivalry	W 58–42	4–4	Memorial Hall (912); Dover, Delaware
12/19/2011*; 7:00 pm		La Salle	W 70–66	5–4	Bob Carpenter Center (2,345); Newark, Delaware
12/22/2011*; 7:00 pm		at Howard	L 83–88 ^{OT}	5–5	Burr Gymnasium (380); Washington, D.C.
12/30/2011*; 7:00 pm		at Temple	L 63–66	5–6	Bob Carpenter Center (4,234); Newark, Delaware
01/02/2012; 2:00 pm		at UNC Wilmington	L 75–80	5–7 (1–1)	Trask Coliseum (2,657); Wilmington, North Carolina
01/04/2012; 7:00 pm		Hofstra	W 67–66	6–7 (2–1)	Bob Carpenter Center (1,580); Newark, Delaware
01/07/2012; 4:00 pm, TCN/CSN-MA		at William & Mary	W 75–64	7–7 (3–1)	Kaplan Arena (2,119); Williamsburg, Virginia
01/11/2012; 7:00 pm		Old Dominion	L 66–68	7–8 (3–2)	Bob Carpenter Center (1,911); Newark, Delaware
01/14/2012; 4:00 pm, TCN/CSS		VCU	L 55–68	7–9 (3–3)	Bob Carpenter Center (3,568); Newark, Delaware
01/18/2012; 7:00 pm, ESPN3		at George Mason	L 63–89	7–10 (3–4)	Patriot Center (3,927); Fairfax, Virginia
01/21/2012; 2:00 pm		Georgia State	W 77–74 ^{2OT}	8–10 (4–4)	Bob Carpenter Center (3,773); Newark, Delaware
01/23/2012; 7:00 pm, ESPN3		Towson	W 62–43	9–10 (5–4)	Bob Carpenter Center (1,855); Newark, Delaware
01/25/2012; 7:00 pm		at Northeastern	T 62–62	10–10 (5–5)	Matthews Arena (1,221); Boston, Massachusetts
01/28/2012; 2:00 pm, TCN		at Drexel	L 55–71	10–11 (5–6)	Daskalakis Athletic Center (2,532); Philadelphia, Pennsylvania
02/01/2012; 7:00 pm		George Mason	L 60–65	10–12 (6–6)	Bob Carpenter Center (2,091); Newark, Delaware
02/04/2012; 2:00 pm, TCN/CSS		at James Madison	W 85–80	11–12 (7–6)	JMU Convocation Center (4,625); Harrisonburg, Virginia
02/08/2012; 7:00 pm		UNC Wilmington	W 71–53	12–12 (8–6)	Bob Carpenter Center (1,759); Newark, Delaware
02/11/2012; 2:00 pm		at Georgia State	W 80–77	13–12 (9–6)	GSU Sports Arena (1,751); Atlanta
02/14/2012; 7:00 pm		at Hofstra	W 71–57	14–12 (10–6)	Hofstra Arena (1,785); Hempstead, New York
02/18/2012*; 2:00 pm		Hampton; ESPN BracketBusters	W 68–64	15–12	Bob Carpenter Center (2,460); Newark, Delaware
02/22/2012; 7:00 pm		at Towson	W 76–69	16–12 (11–6)	Towson Center (1,021); Towson, Maryland
02/25/2012; 12:00 pm, TCN/CSN-NE		Northeastern	W 82–72	17–12 (12–6)	Bob Carpenter Center (3,527); Newark, Delaware
2012 CAA men's basketball tournament
03/02/2012; 2:30 pm, TCN		vs. Towson; First Round	W 72–65	18–12	Richmond Coliseum (3,081); Richmond, Virginia
03/03/2012; 2:30 pm, TCN		vs. Old Dominion; Quarterfinals	L 74–88	18–13	Richmond Coliseum (5,889); Richmond, Virginia
2012 CBI
03/14/2012*; 8:00 pm, HDNet		at Butler; First Round	L 58–75	18–14	Hinkle Fieldhouse (2,349); Indianapolis
*Non-conference game. ^{#}Rankings from AP Poll. (#) Tournament seedings in parentheses. All times are in Eastern Time.
