= 2011–12 George Mason Patriots men's basketball team =

American college basketball season

2011–12 George Mason Patriots men's basketball
- Conference: Colonial Athletic Association
- Record: 24–9 (14–4 CAA)
- Head coach: Paul Hewitt
- Assistant coaches: Roland Houston; Mike Wells; Chris Kreider
- Home arena: Patriot Center

2011–12 CAA men's basketball standings
	Conf.				Overall
Team	W		L	PCT	W		L	PCT
Drexel	16	–	2	.889	29	–	7	.806
VCU†	15	–	3	.833	29	–	7	.806
George Mason	14	–	4	.778	24	–	9	.727
Old Dominion	13	–	5	.722	21	–	13	.618
Delaware	12	–	6	.667	18	–	14	.563
Georgia State	11	–	7	.611	22	–	11	.667
Northeastern	9	–	9	.500	14	–	17	.452
James Madison	5	–	13	.278	12	–	20	.375
UNCW	5	–	13	.278	10	–	21	.323
William & Mary	4	–	14	.222	6	–	26	.188
Hofstra	3	–	15	.167	10	–	22	.313
Towson	1	–	17	.056	1	–	31	.031
† 2012 CAA tournament winner Rankings from AP poll

The 2011–12 George Mason Patriots men's basketball team represented George Mason University during the 2011–12 college basketball season. This was the 46th season for the program. The Patriots, led by first year head coach Paul Hewitt, are members of the Colonial Athletic Association and played their home games at the Patriot Center. They finished the season 24–9, 14–4 in CAA play. They lost in the semifinals of the 2011 CAA men's basketball tournament to VCU.

== Awards ==
NCAA Men's Basketball All-Americans

- Ryan Pearson - Honorable Mention

CAA Player of the Year

- Ryan Pearson

First Team All-CAA

- Ryan Pearson

CAA Player of the Week

- Ryan Pearson - Jan. 2
- Ryan Pearson - Jan. 30

== Roster ==
2011–12 George Mason Patriots men's basketball team
Players
Coaches

Pos.	#	Name	Height	Weight	Year	Previous school	Hometown
G	0	Bryon Allen	6 ft 3 in (1.91 m)	214 lb (97 kg)	So	St. Thomas More	Largo, MD
F	21	Jonathan Arledge	6 ft 9 in (2.06 m)	228 lb (103 kg)	So	KIMA	Washington, DC
F	1	Paris Bennett	6 ft 6 in (1.98 m)	226 lb (103 kg)	RS So	St. Patrick's	Elizabeth, NJ
G	15	Jordan Baird	5 ft 11 in (1.8 m)	160 lb (73 kg)	Jr	Stonewall Jackson	Gainesville, VA
C	4	Erik Copes	6 ft 8 in (2.03 m)	244 lb (111 kg)	Fr	Imhotep Charter	Philadelphia, PA
G	45	Andre Cornelius	5 ft 10 in (1.78 m)	174 lb (79 kg)	Sr	Victory Christian	Charlotte, NC
G	13	Corey Edwards	5 ft 11 in (1.8 m)	177 lb (80 kg)	Fr	Christ the King	Middle Village, NY
F	12	Vaughn Gray	6 ft 5 in (1.96 m)	185 lb (84 kg)	Fr	St. Benedict's	Elmwood Park, NJ
G	30	Jacob Hoxie	6 ft 3 in (1.91 m)	203 lb (92 kg)	So	Montreat College	Garner, NC
G	2	Bryce Lewis	5 ft 9 in (1.75 m)	175 lb (79 kg)	Jr	Union	Union, NJ
F	22	Mike Morrison	6 ft 9 in (2.06 m)	237 lb (108 kg)	Sr	Lakewood	St. Petersburg, FL
F	14	Anali Okoloji	6 ft 8 in (2.03 m)	232 lb (105 kg)	So	Impact Academy	Brooklyn, NY
F	24	Ryan Pearson	6 ft 6 in (1.98 m)	237 lb (108 kg)	Sr	Christ the King	Far Rockaway, NY
G	11	Vertrail Vaughns	6 ft 2 in (1.88 m)	184 lb (83 kg)	RS So	Mesquite	Mesquite, TX
F	32	Johnnie Williams (injured)	6 ft 8 in (2.03 m)	266 lb (121 kg)	Jr	Briarcrest Christian	Memphis, TN
G	10	Sherrod Wright	6 ft 4 in (1.93 m)	196 lb (89 kg)	RS So	Mount Vernon	Mount Vernon, NY

Head coach

- Paul Hewitt (St. John Fisher)

Assistant coach(es)

- Chris Kreider (Lebanon Valley)
- Roland Houston (Rhode Island)
- Mike Wells (Mount Vernon Nazarene)

Legend

- (C) Team captain
- (S) Suspended
- (I) Ineligible
- (W) Walk-on
- Injured
- Current redshirt

Roster
Last update: 2011-10-20

== Stats ==
Player	GP	GS	MPG	FG%	3FG%	FT%	RPG	APG	SPG	BPG	PPG
Ryan Pearson	33	33	30.7	.503	.350	.725	8.2	1.8	1.3	0.5	17.0
Mike Morrison	33	33	26.8	.592	.000	.550	6.6	1.4	0.5	1.9	9.8
Sherrod Wright	32	15	26.4	.529	.404	.859	3.3	1.3	0.8	0.3	9.6
Vertrail Vaughns	33	33	25.3	.416	.356	.763	1.8	1.1	0.7	0.0	8.8
Bryon Allen	33	31	27.7	.407	.167	.737	2.6	3.7	1.0	0.2	7.5
Andre Cornelius	23	17	21.3	.400	.341	.735	2.3	1.1	0.8	0.0	6.7
Jonathan Arledge	31	2	12.0	.404	.200	.793	3.1	0.4	0.3	0.5	4.3
Vaughn Gray	32	0	11.3	.355	.405	.634	1.2	0.2	0.4	0.0	3.4
Erik Copes	27	0	15.0	.452	.000	.419	3.7	0.1	0.3	1.9	3.3
Corey Edwards	31	2	15.2	.338	.265	.727	1.3	2.2	1.0	0.0	2.5
Paris Bennett	16	0	5.8	.500	.333	.556	1.1	0.3	0.3	0.2	1.6
Jacob Hoxie	2	0	1.5	1.000	.000	.000	0.0	0.0	0.0	0.0	1.0
Jordan Baird	4	0	1.3	.333	.000	.000	0.3	0.3	0.0	0.0	0.5
Bryce Lewis	5	0	2.2	.000	.000	.000	0.0	0.4	0.2	0.0	0.0

== Game log ==
Date time, TV	Rank^{#}	Opponent^{#}	Result	Record	High points	High rebounds	High assists	Site (attendance) city, state
Exhibition
October 31, 2011*; 7:00 pm		Lycoming	W 90–62		– -	– -	– -	Patriot Center; Fairfax, VA
Non-conference regular season
November 11, 2011*; 7:30 pm		Rhode Island	W 92–90 ^{OT}	1–0	28 – Pearson	12 – Pearson	7 – Allen	Patriot Center (6,644); Fairfax, VA
November 14, 2011*; 9:30 pm, ESPN3		vs. Florida International; NIT Season Tip-Off	L 76–79 ^{OT}	1–1	18 – Pearson	10 – Morrison, Pearson	5 – Allen	Cassell Coliseum (3,052); Blacksburg, VA
November 15, 2011*; 8:30 pm		vs. Monmouth; NIT Season Tip-Off	W 71–39	2–1	16 – Pearson	12 – Pearson	5 – Edwards	Cassell Coliseum (3,148); Blacksburg, VA
November 19, 2011*; 7:00 pm		at Florida Atlantic	L 75–80 ^{OT}	2–2	21 – Vaughns	7 – Pearson	4 – Edwards	FAU Arena (2,854); Boca Raton, FL
November 21, 2011*; 7:30 pm		Brown; NIT Season Tip-Off - Consolation Bracket	W 74–48	3–2	23 – Pearson	8 – Copes	4 – Edwards	Patriot Center (1,536); Fairfax, VA
November 22, 2011*; 7:30 pm		Albany; NIT Season Tip-Off - Consolation Bracket	W 66–46	4–2	24 – Pearson	9 – Morrison	4 – Edwards, Vaughns	Patriot Center (1,384); Fairfax, VA
November 30, 2011*; 7:00 pm, MASN		Bucknell	W 61–57	5–2	16 – Pearson	7 – Allen, Morrison	5 – Allen	Patriot Center (5,057); Fairfax, VA
December 3, 2011; 7:00 pm		at Towson	W 65–53	6–2 (1–0)	14 – Morrison, Pearson	8 – Morrison	3 – Allen, Morrison	Towson Center (1,202); Towson, MD
December 6, 2011*; 7:00 pm, ESPN3		at Virginia	L 48–68	6–3	9 – Morrison, Pearson, Vaughns	6 – Copes	4 – Edwards	John Paul Jones Arena (8,954); Charlottesville, VA
December 10, 2011*; 4:00 pm		at Radford	W 76–61	7–3	17 – Morrison	11 – Morrison	6 – Allen	Dedmon Center (1,811); Radford, VA
December 21, 2011*; 7:00 pm, MASN		Duquesne	L 64–75	7–4	13 – Cornelius, Vaughns	9 – Pearson	5 – Allen	Patriot Center (4,054); Fairfax, VA
December 23, 2011*; 7:00 pm		Manhattan	W 81–61	8–4	25 – Pearson	11 – Morrison	6 – Allen	Patriot Center (4,014); Fairfax, VA
December 30, 2011*; 7:00 pm, ESPN3		at College of Charleston	W 84–76	9–4	35 – Pearson	14 – Pearson	5 – Allen	Carolina First Arena (5,008); Charleston, SC
CAA regular season
January 2, 2012; 12:00 pm		William & Mary	W 70–56	10–4 (2–0)	20 – Cornelius	6 – Morrison	6 – Allen	Patriot Center (5,017); Fairfax, VA
January 5, 2012; 7:00 pm, CSN		at Old Dominion	W 63-54	11–4 (3–0)	16 – Pearson	14 – Pearson	2 – Cornelius	Ted Constant Convocation Center (7,783); Norfolk, VA
January 7, 2012; 7:00 pm, CSN		Georgia State	W 61–58	12–4 (4–0)	17 – Vaughns	15 – Morrison	3 – Allen	Patriot Center (5,191); Fairfax, VA
January 12, 2012; 8:00 pm, ESPNU		at Drexel	L 53–60	12–5 (4–1)	10 – Morrison	11 – Pearson	4 – Pearson	Daskalakis Athletic Center (2,532); Philadelphia, PA
January 14, 2012; 7:00 pm, CSN		at James Madison	W 89–83	13–5 (5–1)	19 – Gray, Pearson	7 – Pearson	3 – Allen	JMU Convocation Center (4,312); Harrisonburg, VA
January 18, 2012; 7:00 pm, ESPN3		Delaware	W 89–63	14–5 (6–1)	24 – Pearson	10 – Pearson	4 – Allen, Edwards	Patriot Center (3,927); Fairfax, VA
January 21, 2012; 4:00 pm, CSN		Towson	W 72–60	15–5 (7–1)	22 – Wright	5 – Wright	5 – Edwards	Patriot Center (5,663); Fairfax, VA
January 23, 2012; 9:00 pm, MASN		UNC Wilmington	W 67–61	16–5 (8–1)	20 – Pearson	12 – Pearson	3 – Cornelius, Morrison	Patriot Center (4,147); Fairfax, VA
January 25, 2012; 7:00 pm		at Hofstra	W 55–50	17–5 (9–1)	15 – Wright	10 – Pearson	2 – Allen, Pearson	Hofstra Arena (2,703); Hempstead, NY
January 28, 2012; 2:00 pm, CSN		James Madison	W 89–79	18–5 (10–1)	29 – Pearson	15 – Pearson	4 – Allen	Patriot Center (8,014); Fairfax, VA
February 1, 2012; 7:00 pm		at Delaware	L 60–65	18–6 (10–2)	25 – Pearson	8 – Pearson	4 – Allen	Bob Carpenter Center (2,091); Newark, DE
February 4, 2012; 5:00 pm, ESPNU		Old Dominion; Homecoming	W 54–50	19–6 (11–2)	17 – Pearson	10 – Pearson	3 – Pearson	Patriot Center (9,840); Fairfax, VA
February 8, 2012; 7:00 pm, ESPN3		Hofstra	W 72–62	20–6 (12–2)	16 – Pearson	7 – Wright	7 – Edwards	Patriot Center (4,343); Fairfax, VA
February 11, 2012; 7:00 pm, MASN		at UNC Wilmington	W 75–69	21–6 (13–2)	16 – Wright	7 – Pearson	8 – Allen	Trask Coliseum (3,513); Wilmington, NC
February 14, 2012; 9:00 pm, CSN		VCU	W 62–61	22–6 (14–2)	24 – Pearson	11 – Pearson	5 – Allen	Patriot Center (6,734); Fairfax, VA
February 18, 2012*; 4:30 pm		Lamar; ESPN BracketBusters	W 75–71	23–6	17 – Pearson	10 – Pearson	4 – Pearson	Patriot Center (7,014); Fairfax, VA
February 22, 2012; 7:00 pm		at Northeastern	L 82–85 ^{OT}	23–7 (14–3)	19 – Morrison	6 – Morrison	13 – Allen	Matthews Arena (1,827); Boston, MA
February 25, 2012; 6:00 pm, ESPN2		at VCU	L 77–89	23–8 (14–4)	24 – Pearson	9 – Pearson, Morrison	4 – Morrison	Stuart C. Siegel Center (7,617); Richmond, VA
CAA tournament
March 3, 2012; 8:30 pm, Comcast Network	(3)	vs. (6) Georgia State; Quarterfinals	W 61–59	24–8	12 – Morrison	7 – Morrison	5 – Pearson	Richmond Coliseum (11,200); Richmond, VA
March 4, 2012; 4:30 pm, Comcast Network	(3)	vs. (2) VCU; Semifinals	L 64–74	24–9	20 – Morrison	11 – Morrison	3 – Allen, Wright	Richmond Coliseum (11,200); Richmond, VA
Notes: 1 - Denotes Daily Attendance
*Non-conference game. ^{#}Rankings from AP Poll. (#) Tournament seedings in parentheses. All times are in Eastern Time.

== Recruiting ==
The following is a list of players signed for the 2012–13 season:

College recruiting information
Name	Hometown	School	Height	Weight	Commit date
Marko Gujanicic; F	Cacak, Serbia	Stoneridge Prep	6 ft 9 in (2.06 m)	220 lb (100 kg)	Jan 29, 2012
Marko Gujanicic; F	Recruit ratings: No ratings found				
Patrick Holloway; PG	Stafford, VA	Paul VI	6 ft 1 in (1.85 m)	160 lb (73 kg)	Aug 4, 2011
Patrick Holloway; PG	Recruit ratings: Scout: Rivals: (83)				
Jalen Jenkins; F	Yonkers, NY	Cardinal Hayes	6 ft 7 in (2.01 m)	185 lb (84 kg)	Jun 9, 2012
Jalen Jenkins; F	Recruit ratings: (85)				
Overall recruit ranking:
Note: In many cases, Scout, Rivals, 247Sports, On3, and ESPN may conflict in their listings of height and weight.; In these cases, the average was taken. ESPN grades are on a 100-point scale.; Sources: "ESPN". ESPN.; "2012 Team Ranking". Rivals.
