= 2011–12 VCU Rams men's basketball team =

American college basketball season

2011–12 VCU Rams men's basketball
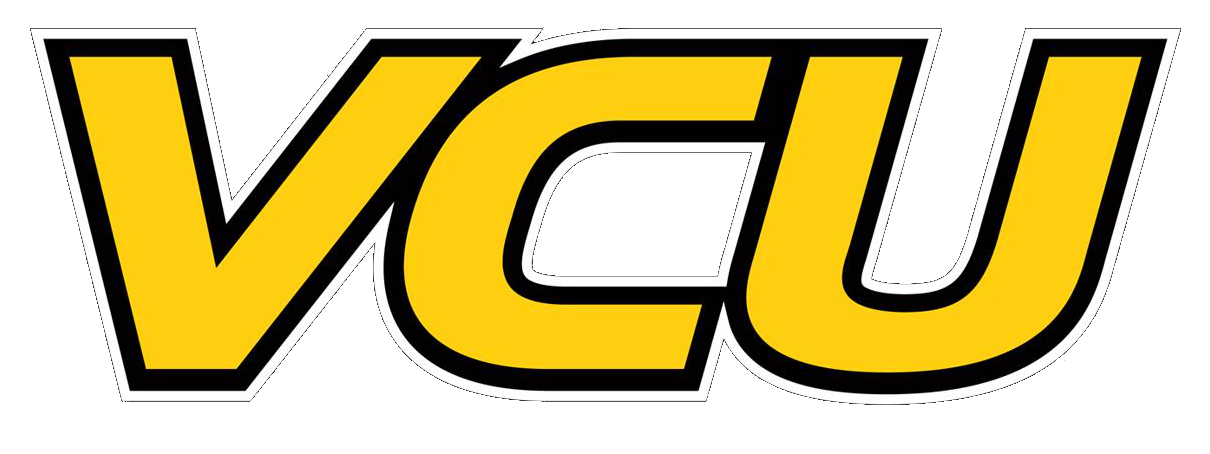

CAA tournament champions

NCAA tournament, Round of 32
- Conference: Colonial Athletic Association
- Record: 29–7 (15–3 CAA)
- Head coach: Shaka Smart (3rd year)
- Assistant coaches: Jamion Christian; Mike Rhoades; Will Wade
- Home arena: Stuart C. Siegel Center

2011–12 CAA men's basketball standings
| | Conf. | | | | Overall |
| Team | W | | L | PCT | W | | L | PCT |
|---|---|---|---|---|---|---|---|---|
| Drexel | 16 | – | 2 | .889 | 29 | – | 7 | .806 |
| VCU† | 15 | – | 3 | .833 | 29 | – | 7 | .806 |
| George Mason | 14 | – | 4 | .778 | 24 | – | 9 | .727 |
| Old Dominion | 13 | – | 5 | .722 | 21 | – | 13 | .618 |
| Delaware | 12 | – | 6 | .667 | 18 | – | 14 | .563 |
| Georgia State | 11 | – | 7 | .611 | 22 | – | 11 | .667 |
| Northeastern | 9 | – | 9 | .500 | 14 | – | 17 | .452 |
| James Madison | 5 | – | 13 | .278 | 12 | – | 20 | .375 |
| UNCW | 5 | – | 13 | .278 | 10 | – | 21 | .323 |
| William & Mary | 4 | – | 14 | .222 | 6 | – | 26 | .188 |
| Hofstra | 3 | – | 15 | .167 | 10 | – | 22 | .313 |
| Towson | 1 | – | 17 | .056 | 1 | – | 31 | .031 |
† 2012 CAA tournament winner Rankings from AP poll

The 2011–12 VCU Rams men's basketball team represented Virginia Commonwealth University during the 2011–12 NCAA Division I men's basketball season. It was the 44th season of the university fielding a men's basketball program. Led by third-year head coach Shaka Smart, the Rams were coming off a season marked by a run to the Final Four. Expected to finish lower in the CAA regular season standings, the Rams finished as regular season runners-up with a 15–3 conference record, before winning the 2012 CAA Men's Basketball Championship against Drexel, 59–56, earning their 11th ever berth into the NCAA Tournament. It was also the first season since 1984–85 that the Rams consecutively qualified for the NCAA Tournament.

During the NCAA Tournament, the Rams were the only CAA representative in the tournament and earned a 12-seed. The Rams upset Wichita State in the second round, before losing to Indiana in the Third Round.

== Preseason ==
VCU was predicted to finish third in the Colonial Athletic Association preseason polls, which were released October 18, 2011 in Arlington, Virginia. Senior guard/forward Bradford Burgess was selected to the preseason Colonial Athletic Association first team.

== 2011–12 incoming team members ==
=== 2011–12 team recruits ===
College recruiting
| Name | Hometown | School | Height | Weight | Commit date |
|---|---|---|---|---|---|
| Treveon Graham; SF | Washington, D.C. | St. Mary's Ryken (MD) | 6 ft 5 in (1.96 m) | 215 lb (98 kg) | Aug 19, 2010 |
| Treveon Graham; SF | Recruit ratings: Scout: Rivals: (86) | | | | |
| Jared Guest; PF | Columbia, South Carolina | Charis Prep. (NC) | 6 ft 8 in (2.03 m) | 205 lb (93 kg) | May 11, 2011 |
| Jared Guest; PF | Recruit ratings: Scout: Rivals: (Post) | | | | |
| Brianté Weber; PG | Chesapeake, VA | Fork Union Military Academy | 6 ft 2 in (1.88 m) | 165 lb (75 kg) | Jul 3, 2010 |
| Brianté Weber; PG | Recruit ratings: Scout: Rivals: (Post) | | | | |
| Teddy Okereafor; PG | London, England | Christchurch School | 6 ft 3 in (1.91 m) | 170 lb (77 kg) | Apr 19, 2011 |
| Teddy Okereafor; PG | Recruit ratings: Scout: Rivals: (90) | | | | |
Overall recruit ranking:
Note: In many cases, Scout, Rivals, 247Sports, On3, and ESPN may conflict in their listings of height and weight.; In these cases, the average was taken. ESPN grades are on a 100-point scale.; Sources: "VCU 2011 Basketball Commitments". Rivals.; "2011 VCU Basketball Commits". Scout.; "ESPN". ESPN.; "Scout.com Team Recruiting Rankings". Scout.; "2011 Team Ranking". Rivals.

== Roster ==
2011–12 VCU Rams men's basketball team
Players
Coaches

| Pos. | # | Name | Height | Weight | Year | Hometown |
|---|---|---|---|---|---|---|
| G | 2 | Brianté Weber | 6 ft 2 in (1.88 m) | 165 lb (75 kg) | Fr | Chesapeake, VA |
| G | 5 | Teddy Okereafor | 6 ft 3 in (1.91 m) | 190 lb (86 kg) | Fr | London, England |
| G | 10 | Darius Theus | 6 ft 3 in (1.91 m) | 190 lb (86 kg) | Jr | Portsmouth, VA |
| G | 11 | Rob Brandenberg | 6 ft 2 in (1.88 m) | 180 lb (82 kg) | So | Gahanna, Ohio |
| F | 15 | Juvonte Reddic | 6 ft 9 in (2.06 m) | 225 lb (102 kg) | So | Winston-Salem, NC |
| G/F | 20 | Bradford Burgess | 6 ft 6 in (1.98 m) | 225 lb (102 kg) | Sr | Midlothian, Virginia |
| G | 21 | Treveon Graham | 6 ft 5 in (1.96 m) | 215 lb (98 kg) | Fr | Washington, District of Columbia |
| F | 23 | Jarred Guest | 6 ft 8 in (2.03 m) | 210 lb (95 kg) | Fr | Columbia, South Carolina |
| F | 24 | Heath Houston | 6 ft 8 in (2.03 m) | 230 lb (104 kg) | Fr | Powder Springs, Georgia |
| G | 25 | Reco McCarter | 6 ft 7 in (2.01 m) | 190 lb (86 kg) | Fr | Goldsboro, North Carolina |
| G | 30 | Troy Daniels | 6 ft 4 in (1.93 m) | 200 lb (91 kg) | Jr | Roanoke, Virginia |
| C | 33 | D. J. Haley | 7 ft 0 in (2.13 m) | 250 lb (113 kg) | So | Palmdale, California |
| F | 34 | David Hinton | 6 ft 9 in (2.06 m) | 235 lb (107 kg) | Jr | Winston-Salem, North Carolina |

Head coach

Shaka Smart

Assistant coach(es)

- Mike Rhoades
- Will Wade

Legend

- (C) Team captain
- (S) Suspended
- (I) Ineligible
- (W) Walk-on
- Injured
- Current redshirt

Roster
Last update: July 25, 2011

== Accolades ==
=== Honors and awards ===
Senior guard/forward Bradford Burgess was named to the first team Colonial Athletic Association. Sophomore forward Juvonte Reddic and junior guard Darius Theus were named to the third team Colonial Athletic Association. Theus was also named to the Colonial Athletic Association all defensive team.

== Regular season ==
Prior to the start of the regular season, the men's basketball team played two preseason exhibitions. On November 3, the Rams defeated Cal U. Vulcans 71–48. Treveon Graham of the Rams led the team in scoring with 16 points.

The regular season began with the Rams hosting the Saint Francis Red Flash on November 11. In a close affair, the Rams earned a 63–57 victory over the Red Flash to open up the season. Despite the opening victory, the Rams lost their second two games of the season, both at neutral venues during the Charleston Classic, losing to Seton Hall and Georgia Tech. Against Tech, the Rams held an eight-point lead at halftime, before relinquishing the lead in the second half. Bradford Burgess led the Rams in scoring, with 17 points. Their final game of the Classic ended in a five-point victory over Western Kentucky Hilltoppers. On November 23, the Rams played the Hilltoppers again, this time in an intra-conference early season game, and still picked up a victory. Burgess once again led the Rams in scoring, with 16 points.

On November 27, 2011, the Rams traveled south to take on the Alabama Crimson Tide, their first nationally ranked opponent of the season. The Crimson Tide, who were NIT finalists the previous season, had gone off to a 6–0 start to the season, and were ranked thirteenth in the nation at the time of tip-off. The Crimson Tide were also coached by former Rams head coach Anthony Grant, who led the Rams to three NCAA Tournaments during his tenure. While the game was closely contested, the Tide pulled away late on to earn a 72–64 victory. Burgess led the Rams in scoring with 18 points. At the time, the 64 points scored by the Rams was the most points the Crimson Tide had allowed all season long.

From late November until early January, the Rams went on an eight-game winning streak, including victories over their intercity rivals, the Richmond Spiders and South Florida.

The Rams began Colonial Athletic Association conference play on December 17, 2011, by hosting the UNC Wilmington Seahawks. Despite having a 2–6 regular season record at the time, the Seahawks were on a two-game winning streak. The Rams, also on a two-game win-streak were able to dominate the majority of the game, earning an 87–64 victory of the Seahawks. Once again, Burgess led the Rams in scoring, tallying 22 points. Juvonte Reddic of the Rams led the team in rebounds, totaling nine off the glass. Darius Theus led the Rams with both assists and steals, accumulating eight assists and seven steals.

Following their conference opener against UNC Wilmington, the Rams played three more non-conference games to close out 2011. At their December 20 home game, the Rams posted a 68–49 victory over the UAB Blazers. Following the victory over the Blazers, the Rams travelled to games at UNC Greensboro and Akron, winning each affair. The December 29 victory at Akron was the Rams' first overtime game and victory of the season.

To open 2012, the Rams traveled up north to take conference foe, Hofstra. The January 2 game resulted in a 17-point victory for the Rams, making it, at the time, the largest road victory for VCU of the season. Two days later, the Rams hosted Georgia State, and suffered their first home loss of the season, falling 53–55 against the Panthers. The game was also the Rams' first defeat in CAA play. Their follow-up game at Drexel also resulted in a narrow defeat, as the Rams fell to the Dragons, 58–64.

For the next month, from January 11 – February 12, the Rams went on an eleven-game winning streak, improving their overall record to 22–5 and their conference record to 13–2. The record earned the Rams three votes in the AP Coaches' Poll, making them unofficially ranked 36th in the nation amongst Division I schools. Their winning streak came to end on February 14, when the Rams traveled north to take on their I-95 rivals, George Mason. The closely-knit affair saw the Rams lose 61–62 on a last-second three-pointer by George Mason's Sherrod Wight.

Following the one-point loss to George Mason, the Rams played their final non-conference game of the regular season against Northern Iowa in the ESPN BracketBusters series. Held at the Siegel Center, the Rams earned a 77–68 victory over the Panthers, giving the Rams a final non-conference regular-season record of 10–3. The Rams finished their conference schedule at home against George Mason. Following the narrow loss to George Mason in Fairfax, VCU beat George Mason 89–77 to end conference play at 15–3.

== Postseason ==
Finishing as the regular season runners-up, the Rams earned a direct bye to the quarterfinals of the 2012 CAA men's basketball tournament, where they earned the second seed in the tournament. Their conference tournament run began on March 3, 2012, when the Rams took on the Northeastern Huskies at the Richmond Coliseum in downtown Richmond, Virginia. The Rams won 75–65 and advanced to the semifinals against Mason. In the semifinals, the Rams took a 22-point lead against Mason, leading 22–0 before Mason successfully scored their first basket. Winning, again by a ten-point margin, 74–64, the Rams reached their second-consecutive CAA Championship, and their seventh in the past eleven years. In the CAA Championship, VCU took on Drexel, whom they lost to during the regular season. After leading by as many as sixteen in the second half, the Rams would weather a Drexel comeback, winning their fifth CAA tournament, 59–56.

On March 11, 2012, the Rams were announced by the NCAA Selection Committee as a #12 seed in the Southern Region, taking on Wichita State in the second round of the 2012 NCAA Division I men's basketball tournament. Wichita State, finished the season ranked #15 in the nation and won the previous year's National Invitation Tournament. Played in Portland, Oregon at the Rose Garden, the Rams took a 62–59 victory over Wichita State, sending them into the Third Round of the NCAA Tournament. The Rams led by as many as 13 points in the game. As the season came to a close, VCU was defeated in a heart breaker by Indiana in the third round of the NCAA tournament after Hoosiers came back from 6 down with 4 minutes to win 63–61 as VCU's three-point attempt bounced off the inside of the rim at the buzzer. The Rams' season finished with a 29–7 record.

== Schedule ==
| Date time, TV | Rank^{#} | Opponent^{#} | Result | Record | Site (attendance) city, state |
Preseason exhibitions
| November 3*; 7:30 pm | | California (Pa.) | W 71–48 | 0–0 | Stuart C. Siegel Center (6,675); Richmond, VA |
Regular season
| November 11*; 7:30 pm, ESPN3 | | Saint Francis | W 63–57 | 1–0 | Stuart C. Siegel Center (7,617); Richmond, VA |
| November 17*; 5:30 pm, ESPNU | | vs. Seton Hall; Charleston Classic | L 54–69 | 1–1 | Carolina First Arena (–); Charleston, SC |
| November 18*; 8:30 pm | | vs. Georgia Tech; Charleston Classic | L 60–73 | 1–2 | Carolina First Arena (4,528); Charleston, SC |
| November 20*; 8:30 pm, ESPN3 | | vs. WKU; Charleston Classic | W 69–64 | 2–2 | Carolina First Arena (2,455); Charleston, SC |
| November 23*; 7:00 pm | | at WKU | W 68–45 | 3–2 | E. A. Diddle Arena (3,285); Bowling Green, KY |
| November 27*; 9:30 pm, ESPNU | | at No. 13 Alabama | L 64–72 | 3–3 | Coleman Coliseum (10,500); Tuscaloosa, AL |
| November 30*; 7:30 pm, ESPN3 | | South Florida | W 69–46 | 4–3 | Stuart C. Siegel Center (7,617); Richmond, VA |
| December 4*; 2:30 pm, MASN | | vs. George Washington; BB&T Classic | W 75–60 | 5–3 | Verizon Center (–); Washington, D.C. |
| December 09*; 7:30 pm, ESPN2 | | Richmond; Farm Bureau Insurance Black & Blue Classic | W 73–51 | 6–3 | Stuart C. Siegel Center (7,617); Richmond, VA |
| December 17; 7:30 pm, ESPN3 | | UNC Wilmington | W 87–64 | 7–3 (1–0) | Stuart C. Siegel Center (7,617); Richmond, VA |
| December 20*; 7:30 pm, ESPN3 | | UAB | W 68–49 | 8–3 | Stuart C. Siegel Center (7,617); Richmond, VA |
| December 22*; 7:00 pm | | at UNC Greensboro | W 80–68 | 9–3 | Greensboro Coliseum (2,716); Greensboro, NC |
| December 29*; 7:00 pm | | at Akron | W 76–75 ^{OT} | 10–3 | James A. Rhodes Arena (3,993); Akron, OH |
| January 2; 7:00 pm | | at Hofstra | W 80–63 | 11–3 (2–0) | Hofstra Arena (1,612); Hempstead, NY |
| January 4; 7:30 pm | | Georgia State | L 53–55 | 11–4 (2–1) | Stuart C. Siegel Center (7,617); Richmond, VA |
| January 7; 8:00 pm, CSN | | at Drexel | L 58–64 | 11–5 (2–2) | Daskalakis Athletic Center (2,532); Philadelphia, PA |
| January 12; 6:00 pm, ESPNU | | James Madison | W 65–45 | 12–5 (3–2) | Stuart C. Siegel Center (7,617); Richmond, VA |
| January 14; 8:00 pm, TCN | | at Delaware | W 68–55 | 13–5 (4–2) | Bob Carpenter Center (3,568); Newark, DE |
| January 19; 8:00 pm, ESPNU | | William & Mary | W 69–68 ^{OT} | 14–5 (5–2) | Stuart C. Siegel Center (7,617); Richmond, VA |
| January 21; 8:00 pm, CSN | | Old Dominion | W 61–48 | 15–5 (6–2) | Stuart C. Siegel Center (7,617); Richmond, VA |
| January 23; 7:00 pm, CSN | | Hofstra | W 61–49 | 16–5 (7–2) | Stuart C. Siegel Center (7,617); Richmond, VA |
| January 25; 7:00 pm | | at Towson | W 67–42 | 17–5 (8–2) | Towson Center (974); Towson, MD |
| January 28; 2:00 pm | | at Georgia State | W 59–58 | 18–5 (9–2) | GSU Sports Arena (2,025); Atlanta, GA |
| February 1; 7:00 pm, CSN | | at William & Mary | W 87–78 | 19–5 (10–2) | William & Mary Hall (2,506); Williamsburg, VA |
| February 4; 7:00 pm, CSN | | Northeastern | W 59–56 | 20–5 (11–2) | Stuart C. Siegel Center (7,617); Richmond, VA |
| February 8; 7:30 pm, ESPN3 | | Towson | W 66–43 | 21–5 (12–2) | Stuart C. Siegel Center (7,617); Richmond, VA |
| February 11; 2:00 pm, CSN | | at Old Dominion | W 68–64 | 22–5 (13–2) | Ted Constant Convocation Center (8,742); Norfolk, VA |
| February 14; 9:00 pm, CSN | | at George Mason | L 61–62 | 22–6 (13–3) | Patriot Center (6,734); Fairfax, VA |
| February 17*; 7:00 pm, ESPN2 | | Northern Iowa; ESPN BracketBusters | W 77–68 | 23–6 | Stuart C. Siegel Center (7,617); Richmond, VA |
| February 22; 7:30 pm | | at UNC Wilmington | W 63–59 | 24–6 (14–3) | Trask Coliseum (3,514); Wilmington, NC |
| February 25; 6:00 pm, ESPN2 | | George Mason | W 89–77 | 25–6 (15–3) | Stuart C. Siegel Center (7,617); Richmond, VA |
2012 CAA men's basketball tournament
| March 3; 6:00 pm, TCN | (2) | vs. (7) Northeastern; Quarterfinals | W 75–65 | 26–6 | Richmond Coliseum (11,200); Richmond, VA |
| March 4; 4:30 pm, TCN/ESPN3 | (2) | vs. (3) George Mason; Semifinals | W 74–64 | 27–6 | Richmond Coliseum (11,200); Richmond, VA |
| March 5; 7:00 pm, ESPN | (2) | vs. (1) Drexel; Championship | W 59–56 | 28–6 | Richmond Coliseum (11,200); Richmond, VA |
2012 NCAA tournament
| March 15*; 7:15 pm, CBS | (12 S) | vs. (5 S) No. 18 Wichita State; Second Round | W 62–59 | 29–6 | Rose Garden (17,519); Portland, OR |
| March 17*; 7:10 pm, TBS | (12 S) | vs. (4 S) No. 16 Indiana; Third Round | L 61–63 | 29–7 | Rose Garden (17,337); Portland, OR |
*Non-conference game. ^{#}Rankings from AP Poll. (#) Tournament seedings in parentheses. All times are in Eastern Time (#) during NCAA Tournament is seed with Region.

== Statistics ==
| No. | Player | GP | GS | MPG | FG% | 3FG% | FT% | RPG | APG | SPG | BPG | PPG |
|---|---|---|---|---|---|---|---|---|---|---|---|---|
| 2 | Brianté Webber | 29 | 4 | 19.9 | .432 | .258 | .800 | 3.2 | 1.7 | 2.2 | 0.3 | 5.4 |
| 5 | Teddy Okereafor | 21 | 0 | 5.6 | .267 | .000 | .750 | 0.4 | 0.7 | 0.3 | 0.0 | 0.5 |
| 10 | Darius Theus | 29 | 29 | 31.2 | .452 | .264 | .646 | 2.4 | 4.8 | 1.6 | 0.3 | 8.7 |
| 11 | Rob Brandenberg | 29 | 15 | 25.1 | .337 | .287 | .681 | 2.7 | 1.9 | 1.1 | 0.6 | 8.3 |
| 15 | Juvonte Reddic | 29 | 28 | 27.5 | .517 | .000 | .701 | 6.8 | 0.6 | 1.4 | 1.2 | 10.4 |
| 20 | Bradford Burgess | 29 | 29 | 31.9 | .367 | .367 | .792 | 5.1 | 1.5 | 1.1 | 0.3 | 13.1 |
| 21 | Treveon Graham | 29 | 0 | 17.1 | .374 | .311 | .641 | 3.6 | 0.5 | 0.7 | 0.3 | 6.9 |
| 23 | Jarred Guest | 16 | 0 | 4.8 | .312 | .000 | 1.000 | 0.7 | 0.1 | 0.2 | 0.2 | 1.0 |
| 24 | Heath Houston | 10 | 1 | 3.8 | .600 | .--- | .--- | 0.6 | 0.0 | 0.1 | 0.2 | 0.6 |
| 25 | Reco McCarter | 10 | 0 | 1.6 | .400 | .500 | .250 | 0.2 | 0.0 | 0.2 | 0.0 | 0.6 |
| 30 | Troy Daniels | 29 | 13 | 23.4 | .367 | .379 | .816 | 3.4 | 0.6 | 1.2 | 0.1 | 9.9 |
| 33 | D.J. Haley | 29 | 26 | 15.5 | .536 | .--- | .333 | 3.9 | 0.3 | 0.6 | 0.6 | 3.4 |
| 34 | David Hinton | 17 | 0 | 2.6 | .500 | .--- | .000 | 0.2 | 0.0 | 0.1 | 0.1 | 0.2 |

Source: ESPN.com
Last updated: February 18, 2012
