= 2011–12 James Madison Dukes men's basketball team =

American college basketball season

2011–12 James Madison Dukes men's basketball
- Conference: Colonial Athletic Association
- Record: 12–20 (5–13 CAA)
- Head coach: Matt Brady (4th season)
- Assistant coaches: Rob O'Driscoll; Corey Stitzel; Bill Phillips; Louis Rowe
- Home arena: James Madison University Convocation Center

2011–12 CAA men's basketball standings
| | Conf. | | | | Overall |
| Team | W | | L | PCT | W | | L | PCT |
|---|---|---|---|---|---|---|---|---|
| Drexel | 16 | – | 2 | .889 | 29 | – | 7 | .806 |
| VCU† | 15 | – | 3 | .833 | 29 | – | 7 | .806 |
| George Mason | 14 | – | 4 | .778 | 24 | – | 9 | .727 |
| Old Dominion | 13 | – | 5 | .722 | 21 | – | 13 | .618 |
| Delaware | 12 | – | 6 | .667 | 18 | – | 14 | .563 |
| Georgia State | 11 | – | 7 | .611 | 22 | – | 11 | .667 |
| Northeastern | 9 | – | 9 | .500 | 14 | – | 17 | .452 |
| James Madison | 5 | – | 13 | .278 | 12 | – | 20 | .375 |
| UNCW | 5 | – | 13 | .278 | 10 | – | 21 | .323 |
| William & Mary | 4 | – | 14 | .222 | 6 | – | 26 | .188 |
| Hofstra | 3 | – | 15 | .167 | 10 | – | 22 | .313 |
| Towson | 1 | – | 17 | .056 | 1 | – | 31 | .031 |
† 2012 CAA tournament winner Rankings from AP poll

The 2011–12 James Madison Dukes men's basketball team represented James Madison University during the 2011–12 NCAA Division I men's basketball season. The Dukes, led by fourth year head coach Matt Brady, played their home games at the James Madison University Convocation Center as members of the Colonial Athletic Association. The Dukes completed the regular season 12–19, 5–13 in CAA play to finish tied for eighth place. As the eighth seed in the CAA tournament, the Dukes were defeated by UNC Wilmington 70–59 in the first round to end their season.

== Schedule ==
| Date time, TV | Rank^{#} | Opponent^{#} | Result | Record | Site (attendance) city, state |
Exhibition
| 10/26/2011*; 7:00 pm | | Philadelphia | W 98–88 | | JMU Convocation Center; Harrisonburg, Virginia |
Regular Season
| 11/13/2011*; 5:00 pm, Madizone | | Canisius | W 82–73 | 1–0 | JMU Convocation Center (3,170); Harrisonburg, VA |
| 11/19/2011*; 3:00 pm, La Salle Video | | at La Salle; Philly Hoop Group Classic | L 83–92 | 1–1 | Tom Gola Arena (2,951); Philadelphia, PA |
| 11/22/2011*; 7:00 pm, Madizone | | Robert Morris; Philly Hoop Group Classic | L 77–82 | 1–2 | JMU Convocation Center (2,752); Harrisonburg, VA |
| 11/25/2011*; 2:00 pm, TCN | | vs. Rider; Philly Hoop Group Classic | W 86–69 | 2–2 | The Palestra (6,843); Philadelphia, PA |
| 11/26/2011*; 7:00 pm, TCN | | at Penn; Philly Hoop Group Classic | W 60–58 | 3–2 | The Palestra (2,824); Philadelphia, PA |
| 12/3/2011; 4:00 pm | | at Hofstra | W 62–60 | 4–2 (1–0) | Mack Sports Complex (2,713); Hempstead, NY |
| 12/6/2011*; 7:00 pm | | Kent State | L 51–71 | 4–3 | JMU Convocation Center (3,103); Harrisonburg, VA |
| 12/19/2011*; 7:00 pm, Madizone | | The Citadel | W 67–49 | 5–3 | JMU Convocation Center (3,150); Harrisonburg, VA |
| 12/22/2011*; 7:00 pm | | at George Washington | W 62–57 | 6–3 | Charles E. Smith Center (2,265); Washington, DC |
| 12/29/2011*; 9:30 pm | | vs. Rhode Island; UCF Holiday Classic | L 60–79 | 6–4 | UCF Arena (4,894); Orlando, FL |
| 12/30/2011*; 9:30 pm | | vs. Stetson; UCF Holiday Classic | W 71–69 | 7–4 | UCF Arena (5,230); Orlando, FL |
| 1/2/2012; 3:00 pm, Madizone | | Old Dominion; Rivalry | L 61–67 | 7–5 (1–1) | JMU Convocation Center (3,815); Harrisonburg, VA |
| 1/4/2012; 7:00 pm | | at William & Mary | L 61–68 | 7–6 (1–2) | Kaplan Arena (2,402); Williamsburg, VA |
| 1/7/2012; 2:00 pm, Madizone | | Northeastern | L 56–68 | 7–7 (1–3) | JMU Convocation Center (3,322); Harrisonburg, VA |
| 1/9/2012*; 7:00 pm, Madizone | | Hampton | W 74–67 | 8–7 | JMU Convocation Center (3,017); Harrisonburg, VA |
| 1/12/2012; 6:00 pm, ESPNU | | at VCU | L 45–65 | 8–8 (1–4) | Siegel Center (7,617); Richmond, VA |
| 1/14/2012; 7:00 pm | | George Mason | L 83–89 | 8–9 (1–5) | JMU Convocation Center (4,312); Harrisonburg, VA |
| 1/14/2012; 7:00 pm | | at UNC Wilmington | W 69–61 | 9–9 (2–5) | Trask Coliseum (3,642); Wilmington, NC |
| 1/21/2012; 4:00 pm | | Hofstra | L 69–71 | 9–10 (2–6) | JMU Convocation Center (4,025); Harrisonburg, VA |
| 1/23/2012; 7:00 pm | | at Georgia State | L 58–74 | 9–11 (2–7) | GSU Sports Arena (1,010); Atlanta, GA |
| 1/26/2012; 8:00 pm, CSN | | William & Mary | W 59–47 | 10–11 (3–7) | JMU Convocation Center (3,215); Harrisonburg, VA |
| 1/28/2012; 2:00 pm, CSN | | at George Mason | L 79–89 | 10–12 (3–8) | Patriot Center (8,014); Fairfax, VA |
| 1/30/2012*; 7:00 pm | | at East Tennessee State | L 56–70 | 10–13 | MSHA Athletic Center (3,103); Johnson City, TN |
| 2/2/2012; 7:00 pm, CSN | | at Old Dominion; Rivalry | L 71–80 | 10–14 (3–9) | Constant Convocation Center (8,472); Norfolk, VA |
| 2/4/2012; 2:00 pm, TCN | | Delaware | L 80–85 | 10–15 (3–10) | JMU Convocation Center (4,625); Harrisonburg, VA |
| 2/8/2012; 7:00 pm, Madizone | | Drexel | L 56–63 | 10–16 (3–11) | JMU Convocation Center (3,143); Harrisonburg, VA |
| 2/11/2012; 7:00 pm, Madizone | | at Towson | W 58–56 | 11–16 (4–11) | Towson Center Arena (1,364); Towson, MD |
| 2/14/2012; 7:00 pm, ESPN3 | | Georgia State | L 64–67 | 11–17 (4–12) | JMU Convocation Center (1,364); Harrisonburg, VA |
| 2/18/2012*; 2:00 pm, ESPN3 | | at Detroit Mercy; Sears Bracketbusters | L 70–82 | 11–18 | Calihan Hall (2,017); Detroit, MI |
| 2/22/2012; 7:00 pm, ESPNU | | at Drexel | L 61–78 | 11–19 (4–13) | Daskalakis Athletic Center (2,532); Philadelphia, PA |
| 2/25/2012; 4:00 pm, Madizone | | Towson | W 65–59 | 12–19 (5–13) | JMU Convocation Center (3,774); Harrisonburg, VA |
CAA tournament
| 2/25/2012; 4:00 pm, CAA Video | (8) | vs. (9) UNC Wilmington | L 59–70 | 12–20 | Richmond Coliseum; Richmond, VA |
*Non-conference game. ^{#}Rankings from AP Poll. (#) Tournament seedings in parentheses. All times are in Eastern Time.
