= 2011–12 Georgia State Panthers men's basketball team =

American college basketball season

2011–12 Georgia State Panthers men's basketball
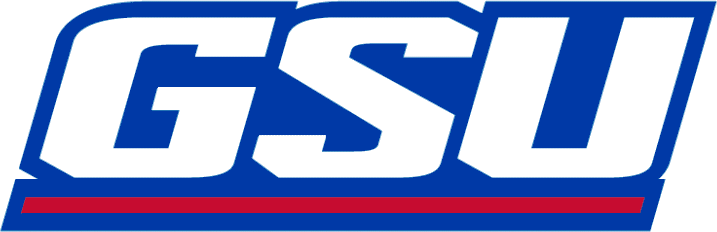

CIT, Second Round, vs. Mercer, L 59–64
- Conference: Colonial Athletic Association
- Record: 22–12 (11–7 CAA)
- Head coach: Ron Hunter (1st season)
- Assistant coaches: Darryl LaBarrie (1st season); Everick Sullivan (1st season); Claude Pardue (1st season)
- Home arena: GSU Sports Arena

2011–12 CAA men's basketball standings
	Conf.				Overall
Team	W		L	PCT	W		L	PCT
Drexel	16	–	2	.889	29	–	7	.806
VCU†	15	–	3	.833	29	–	7	.806
George Mason	14	–	4	.778	24	–	9	.727
Old Dominion	13	–	5	.722	21	–	13	.618
Delaware	12	–	6	.667	18	–	14	.563
Georgia State	11	–	7	.611	22	–	11	.667
Northeastern	9	–	9	.500	14	–	17	.452
James Madison	5	–	13	.278	12	–	20	.375
UNCW	5	–	13	.278	10	–	21	.323
William & Mary	4	–	14	.222	6	–	26	.188
Hofstra	3	–	15	.167	10	–	22	.313
Towson	1	–	17	.056	1	–	31	.031
† 2012 CAA tournament winner Rankings from AP poll

The 2011–12 Georgia State Panthers men's basketball team represented Georgia State University during the 2011–12 NCAA Division I men's basketball season. The team's head coach was Ron Hunter in first season at GSU. They played their home games at GSU Sports Arena and are members of the Colonial Athletic Association (CAA). They finished the season 21–12, 11–7 in CAA play to finish in sixth place. They lost in the quarterfinals of the CAA Basketball tournament to George Mason. They were invited to the 2012 CollegeInsider.com Tournament where they defeated Tennessee Tech in the first round before falling in the second round to eventual tournament winner Mercer.

== Season notes ==
- During the November 29 away game at South Carolina State, Georgia State set a record margin of victory at any away game of 31 points.
- On the December 1 game against FIU, Georgia State set a school record of 14 rejections (blocked shots). The previous record was 12 on January 29, 2000 against Troy.
- During the 2011–12 season, the schools winning streak record was extended to 11 consecutive games ranging from the November 18th game against McNeese State game to the January 4th game against VCU.
- Eric Buckner set the career blocks record for the university at 167.
- Eric Buckner set the season blocks record for the university at 117.
- Jihad Ali set the career-games played record at 126 games.
- During the CAA tournament, Georgia State set the tournament record for largest margin of victory against Hofstra at 35 points.

== Roster ==
2011–12 Georgia State Panthers men's basketball team
Players
Coaches

Pos.	#	Name	Height	Weight	Year	Hometown
F	14	Jihad Ali	6 ft 5 in (1.96 m)	200 lb (91 kg)	RS Sr	Atlanta, GA
F	20	Eric Buckner	6 ft 10 in (2.08 m)	210 lb (95 kg)	Sr	Ehrhardt, SC
G	4	James Fields	6 ft 3 in (1.91 m)	192 lb (87 kg)	Sr	Savannah, GA
F	24	Brandon McGee	6 ft 7 in (2.01 m)	220 lb (100 kg)	RS Sr	Chicago, IL
G/F	23	Josh Micheaux	6 ft 6 in (1.98 m)	211 lb (96 kg)	Sr	Missouri City, TX
F	55	Jamar Taylor	6 ft 9 in (2.06 m)	225 lb (102 kg)	RS Sr	Charleston, SC
C	22	James Vincent	6 ft 10 in (2.08 m)	250 lb (113 kg)	Jr	Columbus, GA
G	25	Rashaad Richardson	6 ft 4 in (1.93 m)	190 lb (86 kg)	So	James Island, SC
G	10	Devonta White	5 ft 10 in (1.78 m)	158 lb (72 kg)	So	Alpharetta, GA
G	15	Tyler Gamble	6 ft 2 in (1.88 m)	195 lb (88 kg)	Fr	Commerce, GA
F	34	Justin Green	6 ft 5 in (1.96 m)	205 lb (93 kg)	Fr	Jonesboro, GA
G	21	Ryann Green	6 ft 1 in (1.85 m)	171 lb (78 kg)	Fr	College Park, GA
G	11	Tony Kimbro Jr.	6 ft 5 in (1.96 m)	185 lb (84 kg)	Fr	Louisville, KY

Head coach

- Ron Hunter (Miami (Ohio))

Assistant coach(es)

- Darryl LaBarrie (Georgia Tech)
- Everick Sullivan (Louisville)
- Claude Pardue (Emory)

Legend

- (C) Team captain
- (S) Suspended
- (I) Ineligible
- (W) Walk-on
- Injured
- Current redshirt

== Class of 2012 commitments ==
College recruiting information
Name	Hometown	School	Height	Weight	Commit date
R. J. Hunter; SG	Indianapolis, IN	Pike High School	6 ft 5 in (1.96 m)	180 lb (82 kg)	May 26, 2011
R. J. Hunter; SG	Recruit ratings: Scout: Rivals: (84)				
T. J. Shipes; PF	Buford, GA	Buford High School	6 ft 8 in (2.03 m)	220 lb (100 kg)	Oct 17, 2011
T. J. Shipes; PF	Recruit ratings: Rivals: (40)				
LaRon Smith; PF	Palm Bay, FL	Heritage High School	6 ft 8 in (2.03 m)	210 lb (95 kg)	
LaRon Smith; PF	Recruit ratings: No ratings found				
Cameron Solomon; SG	Hampton, GA	Brevard Community College	6 ft 4 in (1.93 m)	175 lb (79 kg)	
Cameron Solomon; SG	Recruit ratings: No ratings found				
David Travers; PG	Carlsbad, CA	La Costa Canyon High School	6 ft 1 in (1.85 m)	165 lb (75 kg)	Aug 18, 2011
David Travers; PG	Recruit ratings: (79)				
Curtis Washington; F	Elizabethtown, KY	Elizabethtown High School	6 ft 10 in (2.08 m)	245 lb (111 kg)	
Curtis Washington; F	Recruit ratings: Rivals: (87)				
Overall recruit ranking:
Note: In many cases, Scout, Rivals, 247Sports, On3, and ESPN may conflict in their listings of height and weight.; In these cases, the average was taken. ESPN grades are on a 100-point scale.; Sources: "ESPN". ESPN.; "2012 Team Ranking". Rivals.

== Schedule ==
Date time, TV	Rank^{#}	Opponent^{#}	Result	Record	Site city, state
Exhibition
October 31, 2011*; 7:00 pm		Southern Poly	W 90–65		GSU Sports Arena; Atlanta, GA
November 5, 2011*; 7:00 pm		Oglethorpe	W 90–49		GSU Sports Arena; Atlanta, GA
Regular Season
November 12, 2011*; 5:00 pm		at Washington; World Vision Classic	L 74–91	0–1	Hec Edmundson Pavilion (8,465); Seattle, WA
November 13, 2011*; 5:30 pm		vs. Portland; World Vision Classic	L 61–66	0–2	Hec Edmundson Pavilion (7,972); Seattle, WA
November 14, 2011*; 7:00 pm		vs. Florida Atlantic; World Vision Classic	L 77–84	0–3	Hec Edmundson Pavilion (7,918); Seattle, WA
November 18, 2011*; 7:00 pm		McNeese State	W 69–50	1–3	GSU Sports Arena (1,370); Atlanta, GA
November 22, 2011*; 8:00 pm		at Samford	W 55–47	2–3	Pete Hanna Center (482); Homewood, AL
November 26, 2011*; 8:00 pm		Liberty	W 72–50	3–3	GSU Sports Arena (803); Atlanta, GA
November 29th, 2011*; 7:30 pm		at South Carolina State	W 85–54	4–3	SHM Memorial Center (324); Orangeburg, SC
December 1, 2011*; 7:00 pm		FIU	W 73–47	5–3	GSU Sports Arena (1,674); Atlanta, GA
December 3, 2011; 2:00 pm		William & Mary	W 66–34	6–3 (1–0)	GSU Sports Arena (711); Atlanta, GA
December 10, 2011*; 2:00 pm		Rhode Island	W 96–64	7–3	GSU Sports Arena (946); Atlanta, GA
December 17, 2011*; 9:00 pm, FCS Pacific		at Utah Valley	W 71–68	8–3	UCCU Center (3,088); Orem, UT
December 22, 2011*; 7:00 pm		Georgia Southern	W 72–52	9–3	GSU Sports Arena (1,937); Atlanta, GA
January 2, 2012; 7:00 pm		Drexel	W 58–44	10–3 (2–0)	GSU Sports Arena (872); Atlanta, GA
January 4, 2012; 7:30 pm, ESPN3		at VCU	W 55–53	11–3 (3–0)	Stuart C. Siegel Center (7,617); Richmond, VA
January 7, 2012; 12:00 pm, CSS		at George Mason	L 58–61	11–4 (3–1)	Patriot Center (5,191); Fairfax, VA
January 12, 2012; 7:00 pm, CSS		UNC Wilmington; Barefoot for Bare Feet	W 75–61	12–4 (4–1)	GSU Sports Arena (2,698); Atlanta, GA
January 14, 2012; 2:00 pm, ESPN 3		Towson	W 57–42	13–4 (5–1)	GSU Sports Arena (1,107); Atlanta, GA
January 18, 2012; 7:00 pm		at Northeastern	L 57–60	13–5 (5–2)	Matthews Arena (1,227); Boston, MA
January 21, 2012; 2:00 pm		at Delaware	L 74–77 ^{2OT}	13–6 (5–3)	Bob Carpenter Center (3,773); Newark, DE
January 23, 2012; 7:00 pm		James Madison	W 74–58	14–6 (6–3)	GSU Sports Arena (1,010); Atlanta, GA
January 25, 2012; 7:00 pm		at Drexel	L 46–68	14–7 (6–4)	Daskalakis Athletic Center (2,017); Philadelphia, PA
January 28, 2012; 4:00 pm, CSS		VCU	L 58–59	14–8 (6–5)	GSU Sports Arena (2,025); Atlanta, GA
February 1, 2012; 7:00 pm		at UNC Wilmington	W 68–53	15–8 (7–5)	Trask Coliseum (3,075); Wilmington, NC
February 4, 2012; 4:00 pm, FiOS1		at Hofstra	W 59–43	16–8 (8–5)	Hofstra Arena (3,815); Hempstead, NY
February 8, 2012; 7:00 pm		Northeastern	W 61–59	17–8 (9–5)	GSU Sports Arena (1,463); Atlanta, GA
February 11, 2012; 2:00 pm		Delaware	L 77–80 ^{OT}	17–9 (9–6)	GSU Sports Arena (1,751); Atlanta, GA
February 14, 2012; 7:00 pm, ESPN3		at James Madison	W 67–64	18–9 (10–6)	James Madison University Convocation Center (2,899); Harrisonburg, VA
February 18, 2012*; 7:00 pm		UTSA; Sears BracketBusters	W 82–71	19–9	GSU Sports Arena (922); Atlanta, GA
February 22, 2012; 7:00 pm		Old Dominion	L 60–65	19–10 (10–7)	GSU Sports Arena (2,403); Atlanta, GA
February 25, 2012; 2:00 pm		at William & Mary	W 64–60	20–10 (11–7)	William & Mary Hall (2,056); Williamsburg, VA
CAA Tournament
March 2, 2012; 8:30 pm		vs. Hofstra first round	W 85–50	21–10	Richmond Coliseum (5,263); Richmond, VA
March 3, 2012; 8:30 pm, TCN, CSS		vs. George Mason; Quarterfinals	L 59–61	21–11	Richmond Coliseum (11,200); Richmond, VA
CollegeInsider.com Tournament
March 13, 2012*; 7:00 pm		Tennessee Tech first round	W 74–43	22–11	GSU Sports Arena (1,509); Atlanta, GA
March 17, 2012*; 4:00 pm		at Mercer second round	L 59–64	22–12	The University Center (2,132); Macon, GA
*Non-conference game. ^{#}Rankings from AP Poll. (#) Tournament seedings in parentheses. All times are in Eastern Time.
