= Damion Lee =

American basketball player (born 1992)

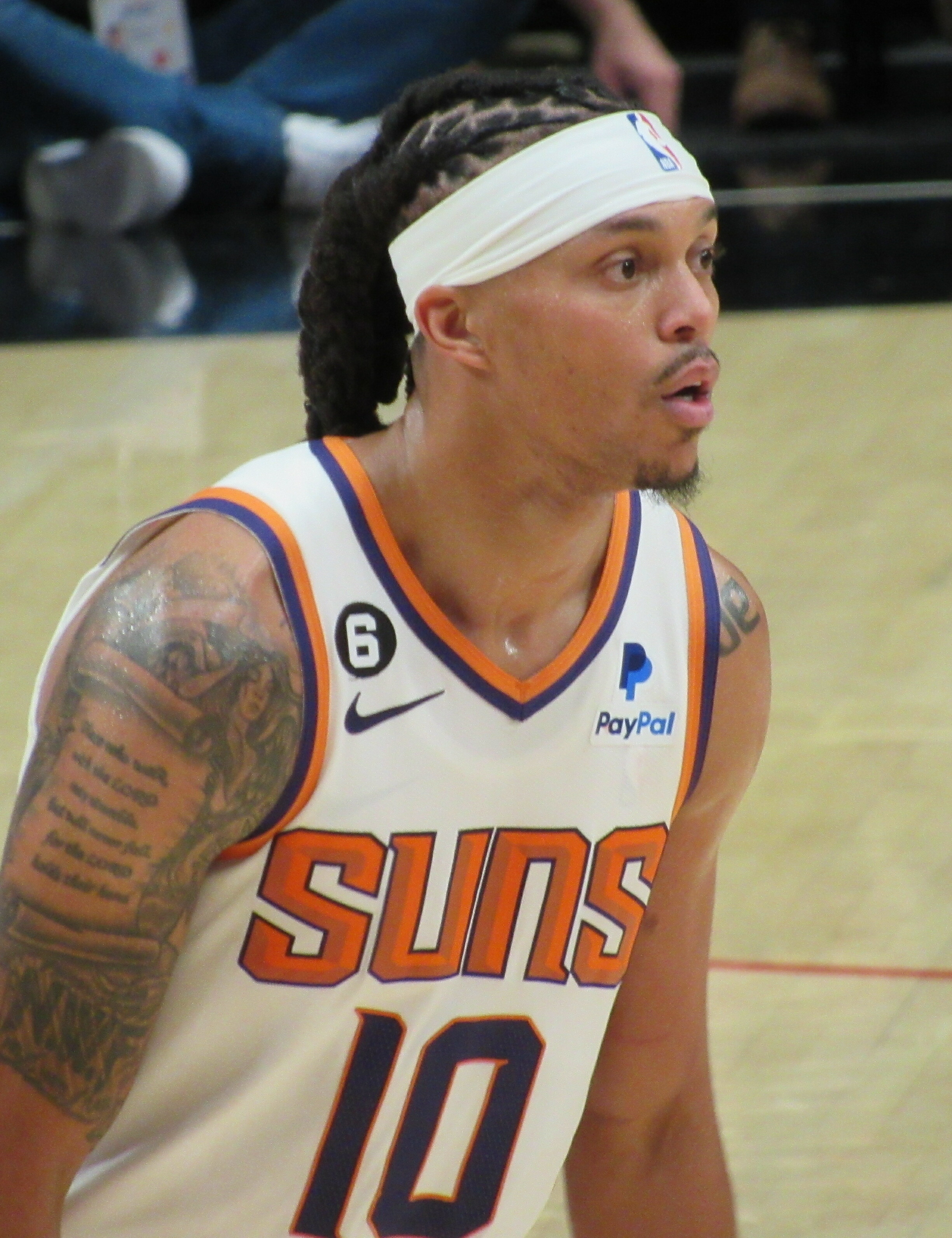
- Lee with the Phoenix Suns in 2022

Personal information
- Born: October 21, 1992 (age 34) Baltimore, Maryland, U.S.
- Listed height: 6 ft 6 in (1.98 m)
- Listed weight: 210 lb (95 kg)

Career information
- High school: Calvert Hall (Towson, Maryland); St. Thomas More (Oakdale, Connecticut)
- College: Drexel (2011–2015); Louisville (2015–2016)
- NBA draft: 2016: undrafted
- Playing career: 2016–2025
- Position: Shooting guard / small forward
- Number: 8, 1, 10

Career history
- 2016–2017: Maine Red Claws
- 2017–2018: Santa Cruz Warriors
- 2018: Atlanta Hawks
- 2018–2020: →Santa Cruz Warriors
- 2018–2022: Golden State Warriors
- 2022–2025: Phoenix Suns
- 2025: Ironi Ness Ziona

Career highlights
- NBA champion (2022); Second-team All-ACC (2016); First-team All-CAA (2015); Second-team All-CAA (2013); CAA All-Defensive Team (2015); CAA Rookie of the Year (2012)

Career NBA statistics
- Points: 2,467 (7.8 ppg)
- Rebounds: 1,002 (3.2 rpg)
- Assists: 421 (1.3 apg)
- Stats at NBA.com
- Stats at Basketball Reference

Damion Lee (born October 21, 1992) is an American former professional basketball player. He played college basketball for four years at Drexel University and transferred to Louisville for his final year of eligibility. After going undrafted in 2016, Lee played in the G League before signing with the Atlanta Hawks in March 2018. He then signed a two-way contract with the Golden State Warriors the following season, winning an NBA championship with the team in 2022. He has also played for the Phoenix Suns and Ironi Ness Ziona.

== High school career ==
Lee graduated from Calvert Hall College High School in Towson, Maryland, where in his final season he was a Second-Team Baltimore Sun All-Metro and a First-Team All-Baltimore Catholic League selection. Lee attended prep school at St. Thomas More in Oakdale, Connecticut, where he averaged 17 points, 6 rebounds and 5 assists per game during the 2010–11 season. He was also teammates with future NBA player Andre Drummond. Lee was a First Team All-New England Preparatory School Athletic Council selection, leading his team to a 30–7 record and the National Prep School Championship.

== College career ==
=== Drexel Dragons ===
In his freshman season as a member of the 2011–12 Drexel Dragons men's basketball team, Lee started at point guard. During that season, he averaged 12 points and 4.4 rebounds. After the impressive start to his college career, he was named the Colonial Athletic Association (CAA) Rookie of the Year. He was also named to the CAA All-Tournament team after averaging more than 15 points in Drexel's three tournament games. In the CAA championship game, the Dragons (25–5) lost to Virginia Commonwealth University, 59–56. VCU was a Final Four team the previous year, and the majority of projections had both teams making the NCAA tournament. However, a disappointing Selection Sunday saw the Dragons not invited to the NCAA Tournament and instead accepting an automatic bid to the 2012 National Invitation Tournament as the CAA regular season champion and #3 seed. The Dragons defeated the University of Central Florida and Northern Iowa, before falling to the University of Massachusetts in the regional final.

The following season, Lee was named to the Second-Team All-CAA after leading Drexel in scoring and finishing third in the CAA averaging 17.1 points per game. He was also second in the CAA in free throw percentage (82.9%), and fourth in three-pointers per game (2.3). In a game against Old Dominion, Lee recorded a career-high 34 points.

In his third season at Drexel, after being selected to the Preseason CAA All-Conference First Team, Lee suffered a torn ACL in a game against Arizona. This caused him to sit out the entire season and redshirt his junior year.

Before his redshirt junior season at Drexel, Lee was named to the Preseason CAA All-Conference First Team for the second year in a row. He also was named to the Charleston Classic All-Tournament team. On February 21, 2015, during a game against Northeastern, Lee suffered a fractured right hand which prematurely ended his season. Lee averaged 21.4 points per game during the season, ranking fourth in the nation and first in the CAA. His free throw percentage of 88.7% ranked 14th in the nation and second in the CAA. He also averaged 6.1 rebounds and 2.3 assists per game in 27 games. Furthermore, Lee also led the team in steals per game (1.5), field goal percentage (43.8%), and three-point percentage (38.5%%). At the conclusion of the regular season, Lee was one vote shy of winning CAA Player of the Year, losing to Senior William and Mary guard Marcus Thornton. However, Lee did win awards in CAA All-Conference First Team, CAA All-Defensive Team, and CAA All-Academic Team.

On March 30, 2015, Lee announced that he would be transferring out of Drexel University for his fifth and final collegiate season. He was considered to be the top transfer in college basketball by ESPN.

=== Louisville Cardinals ===
On April 23, 2015, Lee announced he would play his final collegiate season at Louisville under head coach Rick Pitino. Other schools Lee was considering included Arizona, Gonzaga, Marquette, and Maryland. Lee said after the move, "The U of L community itself was unreal. I don't think there's any other city or college basketball town like it." By mid-season in December 2015, he was Louisville's top point scorer. He was named to the 35-man midseason watchlist for the Naismith Trophy on February 11, 2016. On Senior Night, Lee passed the 2,000-point mark. With 10 games remaining in the season, Louisville, ranked as the 13th-best team in the country, announced a self-imposed postseason ban for the 2015–16 season amid an ongoing NCAA investigation involving recruits between 2010 and 2014. They finished the regular season as the #16 ranked team with a 23–8 record, and did not play in the ACC Tournament or the NCAA Tournament because of the ban.

== Professional career ==
=== Maine Red Claws (2016–2017) ===
After going undrafted in the 2016 NBA draft, Lee joined the Miami Heat for the 2016 NBA Summer League. On September 26, 2016, he signed with the Boston Celtics. He was later waived by the Celtics on October 20 after appearing in two preseason games. On October 31, he was acquired by the Maine Red Claws of the NBA Development League as an affiliate player of the Celtics. On January 10, 2017, he was waived by the Red Claws after suffering a season-ending injury. In 16 games, he averaged 17.8 points, 6.3 rebounds, 3.4 assists and 1.1 steals in 34 minutes.

=== Santa Cruz Warriors (2017–2018) ===
On August 24, 2017, Lee was traded to the Santa Cruz Warriors of the NBA G League.

=== Atlanta Hawks (2018) ===
On March 13, 2018, Lee signed a 10-day contract with the Atlanta Hawks. On March 23, the Atlanta Hawks signed Lee to a second 10-day contract. On April 2, the Hawks signed Lee for the remainder of the season. He made 15 total appearances (including 11 starts) for Atlanta, averaging 10.7 points, 4.7 rebounds, and 1.9 assists.

=== Golden State Warriors (2018–2022) ===
On July 14, 2018, Lee signed a two-way contract with the Golden State Warriors, which would lead him to return to the Santa Cruz Warriors. Lee played in 32 games off of the bench for the Warriors during the 2018–19 NBA season, recording averages of 4.9 points, 2.0 rebounds, and 0.4 assists.

On July 31, 2019, the Golden State Warriors re-signed with Lee on another two-way contract. On October 28, Lee recorded a double-double with a career-high 23 points, 11 rebounds, and two assists in a 134–123 road victory over the New Orleans Pelicans. On December 25, Lee logged his second double-double of the season with 22 points and a career-high 15 rebounds in a 116–104 win against the Houston Rockets. Lee picked up ample playing time due to a litany of injuries that befell the Warriors' roster (including a hand fracture in November that cost Lee 14 games) and burned through the 45-day allotment with the NBA team on his two-way contract. On January 15, 2020, the Golden State Warriors signed Lee to a multi-year contract. He made 49 total appearances (including 36 starts) for the Warriors during the 2019–20 season, averaging 12.7 points, 4.9 rebounds, and 2.7 assists.

On December 27, 2020, Lee put up 12 points, alongside a game-winning three-pointer, in a 129–128 win over the Chicago Bulls. Lee recorded 57 appearances (including one start) for Golden State during the 2020–21 season, posting averages of 6.5 points, 3.2 rebounds, and 1.3 assists.

Lee made 63 appearances (including five starts) for the Warriors during the 2021–22 season, recording averages of 7.4 points, 3.2 rebounds, and 1.0 assists. On June 16, 2022, Lee won the 2022 NBA Finals with the Warriors in six games over the Boston Celtics.

=== Phoenix Suns (2022–2025) ===
On July 7, 2022, Lee signed with the Phoenix Suns. On October 19, Lee made his Suns debut, putting up 11 points, two rebounds, two assists, and an off-balance, game-winning baseline jumper in a 107–105 win over the Dallas Mavericks. On January 13, 2023, Lee scored a career-high 31 points off the bench in a close 121–116 loss to the Minnesota Timberwolves. He made 74 appearances (including five starts) for Phoenix during the 2022–23 season, averaging 8.2 points, 3.0 rebounds, and 1.3 assists.

During training camp prior to the 2023–24 NBA season, Lee injured his right meniscus which ultimately resulted in surgery. The meniscus tear would later cause him to miss the season in recovery. Lee would later reveal that the meniscus tear turned out to be a rare double root tear that required an extended recovery period for him, which caused him to suffer from depression to the point of needing to seek therapy at the time.

On July 6, 2024, Lee re-signed with the Suns. He made 25 appearances off of the bench for Phoenix in the 2024–25 NBA season, averaging 3.3 points, 0.8 rebounds, and 0.4 assists. Lee's final NBA game was played on April 13, 2025. On that day, the Suns were defeated 109–98 by the Sacramento Kings, where Lee played for five and a half minutes and recorded four points and one rebound.

=== Ironi Ness Ziona (2025) ===
On August 23, 2025, Lee signed with the Israeli team Ironi Ness Ziona for the 2025–26 season. He played in three games for the team, averaging 7.0 points in 22.7 minutes, and shooting 29.2% from the field. On December 28, it was reported that Lee was parting ways with the team.

On May 12, 2026, Lee announced his retirement from professional basketball.

== National team career ==
On February 22, 2018, Lee was added to the United States national team for the 2019 FIBA Basketball World Cup qualification.

== Career statistics ==
Legend
GP	Games played	GS	Games started	MPG	Minutes per game
FG%	Field goal percentage	3P%	3-point field goal percentage	FT%	Free throw percentage
RPG	Rebounds per game	APG	Assists per game	SPG	Steals per game
BPG	Blocks per game	PPG	Points per game	**Bold**	Career high
†	Won an NBA championship

=== NBA ===
==== Regular season ====
Year	Team	GP	GS	MPG	FG%	3P%	FT%	RPG	APG	SPG	BPG	PPG
2017–18	Atlanta	15	11	26.9	.408	.250	.759	4.7	1.9	**1.3**	**.1**	10.7
2018–19	Golden State	32	0	11.7	.441	.397	.864	2.0	.4	.4	.0	4.9
2019–20	Golden State	49	**36**	**29.0**	.417	.356	.873	**4.9**	**2.7**	1.0	**.1**	**12.7**
2020–21	Golden State	57	1	18.9	**.467**	.397	.909	3.2	1.3	.7	**.1**	6.5
2021–22†	Golden State	63	5	19.9	.441	.337	.880	3.2	1.0	.6	**.1**	7.4
2022–23	Phoenix	**74**	5	20.4	.442	**.445**	.904	3.0	1.3	.4	**.1**	8.2
2024–25	Phoenix	25	0	5.8	.365	.243	**.952**	.8	.4	.2	.0	3.3
Career		315	58	19.6	.433	.374	.881	3.2	1.3	.6	.1	7.8

==== Playoffs ====
Year	Team	GP	GS	MPG	FG%	3P%	FT%	RPG	APG	SPG	BPG	PPG
2022†	Golden State	**16**	0	7.8	**.382**	**.250**	.667	**1.6**	.4	.1	.0	2.0
2023	Phoenix	8	0	**11.1**	.300	.200	**1.000**	1.4	**.6**	**.3**	.0	**2.1**
Career		24	0	8.9	.352	.226	.800	1.5	.5	.1	.0	2.0

=== College ===
Year	Team	GP	GS	MPG	FG%	3P%	FT%	RPG	APG	SPG	BPG	PPG
2011–12	Drexel	**36**	**35**	28.9	**.454**	.375	.773	4.4	1.7	.8	**.3**	12.0
2012–13	Drexel	27	24	33.0	.425	.360	.829	5.1	1.8	.8	.1	17.1
2013–14	Drexel	5	5	26.8	.370	.273	.864	4.2	2.2	.6	.2	13.0
2014–15	Drexel	27	27	**38.1**	.438	**.385**	**.887**	**6.1**	**2.3**	**1.5**	**.3**	**21.4**
2015–16	Louisville	30	30	33.6	.428	.341	.843	3.9	2.0	**1.5**	.0	15.9
Career		125	121	32.8	.433	.362	.843	4.8	2.0	1.1	.2	16.1

== Personal life ==
Lee earned a degree in general humanities and social science at Drexel and majored in special education, with a concentration in assistive technology at Louisville.

Lee is married to Sydel Curry, the daughter of Dell Curry and the younger sister of his former teammate Stephen Curry as well as Seth Curry. The couple's wedding was held on September 1, 2018. They have a son, Daxon Wardell-Xavier Lee, born on November 26, 2021. On March 21, 2023, Lee and Sydel announced they were expecting a baby girl. Their daughter, Daryn Alicia Lee, was born on August 23, 2023. In November 2024, the couple announced a third pregnancy. Their son, Dacen Lee, was born on May 20, 2025.
