= Tony Shaver =

American basketball player and coach

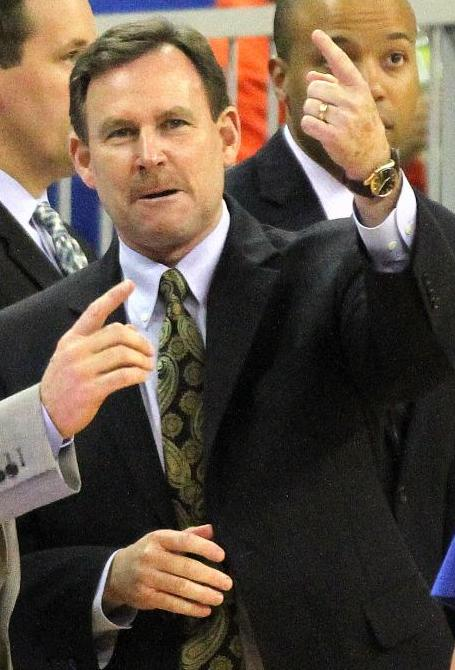
- Shaver in 2014

Biographical details
- Born: January 28, 1954 (age 72); High Point, North Carolina, U.S.

Playing career
- 1972–1976: North Carolina
- Position: Guard

Coaching career (HC unless noted)
- 1976–1986: Episcopal HS
- 1986–2003: Hampden–Sydney
- 2003–2019: William & Mary

Head coaching record
- Overall: 584–388

Accomplishments and honors

Championships
- 8 ODAC regular season (1989, 1992, 1995, 1997–1999, 2001, 2002); CAA regular season (2015)

Awards
- 2× CAA Coach of the Year (2008, 2010)

Tony Shaver (born January 28, 1954) is an American college basketball coach. From the 2003–04 through 2018–19 seasons, he was the head men's basketball coach at the College of William & Mary. He arrived at William & Mary after a 17-year tenure as the head coach at Hampden-Sydney College. He leaves as the winningest coach in William & Mary history and finished with an overall record of 226 wins and 268 losses.

Shaver played college basketball under Dean Smith at North Carolina from 1972 until 1976, making the team as a walk-on and playing with such Tar Heel greats as Mitch Kupchak, Tom LaGarde, Phil Ford and Walter Davis on a team that twice went to the NCAA tournament.

After graduating from UNC, Shaver accepted the head coach's job at Episcopal High School in Alexandria, Virginia. Shaver stayed at Episcopal for 10 years, ending his tenure as the Virginia State Private School Coach of the Year in 1986.

Following the 1986 season, Shaver made the jump to the collegiate ranks as the head coach at Hampden-Sydney. Under his guidance, the Tigers grew into a national powerhouse program at the Division III level. In 17 seasons with the Tigers, Shaver won almost 75% of the games he coached. His Tigers won eight Old Dominion Athletic Conference (ODAC) championships and went on to great success in the NCAA Division III tournament, making 11 appearances in the tournament, with 7 trips to the Sweet Sixteen and 2 trips to the Final Four. The Tigers finished as the Division III National Runner-up in 1999, after suffering a double-overtime 1-point loss to the University of Wisconsin–Platteville in the national championship game. Shaver was a three-time ODAC Coach of the Year: His tremendous success drew the attention of William & Mary, who hired him to coach the Tribe in 2003.

At William & Mary, Shaver turned the program around from a Colonial Athletic Association (CAA) cellar-dweller to a team with a .500 overall record (15–15, and 8–10 in CAA play) by 2006–07, his fourth year. The following year, William & Mary posted its first winning season since 1997–98 and, in the process, achieved its first back-to-back campaigns of 15-plus victories in 25 years. The 2007–08 team finished with a 10–8 conference record, entered the CAA tournament as the #5 seed, and proceeded to advance to its first-ever CAA Championship Game. Shaver was selected the Colonial Athletic Association's Coach of the Year in both 2007 and 2008. He broke the school record for wins by a men's basketball coach in February 2013, despite an overall losing record at W&M up to that point. In the 2014–15 season, W&M senior Marcus Thornton was named CAA Player of the Year while junior Terry Tarpey was named CAA Defensive Player of the Year, which Tarpey would repeat the next year as a senior. It marked the first time a Tribe player had earned either CAA honor.

== Head coaching record ==
Record table
| Season | Team | Overall | Conference | Standing | Postseason |
|---|---|---|---|---|---|
Hampden–Sydney Tigers (Old Dominion Athletic Conference) (1986–2003)
| 1986–87 | Hampden–Sydney | 12–13 | 6–8 | T–5th | |
| 1987–88 | Hampden–Sydney | 12–13 | 5–9 | T–6th | |
| 1988–89 | Hampden–Sydney | 21–8 | 7–5 | T–3rd | NCAA D-III Sweet 16 |
| 1989–90 | Hampden–Sydney | 15–11 | 9–7 | 4th | |
| 1990–91 | Hampden–Sydney | 21–6 | 12–4 | 3rd | |
| 1991–92 | Hampden–Sydney | 24–6 | 14–4 | 1st | NCAA D-III Sweet 16 |
| 1992–93 | Hampden–Sydney | 12–13 | 8–10 | 6th | |
| 1993–94 | Hampden–Sydney | 22–6 | 15–3 | 2nd | NCAA D-III Sweet 16 |
| 1994–95 | Hampden–Sydney | 28–3 | 17–1 | 1st | NCAA D-III Elite Eight |
| 1995–96 | Hampden–Sydney | 17–9 | 11–7 | T–4th | |
| 1996–97 | Hampden–Sydney | 21–7 | 12–6 | T–2nd | NCAA D-III First Round |
| 1997–98 | Hampden–Sydney | 23–6 | 13–5 | T–1st | NCAA D-III Sweet 16 |
| 1998–99 | Hampden–Sydney | 29–3 | 16–2 | 1st | NCAA D-III Runner-up |
| 1999–00 | Hampden–Sydney | 26–2 | 18–0 | 1st | NCAA D-III Second Round |
| 2000–01 | Hampden–Sydney | 24–5 | 14–4 | T–1st | NCAA D-III Second Round |
| 2001–02 | Hampden–Sydney | 23–6 | 13–5 | 3rd | NCAA D-III Second Round |
| 2002–03 | Hampden–Sydney | 28–4 | 17–1 | T–1st | NCAA D-III Final Four |
| Hampden–Sydney: | | 358–121 (.747) | 207–81 (.719) | | |
William & Mary Tribe (Colonial Athletic Association) (2003–2019)
| 2003–04 | William & Mary | 7–21 | 4–14 | T–8th | |
| 2004–05 | William & Mary | 8–21 | 3–15 | T–8th | |
| 2005–06 | William & Mary | 8–20 | 3–15 | T–10th | |
| 2006–07 | William & Mary | 15–15 | 8–10 | T–7th | |
| 2007–08 | William & Mary | 17–16 | 10–8 | 5th | |
| 2008–09 | William & Mary | 10–20 | 5–13 | 11th | |
| 2009–10 | William & Mary | 22–11 | 12–6 | 3rd | NIT First Round |
| 2010–11 | William & Mary | 10–22 | 4–14 | 11th | |
| 2011–12 | William & Mary | 6–26 | 4–14 | 10th | |
| 2012–13 | William & Mary | 13–17 | 7–11 | 8th | |
| 2013–14 | William & Mary | 20–12 | 10–6 | 3rd | |
| 2014–15 | William & Mary | 20–13 | 12–6 | T–1st | NIT First Round |
| 2015–16 | William & Mary | 20–11 | 11–7 | T–3rd | |
| 2016–17 | William & Mary | 17–14 | 10–8 | T–4th | |
| 2017–18 | William & Mary | 19–12 | 11–7 | 4th | |
| 2018–19 | William & Mary | 14–17 | 10–8 | 4th | |
| William & Mary: | | 226–268 (.457) | 124–162(.434) | | |
| Total: | | 584–389 (.600) | | | |
National champion Postseason invitational champion Conference regular season champion Conference regular season and conference tournament champion Division regular season champion Division regular season and conference tournament champion Conference tournament champion
