= 2011–12 William & Mary Tribe men's basketball team =

American college basketball season

2011–12 William & Mary Tribe men's basketball
- Conference: Colonial Athletic Association
- Record: 6–26 (4–14 CAA)
- Head coach: Tony Shaver (9th season)
- Home arena: Kaplan Arena

2011–12 CAA men's basketball standings
	Conf.				Overall
Team	W		L	PCT	W		L	PCT
Drexel	16	–	2	.889	29	–	7	.806
VCU†	15	–	3	.833	29	–	7	.806
George Mason	14	–	4	.778	24	–	9	.727
Old Dominion	13	–	5	.722	21	–	13	.618
Delaware	12	–	6	.667	18	–	14	.563
Georgia State	11	–	7	.611	22	–	11	.667
Northeastern	9	–	9	.500	14	–	17	.452
James Madison	5	–	13	.278	12	–	20	.375
UNCW	5	–	13	.278	10	–	21	.323
William & Mary	4	–	14	.222	6	–	26	.188
Hofstra	3	–	15	.167	10	–	22	.313
Towson	1	–	17	.056	1	–	31	.031
† 2012 CAA tournament winner Rankings from AP poll

The 2011–12 William & Mary Tribe men's basketball team represented The College of William & Mary during the 2011–12 college basketball season. This was head coach Tony Shaver's ninth season at William & Mary. The Tribe competed in the Colonial Athletic Association and played their home games at Kaplan Arena. They finished the season 6–26, 4–14 in CAA play. They lost in the preliminary round of the 2012 CAA men's basketball tournament to Northeastern. They did not participate in any post-season tournaments.
