= Bradford Burgess =

American professional basketball player

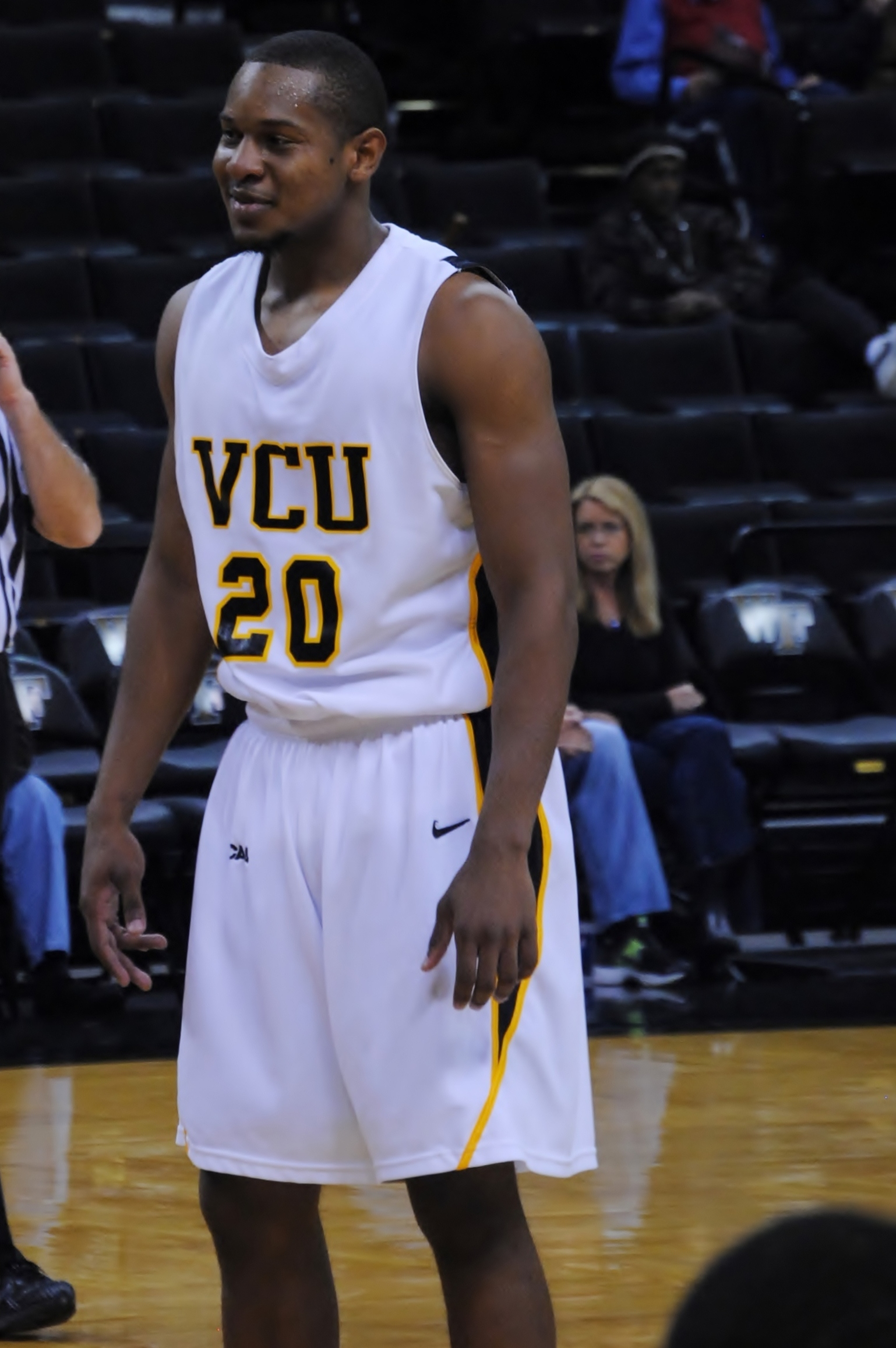
- Burgess with VCU in November 2010

Free agent
- Position: Small forward

Personal information
- Born: April 29, 1990 (age 36) Midlothian, Virginia
- Listed height: 6 ft 6 in (1.98 m)
- Listed weight: 224 lb (102 kg)

Career information
- High school: Benedictine (Richmond, Virginia)
- College: VCU (2008–2012)
- NBA draft: 2012: undrafted
- Playing career: 2012–present

Career history
- 2012–2014: Leuven Bears
- 2014–2015: Orlandina
- 2015–2016: Güssing Knights
- 2016: Falco Szombathely
- 2016–2017: Alba Fehérvár
- 2018: Donar
- 2018–2019: Liège

Career highlights
- DBL champion (2018); Hungarian Cup winner (2017); No. 20 jersey retired by VCU Rams

Bradford Burgess (born April 29, 1990) is an American professional basketball player who last played for Liège Basket of the Pro Basketball League. Born in Midlothian, Virginia, Burgess played four seasons for the VCU Rams team, from 2008 till 2012. His jersey number 20 was retired by the Rams.

== Professional career ==
Burgess started his professional career in Belgium with the Stella Artois Leuven Bears. He played two seasons in Leuven.

In 2014, Brugess signed with Orlandina Basket of the Italian Lega Basket Serie A (LBA) and parted ways with them on March 25, 2015.

On August 26, 2015, Burgess signed for the UBC Magnofit Güssing Knights of the Austrian ÖBL.

On July 1, 2016, Burgess signed with Alba Fehérvár. With Alba, Burgess won the 2017 Hungarian Cup tournament.

On January 27, 2018, Burgess signed with Donar of the Dutch Basketball League (DBL), who acquired him as a replacement for Stephen Domingo who suffered a season-ending injury. With Donar, he won the 2017–18 DBL championship, as well did he advance to the semifinals of the FIBA Europe Cup.

He signed with Liège Basket of the Belgian league on August 14, 2018.

The Oklahoma City Blue has named Bradford Burgess an assistant coach on Head Coach Grant Gibbs’ staff, the team announced in January 2021.

Burgess came to the Blue after spending the 2019–20 season as a performance analyst for the Oklahoma City Thunder.

In 2021, Burgess was hired by the Chicago Bulls as a Player Development Coordinator.

In May 2023, Burgess moved back to VCU as the Director of Student-Athlete Development.
