= Towson Center =

Arena in Towson, Maryland, US

Coordinates: 39.386375°N 76.616238°W

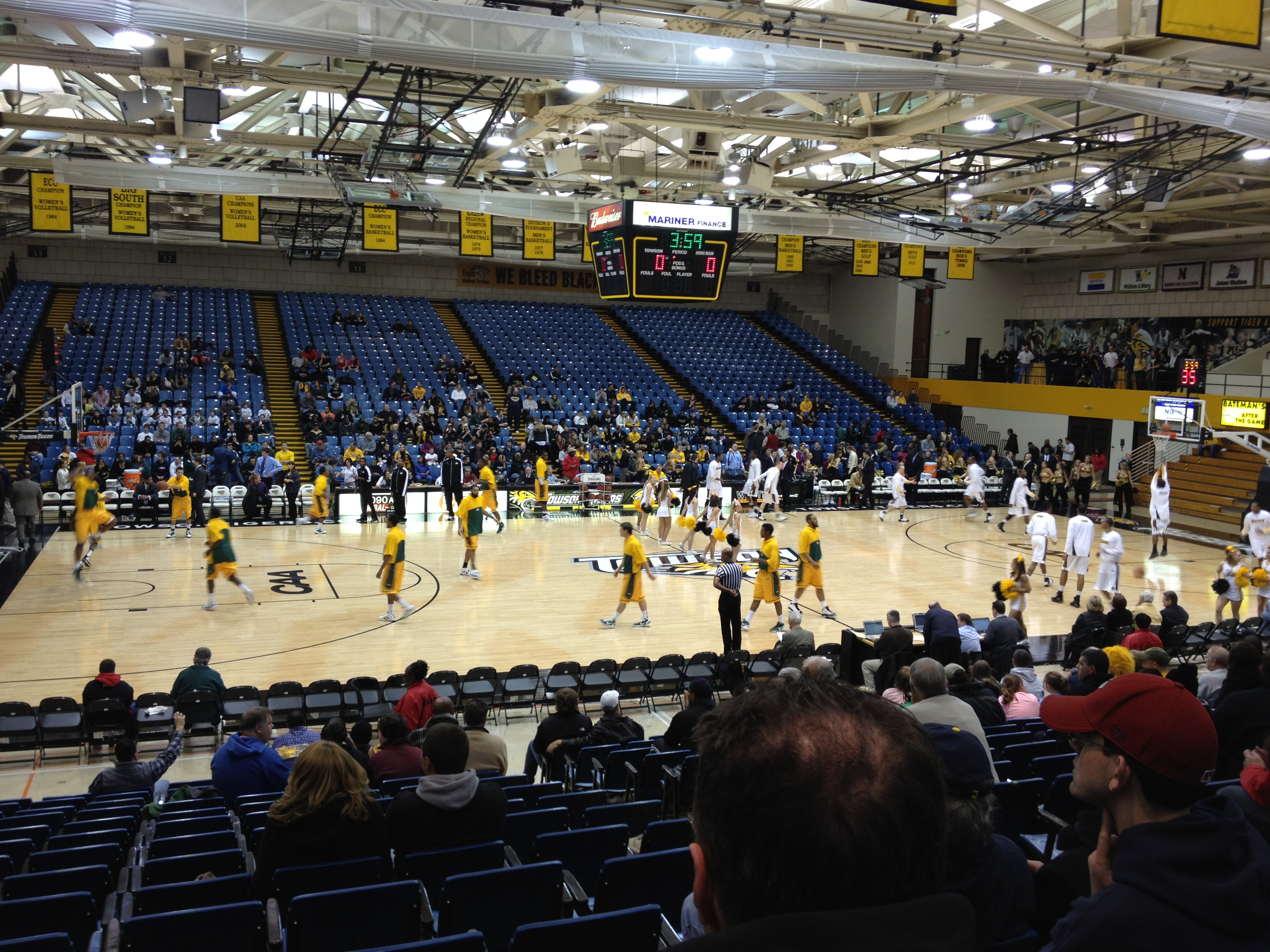
- The interior prior to the building's partitioning
- Interactive map of Towson Center
- Location: 7500 Osler Drive; Towson, MD 21252
- Owner: Towson University
- Operator: Towson University
- Capacity: 5,000

Construction
- Opened: 1976

Tenant
- Towson Tigers

Towson Center is an arena on the campus of Towson University, in Towson, Maryland. The arena opened in 1976. It was home to the Towson Tigers men's and women's basketball teams, the volleyball team, and the gymnastics team from 1976 to 2013.

In January 2011, it was formally announced that Towson Center would undergo a comprehensive renovation as part of the development of the new SECU Arena (now TU Arena, which opened in 2013. Under the new development, Towson Center's main arena was subdivided into a basketball practice facility, a gymnastics practice facility, offices for the Department of Athletics, a new Sports Performance facility featuring 10,000 square feet of space for both sports medicine and strength/conditioning plus a comprehensive academic/life skills center.

== Fields close to Towson Center ==
=== Softball ===
The Softball Complex is located behind the arena. It is home to the Tigers’ Softball team. Seating is located behind home plate and along the first and third base lines which can accommodate over 200 spectators. The playing surface of the field is grass.

=== Tennis ===
The Tennis Complex is located behind the Towson Center. This facility has ten (five lighted for evening play) USTA regulation tennis courts which are home to the Men's and Women's Tennis teams. The men's tennis team was cut in 2006, leaving only the women's tennis team available. However, it later became a candidate for reinstatement.

=== Soccer ===
The Soccer Complex is located adjacent to the center. The stands are located along the sideline and have a capacity of 500 and the field is re-seeded and re-sodded every year. It serves as the home field for the Men's and Women's Soccer teams. A press box was added in Fall 2002, which is equipped with air conditioning and heating.
