= Comcast Network =

American cable television network

The Comcast Network
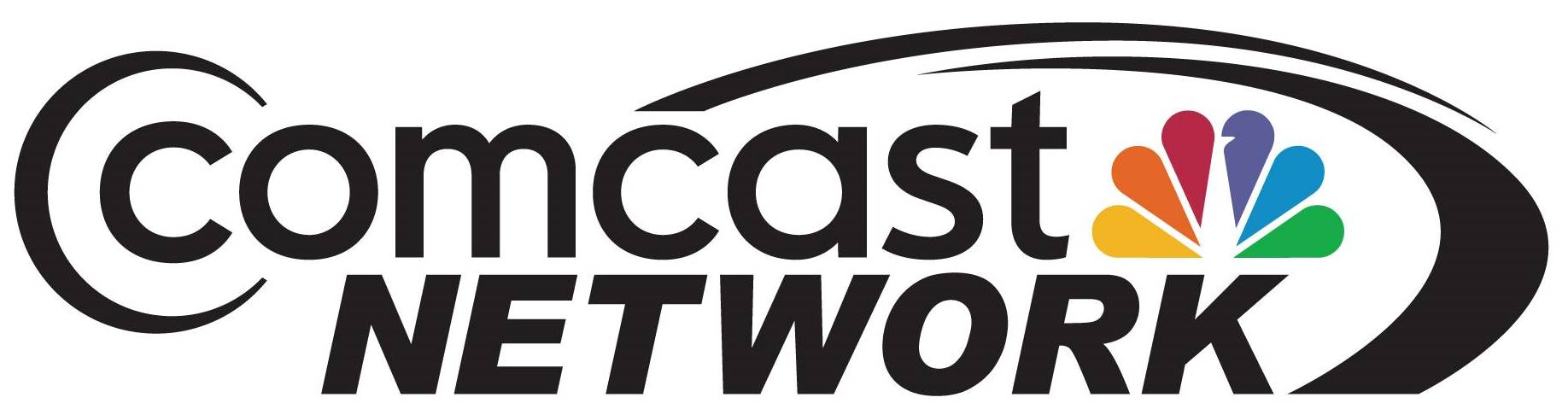
- Country: United States
- Broadcast area: Connecticut; Delaware; Maine; Maryland; Massachusetts; New Hampshire; New Jersey; Pennsylvania; Rhode Island; Vermont; Virginia; Washington, D.C.

History
- Launched: December 1, 1996; 29 years ago
- Closed: October 2, 2017; 8 years ago
- Replaced by: NBC Sports Philadelphia Plus; NBC Sports Washington Plus
- Former names: CN8, The Comcast Network (1996–2009); Comcast Network (2009–2017)

The Comcast Network (TCN) was an American cable television network which was carried mostly on Comcast and Xfinity cable systems in four states and 20 television markets in the Eastern U.S. from New Jersey to Virginia. The main focus of the network was on the Philadelphia area, although the channel attempted to structure its programs as national shows. Key markets included New Jersey, the Pennsylvania cities of Philadelphia, Pittsburgh and Harrisburg, Baltimore, Maryland, Washington, D.C., and Richmond, Virginia.

== History ==
The Comcast Network was first launched to around 400,000 homes on December 1, 1996, as CN8, The Comcast Network (though it was often abbreviated to simply "CN8.") This largely constituted Comcast's Philadelphia-area cable systems. CN8 carried a mix of public affairs and call-in shows upon launch, including a television simulcast of radio station NJ 101.5's morning show, as well as local sports. The channel was added to Comcast's Baltimore-area systems in early 1998.

In November 1999, Comcast purchased rival Lenfest Communications, which operated in the area under the Suburban Cable and Garden State Cable names. They had launched their own regional cable channel, TSM News (TSM standing for "Tri-State Media"), that April, with live newscasts airing from 9 am to 8 pm every day; Janet Zappala, formerly of WCAU-TV (which would become a sister station to CN8 in 2011 when Comcast acquired NBCUniversal), served as one of TSM's lead anchors. This resulted in TSM's shutdown, and many of its staffers were re-hired by Comcast to create CN8's news department, which launched in April 2000 from TSM's former studio facility in New Castle, DE. CN8 News originally had two hour-long nightly newscasts, at 7PM and 11PM, co-anchored by another ex-WCAU personality, Arthur Fennell; eventually, the 11PM edition moved to 10PM. In addition to this facility, CN8 operated studios in Philadelphia's Center City neighborhood, and news bureaus/studios in Baltimore, Maryland, Trenton and Union, New Jersey. CN8 was now distributed across Comcast's systems from Maryland to northern New Jersey, providing regionalized coverage and shows for these areas.

In 2002, CN8 launched in Pittsburgh when Comcast acquired AT&T Broadband, which would be further expanded when Comcast acquired assets from Adelphia Communications following their liquidation. (The two deals left the satellite TV companies and Armstrong Cable as the only other pay-TV options in Western Pennsylvania until the launch of Verizon Fios.) However, CN8 never launched a standalone Pittsburgh feed; Comcast acquired a stake in PCNC from the AT&T Broadband deal (a remnant of their predecessor TCI prior to AT&T acquiring TCI) and to this day continues to serve as a silent partner to that channel's other owner, local NBC affiliate WPXI.

In May 2003, CN8 further expanded into New England. Replacing AT&T 3, operated by Comcast's regional predecessor AT&T Broadband, this version of CN8 largely carried the same programming as the Philadelphia-area feed, only with their newscasts replaced by new regional shows; the 7PM news was replaced by NiteBeat, covering politics and analysis of regional news, hosted by Barry Nolan (formerly of WBZ-TV's Evening Magazine), while the 10pm news was replaced in New England with Sports Pulse, a one-hour nightly program of regional sports talk, highlights, and analysis. This was done to avoid redundancy with New England Cable News, already partly owned by Comcast at the time. CN8 also produced a wide range of live sports in New England, including Division I college football, hockey and basketball, minor-league baseball, professional boxing, figure skating, high school sports, World Team Tennis, and a popular weekly candlepin bowling series. The New England feed was available to 2.2 million viewers across the region.

That same year, Philadelphia news veteran Larry Kane joined CN8 as a consultant, and had his own show, Larry Kane: Voice of Reason. However, due to low viewership, CN8 ended their newscasts in 2006. By 2008, CN8 was staffed by approximately 450 employees and was reaching more than 9 million viewers in 12 states and 20 television markets along the East Coast. The CN8 brand was discontinued on January 6, 2009, as part of a larger restructuring of the network in order to respond to low ratings as well as closing down in the New England market, where its primary markets were Boston and Hartford/New Haven. Some CN8 New England programming migrated to New England Cable News, with some sports properties picked up by Comcast SportsNet New England.

On August 23, 2017, NBC Sports Regional Networks announced that the TCN branding would be dropped on October 2, 2017; TCN Philadelphia was rebranded as NBC Sports Philadelphia +, and TCN Mid-Atlantic was to be rebranded as NBC Sports Washington +. The rebranding was concurrent with the renaming of the Comcast SportsNet networks under the NBC Sports brand. It is not clear what network, if any, replaced the channel in the Pittsburgh market.

== Programs ==
=== As CN8 ===
Show title
American Builder
Backstage with Barry Nolan
Christina Cooks!
CN8 Candlepin Challenge
CN8 News
CN8 Presents: Comcast in Concert
CN8 Sports
Gymnastics 360 with Shannon Miller
It's Your Call with Lynn Doyle
Larry Kane: Voice of Reason
Let's Cook with Paul Dillon
Lou Tilley's Sports Connection
Money Matters Today
Nancy Kerrigan's World of Skating
Nitebeat
One on One with Steve Adubato
Out of Bounds
Real Life with Mary Amoroso
Seeking Solutions with Suzanne
Sports Pulse
Your Morning
Art Fennell Reports
Roll Call

== See also ==
- Broadcasting of sports events
- NBC Sports
