= Youngstown State Penguins men's basketball statistical leaders =

The Youngstown State Penguins men's basketball statistical leaders are individual statistical leaders of the Youngstown State Penguins men's basketball program in various categories, including points, assists, blocks, rebounds, and steals. Within those areas, the lists identify single-game, single-season, and career leaders. The Penguins represent the Youngstown State University in the NCAA's Horizon League.

Youngstown State began competing in intercollegiate basketball in 1927. However, the school's record book does not generally list records from before the 1950s, as records from before this period are often incomplete and inconsistent. Since scoring was much lower in this era, and teams played much fewer games during a typical season, it is likely that few or no players from this era would appear on these lists anyway.

The NCAA did not officially record assists as a stat until the 1983–84 season, and blocks and steals until the 1985–86 season, but Youngstown State's record books includes players in these stats before these seasons. These lists are updated through the end of the 2020–21 season.

== Scoring ==
Career
Rk	Player	Points	Seasons
1	Jeff Covington	2,424	1974–75 1975–76 1976–77 1977–78
2	Tony Knott	2,218	1952–53 1953–54 1954–55 1955–56
3	Kendrick Perry	1,991	2010–11 2011–12 2012–13 2013–14
4	John McElroy	1,942	1965–66 1966–67 1967–68 1968–69
5	Mickey Yugovich	1,917	1956–57 1957–58 1958–59 1959–60
6	Cameron Morse	1,913	2014–15 2015–16 2016–17 2017–18
7	Reggie Kemp	1,820	1988–89 1989–90 1990–91 1992–93
8	Herb Lake	1,783	1955–56 1956–57 1957–58 1958–59
9	Billy Johnson	1,726	1968–69 1969–70 1970–71 1971–72
10	Quin Humphrey	1,707	2003–04 2004–05 2005–06 2006–07

Season
Rk	Player	Points	Season
1	John McElroy	729	1968–69
2	Cameron Morse	711	2016–17
3	Tony Knott	705	1955–56
4	Kendrick Perry	682	2013–14
5	Dave Zeigler	665	1979–80
6	Tilman Bevely	662	1986–87
7	Jeff Covington	660	1977–78
8	Jeff Covington	633	1976–77
9	Dave Zeigler	623	1978–79
10	Dwayne Cohill	611	2022–23

Single game
Rk	Player	Points	Season	Opponent
1	John McElroy	72	1968–69	Wayne State
2	Tilman Bevely	55	1985–86	Tennessee Tech
3	John McElroy	52	1968–69	Illinois Wesleyan
4	Tony Knott	50	1953–54	Fenn
5	Reggie Kemp	46	1992–93	Wright State
	Jeff Covington	46	1977–78	Mankato State
	John McElroy	46	1968–69	Hiram
8	John McElroy	45	1966–67	St. Vincent
9	Cameron Morse	44	2016–17	UIC
	Cameron Morse	44	2015–16	Green Bay
	Jeff Covington	44	1974–75	Alliance
	Leo Mogus	44	1941–42	Mexico City YMCA

== Rebounds ==
Career
Rk	Player	Rebounds	Seasons
1	Herb Lake	1,848	1955–56 1956–57 1957–58 1958–59
2	Jeff Covington	1,381	1974–75 1975–76 1976–77 1977–78
3	Mickey Yugovich	1,280	1956–57 1957–58 1958–59 1959–60
4	Naz Bohannon	990	2017–18 2018–19 2019–20 2020–21
5	Ron Allen	986	1961–62 1962–63 1963–64
6	Tim Jackson	899	1987–88 1988–89 1989–90 1990–91
7	Michael Akuchie	840	2017–18 2018–19 2019–20 2020–21 2021–22
8	Frank Fitz	743	1965–66 1966–67 1967–68
9	Dave Culliver	729	1962–63 1963–64 1964–65 1965–66
10	Ron Smith	713	1968–69 1969–70 1970–71 1971–72

Season
Rk	Player	Rebounds	Season
1	Herb Lake	555	1956–57
2	Herb Lake	489	1958–59
3	Herb Lake	448	1957–58
4	Ron Allen	380	1962-63
5	Jeff Covington	366	1976–77
6	Jeff Covington	362	1977–78
7	Herb Lake	356	1955–56
8	DJ Burns	353	2023–24
9	Ron Allen	350	1961–62
10	Charles Day	349	1960–61

Single game
Rk	Player	Rebounds	Season	Opponent
1	Herb Lake	33	1957–58	Westminster
2	Jeff Covington	32	1976–77	Bellarmine
	Charles Day	32	1960–61	Gannon
	Herb Lake	32	1958–59	Alliance
5	Herb Lake	31	1958–59	St. Vincent
6	Herb Lake	30	1956–57	Geneva
7	Herb Lake	28	1958–59	Anderson
8	Herb Lake	27	1958–59	Geneva
9	Will Teague	26	1968–69	Toronto
	Will Teague	26	1968–69	Alliance
	Frank Fitz	26	1967–68	Alliance
	Mickey Yugovich	26	1959–60	Alma
	Robert Mayberry	26	1953–54	

== Assists ==
Career
Rk	Player	Assists	Seasons
1	Terry Moore	795	1973–74 1974–75 1975–76 1976–77
2	Bruce Timko	551	1982–83 1983–84 1984–85 1985–86
3	Kendrick Perry	505	2010–11 2011–12 2012–13 2013–14
4	Ryan Patton	456	1998–99 1999–00 2000–01 2001–02
5	DJ Cole	418	2011–12 2012–13 2013–14 2014–15
6	Billy Johnson	392	1968–69 1969–70 1970–71 1971–72
7	Cameron Morse	334	2014–15 2015–16 2016–17 2017–18
8	Marc Vassar	327	1988–89 1989–90 1990–91 1992–93
9	Anthony Hunt	325	1995–96 1996–97 1997–98
10	Francisco Santiago	306	2015–16 2016–17 2017–18

Season
Rk	Player	Assists	Season
1	Billy Johnson	239	1971–72
2	Terry Moore	230	1974–75
3	Terry Moore	200	1973–74
4	Terry Moore	189	1975–76
5	Terry Moore	176	1976–77
6	Bruce Timko	169	1985–86
7	Dwayne Cohill	164	2022–23
8	Ryan Patton	163	2000–01
9	Francisco Santiago	158	2016–17
10	Bruce Timko	156	1983–84

Single game
Rk	Player	Assists	Season	Opponent
1	Bill Eckert	26	1968–69	Wayne State
2	Terry Moore	20	1973–74	Georgia State
3	Bill Eckert	17	1968–69	Wayne State
4	Joe Votino	16	1978–79	Buffalo
5	Terry Moore	15	1975–76	SIU-Edwardsville
	Bryce McBride	15	2022–23	Westminster (PA)

== Steals ==
Career
Rk	Player	Steals	Seasons
1	Kendrick Perry	246	2010–11 2011–12 2012–13 2013–14
2	Bruce Alexander	182	1978–79 1979–80 1980–81 1981–82 1982–83
3	Reggie Kemp	175	1988–89 1989–90 1990–91 1992–93
4	Quin Humphrey	137	2003–04 2004–05 2005–06 2006–07
5	DJ Cole	133	2011–12 2012–13 2013–14 2014–15
	Kevin Cherry	133	1981–82 1982–83 1983–84 1984–85
7	Bruce Timko	131	1982–83 1983–84 1984–85 1985–86
8	Garrett Covington	127	2017–18 2018–19 2019–20 2020–21 2021–22 2022–23
9	Cameron Morse	126	2014–15 2015–16 2016–17 2017–18
10	Marlon Williamson	122	1999–00 2000–01 2001–02 2002–03

Season
Rk	Player	Steals	Season
1	Kendrick Perry	76	2013–14
2	Kendrick Perry	74	2011–12
3	Marlon Williamson	64	2002–03
4	Kendrick Perry	56	2012–13
5	Reggie Kemp	55	1989–90
6	Braun Hartfield	54	2017–18
7	Bruce Alexander	53	1980–81
8	Bruce Alexander	52	1979–80
9	DJ Cole	51	2014–15
10	Reggie Kemp	50	1990–91
	Adrian Nelson	50	2022–23

Single game
Rk	Player	Steals	Season	Opponent
1	Garrett Covington	7	2017–18	Franciscan
	Kendrick Perry	7	2011–12	Loyola
3	Adrian Nelson	6	2022–23	Wright State
	Marlon Williamson	6	2002–03	UMKC
	Albert Crockett	6	1998–99	Slippery Rock
	Anthony Hunt	6	1995–96	Eastern Illinois
	Derrick Simmons	6	1993–94	Valparaiso
	Kevin Cherry	6	1983–84	Tennessee Tech
	Rob Carter	6	1981–82	Westminster
	John Goodson	6	1981–82	Morehead State

== Blocks ==
Career
Rk	Player	Blocks	Seasons
1	Damian Eargle	309	2010–11 2011–12 2012–13
2	Ricky Tunstall	221	1982–83 1983–84
3	Gabe Dynes	165	2023-24 2024-25
4	David Brown	134	1997–98 1998–99 1999–00 2000–01
5	Jack Liles	118	2005–06 2006–07 2007–08 2008–09
6	Imanuel Zorgvol	82	2023–24 2025–26
7	TeJay Anderson	81	2000–01 2001–02 2002–03 2003–04
	Michael Akuchie	81	2017–18 2018–19 2019–20 2020–21 2021–22
9	Devin Haygood	80	2015–16 2016–17 2017–18
10	John Barber	71	2003–04 2004–05 2005–06 2006–07 2007–08

Season
Rk	Player	Blocks	Season
1	Ricky Tunstall	138	1982–83
2	Damian Eargle	116	2011–12
3	Gabe Dynes	104	2024-25
4	Damian Eargle	102	2012–13
5	Damian Eargle	91	2010–11
6	Ricky Tunstall	83	1983–84
7	Gabe Dynes	61	2023-24
8	Imanuel Zorgvol	60	2025–26
9	David Brown	44	1999–00
10	David Brown	39	1997–98

Single game
Rk	Player	Blocks	Season	Opponent
1	Ricky Tunstall	12	1982–83	Delaware State
2	Ricky Tunstall	11	1982–83	MTSU
3	Gabe Dynes	9	2024-25	Toledo
4	Damian Eargle	8	2011–12	UC-Riverside
	Ricky Tunstall	8	1982–83	UM-Eastern Shore
