= 2011–12 UIC Flames men's basketball team =

American college basketball season

2011–12 UIC Flames men's basketball
- Conference: Horizon League
- Record: 8–22 (3–15 Horizon)
- Head coach: Howard Moore
- Assistant coaches: Al Biancalana; Donnie Kirksey; Stew Robinson
- Home arena: UIC Pavilion

2011–12 Horizon League men's basketball standings
	Conf.				Overall
Team	W		L	PCT	W		L	PCT
Valparaiso	14	–	4	.778	22	–	11	.667
Cleveland State	12	–	6	.667	22	–	11	.667
Detroit †	11	–	7	.611	22	–	14	.611
Milwaukee	11	–	7	.611	20	–	13	.606
Butler	11	–	7	.611	22	–	14	.611
Youngstown State	10	–	8	.556	16	–	15	.516
Green Bay	10	–	8	.556	15	–	15	.500
Wright State	7	–	11	.389	13	–	19	.406
UIC	3	–	15	.167	8	–	22	.267
Loyola Chicago	1	–	17	.056	7	–	23	.233
† 2012 Horizon League Tournament winner As of March 6, 2012; Rankings from AP Poll

The 2011–12 UIC Flames men's basketball team represented the University of Illinois at Chicago in the 2011–12 NCAA Division I men's basketball season. Their head coach was Howard Moore, serving his second year. The Flames played their home games at the UIC Pavilion and were members of the Horizon League.

== Roster ==
2011–12 UIC Flames men's basketball team
Players
Coaches

Pos.	#	Name	Height	Weight	Year	Hometown
G	0	Sammy Sutter	6 ft 2 in (1.88 m)	164 lb (74 kg)	Fr	Bartlett, IL
G	1	Daniel Barnes	6 ft 2 in (1.88 m)	169 lb (77 kg)	Sr	Oak Park, IL
G/F	3	Rob Robinson	6 ft 5 in (1.96 m)	188 lb (85 kg)	Fr	Chicago, IL
G	4	Gary Talton	6 ft 1 in (1.85 m)	158 lb (72 kg)	Jr	Dallas, TX
G	5	Greg Travis	6 ft 0 in (1.83 m)	186 lb (84 kg)	Fr	Chicago, IL
G	10	Marc Brown	6 ft 4 in (1.93 m)	203 lb (92 kg)	Fr	Dallas, TX
G	11	Matt Bush	6 ft 4 in (1.93 m)	197 lb (89 kg)	RS Sr	Quincy, IL
F	13	Hayden Humes	6 ft 8 in (2.03 m)	215 lb (98 kg)	So	Valparaiso, IN
G	20	Anthony Kelley	6 ft 6 in (1.98 m)	188 lb (85 kg)	Jr	Aurora, IL
G	21	Jerome Brown	6 ft 4 in (1.93 m)	186 lb (84 kg)	Fr	Chicago, IL
C	32	Darrin Williams	6 ft 9 in (2.06 m)	269 lb (122 kg)	Sr	Louisville, KY
F	33	Ahmen Fells	6 ft 5 in (1.96 m)	183 lb (83 kg)	Fr	Chicago, IL
F	34	Paris Carter	6 ft 7 in (2.01 m)	221 lb (100 kg)	Sr	Lansing, IL
C	44	Will Simonton	6 ft 10 in (2.08 m)	217 lb (98 kg)	Fr	Fairfax, VA
C	45	Dorian Tyler	6 ft 9 in (2.06 m)	196 lb (89 kg)	Sr	Chicago, IL

Head coach

- Howard Moore (Wisconsin)

Assistant coach(es)

- Al Biancalana (Elmhurst)
- Donnie Kirksey (Roosevelt)
- Stew Robinson (Indiana)

Legend

- (C) Team captain
- (S) Suspended
- (I) Ineligible
- (W) Walk-on
- Injured
- Current redshirt

Roster
Last update: 2011-10-27

== Schedule ==
Date time, TV	Rank^{#}	Opponent^{#}	Result	Record	Site city, state
Exhibition
November 2, 2011*; 7:00 pm		Chicago	W 61–45	—	UIC Pavilion; Chicago, IL
November 8, 2011*; 7:30 pm		Lake Forest	W 57–33	—	UIC Pavilion; Chicago, IL
Regular season
November 11, 2011*; 6:00 pm		at Eastern Michigan	L 57–68	0–1	Convocation Center; Ypsilanti, MI
November 16, 2011*; 7:00 pm		Roosevelt	W 59–42	1–1	UIC Pavilion; Chicago, IL
November 19, 2011*; 3:00 pm		Quincy	L 61–65	1–2	UIC Pavilion; Chicago, IL
November 23, 2011*; 7:00 pm		Evansville	W 79–75	2–2	UIC Pavilion; Chicago, IL
November 26, 2011*; 6:00 pm		at Toledo	L 67–82	2–3	Savage Arena; Toledo, OH
December 1, 2011; 7:00 pm		at Green Bay	L 68–71	2–4 (0–1)	Resch Center; Green Bay, WI
December 3, 2011; 1:00 pm		at Milwaukee	L 71–73 ^{OT}	2–5 (0–2)	U.S. Cellular Arena; Milwaukee, WI
December 10, 2011*; 3:00 pm		Northern Illinois	W 62–55	3–5	UIC Pavilion; Chicago, IL
December 13, 2011*; 9:00 pm, RTNW		at Oregon State	W 95–53	3–6	Gill Coliseum; Corvallis, OR
December 16, 2011*; 6:00 pm		at Central Michigan	L 67–70	3–7	McGuirk Arena; Mount Pleasant, MI
December 19, 2011*; 7:30 pm		Western Illinois	W 57–56	4–7	UIC Pavilion; Chicago, IL
December 23, 2011*; 6:00 pm		at Dayton	W 64–57	4–8	University of Dayton Arena; Dayton, OH
December 29, 2011; 7:00 pm		Detroit	W 63–59	5–8 (1–2)	UIC Pavilion; Chicago, IL
December 31, 2011; 1:00 pm		Wright State	L 70–74 ^{OT}	5–9 (1–3)	UIC Pavilion; Chicago, IL
January 5, 2012; 6:00 pm		at Cleveland State	L 56–73	5–10 (1–4)	Wolstein Center; Cleveland, OH
January 7, 2012; 6:05 pm		at Youngstown State	L 50–71	5–11 (1–5)	Beeghly Center; Youngstown, OH
January 14, 2012; 3:00 pm		Loyola Chicago	W 58–51	6–11 (2–5)	UIC Pavilion; Chicago, IL
January 19, 2012; 7:30 pm		Butler	L 49–57	6–12 (2–6)	UIC Pavilion; Chicago, IL
January 21, 2012; 3:00 pm		Valparaiso	L 55–60	6–13 (2–7)	UIC Pavilion; Chicago, IL
January 25, 2012; 6:00 pm		at Wright State	L 63–69	6–14 (2–8)	Nutter Center; Dayton, OH
January 27, 2012; 6:00 pm		at Detroit	L 66–70	6–15 (2–9)	Calihan Hall; Detroit, MI
February 2, 2012; 7:00 pm		Youngstown State	W 72–68	7–15 (3–9)	UIC Pavilion; Chicago, IL
February 5, 2012; 1:00 pm		Cleveland State	L 42–70	7–16 (3–10)	UIC Pavilion; Chicago, IL
February 11, 2012; 1:00 pm		at Loyola Chicago	L 69–78	7–17 (3–11)	Joseph J. Gentile Center; Chicago, IL
February 14, 2012; 7:05 pm		at Valparaiso	L 65–74	7–18 (3–12)	Athletics–Recreation Center; Valparaiso, IN
February 18, 2012; 7:00 pm		at Eastern Illinois; ESPN BracketBusters	W 67–63	8–18	Lantz Arena; Charleston, IL
February 21, 2012; 6:00 pm		at Butler	L 44–69	8–19 (3–13)	Hinkle Fieldhouse; Indianapolis, IN
February 23, 2012; 7:00 pm		Milwaukee	L 61–72	8–20 (3–14)	UIC Pavilion; Chicago, IL
February 25, 2012; 1:00 pm		Green Bay	L 63–71	8–21 (3–15)	UIC Pavilion; Chicago, IL
Horizon League tournament
February 28, 2012; 7:00 pm, HLN	(9)	at (4) Milwaukee; First Round	L 55–68	8–22	Klotsche Center; Milwaukee, WI
*Non-conference game. ^{#}Rankings from Coaches' Poll. (#) Tournament seedings in parentheses. All times are in Central Time..
