= 2011–12 Milwaukee Panthers men's basketball team =

American college basketball season

2011–12 Milwaukee Panthers men's basketball

CBI, First Round
- Conference: Horizon League
- Record: 20–14 (11–7 Horizon League)
- Head coach: Rob Jeter (7th season)
- Assistant coaches: Duffy Conroy (8th season); Chad Boudreau (7th season); Ronnie Jones (1st season)
- Home arena: U.S. Cellular Arena; Klotsche Center

2011–12 Horizon League men's basketball standings
	Conf.				Overall
Team	W		L	PCT	W		L	PCT
Valparaiso	14	–	4	.778	22	–	11	.667
Cleveland State	12	–	6	.667	22	–	11	.667
Detroit †	11	–	7	.611	22	–	14	.611
Milwaukee	11	–	7	.611	20	–	13	.606
Butler	11	–	7	.611	22	–	14	.611
Youngstown State	10	–	8	.556	16	–	15	.516
Green Bay	10	–	8	.556	15	–	15	.500
Wright State	7	–	11	.389	13	–	19	.406
UIC	3	–	15	.167	8	–	22	.267
Loyola Chicago	1	–	17	.056	7	–	23	.233
† 2012 Horizon League Tournament winner As of March 6, 2012; Rankings from AP Poll

The 2011–12 Milwaukee Panthers men's basketball team represented the University of Wisconsin–Milwaukee during the 2011–12 NCAA Division I men's basketball season. The Panthers, led by seventh year head coach Rob Jeter, played their home games at U.S. Cellular Arena, with two home games played at the Klotsche Center, and are members of the Horizon League. They finished the season 20–14, 11–7 in Horizon League play to finish in a three-way tie for third place. They lost in the quarterfinals of the Horizon League Basketball tournament to Butler. They were invited to the 2012 College Basketball Invitational where they lost in the first round to TCU.

== 2011 recruiting class ==
College recruiting information
Name	Hometown	School	Height	Weight	Commit date
J.J. Panoske; Power Forward	Brodhead, WI	Brodhead High School	6 ft 9 in (2.06 m)	195 lb (88 kg)	Aug 9, 2010
J.J. Panoske; Power Forward	Recruit ratings: Scout: Rivals: (83)				
Shaquille Boga; Point Guard	Florissant, MO	McCluer High School	5 ft 10 in (1.78 m)	170 lb (77 kg)	Nov 1, 2010
Shaquille Boga; Point Guard	Recruit ratings: Scout: Rivals: (88)				
Paris Gulley; Shooting Guard	West Burlington, IA	Southeastern Community College	6 ft 2 in (1.88 m)	170 lb (77 kg)	Apr 27, 2011
Paris Gulley; Shooting Guard	Recruit ratings: Scout: Rivals: (N/A)				
Demetrius Harris; Power Forward	Park Hills, MO	Mineral Area Community College	6 ft 7 in (2.01 m)	230 lb (100 kg)	Apr 11, 2011
Demetrius Harris; Power Forward	Recruit ratings: Scout: Rivals: (N/A)				
Mitch Roelke; Guard	Waunakee, WI	Waunakee High School	6 ft 0 in (1.83 m)	170 lb (77 kg)	Apr 11, 2011
Mitch Roelke; Guard	Recruit ratings: Scout: Rivals: (N/A)				
Overall recruit ranking:
Note: In many cases, Scout, Rivals, 247Sports, On3, and ESPN may conflict in their listings of height and weight.; In these cases, the average was taken. ESPN grades are on a 100-point scale.; Sources: "2011 Team Ranking". Rivals.

== Coaching staff ==
Name	Type	College
Rob Jeter	Head coach	University of Wisconsin–Platteville
Chad Boudreau	Assistant coach	Hannibal-LaGrange College
Duffy Conroy	Assistant coach	St. Ambrose University
Ronnie Jones	Assistant coach	University of Wisconsin–Milwaukee
Chip MacKenzie	Director of Basketball Operations	Edgewood College
Tone Boyle	Video Coordinator	University of Wisconsin–Milwaukee
Chris Hill	Academic Advisor	University of Wisconsin–Milwaukee
Elliott Meyer	Athletic trainer	University of Wisconsin–Milwaukee

== Roster ==
#	Name	Height	Weight (lbs.)	Position	Class	Hometown	Previous Team(s)
1	Ja'Rob McCallum	6'0"	170	G	Jr.	Marion, IN, U.S.	Marion HS
2	Kaylon Williams	6'3"	185	G	Sr.	Cedar Rapids, IA, U.S.	Kennedy HS
3	Kyle Kelm	6'9"	210	F	So.	Randolph, WI, U.S.	Randolph HS
4	Ryan Allen	6'3"	200	G	Sr.	South Holland, IL, U.S.	Thornton HS
5	Shaquille Boga	5'11"	170	G	Fr.	St. Louis, MO, U.S.	McCluer HS
14	Paris Gulley	6'2"	170	G	Jr.	Peoria, Il, U.S.	Peoria Manual HS
15	Demetrius Harris	6'7"	230	F	Jr.	Jacksonville, AR, U.S.	Jacksonville HS
20	Mitch Roelke	6'0"	170	G	So.		
21	Tony Meier	6'8"	210	F	Sr.	Wildwood, MO, U.S.	Lafayette HS
22	Evan Richard	6'2"	175	G	Fr.	Kieler, WI, U.S.	Cuba City HS
23	J.J. Panoske	6'10"	225	F	Fr.	Brodhead, WI, U.S.	Brodhead HS
32	Lonnie Boga	6'3"	200	G	Jr.	St. Louis, MO, U.S.	McCluer HS
33	Quinton Gustavson	6'9"	200	F	Fr.	Racine, WI, U.S.	Case HS
41	Nick Olson	6'6"	215	F	So.	Milwaukee, WI, U.S.	Wauwatosa West HS
42	James Haarsma	6'7"	230	F	Jr.	Racine, WI, U.S.	St. Catherine's HS
44	Ryan Haggerty	6'8"	210	F	Jr.	Glen Ellyn, IL, U.S.	Benet Academy
45	Christian Wolf	6'8"	250	F	Jr.	Kohler, WI, U.S.	Kohler HS

== 2011–12 Schedule and results ==
- All times are Central
- All conference games are aired on horizon league.com

Date time, TV	Rank^{#}	Opponent^{#}	Result	Record	Site city, state
Exhibition
11/5/2011*; 7:00pm		Parkside	W 67–59	–	Klotsche Center; Milwaukee, WI
Regular season
11/12/2011*; 1:00pm		Southwest Minnesota State University	W 71–65	1–0	U.S. Cellular Arena (2,246); Milwaukee, WI
11/14/2011*; 7:00pm		at Northern Illinois	W 59–57	2–0	Convocation Center (1,025); DeKalb, IL
11/18/2011*; 7:00pm, Sports 32		IUPUI; Auto Owners Insurance Spartan Invitational	W 62–49	3–0	U.S. Cellular Arena (3,022); Milwaukee, WI
11/20/2011*; 4:00pm, Horizon League.com		Texas Southern; Auto Owners Insurance Spartan Invitational	W 73–38	4–0	U.S. Cellular Arena (2,531); Milwaukee, WI
11/23/2011*; 6:00pm, Big Ten Network.com		at Michigan State; Auto Owners Insurance Spartan Invitational	L 55–68	4–1	Breslin Student Events Center (14,797); East Lansing, MI
11/26/2011*; 7:00pm		at Little Rock; Auto Owners Insurance Spartan Invitational	W 59–54	5–1	Jack Stephens Center (2,431); Little Rock, AR
12/1/2011; 7:00 pm, Horizon League.com		Loyola	W 59–41	6–1 (1–0)	U.S. Cellular Arena (3,517); Milwaukee, WI
12/3/2011; 1:00 pm, Sports 32		UIC	W 73–71 ^{OT}	7–1 (2–0)	U.S. Cellular Arena (3,330); Milwaukee, WI
12/5/2011*; 7:00 pm, Sports 32		at DePaul	W 87–76	8–1	Allstate Arena (6,661); Rosemont, IL
12/10/2011*; 1:00 pm		at Northern Iowa	L 51–67	8–2	McLeod Center (4,067); Cedar Falls, IA
12/13/2011*; 7:00 pm, Sports 32		#14 Wisconsin	L 54–60	8–3	U.S. Cellular Arena (10,143); Milwaukee, WI
12/17/2011*; 7:00 pm, Horizon League.com		Omaha	W 86–50	9–3	Klotsche Center (2,446); Milwaukee, WI
12/22/2011*; 8:00 pm, Sports 32\ESPN3		at #10 Marquette	L 50–64	9–4	Bradley Center (14,917); Milwaukee, WI
12/29/2011; 7:00 pm, Horizon League.com		at Valparaiso	W 57–55	10–4 (3–0)	Athletics–Recreation Center (2,644); Valparaiso, IN
12/31/2011; 1:00 pm, Sports 32/WNDY/HLN GOTW		at Butler	L 50–54	10–5 (3–1)	Hinkle Fieldhouse (7,291); Indianapolis, IN
1/3/2012*; 6:00 pm		at Western Michigan	L 61–72	10–6	University Arena (2,246); Kalamazoo, MI
1/7/2012; 7:00 pm, Sports 32		Green Bay	W 64–63	11–6 (4–1)	U.S. Cellular Arena (4,437); Milwaukee, WI
1/12/2012; 7:00 pm, Sports 32		Wright State	W 58–38	12–6 (5–1)	U.S. Cellular Arena (2,364); Milwaukee, WI
1/14/2012; 7:00 pm, Sports 32		Detroit	W 84–74	13–6 (6–1)	U.S. Cellular Arena (4,038); Milwaukee, WI
1/20/2012; 7:05 pm, ESPN3		at Youngstown State	W 68–66	13–7 (6–2)	Beeghly Center (2,845); Youngstown, OH
1/22/2012; 1:00 pm, Sports 32		at Cleveland State	L 57–83	13–8 (6–3)	Wolstein Center (3,235); Cleveland, OH
1/26/2012; 7:00 pm, ESPN3		Butler	W 53–42	14–8 (7–3)	U.S. Cellular Arena (6,435); Milwaukee, WI
1/28/2012; 1:00 pm, Sports 32		Valparaiso	L 52–55	14–9 (7–4)	U.S. Cellular Arena (5,773); Milwaukee, WI
1/31/2012; 7:00 pm, Horizon League.com		Youngstown State	L 65–73	14–10 (7–5)	U.S. Cellular Arena (3,372); Milwaukee, WI
2/4/2012; 1:00 pm, Sports 32/HLN GOTW		at Green Bay	W 81–75	15–10 (8–5)	Resch Center (5,124); Green Bay, WI
2/10/2012; 8:00 pm, ESPN3		at Detroit	L 57–58	15–11 (8–6)	Calihan Hall (1,274); Detroit, MI
2/12/2012; 2:00 pm, Horizon League.com		at Wright State	L 46–70	15–12 (8–7)	Nutter Center (4,263); Dayton, OH
2/14/2012; 7:00 pm, Sports 32		Cleveland State	W 86–84	16–12 (9–7)	U.S. Cellular Arena (3,643); Milwaukee, WI
2/18/2012*; 3:00 pm, Horizon League.com		Fairfield; ESPNU Bracket Buster	W 67–63	17–12	U.S. Cellular Arena (5,683); Milwaukee, WI
2/23/2012; 7:00 pm, Sports 32		at UIC	W 72–61	18–12 (10–7)	UIC Pavilion (3,997); Chicago, IL
2/25/2012; 3:00 pm, Horizon League.com		at Loyola	W 78–69	19–12 (11–7)	Joseph J. Gentile Center (2,919); Chicago, IL
Horizon League tournament
2/28/2012; 7:00 pm, Sports 32/Horizon League.com		UIC; First Round	W 68–55	20–12	Klotsche Center (3,482); Milwaukee, WI
3/2/2012; 7:30 pm, Sports 32/Horizon League.com		vs. Butler; Second Round	L 49–71	20–13	Athletics-Recreation Center (2,239); Valparaiso, IN
2012 College Basketball Invitational
3/13/2012; 7:00 pm		at TCU; First Round	L 73–83	20–14	Daniel–Meyer Coliseum (1,062); Fort Worth, TX
*Non-conference game. ^{#}Rankings from AP Poll. (#) Tournament seedings in parentheses.

== Rankings ==
Ranking movement Legend: ¦¦ Improvement in ranking. ¦¦ Decrease in ranking. RV – Received votes.
Poll	Pre	Wk 1	Wk 2	Wk 3	Wk 4	Wk 5	Wk 6	Wk 7	Wk 8	Wk 9	Wk 10	Wk 11	Wk 12	Wk 13	Wk 14	Wk 15	Wk 16	WK 17	Wk 18	Final
AP	–	–	–	–	–	–	–	–	–	–	–	–	–	–	–	–	–		–	
Coaches	–	–	–	–	–	–	–	–	–	–	–	–	–	–	–	–	–	–	–	–
Mid-Major	RV	RV	RV	RV	RV	RV	RV	RV	RV	RV	23	–	–	–	–	–	–	–	–	–
