= 2011–12 Detroit Titans men's basketball team =

American college basketball season

2011–12 Detroit Titans men's basketball
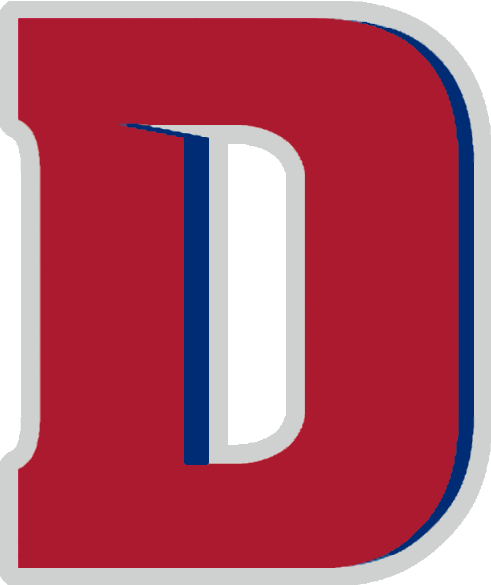

Horizon League tournament champions

NCAA tournament, Round of 64
- Conference: Horizon League
- Record: 22–14 (11–7 Horizon)
- Head coach: Ray McCallum (4th season)
- Assistant coaches: Carlos Briggs (5th season); Jay Smith (4th season); Derek Thomas (4th season)
- Home arena: Calihan Hall

2011–12 Horizon League men's basketball standings
	Conf.				Overall
Team	W		L	PCT	W		L	PCT
Valparaiso	14	–	4	.778	22	–	11	.667
Cleveland State	12	–	6	.667	22	–	11	.667
Detroit †	11	–	7	.611	22	–	14	.611
Milwaukee	11	–	7	.611	20	–	13	.606
Butler	11	–	7	.611	22	–	14	.611
Youngstown State	10	–	8	.556	16	–	15	.516
Green Bay	10	–	8	.556	15	–	15	.500
Wright State	7	–	11	.389	13	–	19	.406
UIC	3	–	15	.167	8	–	22	.267
Loyola Chicago	1	–	17	.056	7	–	23	.233
† 2012 Horizon League Tournament winner As of March 6, 2012; Rankings from AP Poll

The 2011–12 Detroit Titans men's basketball team represented the University of Detroit Mercy in the 2011–12 NCAA Division I men's basketball season. Led by fourth year coach Ray McCallum, the Titans played their home games at Calihan Hall as members of the Horizon League. They finished the season 22–14 overall, 11–7 in Horizon League play, and finished in a three-way tied for third place.

Playing in the Horizon League tournament as the No. 3 seed, they defeated Loyola (IL), Youngstown State, and Cleveland State to advance to the championship game. In the championship, Ray McCallum Jr. led the Titans with 21 points, as Detroit defeated No. 1 seed Valparaiso 70–50.

As tournament champions, they received an automatic bid to the NCAA tournament. The team was given a 15 seed in the Midwest Region, and were matched up with No. 2 seed Kansas in the second round. Despite 15 points from Doug Anderson, and 11 rebounds from Eli Holman, Kansas cruised to a 65–50 victory, ending the Titans season.

== Roster ==
2011–12 Detroit Titans men's basketball team
Players
Coaches

Pos.	#	Name	Height	Weight	Year	Hometown
G	1	Chase Simon	6 ft 7 in (2.01 m)	216 lb (98 kg)	Sr	Detroit, MI
G	2	Chris Blake (I)	6 ft 5 in (1.96 m)	180 lb (82 kg)	Sr	Mobile, AL
G	3	Ray McCallum, Jr.	6 ft 2 in (1.88 m)	188 lb (85 kg)	So	Beverly Hills, MI
G	5	Donavan Foster	5 ft 10 in (1.78 m)	160 lb (73 kg)	Sr	Chicago, IL
G	10	Jason Calliste	6 ft 2 in (1.88 m)	168 lb (76 kg)	Jr	Scarborough, ON
G	11	P.J. Boutte	5 ft 9 in (1.75 m)	150 lb (68 kg)	Fr	Indianapolis, IN
G	13	Brandon Romain	6 ft 3 in (1.91 m)	168 lb (76 kg)	Jr	Brooklyn, NY
F/C	20	LaMarcus Lowe	6 ft 11 in (2.11 m)	210 lb (95 kg)	Sr	Flint, MI
F	23	Doug Anderson	6 ft 6 in (1.98 m)	218 lb (99 kg)	Jr	Kalamazoo, MI
F	24	John Hoskins (I)	6 ft 10 in (2.08 m)	210 lb (95 kg)	Jr	Warren, MI
F	25	Juwan Howard, Jr. (redshirt)	6 ft 5 in (1.96 m)	220 lb (100 kg)	So	Detroit, MI
F/C	32	Eli Holman	6 ft 10 in (2.08 m)	260 lb (118 kg)	Sr	Richmond, CA
F	33	Evan Bruinsma	6 ft 8 in (2.03 m)	208 lb (94 kg)	So	New Era, MI
F	34	Nick Minnerath (injured) (redshirt)	6 ft 8 in (2.03 m)	220 lb (100 kg)	Sr	Truro, MA

Head coach

- Ray McCallum (Ball State)

Assistant coach(es)

- Carlos Briggs (Baylor)
- Jay Smith (Saginaw Valley State)
- Derek Thomas (Missouri–St. Louis)

Legend

- (C) Team captain
- (S) Suspended
- (I) Ineligible
- (W) Walk-on
- Injured
- Current redshirt

Roster
Last update: 2012-02-04

== Schedule ==
Date time, TV	Opponent	Result	Record	High points	High rebounds	High assists	Site (attendance) city, state
Exhibition
October 29*; 7:00 pm	Madonna	W 112–52	0–0	27 – Minnerath	10 – Lowe	8 – McCallum	Calihan Hall (1,637); Detroit, MI
November 5*; 7:00 pm	Ashland	W 96–65	0–0	24 – McCallum	6 – Minnerath/Foster	5 – Calliste	Calihan Hall (1,441); Detroit, MI
Regular season
November 11*; 7:00 pm, HLN	Lake Erie	W 95–57	1–0	24 – Simon	8 – Minnerath	7 – McCallum	Calihan Hall (1,647); Detroit, MI
November 14*; 9:00 pm, ESPNU/ESPN3	at Notre Dame; CBE Classic	L 53–59	1–1	20 – McCallum	11 – Simon	4 – McCallum/Calliste	Edmund P. Joyce Center (6,720); Notre Dame, IN
November 18*; 7:00 pm, HLN	Concordia (MI)	W 113–68	2–1	19 – Calliste	13 – Anderson	8 – Simon	Calihan Hall (1,551); Detroit, MI
November 21*; 5:00 pm, BGSUFalcons.com	vs. George Washington; CBE Classic	L 73–86	2–2	18 – Minnerath	10 – Lowe	4 – Calliste	Stroh Center (–); Bowling Green, OH
November 22*; 7:30 pm, BGSUFalcons.com	at Bowling Green; CBE Classic	L 61–67	2–3	17 – Bruinsma	9 – Calliste	3 – Calliste	Stroh Center (1,379); Bowling Green, OH
November 23*; 5:00 pm, BGSUFalcons.com	vs. Austin Peay; CBE Classic	W 94–93 ^{OT}	3–3	20 – Simon	12 – Bruinsma	3 – 3 tied	Stroh Center (159); Bowling Green, OH
November 26*; 7:00 pm, MAC-Sports.com	at Akron	L 63–81	3–4	27 – Simon	7 – Simon	4 – McCallum	James A. Rhodes Arena (2,585); Akron, OH
December 1; 7:00 pm, HLN	Youngstown State	L 61–64	3–5 (0–1)	21 – Simon/McCallum	10 – McCallum	5 – Foster	Calihan Hall (1,512); Detroit, MI
December 3; 2:00 pm, HLN	Cleveland State	L 61–66	3–6 (0–2)	17 – Anderson	6 – McCallum	3 – McCallum/Foster	Calihan Hall (1,880); Detroit, MI
December 5*; 7:00 pm, ESPN2/ESPN3	St. John's	W 69–63	4–6	21 – McCallum	8 – Anderson	4 – McCallum	Calihan Hall (5,377); Detroit, MI
December 8*; 7:30 pm, HLN	Western Michigan	W 92–81	5–6	21 – Holman	7 – Holman/Lowe	6 – McCallum	Calihan Hall (2,148); Detroit, MI
December 11*; 6:00 pm, ESPNU/ESPN3	at No. 15 Alabama	L 54–62	5–7	13 – McCallum	10 – Lowe	4 – McCallum	Coleman Coliseum (10,011); Tuscaloosa, AL
December 17*; 12:00 pm, FS Detroit/HLN	No. 16 Mississippi State	L 75–80	5–8	17 – McCallum/Simon	9 – Holman	5 – Boutte	Calihan Hall (2,217); Detroit, MI
December 22*; 7:00 pm, HLN	Alabama State	W 80–56	6–8	19 – McCallum	12 – Anderson	5 – McCallum	Calihan Hall (2,189); Detroit, MI
December 29; 8:00 pm, HLN	at UIC	L 59–63	6–9 (0–3)	14 – Simon	7 – Lowe	2 – Simon/Calliste	UIC Pavilion (2,162); Chicago, IL
December 31; 2:00 pm, HLN	at Loyola (IL)	W 65–54	7–9 (1–3)	17 – Simon	7 – McCallum	5 – McCallum	Joseph J. Gentile Center (1,564); Chicago, IL
January 6; 8:00 pm, ESPN3	Valparaiso	L 71–73	7–10 (1–4)	22 – McCallum	7 – Holman	3 – Boutte/Simon	Calihan Hall (2,271); Detroit, MI
January 8; 4:00 pm, ESPN3	Butler	W 76–65	8–10 (2–4)	16 – Calliste	5 – McCallum/Lowe	7 – McCallum	Calihan Hall (4,149); Detroit, MI
January 12; 8:00 pm, HLN	at Green Bay	W 80–73	9–10 (3–4)	16 – McCallum	7 – Lowe	4 – McCallum	Resch Center (2,142); Green Bay, WI
January 14; 8:00 pm, HLN	at Milwaukee	L 74–84	9–11 (3–5)	23 – McCallum	11 – Holman	4 – McCallum/Foster	U.S. Cellular Arena (4,038); Milwaukee, WI
January 21; 12:00 pm, FS Detroit/HLN	Wright State	W 69–53	10–11 (4–5)	16 – Simon	6 – Anderson/McCallum	4 – Simon	Calihan Hall (2,247); Detroit, MI
January 25; 7:00 pm, HLN	Loyola (IL)	W 67–52	11–11 (5–5)	15 – Holman	12 – Holman	6 – McCallum	Calihan Hall (1,985); Detroit, MI
January 27; 7:00 pm, HLN	UIC	W 70–66	12–11 (6–5)	26 – McCallum	8 – Holman	4 – McCallum	Calihan Hall (2,318); Detroit, MI
February 2; 8:05 pm, FS Detroit/HLN	at Valparaiso	L 73–78	12–12 (6–6)	14 – 3 tied	7 – Anderson	6 – McCallum	The Arc (3,488); Valparaiso, IN
February 4; 12:00 pm, ESPN2/ESPN3	at Butler	W 65–61	13–12 (7–6)	20 – McCallum	7 – Holman	4 – Simon	Hinkle Fieldhouse (10,000); Indianapolis, IN
February 10; 9:00 pm, ESPN3	Milwaukee	W 58–57	14–12 (8–6)	18 – McCallum	11 – Holman	2 – Holman	Calihan Hall (1,274); Detroit, MI
February 12; 1:00 pm, FS Detroit/HLN	Green Bay	W 77–74	15–12 (9–6)	24 – Simon	8 – Holman	6 – McCallum	Calihan Hall (1,923); Detroit, MI
February 15; 7:00 pm, HLN	at Wright State	W 71–55	16–12 (10–6)	14 – Calliste	10 – Holman	3 – McCallum	Nutter Center (3,565); Dayton, OH
February 18*; 2:00 pm, HLN	James Madison; BracketBusters	W 82–70	17–12	19 – Calliste	7 – Anderson	7 – McCallum	Calihan Hall (2,017); Detroit, MI
February 23; 7:00 pm, HLN	at Cleveland State	L 64–77	17–13 (10–7)	17 – Simon	10 – Simon	3 – McCallum	Wolstein Center (2,325); Cleveland, OH
February 25; 2:05 pm, WADL-TV 38/HLN	at Youngstown State	W 76–74	18–13 (11–7)	18 – Simon	6 – Lowe	6 – McCallum	Beeghly Center (2,004); Youngstown, OH
Horizon League tournament
February 28; 7:00 pm, HLN	Loyola (IL); First Round	W 80–71	19–13	20 – Holman	6 – Holman	4 – Calliste	Calihan Hall (1,917); Detroit, MI
March 2; 6:00 pm, ESPN3/HLN	vs. Youngstown State; Quarterfinal	W 93–76	20–13	22 – McCallum	10 – Holman	7 – McCallum	Athletics-Recreation Center (–); Valparaiso, IN
March 3; 6:00 pm, ESPNU/ESPN3	vs. Cleveland State; Semifinal	W 63–58	21–13	26 – McCallum	8 – Simon	5 – McCallum	Athletics-Recreation Center (–); Valparaiso, IN
March 6; 9:00 pm, ESPN/ESPN3	at Valparaiso; Championship Game	W 70–50	22–13	21 – McCallum	10 – Lowe	4 – Simon	Athletics-Recreation Center (4,258); Valparaiso, IN
2012 NCAA tournament
March 16*; 9:57 pm, TruTV	vs. No. MW2 Kansas; 1st Round	L 50–65	22–14	15 – Anderson	11 – Holman	5 – McCallum	CenturyLink Center (17,051); Omaha, NE
*Non-conference game. ^{#}Rankings from Coaches' Poll. (#) Tournament seedings in parentheses. All times are in Eastern Time..

== Game notes ==
Exhibition

Team	1st Half	2nd Half	Final
MAD	27	25	52
UDM	48	64	112

10/29/2011 – Detroit vs Madonna
Detroit played host to the Madonna University Crusaders, an NAIA school in the Titans' first exhibition game of the season. Nick Minnerath had a team high 27 points, going 5 of 8 from three-point range, grabbed 8 rebounds, and recorded 4 steals. Detroit led 48–27 at half-time, and scored 64 more in the second half en route to a 112–52 victory.

Team	1st Half	2nd Half	Final
ASH	32	33	65
UDM	55	41	96

11/05/2011 – Detroit vs Ashland
Detroit's final warmup game before the regular season came against NCAA Division II Ashland University Eagles. The Titans started strong, hitting 9 of their first 11 shots taken. Ashland fought back to get the game to 22–17 with 8 minutes remaining in the first half, but the Titans surged again to take the 55–32 lead at half-time with Jason Calliste scoring 15 points being 4–of–4 from the field along with five assists, two rebounds, and three steals in the opening frame as his team shot 76.9% on field goals. Detroit never looked back and ended the night with a 96–65 victory on 66.7% shooting. Ray McCallum shot 8–of–10 on the night and lead Detroit in scoring with 24 points, adding three steals and five rebounds.

November 2011

Team	1st Half	2nd Half	Final
LEC	20	37	57
UDM	48	47	95

11/11/2011 – Detroit vs Lake Erie
The Detroit Titans opened the season at Calihan Hall in dominant fashion, defeating the NCAA Division II Lake Erie College Storm 95–57. Lake Erie held Detroit scoreless for the first four minutes of the game, going up 6–0 before Nick Minnerath hit a three-pointer, his first points of 19 tallied in the half. Detroit eventually took the lead 11–10 and soon after scored 18 unanswered points, ending the half on a run of 37–8 to go up 48–20. Chase Simon led the charge in the second half, scoring 22 of his game high 24 points in the frame. Overall, he was 8–of–12 shooting in 28 minutes on the floor. Minnerath finished with 23 points and 8 rebounds in the victory, and Ray McCallum added 7 assists and 15 points.

Team	1st Half	2nd Half	Final
UDM	31	22	53
ND	28	31	59

11/14/2011 – Detroit at Notre Dame
Detroit faced its first difficult test of the season against the Notre Dame Fighting Irish of the Big East Conference in the College Basketball Experience Classic. Notre Dame connected on its first three jumpers to take an early 6–0 lead, but Ray McCallum hit three straight treys to lead the Titans to their first lead of the night at 9–8. Nick Minnerath was held to four minutes in the half, picking up three quick fouls. Detroit went on a 14–2 run to go up by 6 in the first half and would go into half-time with a 31–28 lead. The Titans started strong in the second half, stretching their lead to as much as 8 after a layup from McCallum to put the Titans up 41–33 with 14:04 remaining in the game. However, poor shooting plagued Detroit, as Notre Dame held the Titans without a field goal for almost 8 minutes, going on a 14–0 run to take a six–point lead. Detroit held Notre Dame at bay with its defense, but in the end could not overcome its shooting woes, losing to the Fighting Irish 59–53. McCallum lead all Titans with 20 points, contributing 4 assists and 7 rebounds. LaMarcus Lowe had a strong outing, posting 8 points, 10 rebounds, and 5 blocks.

Team	1st Half	2nd Half	Final
CON	37	31	68
UDM	48	65	113

11/18/2011 – Detroit vs Concordia (MI)
The Titans returned home to Calihan hall to face the NAIA Concordia University Ann Arbor Cardinals in coach Ray McCallum's 100th game leading Detroit. Detroit faced strong opposition with Concordia matching the Titans shot for shot for the first 11 minutes of the game, leading by as much as 5 after a layup by Jeremy Simmons put the Cardinals up 26–21. The Titans countered with a quick 9–0 run to go up 32–26 and never relinquished their lead. Detroit led 48–37 at the half, but let out a 62.5% field goal shooting offensive barrage in the second half, outscoring Concordia 65–31 en route to a 113–68 blowout. Jason Calliste landed a career-high six three-pointers and led all scoring with 19 points, Doug Anderson in his first start for Detroit contributed a double-double with 12 points and a team-high 13 rebounds, and Chase Simon came close to recording a triple-double, tallying 12 points, 9 rebounds, and 8 assists.

Team	1st Half	2nd Half	Final
UDM	28	45	73
GW	45	41	86

11/21/2011 – Detroit vs George Washington
Detroit traveled to Bowling Green State University to take part in the CBE Classic, playing their first of three games in three days against the George Washington Colonials. The Colonials had hot shooting throughout the game, hitting 53% of their field goals to take a 45–28 lead after the opening frame. The Titans were down by as much as 26 in the second half before they attempted to mount a furious comeback, going on a 26–6 run to bring the George Washington lead down to 6 at 77–71. The lead was too much to overcome, as the Colonials ran away with the game resulting in a Detroit loss, 86–73. Nick Minnerath led the team scoring with 18 points, and LaMarcus Lowe contributed 10 rebounds, 9 points, and 5 blocked shots.

Team	1st Half	2nd Half	Final
UDM	27	34	61
BGSU	26	41	67

11/22/2011 – Detroit at Bowling Green
In the second game of a three-game stint in the CBE Classic, the Titans faced host Bowling Green and the Falcons. Turnovers cost the Titans early, as they lost the ball 10 times in the first 10 minutes of the game. Nick Minnerath took a charge early from a Bowling Green player, resulting in a knee injury that left him in the locker room for the remainder of the game. It was later revealed that the charge tore his MCL, putting him out for the entire season and leaving Detroit with just eight remaining eligible players. Detroit overcame early shooting woes to lead 27–26 at halftime. The Titans had a few bursts of offense to start the second half, gaining two separate 5-point leads, but the undermanned roster couldn't overcome shooting woes and the loss of Minnerath, falling 67–61 to the Falcons. Evan Bruinsma stepped up and led all Titans in scoring with 17 points on 7–of–10 shooting, adding 7 rebounds. Jason Calliste had 16 points and 9 rebounds as the Titans fell to 2–3 on the year.

Team	1st Half	2nd Half	OT	Final
AP	37	43	13	93
UDM	50	30	14	94

11/23/2011 – Detroit vs Austin Peay
Detroit played its third and final game in three days of the CBE Classic in Bowling Green, Kentucky, taking on the Austin Peay Governors. Only eight Titans suited up for the game. Heavily undermanned with Eli Holman and Chris Blake still suspended and Nick Minnerath lost to an injury suffered the night before against Bowling Green State, Titans players Evan Bruinsma, Doug Anderson, and LaMarcus Lowe have been left to rise to the occasion. Anderson, Jason Calliste, and Chase Simon hit three-pointers in the first few minutes to give Detroit an early 16–8 lead. The Titans shot 54.3% from the field in the first half and 6–of–12 on three-pointers, taking a 50–37 lead at half-time. The second half was sloppy for Detroit, as they turned the ball over 12 times while Austin Peay continued to chip away at the lead, eventually tying the game 80–80 with 33 seconds left in regulation. The game went to overtime, where the Titans led for almost the entirety of the period. Simon and Calliste had Detroit perfect from the free throw line in the final 15 seconds. Austin Peay made a three-pointer as time expired, but it wasn't enough as the Titans held on for the win 94–93. Simon led the team in scoring with 20 points, Bruinsma had a double–double in 33 minutes, grabbing 12 rebounds and adding 15 points on 6–of–10 shooting.

Team	1st Half	2nd Half	Final
UDM	32	31	63
AKR	43	38	81

11/26/2011 – Detroit at Akron
The Titans traveled to the University of Akron, attempting to avenge an eight-point loss in their previous encounter a season ago against the Zips. The Titans led to start the game 9–2, but Akron soon caught up and pulled away early with a 14–2 run in the first half. The Zips never relinquished their lead, beating the Titnas 81–63. Chase Simon lead the team in scoring and rebounding, tallying 27 points on 10–of–15 shooting and 7 rebounds in 39 minutes, and was the only Titan player to score in double figures.

December 2011

Team	1st Half	2nd Half	Final
YSU	35	29	64
UDM	34	27	61

12/1/2011 – Detroit vs Youngstown State
The Titans began conference play by hosting the Youngstown State Penguins. Youngstown State got off to an early lead 12–4, but Detroit went on a 12–2 run to take the lead 16–14. The teams traded baskets before the Penguins got out to a five–point lead with just three seconds remaining in the half. Chase Simon his two free throws. On the inbound pass, Donovan Foster stripped the ball and gave it to Ray McCallum for the layup as time expired, bringing the Penguin lead down to just one at 35–34. There were many lead changes in the second half, with Detroit leading by as much as 5 at 55–50 with 5:40 remaining in the game, but Youngstown State marched back and took back the lead on a three–pointer by DuShawn Brooks after two consecutive missed free throws by Simon. The Penguins' Kendrick Perry made two key free throws with less than a second remaining. The Titans were unable to get a shot off from behind mid–court as Detroit fell 64–61, breaking a five–game winning streak against Youngstown State. Ray McCallum had his highest scoring output of the season, leading the team in scoring and rebounding with 21 points and 10 rebounds. Chase Simon also had 21 points, and LaMarcus Lowe added 4 points and 9 rebounds.

Team	1st Half	2nd Half	Final
CSU	37	29	66
UDM	31	30	61

12/3/2011 – Detroit vs Cleveland State
Detroit hosted the 7–1 Cleveland State Vikings to try again to get their first conference win. The Titans started slow, being held scoreless for the first 3:32 of the game. Cleveland State got off to a 12–4 lead, but Detroit went on a 10–0 run to take the lead by 2. There were six lead changes and seven ties in the half, but Cleveland State had a late surge to lead at the half 37–31, capitalizing on 12 Titan turnovers. In the second, the Vikings extended their lead to 14, only to be held scoreless for over six minutes and see the Titans go on a 13–2 run to bring the lead for CSU down to 3. Cleveland State stretched the lead back to 7 with 25 seconds remaining, and the Titans lost in the effort 66–61, falling to 3–6 on the season and 0–2 in conference play. Doug Anderson led the team in scoring for the first time this season, putting up 17 points on 5–of–7 shooting and 7–of–7 from the free throw line.

Team	1st Half	2nd Half	Final
SJU	21	42	63
UDM	32	37	69

12/5/2011 – Detroit vs St. John's
In commemoration of the hall–of–fame announcer and former head coach, the Detroit Titans unveiled "Dick Vitale Court" during a dedication ceremony prior to the night's game against the St. John's Red Storm in front of a packed crowd of 5,377, more than tripling Callihan Hall's average on the season. The Titans, in their 1970s throwback uniforms, jumped to a quick 8–0 lead to force a Red Storm time out. St. John's rallied to tie the game at 15 and later had a one–point lead, but Detroit took advantage of the Red Storm's inability to score a point for over eight minutes, retaking the lead and leading by double–digits. The Titans went into half–time up 32–21. The Red Storm led a furious comeback to start the second half, going on a 9–0 run to bring the Titan lead down to just a single bucket, but a jump shot from Chase Simon followed by a fast–break by Doug Anderson helped regain the momentum. St. John's attempted to mount several runs, but each time the Titans would answer, never letting the Red Storm be down just a single possession in the final 7:30 of the game. Detroit notched their first big non–conference win of the season, downing St. John's 69–63. Ray McCallum had 14 points in the second half as he led all Titans in scoring with 21 on the game. Doug Anderson grabbed 8 rebounds and scored 10 points. The game against St. John's marked the Titans debut of Brandon Romain, a transfer from Westchester Community College.

Team	1st Half	2nd Half	Final
WMU	39	42	81
UDM	61	31	92

12/8/2011 – Detroit vs Western Michigan
The Titans home game against the Western Michigan Broncos marked the return of their leading rebounder from last season, Eli Holman, who averaged 9.6 rebounds and 11.8 points per game. Coming off a suspension of more than 10 games, Holman scored 21 points from the bench to lead all Titans in scoring and tied LaMarcus Lowe with the most rebounds, grabbing 3 offensive rebounds and 7 overall. The Titans started with a 9–0 run and never looked back. They led by as much as 24 points at several moments in the first half before going into half–time up 61–39. The Titans faltered in the second half at times, letting Western Michigan pull within 9 with 3:36 remaining in the game, but the Titans protected the lead with a few key baskets and free throws as they defeated the Broncos 92–81. The Titans kept their turnovers far lower than average, losing the ball 8 times while dishing out 18 assists. This was the first game of the season where the Titans had 10 active players, just in time to travel to Tuscaloosa to face the nationally ranked Alabama Crimson Tide.

Team	1st Half	2nd Half	Final
UDM	22	32	54
ALA	38	24	62

12/11/2011 – Detroit at #16/15 Alabama
Detroit faced off with its most difficult road opponent of the regular season, taking on the Alabama Crimson Tide, a then Top 20 nationally ranked team. The Titans struggled early, going 0–for–10 on field goals to start the game, and the Tide capitalized, surging to a 12–1 lead. The Titans had great difficulty scoring in the first half, going just 7–of–29 from the field and 0–of–7 from 3, leading to a likely insurmountable 38–22 deficit at half–time. Detroit made many attempts in the second half to mount runs and cut into Alabama's lead, but every time the Titans would cut the lead to 10 or 12, Alabama would surge ahead again and again, stretching their lead to as much as 18 at 57–39 with 5:13 remaining. Detroit did not give up, ending the game on a 15–5 run to cut the lead to single digits, but the lead was too much to overcome as the Titans lost to the Crimson Tide 62–54. Detroit out–rebounded Alabama 38–26, including 18 offensive rebounds. Ray McCallum led the team in scoring with 13 points, adding 6 rebounds and 4 assists. LaMarcus Lowe grabbed 10 rebounds in the effort, and Eli Holman scored 9 points and grabbed 9 boards in 27 minutes off the bench.

Team	1st Half	2nd Half	Final
MSU	39	41	80
UDM	36	39	75

12/17/2011 – Detroit vs #17/16 Mississippi State
Detroit played its second Top 20 nationally ranked SEC foe in a row, this time hosting the Mississippi State Bulldogs. The Titans took an early 3–0 lead on a 3–pointer by Chase Simon. Mississippi State then went on a 15–4 run to go up 15–7. The Titans kept cutting into the lead, stopping every Bulldog attempt to pull away in the first half. Detroit fought back to tie the game three times, and went into half–time down three points at 39–36 Bulldogs. Mississippi State came out swinging in the second half, starting on a 10–0 run in the first 2:13 to extend their lead to 13 at 49–36. The Bulldogs would stretch their lead to 15 with 15:05 remaining in the game before the Titans mounted another run fueled by a dunk and tip–in from Eli Holman. PJ Boutte hit a layup and Chase Simon hit a 3–pointer to cut the Bulldog lead back down to 6. Mississippi State stretched the lead back to 11 with 7:26 remaining before the Titans mounted another comeback. Ray McCallum scored 8 points on a pair of threes and a layup and Eli Holman hit a jumper and a layup to bring the Titans within a single point at 66–65. The teams traded baskets until Simon converted on a 3–point play to the game at 70–70 with 2:31 remaining. The Bulldogs went out to another 4–point lead but Simon hit another key 3–pointer and McCallum hit another layup to tie the game again at 75–all. With the Titans down by a basket with 19 seconds to play, Holman went for a layup but was blocked by State player Arnett Moultrie. The Bulldogs hit several key free throws to put the game out of reach, beating the Titans 80–75. McCallum and Simon tied for a team high 17 points. Simon was 4–of–13, shooting a combined 6–of–24 (25%) against the two SEC opponents. Holman contributed 12 points and a team high 9 rebounds off the bench in just 17 minutes of play.

Team	1st Half	2nd Half	Final
ALST	34	22	56
UDM	40	40	80

12/22/2011 – Detroit vs Alabama State
After dropping five of their last seven games, Detroit tried to get their season out of disarray, hosting the Alabama State Hornets of the Southwestern Athletic Conference. The game did not start as the Titans had intended, trailing for the majority of the first half. Alabama State took an early five-point lead on a three-pointer by Ivory White six minutes into the game. The Hornets led by as much as six, keeping the Titans at bay for the majority of the first half before the Titans went on a 7–0 run to take the lead at 25–24. Detroit ended the half on a 10–4 run to take a 40–34 lead at half-time. Early in the second half up just 48–43, Eli Holman had a slam dunk and Doug Anderson followed it up with two more, permanently shifting the momentum in favor of the Titans. Detroit finished the remainder of the game on a 32–13 run to beat Alabama State 80–56. Anderson posted 16 points on 6–of–8 shooting and 12 rebounds and Ray McCallum added 19 points and 5 assists.

Team	1st Half	2nd Half	Final
UDM	28	31	59
UIC	30	33	63

12/29/2011 – Detroit at UIC
Looking for their first conference win, the Titans traveled to Chicago, Illinois to meet the UIC Flames. UIC jumped out to a 16–5 lead to start the game, but the Titans responded with a 9–0 run to bring Detroit within a single score. Eli Holman scored from under the rim to tie the game at 18–all, and Doug Anderson followed it up with a two-handed slam dunk to take the lead by two. Despite being up large early in the game, the Flames went into half-time with a narrow 30–28 lead. The Titans only shortly regained the lead with six minutes remaining in the game on a jumper in the paint by Chase Simon, but UIC retook the lead on a three-pointer by Gary Talton. The Titans were down 61–59 with 11.8 seconds remaining, and Jason Calliste, a 76% free-throw shooter, managed to draw a foul with 2.8 seconds left in the game. He went on to miss the front-end of a one–and–one, and Flames guard Daniel Barnes pulled down the rebound and hit two free throws to end the game in a 63–59 defeat for the Titans. Detroit fell to 0–3 in conference play and 7–10 overall.

Team	1st Half	2nd Half	Final
UDM	27	38	65
LUC	24	30	54

12/31/2011 – Detroit at Loyola Chicago
Following their loss to UIC two days prior, the Titans traveled across town to face Loyola Chicago. The Ramblers led for almost the entirety of the first half, stretching their lead as high as eight before the Titans mounted a comeback culminating in a successful three-point play by Doug Anderson to take the lead going into half-time 27–24. Detroit had an early 8–0 run in the second half to go up 34–26, and continued to hold Loyola at bay, stretching their lead into double digits multiple times. The Ramblers got as close as 44–39 at the 8:44 mark from a layup by Denzel Brito, but the Titans never let up, defeating Loyola 65–54 and gaining their first conference win of the season. Chase Simon led the team in scoring with 17, and Ray McCallum added 13 points, leading the Titans in rebounding (7) and assists (5).

January 2012

Team	1st Half	2nd Half	Final
VAL	32	41	73
UDM	35	36	71

1/6/2012 – Detroit vs Valparaiso
The Titans started the new calendar year with a bout at Calihan Hall against the Valparaiso Crusaders. Valpo ran out to an early eight-point lead to go up 12–4, but the Titans answered with a 16–1 run to go up 20–13. The Titans stretched their lead to double digits many times throughout the first half, but the Crusaders chipped away at the lead before going into half-time down just 3 at 35–32 Detroit. Valpo retook a small lead early in the second half, but the Titans kept battling back in the first four minutes, leading to three lead changes before the media timeout. After several more lead changes, the Crusaders took a six-point lead with 4:29 remaining. With the Titans down 67–63 with 2:33 to play, Chase Simon hit a three-pointer and Eli Holman hit a jumper after getting a blocked shot at the other end to take the lead 68–67 with 1:28 left. Ryan Brokehoff hit a jump shot to put Valparaiso back in front by 1, and Eli Holman countered by grabbing his own missed shot for an offensive rebound and hitting another big shot and successfully converted a three-point play to put the Titans back out in front 71–69 with 47 seconds left. The Crusaders' Jay Harris hit a layup to tie the game once again at 71–71, giving the Titans a chance to have the final shot with just 26 seconds remaining. With still 10 seconds left, Chase Simon started driving inside the lane to the hoop, knocking a Valpo player over and being called for an offensive foul for charging. With 5 seconds still left on the clock, Erik Buggs drove the length of the court and hit a layup at the buzzer to give Valparaiso the victory 73–71.
