= 2011–12 Wright State Raiders men's basketball team =

American college basketball season

2011–12 Wright State Raiders men's basketball
- Conference: Horizon League
- Record: 13–19 (7–11 Horizon)
- Head coach: Billy Donlon
- Assistant coaches: Clayton Bates; Chris Moore; Scott Woods
- Home arena: Nutter Center

2011–12 Horizon League men's basketball standings
	Conf.				Overall
Team	W		L	PCT	W		L	PCT
Valparaiso	14	–	4	.778	22	–	11	.667
Cleveland State	12	–	6	.667	22	–	11	.667
Detroit †	11	–	7	.611	22	–	14	.611
Milwaukee	11	–	7	.611	20	–	13	.606
Butler	11	–	7	.611	22	–	14	.611
Youngstown State	10	–	8	.556	16	–	15	.516
Green Bay	10	–	8	.556	15	–	15	.500
Wright State	7	–	11	.389	13	–	19	.406
UIC	3	–	15	.167	8	–	22	.267
Loyola Chicago	1	–	17	.056	7	–	23	.233
† 2012 Horizon League Tournament winner As of March 6, 2012; Rankings from AP Poll

The 2011–12 Wright State Raiders men's basketball team represented Wright State University in the 2011–12 NCAA Division I men's basketball season. Their head coach was Billy Donlon, serving his second year. The Raiders played their home games at the Nutter Center and are members of the Horizon League. They lost in the first round of the Horizon League tournament to Butler.

== Roster ==
2011–12 Wright State Raiders men's basketball team
Players
Coaches

Pos.	#	Name	Height	Weight	Year	Hometown
G	2	Brooklyn Bradley	6 ft 3 in (1.91 m)	175 lb (79 kg)	Fr	Dayton, OH
G	3	Reggie Arceneaux	5 ft 9 in (1.75 m)	160 lb (73 kg)	Fr	Charlotte, NC
F	4	Johann Mpondo	6 ft 8 in (2.03 m)	245 lb (111 kg)	Sr	Douala, CM
G	5	John Balwigaire	6 ft 2 in (1.88 m)	185 lb (84 kg)	Jr	Hemet, CA
G	10	Jason Cuffee	6 ft 3 in (1.91 m)	210 lb (95 kg)	Fr	Poca, WV
F	12	Armond Battle	6 ft 7 in (2.01 m)	210 lb (95 kg)	Jr	Plymouth, MN
G	15	Kendall Griffin	6 ft 4 in (1.93 m)	210 lb (95 kg)	Fr	Avon, IN
G	20	Ulysses Thomas	6 ft 3 in (1.91 m)	185 lb (84 kg)	Fr	Cincinnati, OH
G	21	Vance Hall	6 ft 3 in (1.91 m)	185 lb (84 kg)	So	Frankfort, KY
F	22	Cole Darling	6 ft 8 in (2.03 m)	200 lb (91 kg)	So	Holt, MI
F	23	A.J. Pacher	6 ft 10 in (2.08 m)	245 lb (111 kg)	So	Vandalia, OH
G	24	Matt Vest	6 ft 5 in (1.96 m)	200 lb (91 kg)	So	Kettering, OH
F	30	Stephen Gossard	6 ft 6 in (1.98 m)	205 lb (93 kg)	Fr	Waynesville, OH
F	32	Alex Pritchett	6 ft 7 in (2.01 m)	240 lb (109 kg)	Fr	Bedford, IN
G	34	Julius Mays	6 ft 2 in (1.88 m)	195 lb (88 kg)	Jr	Marion, IN
F	44	Tavares Sledge	6 ft 9 in (2.06 m)	225 lb (102 kg)	Fr	Brookwood, AL

Head coach

- Billy Donlon (UNC Wilmington)

Assistant coach(es)

- Clayton Bates (Florida)
- Chris Moore (Kentucky State)
- Scott Woods (Rose–Hulman)

Legend

- (C) Team captain
- (S) Suspended
- (I) Ineligible
- (W) Walk-on
- Injured
- Current redshirt

Roster
Last update: 2010-11-12

== Schedule ==
Date time, TV	Opponent	Result	Record	Site city, state
Exhibition
Nov. 5*; 7:00 pm	Central State	L 50–56		Nutter Center (3,179); Fairborn, OH
Regular season
Nov. 11*; 9:00 pm, BTN	at No. 3 Ohio State; Global Sports Shootout	L 42–73	0–1	Value City Arena (15,645); Columbus, OH
Nov. 13*; 3:00 pm	Kenyon	W 80–56	1–1	Nutter Center (2,583); Fairborn, OH
Nov. 16*; 7:00 pm	Jackson State; Global Sports Shootout	W 56–39	2–1	Nutter Center (3,159); Fairborn, OH
Nov. 21*; 7:00 pm, Sun Sports	vs. No. 10 Florida; Global Sports Shootout	L 65–78	2–2	St. Pete Times Forum (6,331); Tampa, FL
Nov. 23*; 7:00 pm	at North Florida; Global Sports Shootout	L 52–69	2–3	UNF Arena (824); Jacksonville, FL
Nov. 26*; 7:00 pm	Charlotte	L 66–70	2–4	Nutter Center (2,993); Fairborn, OH
Dec. 1; 7:00 pm	Cleveland State	L 43–45	2–5 (0–1)	Nutter Center (3,349); Fairborn, OH
Dec. 3; 3:00 pm	Youngstown State	W 63–62	3–5 (1–1)	Nutter Center (2,879); Fairborn, OH
Dec. 7*; 9:00 pm	at Air Force	L 34–55	3–6	Clune Arena (1,471); Colorado Springs, CO
Dec. 10*; 3:30 pm, ONN	at Miami	W 51–39	4–6	Millett Hall (2,544); Oxford, OH
Dec. 14*; 7:00 pm, ESPN2	Cincinnati	L 58–78	4–7	Nutter Center (5,977); Fairborn, OH
Dec. 17*; 7:00 pm	Ohio	L 54–82	4–8	Nutter Center (3,749); Fairborn, OH
Dec. 20*; 7:00 pm	Idaho	W 80–78 ^{OT}	5–8	Nutter Center (3,040); Fairborn, OH
Dec. 22*; 7:00 pm	Central Michigan	W 60–42	6–8	Nutter Center (3,684); Fairborn, OH
Dec. 29; 8:00 pm	at Loyola	W 64–48	7–8 (2–1)	Joseph J. Gentile Center (1,429); Chicago, IL
Dec. 31; 2:00 pm	at UIC	W 74–70 ^{OT}	8–8 (3–1)	UIC Pavilion (1,836); Chicago, IL
Jan. 6; 9:00 pm, ESPNU/ESPN3	Butler	L 62–63	8–9 (3–2)	Nutter Center (6,588); Fairborn, OH
Jan. 8; 3:00 pm	Valparaiso	W 73–55	9–9 (3–3)	Nutter Center (3,736); Fairborn, OH
Jan. 12; 8:00 pm	at Milwaukee	L 38–58	9–10 (4–3)	U.S. Cellular Arena (2,364); Milwaukee, WI
Jan. 14; 2:00 pm, HLN	at Green Bay	L 56–57	9–11 (4–4)	Resch Center (3,449); Green Bay, WI
Jan. 21; 12:00 pm, Fox Sports	at Detroit	L 53–69	10–11 (4–5)	Calihan Hall (2,247); Detroit, MI
Jan. 25; 7:00 pm	UIC	W 69–63	10–12 (5–5)	Nutter Center (3,578); Fairborn, OH
Jan. 27; 7:00 pm	Loyola	W 47–41	11–12 (6–5)	Nutter Center (4,743); Fairborn, OH
Feb. 2; 7:00 pm	at Butler	L 53–64	11–13 (6–6)	Hinkle Fieldhouse (6,543); Indianapolis, IN
Feb. 4; 8:00 pm	at Valparaiso	L 54–63	11–14 (6–7)	Athletics–Recreation Center (4,727); Valparaiso, IN
Feb. 10; 9:00 pm, ESPNU/ESPN3	Green Bay	L 48–53	11–15 (6–8)	Nutter Center (4,557); Fairborn, OH
Feb. 12; 3:00 pm	Milwaukee; Academic Recognition Day	W 70–46	12–15 (7–8)	Nutter Center (4,263); Fairborn, OH
Feb. 15; 7:00 pm	Detroit	L 55–71	12–16 (7–9)	Nutter Center (3,565); Fairborn, OH
Feb. 18; 5:05 pm	at UMKC; Bracket Busters	W 76–62	13–16	Swinney Recreation Center (888); Kansas City, MO
Feb. 23; 7:00 pm	at Youngstown State	L 54–61	13–17 (7–10)	Beeghly Center (1,953); Youngstown, OH
Feb. 25; 2:00 pm	at Cleveland State	L 55–77	13–18 (7–11)	Wolstein Center (3,891); Cleveland, OH
Horizon League tournament
Feb. 28; 7:00 pm, HLN	at Butler; First Round	L 52–70	13–19	Hinkle Fieldhouse (4,042); Indianapolis, IN
*Non-conference game. ^{#}Rankings from Coaches' Poll. (#) Tournament seedings in parentheses. All times are in Eastern Time. HLN = Horizon League Network. BTN = Big Ten Network. ONN = Ohio News Network..

== Awards and honors ==
Johann Mpondo	Raider Award
Julius Mays	Second Team All Horizon League
Julius Mays	Horizon League Newcomer of the Year
Julius Mays	Horizon League All Newcomer Team

== Statistics ==
Number	Name	Games	Average	Points	Assists	Rebounds
34	Julius Mays	30	14.1	423	74	85
3	Reggie Arceneaux	32	8.5	272	68	64
12	Armond Battle	30	6.8	205	26	105
22	Cole Darling	30	6.3	190	23	109
23	AJ Pacher	32	5.4	173	11	108
21	Vance Hall	30	4.5	134	27	45
5	John Balwigaire	31	4.3	133	32	38
4	Johann Mpondo	32	4.1	131	7	105
44	Tavares Sledge	31	3.1	96	7	88
24	Matt Vest	20	2.1	42	15	20
15	Kendall Griffin	25	2.0	49	16	33
10	Jason Cuffee	16	0.4	6	13	11
30	Stephen Gossard	9	0.3	3	0	1
20	Ulysses Thomas	10	0.0	0	0	1
