= 2011–12 Butler Bulldogs men's basketball team =

American college basketball season

2011–12 Butler Bulldogs men's basketball
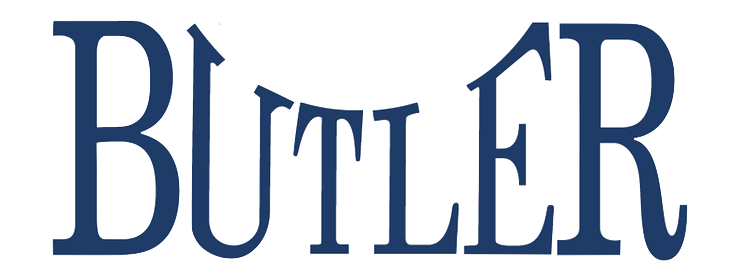

CBI Semifinals
- Conference: Horizon League
- Record: 22–15 (11–7 Horizon)
- Head coach: Brad Stevens (5th season)
- Assistant coaches: Matthew Graves (9th season); Terry Johnson (5th season); Michael Lewis (1st season)
- Home arena: Hinkle Fieldhouse

2011–12 Horizon League men's basketball standings
	Conf.				Overall
Team	W		L	PCT	W		L	PCT
Valparaiso	14	–	4	.778	22	–	11	.667
Cleveland State	12	–	6	.667	22	–	11	.667
Detroit †	11	–	7	.611	22	–	14	.611
Milwaukee	11	–	7	.611	20	–	13	.606
Butler	11	–	7	.611	22	–	14	.611
Youngstown State	10	–	8	.556	16	–	15	.516
Green Bay	10	–	8	.556	15	–	15	.500
Wright State	7	–	11	.389	13	–	19	.406
UIC	3	–	15	.167	8	–	22	.267
Loyola Chicago	1	–	17	.056	7	–	23	.233
† 2012 Horizon League Tournament winner As of March 6, 2012; Rankings from AP Poll

The 2011–12 Butler Bulldogs men's basketball team represented Butler University in the 2011–12 NCAA Division I men's basketball season. Their head coach was Brad Stevens, serving his 5th year. The Bulldogs played their home games at Hinkle Fieldhouse, which has a capacity of approximately 10,000 and a playing floor that was renovated during the summer of 2011. This was Butler's last season competing in the Horizon League.

In each of the previous two seasons, the Bulldogs reached the NCAA championship game after winning the Horizon League regular season, and Butler was the favorite to win the Horizon League for a sixth consecutive season in spite of losing senior and four-year starter Matt Howard to graduation and junior Shelvin Mack to the NBA draft. Analyst Jeff Borzello of CBS Sports explained "Butler loses a lot of talent from last season, but it's still tough to choose against the Bulldogs." The Bulldogs add Roosevelt Jones, a three-star recruit ranked in the 2011 Rivals 150 and the 33rd best freshman small forward in the nation, and also add Australian guard Jackson Aldridge, who "drew rave reviews playing in the U-19 world championships." Further, the Bulldogs add Kameron Woods, a two-star recruit and the 62nd best power forward in the nation according to ESPN.com. The final member of the recruit class is Andy Smeathers, a "local kid who knows how to make shots."

== 2011 recruiting class ==
College recruiting information
Name	Hometown	School	Height	Weight	Commit date
Jackson Aldridge; Point Guard	Lane Cove, New South Wales	Saint Ignatius' College, Riverview	6 ft 1 in (1.85 m)	187 lb (85 kg)	Jul 18, 2010
Jackson Aldridge; Point Guard	Recruit ratings: Scout: ESPN:				
Roosevelt Jones; Small Forward	O'Fallon, IL	O'Fallon Township HS	6 ft 4 in (1.93 m)	210 lb (95 kg)	Apr 29, 2010
Roosevelt Jones; Small Forward	Recruit ratings: Scout: Rivals: ESPN:				
Andy Smeathers; Small Forward	Bargersville, IN	Center Grove HS	6 ft 6 in (1.98 m)	175 lb (79 kg)	Jul 19, 2010
Andy Smeathers; Small Forward	Recruit ratings: Scout: Rivals: ESPN:				
Kameron Woods; Power Forward	Middletown, KY	Eastern HS	6 ft 8 in (2.03 m)	180 lb (82 kg)	Aug 24, 2010
Kameron Woods; Power Forward	Recruit ratings: Scout: Rivals: ESPN:				
Overall recruit ranking:
Note: In many cases, Scout, Rivals, 247Sports, On3, and ESPN may conflict in their listings of height and weight.; In these cases, the average was taken. ESPN grades are on a 100-point scale.; Sources: "Yahoo Sports: Rivals.com 2011 Butler Commitments". Rivals.; "Men's Basketball Recruiting – Scouts". Scout.; "ESPN – Butler Bulldogs Basketball Recruiting 2011". ESPN.; "Scout.com Team Recruiting Rankings". Scout.; "2011 Team Ranking". Rivals.

== Roster ==
2011–12 Butler Bulldogs men's basketball team
Players
Coaches

Pos.	#	Name	Height	Weight	Year	Previous school	Hometown
G	11	Jackson Aldridge	6 ft 1 in (1.85 m)	187 lb (85 kg)	Fr	Riverview	Lane Cove, Australia
G	3	Alex Barlow (W)	5 ft 11 in (1.8 m)	185 lb (84 kg)	Fr	Archbishop Moeller	Springboro, OH
F	32	Garrett Butcher (C)	6 ft 7 in (2.01 m)	209 lb (95 kg)	Sr	Edgewood	Ellettsville, IN
G		Rotnei Clarke (redshirt)	6 ft 0 in (1.83 m)	184 lb (83 kg)	RS Jr	Verdigris (Arkansas)	Claremore, OK
F	4	Erik Fromm	6 ft 9 in (2.06 m)	220 lb (100 kg)	So	Bloomington South	Bloomington, IN
G	20	Chrishawn Hopkins	6 ft 1 in (1.85 m)	165 lb (75 kg)	So	Manual	Indianapolis, IN
F	21	Roosevelt Jones	6 ft 4 in (1.93 m)	210 lb (95 kg)	Fr	O'Fallon	O'Fallon, IL
G	22	Elliott Kampen (W)	6 ft 5 in (1.96 m)	185 lb (84 kg)	Fr	Yorktown	Yorktown, IN
C	30	Emerson Kampen (W)	6 ft 9 in (2.06 m)	189 lb (86 kg)	RS Jr	Yorktown	Yorktown, IN
F	23	Khyle Marshall	6 ft 7 in (2.01 m)	210 lb (95 kg)	So	Flanagan	Davie, FL
G	5	Ronald Nored (C)	6 ft 0 in (1.83 m)	174 lb (79 kg)	Sr	Homewood	Homewood, AL
F	0	Andrew Smeathers	6 ft 6 in (1.98 m)	175 lb (79 kg)	Fr	Center Grove	Bargersville, IN
C	44	Andrew Smith	6 ft 11 in (2.11 m)	239 lb (108 kg)	Jr	Covenant Christian	Indianapolis, IN
G	33	Chase Stigall	6 ft 4 in (1.93 m)	195 lb (88 kg)	RS Jr	New Castle Chrysler	New Castle, IN
F	31	Kameron Woods	6 ft 8 in (2.03 m)	180 lb (82 kg)	Fr	Eastern	Middletown, KY

Head coach

- Brad Stevens (DePauw)

Assistant coach(es)

- Matthew Graves (Butler)
- Terry Johnson (Purdue Fort Wayne)
- Michael Lewis (Indiana)

Legend

- (C) Team captain
- (S) Suspended
- (I) Ineligible
- (W) Walk-on
- Injured
- Current redshirt

Roster
Last update: 27 July 2011

Source: 2011–12 Butler Men's Basketball Roster

== Schedule ==
Date time, TV	Rank^{#}	Opponent^{#}	Result	Record	High points	High rebounds	High assists	Site (attendance) city, state
Exhibition
Nov. 02*; 7:00 pm		Northern State	L 50–53	–	19 – Smith	8 – Smith	6 – Nored	Hinkle Fieldhouse (5,544); Indianapolis, IN
Nov. 05*; 7:00 pm		Franklin	W 91–53	–	19 – Smith	8 – Jones	8 – Nored	Hinkle Fieldhouse (8,586); Indianapolis, IN
Non-conference regular season
Nov. 12*; 3:00 pm, WNDY		at Evansville	L 77–80 ^{OT}	0–1	22 – Hopkins	9 – Smith	5 – Hopkins	Ford Center (9,454); Evansville, IN
Nov. 15*; 7:00 pm, WNDY		Chattanooga; Hoosier Invitational	W 57–46	1–1	16 – Smith	10 – Smith	5 – Tied	Hinkle Fieldhouse (6,078); Indianapolis, IN
Nov. 19*; 2:00 pm, ESPN3		No. 8/7 Louisville	L 53–69	1–2	20 – Marshall	6 – Marshall	7 – Nored	Hinkle Fieldhouse (9,071); Indianapolis, IN
Nov. 21*; 7:00 pm, WNDY		Savannah State; Hoosier Invitational	W 57–42	2–2	11 – Smith	6 – Tied	5 – Nored	Hinkle Fieldhouse (5,080); Indianapolis, IN
Nov. 23*; 7:00 pm, WNDY		Gardner–Webb; Hoosier Invitational	W 68–66	3–2	22 – Hopkins	6 – Smith	7 – Nored	Hinkle Fieldhouse (6,036); Indianapolis, IN
Nov. 27*; 7:00 pm, BTN		at Indiana; Hoosier Invitational	L 59–75	3–3	19 – Hopkins	7 – Smith	2 – Tied	Assembly Hall (17,265); Bloomington, IN
Nov. 29*; 7:00 pm, WNDY		Oakland City	W 98–53	4–3	17 – Smeathers	12 – Smith	7 – Nored	Hinkle Fieldhouse (5,677); Indianapolis, IN
Dec. 03; 2:00 pm, WNDY		Valparaiso	L 71–77 ^{OT}	4–4 (0–1)	17 – Nored	11 – Woods	6 – Nored	Hinkle Fieldhouse (7,239); Indianapolis, IN
Dec. 07*; 9:00 pm, ESPN		No. 8/8 Xavier	L 61–73	4–5	10 – Tied	11 – Jones	5 – Nored	Hinkle Fieldhouse (7,033); Indianapolis, IN
Dec. 10*; 2:00 pm, Hometown Sports		at Ball State	L 55–58	4–6	21 – Marshall	16 – Marshall	4 – Aldridge	John E. Worthen Arena (8,412); Muncie, IN
Dec. 17*; 2:00 pm, CBS		vs. Purdue; Close the Gap Crossroads Classic	W 67–65	5–6	12 – Tied	7 – Nored	4 – Jones	Conseco Fieldhouse (18,165); Indianapolis, IN
Dec. 20*; 9:00 pm, ESPN2		at Gonzaga	L 55–71	5–7	16 – Fromm	7 – Tied	5 – Nored	McCarthey Athletic Center (6,000); Spokane, WA
Dec. 22*; 9:00 pm, Fox Sports Net		at Stanford	W 71–66	6–7	18 – Nored	9 – Jones	5 – Nored	Maples Pavilion (5,693); Stanford, CA
Horizon League Play
Dec. 29; 7:00 pm, ESPN3/WNDY		Green Bay	W 53–49	7–7 (1–1)	13 – Tied	12 – Jones	4 – Nored	Hinkle Fieldhouse (7,550); Indianapolis, IN
Dec. 31; 2:00 pm, ESPN3/WNDY		Milwaukee	W 54–50	8–7 (2–1)	12 – Hopkins	7 – Tied	5 – Hopkins	Hinkle Fieldhouse (7,291); Indianapolis, IN
Jan. 06; 9:00 pm, ESPNU		at Wright State	W 63–62	9–7 (3–1)	19 – Smith	5 – Jones	4 – Jones	Ervin J. Nutter Center (6,588); Fairborn, OH
Jan. 08; 4:00 pm, ESPN3		at Detroit	L 65–76	9–8 (3–2)	13 – Nored	5 – Jones	3 – Hopkins	Calihan Hall (4,149); Detroit, MI
Jan. 13; 7:00 pm, ESPNU/ESPN3		Cleveland State	L 69–76	9–9 (3–3)	13 – Smith	8 – Woods	7 – Nored	Hinkle Fieldhouse (7,994); Indianapolis, IN
Jan. 15; 2:00 pm, WNDY		Youngstown State	W 71–55	10–9 (4–3)	20 – Smith	10 – Woods	7 – Nored	Hinkle Fieldhouse (7,298); Indianapolis, IN
Jan. 19; 8:00 pm, HLN		at UIC	W 57–49	11–9 (5–3)	16 – Jones	10 – Marshall	7 – Nored	UIC Pavilion (5,931); Chicago, IL
Jan. 21; 2:00 pm, WNDY/HLN		at Loyola	W 63–57	12–9 (6–3)	16 – Nored	13 – Smith	9 – Nored	Joseph J. Gentile Center (4,347); Chicago, IL
Jan. 26; 8:00 pm, ESPN3		at Milwaukee	L 42–53	12–10 (6–4)	11 – Smith	9 – Nored	4 – Smith	US Cellular Arena (6,435); Milwaukee, WI
Jan. 28; 7:00 pm, ESPNU		at Green Bay	L 68–80	12–11 (6–5)	16 – Jones	8 – Jones	2 – Tied	Resch Center (5,820); Green Bay, WI
Feb. 02; 7:00 pm, WNDY		Wright State	W 64–53	13–11 (7–5)	13 – Hopkins	11 – Jones	4 – Nored	Hinkle Fieldhouse (6,543); Indianapolis, IN
Feb. 04; 12:00 pm, ESPN2		Detroit	L 61–65	13–12 (7–6)	18 – Smith	12 – Jones	9 – Nored	Hinkle Fieldhouse (10,000); Indianapolis, IN
Feb. 09; 7:05 pm, ESPN3		at Youngstown State	W 68–59	14–12 (8–6)	19 – Hopkins	11 – Nored	6 – Nored	Beeghly Center (4,076); Youngstown, OH
Feb. 11; 11:00 am, ESPN2		at Cleveland State	W 52–49	15–12 (9–6)	17 – Jones	8 – Marshall	4 – Nored	Wolstein Center (5,021); Cleveland, OH
Feb. 14; 7:00 pm, ESPN3/WNDY		Loyola	W 63–57	16–12 (10–6)	13 – Hopkins	6 – Hopkins	9 – Nored	Hinkle Fieldhouse (5,812); Indianapolis, IN
Feb. 18*; 2:00 pm, WNDY		Indiana State; Bracket Buster	W 75–54	17–12	12 – Smith	12 – Jones	10 – Nored	Hinkle Fieldhouse (10,000); Indianapolis, IN
Feb. 21; 7:00 pm, WNDY		UIC	W 69–44	18–12 (11–6)	13 – Jones	10 – Jones	8 – Nored	Hinkle Fieldhouse (6,529); Indianapolis, IN
Feb. 24; 7:00 pm, ESPNU		at Valparaiso	L 59–71	18–13 (11–7)	17 – Marshall	5 – Tied	8 – Nored	Athletics-Recreation Center (5,237); Valparaiso, IN
Horizon League tournament
Feb. 28; 7:00 pm, HLN		Wright State; First Round	W 70–52	19–13	25 – Smith	9 – Woods	6 – Nored	Hinkle Fieldhouse (4,042); Indianapolis, IN
Mar. 02; 8:30 pm, ESPN3/HLN		vs. Milwaukee; Quarterfinal	W 71–49	20–13	17 – Tied	10 – Marshall	6 – Nored	Athletics-Recreation Center (2,239); Valparaiso, IN
Mar. 03; 8:30 pm, ESPNU/ESPN3		at Valparaiso; Semifinal	L 46–65	20–14	18 – Hopkins	6 – Fromm	4 – Nored	Athletics-Recreation Center (4,716); Valparaiso, IN
College Basketball Invitational
Mar. 14; 8:00 pm, HDNet		Delaware; First Round	W 75–58	21–14	17 – Hopkins	7 – Smith	3 – Tied	Hinkle Fieldhouse (2,349); Indianapolis, IN
Mar. 19; 8:00 pm, HDNet		at Penn; Quarterfinals	W 63–53	22–14	15 – Hopkins	13 – Marshall	6 – Nored	The Palestra (3,864); Philadelphia, PA
Mar. 21; 7:00 pm, HDNet		Pittsburgh; Semifinals	L 62–68 ^{OT}	22–15	22 – Marshall	8 – Marshall	4 – Tied	Hinkle Fieldhouse (3,754); Indianapolis, IN
*Non-conference game. ^{#}Rankings from AP Poll/Coaches' Poll. (#) Tournament seedings in parentheses. All times are in Eastern Time. HLN = Horizon League Network. BTN = Big Ten Network.

Source: 2011–12 Butler Bulldogs men's basketball schedule

== Rankings ==
Ranking movement Legend: ██ Improvement in ranking. ██ Decrease in ranking. RV=Others receiving votes.
Poll	Pre	Wk 1	Wk 2	Wk 3	Wk 4	Wk 5	Wk 6	Wk 7	Wk 8	Wk 9	Wk 10	Wk 11	Wk 12	Wk 13	Wk 14	Wk 15	Wk 16	Wk 17	Wk 18	Final
AP	RV	RV	–	–	–	–	–	–	–	–	–	–	–	–	–	–	–	–	–	–
Coaches	RV	RV	–	–	–	–	–	–	–	–	–	–	–	–	–	–	–	–	–	–
Mid-Major	2	9	14	14	24	RV	RV	RV	RV	RV	–	–	–	–	RV	RV	–	RV	–	–

== Preseason ==
=== Departures ===
Name	Number	Pos.	Height	Weight	Year	Hometown	Notes
Alex Anglin	11	G/F	6'5"	177	Senior	Kokomo, IN	Graduated
Zach Hahn	3	G	6'1"	176	Senior	New Castle, IN	Graduated
Matt Howard	54	F	6'8"	230	Senior	Connersville, IN	Graduated
Grant Leiendecker	22	G	6'5"	182	Senior	Fort Wayne, IN	Graduated
Shelvin Mack	1	G	6'3"	215	Junior	Lexington, KY	Entered 2011 NBA draft (selected by the Washington Wizards)
Shawn Vanzant	2	G	6'0"	172	Senior	Tampa, FL	Graduated

=== Preseason rankings ===
Publication	Rank
AP	RV
ESPN/USA Today Coaches' Poll	RV
Lindy's	24
College Sports Madness	28
Sporting News	43
ESPN The Magazine	47
CollegeInsider.com Mid Major	2

=== Preseason awards ===
#	Name	Class	Award
44	Andrew Smith	Jr.	Preseason All-Horizon 2nd Team

=== Preseason game capsules ===
11/2 – Butler vs Northern State

Team	1st Half	2nd Half	Final
NSU	25	28	53
BU	25	25	50

Butler Falls On Buzzer-Beater
Senior guard Alex Thomas nailed a three-point field goal at the buzzer to cap a 12–0 closing run and lift visiting Northern State to a 53–50 victory over Butler in an exhibition game at Hinkle Fieldhouse on Wednesday, Nov. 2. The game was Butler's first test against outside competition. The Wolves battled back from a 50–41 deficit in the final four minutes. A steal and layup by Seth Bachand and a conventional three-point play by Trent Zomer cut the margin to 50–46 with 2:56 left. Forward Collin Pryor followed with back-to-back baskets to tie the game at 50–50 with 0:52 left. Butler's Andrew Smith, who led all scorers with 19 points missed the front end of a one-and-one free throw situation with 0:38 left, setting up the final play. Following a timeout, Northern State held the ball for a final shot and Thomas delivered from the top of the key as the final buzzer sounded.

11/4 – Butler vs Franklin

Team	1st Half	2nd Half	Final
FRNK	25	28	53
BU	45	46	91

Butler Rolls Past Franklin In Exhibition Tilt
Junior Andrew Smith led four players in double-figures with 19 points in 17 minutes and Butler pulled away to a 91–53 victory over visiting Franklin in an exhibition game at Hinkle Fieldhouse on Saturday, Nov. 5. The game was Butler's final preseason test. Smith, who also led Butler with 19 points in a 53–50 loss to Northern State three days earlier, hit seven of nine shots in his brief stint, including one of two from beyond the three-point arc. The 6–11 center was perfect on four free throw attempts, and he added three assists. There was plenty of support for the Butler scoring leader. Junior Chase Stigall (below left) hit four of six shots from three-point range and finished with 14 points, while freshman Andrew Smeathers came off the bench and hit three of five three-pointers and finished with 11 points. Freshman guard Jackson Aldridge had 10 points in a reserve stint.

== Regular season ==
11/12 – Butler at Evansville

Team	1st Half	2nd Half	OT	Final
EVV	28	41	11	80
BU	37	32	8	77

Butler Falls In Overtime At Evansville
Junior Colt Ryan tied the game with a free throw in regulation and then scored his team's final six points in overtime to lift host Evansville to an 80–77 overtime victory over Butler in the season-opener for both teams at the new Ford Center on Saturday, Nov. 12. Between Ryan's clutch points, the game took a bizarre twist. Butler led 69–68 with Evansville in possession and 0:15 remaining. The Aces' Ned Cox missed a jump shot with 0:07 remaining and there was a loose ball scramble for the rebound. Butler's Jackson Aldridge was whistled for a foul with 0:00.9 left, sending Ryan to the line. The Evansville scoring leader missed the first free throw, but made the second to tie the game. Butler's Emerson Kampen then threw a full-court pass to center Andrew Smith, who caught the ball and laid it in at the buzzer for an apparent game-winning shot. The game officials huddled, and claimed a foul was called before the shot, sending Smith to the free throw line with 0:00.2 left. Smith missed both shots, forcing the overtime period.

11/15 – Butler vs Chattanooga

Team	1st Half	2nd Half	Final
CHAT	27	19	46
BU	28	29	57

Bulldogs Win Home-Opener
Junior Andrew Smith recorded his second career double-double and Butler used a staunch defensive effort to dispatch visiting Chattanooga, 57–46, in the Bulldogs' 2011–12 home-opener at Hinkle Fieldhouse on Tuesday, Nov. 15. The game was Butler's first in the five-team Hoosier Invitational. Smith (below), a 6–11 center, led both teams with 16 points, hitting five of eight shots from the field and five of seven from the free throw line. He also led both teams with 10 rebounds, one off his career-high. His performance followed a 21-point effort in Butler's tough season-opening double-overtime loss at Evansville. But it was Butler's defensive effort that claimed the spotlight. The Bulldogs limited Chattanooga (0–2), a team favored in the Southern Conference, to just 19 points in the second half. The Mocs scored just six points in the final 13 minutes of the contest.

11/19 – Butler vs #8/7 Louisville

Team	1st Half	2nd Half	Final
LOU	29	40	69
BU	28	25	53

Second Half Lifts No. 7 Louisville Past Butler
Seniors Kyle Kuric and Chris Smith combined for 32 points and sparked a late second half run that lifted No. 7 Louisville to a 69–53 victory over Butler at Hinkle Fieldhouse on Saturday, Nov. 19. The win boosted the Cardinals to 3–0 on the season, while Butler fell to 1–2. Butler held a 41–40 advantage with 12 minutes remaining, when Kuric and Smith ignited a decisive 16–4 run. Kuric scored 10 points in the six-minute run, while Smith added the other six to give the Cardinals a 56–45 advantage. Butler never got closer than nine points in the final six minutes.
