= 2011–12 Valparaiso Crusaders men's basketball team =

American college basketball season

2011–12 Valparaiso Crusaders men's basketball
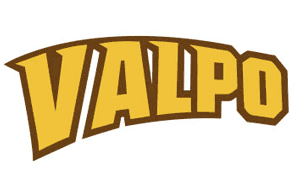

Horizon League Regular Season Champions

NIT, First Round
- Conference: Horizon League
- Record: 22–12 (14–4 Horizon)
- Head coach: Bryce Drew
- Assistant coaches: Roger Powell; Luke Gore; Jake Diebler
- Home arena: Athletics–Recreation Center

2011–12 Horizon League men's basketball standings
	Conf.				Overall
Team	W		L	PCT	W		L	PCT
Valparaiso	14	–	4	.778	22	–	11	.667
Cleveland State	12	–	6	.667	22	–	11	.667
Detroit †	11	–	7	.611	22	–	14	.611
Milwaukee	11	–	7	.611	20	–	13	.606
Butler	11	–	7	.611	22	–	14	.611
Youngstown State	10	–	8	.556	16	–	15	.516
Green Bay	10	–	8	.556	15	–	15	.500
Wright State	7	–	11	.389	13	–	19	.406
UIC	3	–	15	.167	8	–	22	.267
Loyola Chicago	1	–	17	.056	7	–	23	.233
† 2012 Horizon League Tournament winner As of March 6, 2012; Rankings from AP Poll

The 2011–12 Valparaiso Crusaders men's basketball team represented the Valparaiso University in the 2011–12 NCAA Division I men's basketball season. Their head coach was Bryce Drew. The Crusaders played their home games at the Athletics–Recreation Center and are members of the Horizon League. The Crusaders were Horizon League regular season champions but failed to win the Horizon League Basketball tournament. As regular season champions, they received an automatic bid into the 2012 NIT where they lost in the first round.

== Roster ==
2011–12 Valparaiso Crusaders men's basketball team
Players
Coaches

Pos.	#	Name	Height	Weight	Year	Hometown
F	0	Richie Edwards	6 ft 7 in (2.01 m)	220 lb (100 kg)	Jr	Lakeland, FL
G	2	Griffyn Carpenter	6 ft 1 in (1.85 m)	220 lb (100 kg)	Fr	Bourbon, IN
C	3	Hrvoje Vucic	7 ft 1 in (2.16 m)	245 lb (111 kg)	RS So	Glavice, HR
F	5	Bobby Capobianco (redshirt)	6 ft 9 in (2.06 m)	250 lb (113 kg)	Jr	Loveland, OH
G	11	Nick Shelton	5 ft 11 in (1.8 m)	170 lb (77 kg)	Sr	Frankenmuth, MI
G	12	Ben Boggs	6 ft 4 in (1.93 m)	195 lb (88 kg)	Jr	Roanoke, VA
F	14	Vashil Fernandez (redshirt)	6 ft 10 in (2.08 m)	220 lb (100 kg)	Fr	Kingston, JM
G	15	Erik Buggs	5 ft 11 in (1.8 m)	155 lb (70 kg)	RS Jr	Memphis, TN
G	20	Tommy Kurth	6 ft 1 in (1.85 m)	180 lb (82 kg)	RS So	Osceola, IN
G	21	Will Bogan	6 ft 1 in (1.85 m)	170 lb (77 kg)	Jr	Caldwell, ID
G	22	Jay Harris	6 ft 2 in (1.88 m)	155 lb (70 kg)	So	Aurora, IL
G	23	Matt Kenney	6 ft 4 in (1.93 m)	205 lb (93 kg)	Jr	Mooresville, IN
F	44	Nathan Stegelmann	6 ft 6 in (1.98 m)	225 lb (102 kg)	Sr	Goshen, IN
G/F	45	Ryan Broekhoff	6 ft 7 in (2.01 m)	215 lb (98 kg)	Jr	Frankston, VIC, AU
F	55	Kevin van Wijk	6 ft 8 in (2.03 m)	245 lb (111 kg)	Jr	Hoofddorp, NL

Head coach

- Bryce Drew (Valparaiso)

Assistant coach(es)

- Roger Powell, Jr. (Illinois)
- Luke Gore (Bethel (TN))
- Jake Diebler (Valparaiso)

Legend

- (C) Team captain
- (S) Suspended
- (I) Ineligible
- (W) Walk-on
- Injured
- Current redshirt

Roster
Last update: 2011-10-30

== Schedule ==
Date time, TV	Rank^{#}	Opponent^{#}	Result	Record	Site (attendance) city, state
Exhibition
Oct. 29*; 7:05 pm		Hillsdale	W 73–71	0–0	Athletics–Recreation Center (2,946); Valparaiso, IN
Nov. 3*; 7:05 pm		Augustana	W 74–65	0–0	Athletics–Recreation Center (2,488); Valparaiso, IN
Regular season
Nov. 7*; 8:00 pm, ESPNU		at No. 16 Arizona	L 64–73	0–1	McKale Center (12,871); Tucson, AZ
Nov. 11*; 6:30 pm		at Georgia Southern	W 90–81	1–1	Hanner Fieldhouse (2,547); Statesboro, GA
Nov. 14*; 7:05 pm, HLN		Holy Cross (IN)	W 88–38	2–1	Athletics–Recreation Center (1,957); Valparaiso, IN
Nov. 18*; 7:30 pm, HLN		Akron	W 62–59	3–1	Athletics–Recreation Center (3,876); Valparaiso, IN
Nov. 19*; 7:30 pm, HLN		IU-Kokomo	W 79–48	4–1	Athletics–Recreation Center (2,244); Valparaiso, IN
Nov. 20*; 3:30 pm, HLN		Duquesne	W 84–68	5–1	Athletics–Recreation Center (2,011); Valparaiso, IN
Nov. 25*; 5:30 pm, BTN		at No. 3 Ohio State	L 47–80	5–2	Value City Arena (15,606); Columbus, OH
Dec. 3; 1:00 pm, HLN/WNDY		at Butler	W 77–71 ^{OT}	6–2 (1–0)	Hinkle Fieldhouse (7,239); Indianapolis, IN
Dec. 7*; 6:00 pm		at IPFW	L 76–85	6–3	Memorial Coliseum (1,550); Fort Wayne, IN
Dec. 10*; 7:05 pm, HLN		Bowling Green	W 82–79	7–3	Athletics–Recreation Center (3,667); Valparaiso, IN
Dec. 17*; 7:05 pm, HLN		Oakland	L 80–82	7–4	Athletics–Recreation Center (2,884); Valparaiso, IN
Dec. 20*; 7:00 pm		at Northern Illinois	W 59–48	8–4	Convocation Center (850); DeKalb, IL
Dec. 23*; 12:00 pm		at IUPUI	L 88–97	8–5	Conseco Fieldhouse (1,576); Indianapolis, IN
Dec. 29; 7:05 pm, HLN		Milwaukee	L 55–57	8–6 (1–1)	Athletics–Recreation Center (2,644); Valparaiso, IN
Dec. 31; 4:05 pm, HLN		Green Bay	W 90–87	9–6 (2–1)	Athletics–Recreation Center (2,353); Valparaiso, IN
Jan. 6; 8:00 pm, ESPN3		at Detroit	W 73–71	10–6 (3–1)	Calihan Hall (2,271); Detroit, MI
Jan. 8; 2:00 pm, ESPN3		at Wright State	L 55–73	10–7 (3–2)	Nutter Center (3,736); Dayton, OH
Jan. 13; 7:05 pm, HLN		Youngstown State	W 76–62	11–7 (4–2)	Athletics–Recreation Center (3,271); Valparaiso, IN
Jan. 15; 1:35 pm, HLN		Cleveland State	W 72–66	12–7 (5–2)	Athletics–Recreation Center (4,124); Valparaiso, IN
Jan. 19; 7:00 pm, HLN		at Loyola	W 69–48	13–7 (6–2)	Gentile Center (2,555); Chicago, IL
Jan. 21; 3:00 pm, HLN		at UIC	W 60–55	14–7 (7–2)	UIC Pavilion (3,367); Chicago, IL
Jan. 26; 7:00 pm, HLN		at Green Bay	L 60–75	14–8 (7–3)	Resch Center (2,546); Green Bay, WI
Jan. 28; 1:00 pm, HLN		at Milwaukee	W 55–52	15–8 (8–3)	U.S. Cellular Arena (5,773); Milwaukee, WI
Feb. 2; 7:05 pm, ESPN3		Detroit	W 78–73	16–8 (9–3)	Athletics–Recreation Center (3,488); Valparaiso, IN
Feb. 4; 7:05 pm, HLN		Wright State	W 63–54	17–8 (10–3)	Athletics–Recreation Center (4,727); Valparaiso, IN
Feb. 9; 6:00 pm, HLN		at Cleveland State	W 59–41	18–8 (11–3)	Wolstein Center (4,521); Cleveland, OH
Feb. 11; 6:00 pm, HLN		at Youngstown State	L 53–71	18–9 (11–4)	Beeghly Center (3,374); Youngstown, OH
Feb. 14; 7:05 pm, HLN		UIC	W 74–65	19–9 (12–4)	Athletics–Recreation Center (2,714); Valparaiso, IN
Feb. 18*; 8:00 pm, ESPNU		at Loyola Marymount	L 53–61	19–10	Gersten Pavilion (4,021); Los Angeles, CA
Feb. 21; 7:05 pm, HLN		Loyola	W 66–62 ^{OT}	20–10 (13–4)	Athletics–Recreation Center (3,337); Valparaiso, IN
Feb. 24; 6:00 pm, ESPNU		Butler	W 71–59	21–10 (14–4)	Athletics–Recreation Center (5,237); Valparaiso, IN
Horizon League tournament
Mar. 3; 8:30 pm, ESPNU/ESPN3		Butler; Semifinal	W 65–46	22–10	Athletics-Recreation Center (4,716); Valparaiso, IN
Mar. 6; 9:00 pm, ESPN/ESPN3		Detroit; Championship Game	L 50–68	22–11	Athletics-Recreation Center (4,258); Valparaiso, IN
2012 NIT
Mar. 14; 7:30 pm, ESPNU		at Miami (FL); First Round	L 50–66	22–12	BankUnited Center (1,229); Coral Gables, FL
*Non-conference game. ^{#}Rankings from Coaches' Poll. (#) Tournament seedings in parentheses. All times are in Eastern Time..
