= 2011–12 Green Bay Phoenix men's basketball team =

American college basketball season

2011–12 Green Bay Phoenix men's basketball
- Conference: Horizon League
- Record: 15–14 (10–8 Horizon)
- Head coach: Brian Wardle
- Assistant coaches: Brian Barone; Jimmie Foster; Chrys Cornelius
- Home arena: Resch Center

2011–12 Horizon League men's basketball standings
	Conf.				Overall
Team	W		L	PCT	W		L	PCT
Valparaiso	14	–	4	.778	22	–	11	.667
Cleveland State	12	–	6	.667	22	–	11	.667
Detroit †	11	–	7	.611	22	–	14	.611
Milwaukee	11	–	7	.611	20	–	13	.606
Butler	11	–	7	.611	22	–	14	.611
Youngstown State	10	–	8	.556	16	–	15	.516
Green Bay	10	–	8	.556	15	–	15	.500
Wright State	7	–	11	.389	13	–	19	.406
UIC	3	–	15	.167	8	–	22	.267
Loyola Chicago	1	–	17	.056	7	–	23	.233
† 2012 Horizon League Tournament winner As of March 6, 2012; Rankings from AP Poll

The 2011–12 Green Bay Phoenix men's basketball team represented University of Wisconsin–Green Bay in the 2011–12 NCAA Division I men's basketball season. Their head coach was Brian Wardle. The Phoenix played their home games at the Resch Center and were members of the Horizon League. They were eliminated in the first round of the Horizon League tournament by Youngstown State.

== Roster ==
2011–12 Green Bay Phoenix men's basketball team
Players
Coaches

Pos.	#	Name	Height	Weight	Year	Hometown
G	2	Terry Johnson	6 ft 0 in (1.83 m)	180 lb (82 kg)	RS So	Chicago, IL
G	3	Aaron Armstead	6 ft 4 in (1.93 m)	181 lb (82 kg)	Fr	Chicago, IL
G	4	Steve Baker	6 ft 2 in (1.88 m)	190 lb (86 kg)	Sr	St. Paul, MN
G	5	Eric Valentin	5 ft 4 in (1.63 m)	143 lb (65 kg)	Sr	Oviedo, FL
G	10	Josh Humphrey	6 ft 5 in (1.96 m)	193 lb (88 kg)	Fr	Chicago, IL
F	11	Jarvis Williams	6 ft 6 in (1.98 m)	190 lb (86 kg)	Sr	Milwaukee, WI
G	13	Kam Cerroni	6 ft 2 in (1.88 m)	190 lb (86 kg)	So	Sussex, WI
F	15	Greg Mays	6 ft 9 in (2.06 m)	220 lb (100 kg)	Fr	Chicago, IL
C	21	Alec Brown	7 ft 0.25 in (2.14 m)	215 lb (98 kg)	So	Winona, MN
F	22	Daniel Turner	6 ft 6 in (1.98 m)	210 lb (95 kg)	So	McCordsville, IN
G	24	Keifer Sykes	5 ft 10 in (1.78 m)	161 lb (73 kg)	Fr	Chicago, IL
G	32	Jared Dimakos	6 ft 4 in (1.93 m)	188 lb (85 kg)	Fr	Schaumburg, IL
C	44	Brennan Cougill	6 ft 9 in (2.06 m)	265 lb (120 kg)	Jr	Sioux City, IA
F	55	Clayton Heuer	6 ft 9 in (2.06 m)	225 lb (102 kg)	So	Wisconsin Rapids, WI

Head coach

- Brian Wardle (Marquette)

Assistant coach(es)

- Brian Barone (Marquette)
- Jimmie Foster (South Dakota)
- Chrys Cornelius (Western Illinois)

Legend

- (C) Team captain
- (S) Suspended
- (I) Ineligible
- (W) Walk-on
- Injured
- Current redshirt

Roster
Last update: 2011-10-20

== Schedule ==
Date time, TV	Rank^{#}	Opponent^{#}	Result	Record	Site (attendance) city, state
Exhibition
November 4, 2011*; 7:00 pm		Lawrence	W 87–56	—	Kress Events Center (1,523); Green Bay, WI
Regular season
November 11, 2011*; 7:00 pm		Mary	W 94–55	1–0	Resch Center (2,058); Green Bay, WI
November 13, 2011*; 1:00 pm		at Duquesne	L 66–84	1–1	A. J. Palumbo Center (2,334); Pittsburgh, PA
November 16, 2011*; 7:00 pm		at North Dakota State	L 61–65	1–2	Bison Sports Arena (2,450); Fargo, ND
November 19, 2011*; 7:00 pm		Wyoming	W 52–44	2–2	Resch Center (2,740); Green Bay, WI
November 21, 2011*; 6:05 pm		at Indiana State	L 56–57	2–3	Hulman Center (4,761); Terre Haute, IN
November 25, 2011*; 6:00 pm, ESPN3		at Virginia	L 42–68	2–4	John Paul Jones Arena (9,113); Charlottesville, VA
December 1, 2011; 7:00 pm		UIC	W 71–68	3–4 (1–0)	Resch Center (2,067); Green Bay, WI
December 3, 2011; 7:00 pm		Loyola	W 57–47	4–4 (2–0)	Resch Center (3,047); Green Bay, WI
December 7, 2011*; 7:00 pm, ESPN3		at No. 14 Wisconsin	L 42–70	4–5	Kohl Center (17,076); Madison, WI
December 10, 2011*; 1:00 pm		at No. 11 Marquette	L 61–79	4–6	Bradley Center (14,208); Milwaukee, WI
December 13, 2011*; 7:00 pm		Michigan Tech	W 69–61	5–6	Resch Center (2,121); Green Bay, WI
December 22, 2011*; 7:00 pm		Idaho	W 63–61	6–6	Resch Center (2,514); Green Bay, WI
December 29, 2011; 6:00 pm, WNDY/ESPN3		at Butler	L 49–53	6–7 (2–1)	Hinkle Fieldhouse (7,550); Indianapolis, IN
December 31, 2011; 4:05 pm		at Valparaiso	L 87–90	6–8 (2–2)	Athletics–Recreation Center (2,353); Valparaiso, IN
January 7, 2012; 7:00 pm		at Milwaukee	L 63–64	6–9 (2–3)	U.S. Cellular Arena (4,437); Milwaukee, WI
January 12, 2012; 8:00 pm		Detroit	L 73–80	6–10 (2–4)	Resch Center (2,142); Green Bay, WI
January 14, 2012; 1:00 pm		Wright State	W 57–56	7–10 (3–4)	Resch Center (3,449); Green Bay, WI
January 20, 2012; 8:00, ESPNU		at Cleveland State	L 68–78	7–11 (3–5)	Wolstein Center (2,941); Cleveland, OH
January 22, 2012; 1:05 pm		at Youngstown State	L 47–77	7–12 (3–6)	Beeghly Center (1,590); Youngstown, OH
January 26, 2012; 7:00 pm		Valparaiso	W 75–60	8–12 (4–6)	Resch Center (2,546); Green Bay, WI
January 28, 2012; 6:00 pm		Butler	W 80–68	9–12 (5–6)	Resch Center (5,820); Green Bay, WI
February 4, 2012; 1:00 pm		Milwaukee	L 75–81	9–13 (5–7)	Resch Center (5,124); Green Bay, WI
February 10, 2012; 8:00 pm		at Wright State	W 53–48	10–13 (6–7)	Ervin J. Nutter Center (4,557); Dayton, OH
February 12, 2012; 12:00 pm		at Detroit	L 74–77	10–14 (6–8)	Calihan Hall (1,923); Detroit, MI
February 14, 2012; 7:00 pm		Youngstown State	W 71–65	11–14 (7–8)	Resch Center (2,910); Green Bay, WI
February 18, 2012*; 1:00 pm		Eastern Michigan; ESPN BracketBusters	W 54–49	12–14	Resch Center (3,539); Green Bay, WI
February 21, 2012; 7:00 pm		Cleveland State	W 71–67	13–14 (8–8)	Resch Center (2,819); Green Bay, WI
February 23, 2012; 7:00 pm, HLN		at Loyola	W 73–70 ^{OT}	14–14 (9–8)	Joseph J. Gentile Center (1,665); Chicago, IL
February 25, 2012; 1:00 pm		at UIC	W 71–63	15–14 (10–8)	UIC Pavilion (3,813); Chicago, IL
Horizon League tournament
February 28, 2012; 7:05 pm, HLN	(7)	at (6) Youngstown State; First Round	L 60–77	15–15	Beeghly Center (3,114); Youngstown, OH
*Non-conference game. ^{#}Rankings from AP Poll. (#) Tournament seedings in parentheses. All times are in Eastern Time..
