= 2012 Horizon League men's basketball tournament =

- Classification: Division I
- Season: 2011–12
- Teams: 10
- First round site: campus sites
- Semifinals site: Athletics-Recreation Center; Valparaiso, Indiana
- Finals site: Athletics-Recreation Center; Valparaiso, Indiana
- Champions: Detroit (3rd title)
- Winning coach: Ray McCallum (1st title)
- MVP: Ray McCallum, Jr. (Detroit)
- Television: ESPN, ESPNU, ESPN3 and Horizon League Network

2011–12 Horizon League men's basketball standings
	Conf.				Overall
Team	W		L	PCT	W		L	PCT
Valparaiso	14	–	4	.778	22	–	11	.667
Cleveland State	12	–	6	.667	22	–	11	.667
Detroit †	11	–	7	.611	22	–	14	.611
Milwaukee	11	–	7	.611	20	–	13	.606
Butler	11	–	7	.611	22	–	14	.611
Youngstown State	10	–	8	.556	16	–	15	.516
Green Bay	10	–	8	.556	15	–	15	.500
Wright State	7	–	11	.389	13	–	19	.406
UIC	3	–	15	.167	8	–	22	.267
Loyola Chicago	1	–	17	.056	7	–	23	.233
† 2012 Horizon League Tournament winner As of March 6, 2012; Rankings from AP Poll

The 2012 Horizon League Men's Basketball Tournament began on February 28 and ended on March 6. The Horizon League Network broadcast the first and second rounds. The semifinals were televised by ESPNU, with the championship game on ESPN. The Detroit Titans won the tournament and an automatic bid to the 2012 NCAA tournament.

Each first-round game was played on the home court of the higher-seeded team. The second round and semifinals were held at the Athletics-Recreation Center in Valparaiso, Indiana, home to the #1 overall seed Valparaiso. Since Valparaiso advanced to the championship game, the Crusaders also hosted the final.

== Seeds ==
All Horizon League schools play in the tournament. Teams are seeded by 2011–12 Horizon League season record, with a tiebreaker system to seed teams with identical conference records. The top 2 teams receive a bye to the semifinals.

== Schedule ==
Game	Time*	Matchup^{#}	Television
First Round – Tuesday, February 28
1	7:00 PM	#10 Loyola at #3 Detroit	HLN
2	7:05 PM	#7 Green Bay at #6 Youngstown State	HLN
3	8:00 PM	#9 UIC at #4 Milwaukee	HLN
4	7:00 PM	#8 Wright State at #5 Butler	HLN
Second Round – Friday, March 2
5	6:00 PM	#3 Detroit vs. #6 Youngstown State	HLN
6	8:30 PM	#4 Milwaukee vs. #5 Butler	HLN
Semifinals – Saturday, March 3
7	6:00 PM	#3 Detroit vs #2 Cleveland State	ESPNU
8	8:30 PM	#5 Butler at #1 Valparaiso	ESPNU
Championship Game – Tuesday, March 6
9	9:00 PM	Detroit vs Valparaiso	ESPN/ESPN3
*Game Times in ET. #-Rankings denote tournament seeding.

== Bracket ==
First round Tuesday, February 28, 2012; HLN
4	Milwaukee	68
9	UIC	55
5	Butler	70
8	Wright State	52
3	Detroit	80
10	Loyola Chicago	71
6	Youngstown State	77
7	Green Bay	60

Second round Friday, March 2, 2012; HLN
4	Milwaukee	49
5	Butler	71
3	Detroit	93
6	Youngstown State	76

Semifinals; Saturday, March 3, 2012; ESPNU
1	Valparaiso	65
5	Butler	46
2	Cleveland State	58
3	Detroit	63

Championship Game; Tuesday, March 6, 2012; ESPN
1	Valparaiso	50
3	Detroit	70

First round games at campus sites of lower-numbered seeds
Second round and semifinals hosted by Valparaiso
Championship game hosted by highest remaining seed

== Honors ==
=== Tournament MVP ===
Ray McCallum, Jr. of Detroit was named the tournament MVP.

=== Horizon League All-Tournament Team ===
Player	School	Position	Year
Ray McCallum, Jr.	Detroit	Guard	Sophomore
Jason Calliste	Detroit	Guard	JR
LaMarcus Lowe	Detroit	Forward/Center	SR
Ryan Broekhoff	Valparaiso	Guard/Forward	JR
Kevin Van Wijk	Valparaiso	Forward	JR
