= 2011–12 Cleveland State Vikings men's basketball team =

American college basketball season

2011–12 Cleveland State Vikings men's basketball

NIT, First Round
- Conference: Horizon League
- Record: 22–11 (12–6 Horizon)
- Head coach: Gary Waters
- Assistant coaches: Jayson Gee; Larry DeSimpilare; Jermaine Kimbough
- Home arena: Wolstein Center

2011–12 Horizon League men's basketball standings
	Conf.				Overall
Team	W		L	PCT	W		L	PCT
Valparaiso	14	–	4	.778	22	–	11	.667
Cleveland State	12	–	6	.667	22	–	11	.667
Detroit †	11	–	7	.611	22	–	14	.611
Milwaukee	11	–	7	.611	20	–	13	.606
Butler	11	–	7	.611	22	–	14	.611
Youngstown State	10	–	8	.556	16	–	15	.516
Green Bay	10	–	8	.556	15	–	15	.500
Wright State	7	–	11	.389	13	–	19	.406
UIC	3	–	15	.167	8	–	22	.267
Loyola Chicago	1	–	17	.056	7	–	23	.233
† 2012 Horizon League Tournament winner As of March 6, 2012; Rankings from AP Poll

The 2011–12 Cleveland State Vikings men's basketball team represented Cleveland State University in the 2011–12 NCAA Division I men's basketball season. Their head coach was Gary Waters. The Vikings played their home games at the Wolstein Center and were members of the Horizon League. It was the 81st season of Cleveland State basketball.

== Previous season ==
Last year's team finished the season 27–9, 13–5 in Horizon League play to share the regular season conference title with Butler and Milwaukee. They played in the NIT, advancing to the second round.

== Preseason ==
The preseason Horizon League Coaches' Poll picked the Vikings to finish third with two first place votes behind Butler and Detroit, with 28 and 19 first place votes, respectively.

== Regular season ==
In the preseason rankings Cleveland State received no points or votes in the AP or ESPN/USA Today coaches poll. On November 7, 2011 Cleveland State received 43 points in the AP poll for 29th overall and 13 votes in the coaches poll for a ranking of 35th. On November 14, 2011 Cleveland State received 94 points in the AP poll for a ranking of 26th. In the coaches poll Cleveland State received 20 points for a ranking of 34th.

== Roster ==
2011–12 Cleveland State Vikings men's basketball team
Players
Coaches

Pos.	#	Name	Height	Weight	Year	Hometown
G	1	Sebastian Douglas	6 ft 4 in (1.93 m)	200 lb (91 kg)	RS Fr	Houston, TX
G	3	Trevon Harmon	6 ft 1 in (1.85 m)	185 lb (84 kg)	Sr	Pasadena, CA
F	4	Devon Long	6 ft 7 in (2.01 m)	260 lb (118 kg)	So	Highland Park, MI
G	5	Jeremy Montgomery	6 ft 2 in (1.88 m)	195 lb (88 kg)	Sr	Chicago, IL
F	15	Anton Grady	6 ft 8 in (2.03 m)	215 lb (98 kg)	Fr	Cleveland, OH
F	21	Marlin Mason	6 ft 6 in (1.98 m)	210 lb (95 kg)	Fr	Detroit, MI
F	24	Ludovic Ndaye	6 ft 9 in (2.06 m)	230 lb (104 kg)	So	Montreal, QC, CA
G	31	Charles Lee	5 ft 9 in (1.75 m)	160 lb (73 kg)	Fr	Milwaukee, WI
G	32	D'Aundray Brown	6 ft 4 in (1.93 m)	195 lb (88 kg)	RS Sr	Youngstown, OH
F	33	Tim Kamczyc	6 ft 7 in (2.01 m)	220 lb (100 kg)	RS Jr	Strongsville, OH
G	34	Ike Nwamu	6 ft 4 in (1.93 m)	205 lb (93 kg)	Fr	Greensboro, NC
F	44	Aaron Pogue	6 ft 9 in (2.06 m)	270 lb (122 kg)	RS Sr	Dayton, OH

Head coach

- Gary Waters (Ferris State)

Assistant coach(es)

- Jayson Gee (College of Charleston)
- Larry DeSimpelare (Spring Arbor)
- Jermaine Kimbrough (Virginia Tech)

Legend

- (C) Team captain
- (S) Suspended
- (I) Ineligible
- (W) Walk-on
- Injured
- Current redshirt

Roster
Last update: 2011-11-1

== Schedule ==
Date time, TV	Rank^{#}	Opponent^{#}	Result	Record	Site (attendance) city, state
Exhibition
Nov. 9*; 7:00 pm		John Carroll	W 88–58	–	Wolstein Center (1,583); Cleveland, OH
Regular season
Nov. 13*; 2:00 pm, ESPNU		at No. 7 Vanderbilt	W 71–58	1–0	Memorial Gymnasium (13,503); Nashville, TN
Nov. 15*; 7:00 pm		Rio Grande	W 86–57	2–0	Wolstein Center (1,871); Cleveland, OH
Nov. 18*; 7:00 pm, HLN		St. Bonaventure	W 67–64	3–0	Wolstein Center (3,073); Cleveland, OH
Nov. 22*; 7:30 pm		at Kent State	W 57–53	4–0	M.A.C. Center (6,327); Kent, OH
Nov. 25*; 2:30 pm		vs. Boston University	W 63–62	5–0	Ryan Center (–); Kingston, RI
Nov. 26*; 2:30 pm		vs. Hofstra	W 63–53	5–1	Ryan Center (–); Kingston, RI
Nov. 27*; 2:30 pm		at Rhode Island	W 67–45	6–1	Ryan Center (2,737); Kingston, RI
Dec. 1; 7:00 pm, HLN		at Wright State	W 45–43	7–1 (1–0)	Nutter Center (3,349); Dayton, OH
Dec. 3; 2:00 pm, HLN		at Detroit	W 66–61	8–1 (2–0)	Calihan Hall (1,880); Detroit, MI
Dec. 8*; 7:00 pm		at Robert Morris	W 62–58	9–1	Sewall Center (1,378); Moon Township, PA
Dec. 10*; 2:00 pm, HLN		Akron	W 69–66	10–1	Wolstein Center (4,739); Cleveland, OH
Dec. 19*; 7:00 pm		at South Florida	W 70–55	10–2	St. Pete Times Forum (2,942); Tampa, FL
Dec. 22*; 7:00 pm, HLN		Sam Houston State	W 63–45	11–2	Wolstein Center (2,683); Cleveland, OH
Dec. 28*; 7:00 pm		at Toledo	W 72–64	12–2	Savage Arena (4,032); Toledo, OH
Dec. 31; 2:00 pm, HLN		Youngstown State	L 67–73	12–3 (2–1)	Wolstein Center (3,513); Cleveland, OH
Jan. 5; 7:00 pm, HLN		UIC	W 73–56	13–3 (3–1)	Wolstein Center (2,137); Cleveland, OH
Jan. 7; 2:00 pm, HLN		Loyola (IL)	W 69–48	14–3 (4–1)	Wolstein Center (3,107); Cleveland, OH
Jan. 13; 7:05 pm, ESPNU		at Butler	W 76–69	15–3 (5–1)	Hinkle Fieldhouse (7,994); Indianapolis, IN
Jan. 15; 2:35 pm, HLN		at Valparaiso	L 66–72	15–4 (5–2)	Athletics–Recreation Center (4,124); Valparaiso, IN
Jan. 20; 8:00 pm, ESPNU		Green Bay	W 78–68	16–4 (6–2)	Wolstein Center (2,941); Cleveland, OH
Jan. 22; 2:00 pm, HLN		Milwaukee	W 83–57	17–4 (7–2)	Wolstein Center (3,235); Cleveland, OH
Jan. 28; 7:05 pm, HLN		at Youngstown State	W 67–47	18–4 (8–2)	Beeghly Center (6,313); Youngstown, OH
Feb. 3; 9:00 pm, ESPNU		at Loyola (IL)	W 65–47	19–4 (9–2)	Gentile Center (2,443); Chicago, IL
Feb. 5; 2:00 pm, HLN		at UIC	W 70–42	20–4 (10–2)	UIC Pavilion (1,923); Chicago, IL
Feb. 9; 7:00 pm, HLN		Valparaiso	L 41–59	20–5 (10–3)	Wolstein Center (4,521); Cleveland, OH
Feb. 11; 11:00 am, ESPN2		Butler	L 49–52	20–6 (10–4)	Wolstein Center (5,021); Cleveland, OH
Feb. 14; 8:00 pm, HLN		at Milwaukee	L 84–86	20–7 (10–5)	US Cellular Arena (3,643); Milwaukee, WI
Feb. 18*; 11:00 am, ESPNU		Drexel; ESPN BracketBusters	L 49–69	20–8	Wolstein Center (2,583); Cleveland, OH
Feb. 21; 8:00 pm, HLN		at Green Bay	L 67–71	20–9 (10–6)	Resch Center (2,819); Green Bay, WI
Feb. 23; 7:00 pm, HLN		Detroit	W 77–64	21–9 (11–6)	Wolstein Center (2,325); Cleveland, OH
Feb. 25; 2:00 pm, HLN		Wright State	W 77–55	22–9 (12–6)	Wolstein Center (3,891); Cleveland, OH
Horizon League tournament
Mar. 3; 6:00 pm, ESPNU/ESPN3		vs. Detroit; Semifinal	L 58–63	22–10	Athletics-Recreation Center (–); Valparaiso, IN
NIT
Mar. 13; 11:00 pm, ESPN2		at Stanford; First Round	L 65–76	22–11	Maples Pavilion (–); Stanford, CA
*Non-conference game. ^{#}Rankings from Coaches' Poll. (#) Tournament seedings in parentheses. All times are in Eastern Time..

== Rankings ==
Ranking movement Legend: ██ Improvement in ranking. ██ Decrease in ranking. ██ Not ranked the previous week. RV=Others receiving votes.
Poll	Pre	Wk 1	Wk 2	Wk 3	Wk 4	Wk 5	Wk 6	Wk 7	Wk 8	Wk 9	Wk 10	Wk 11	Wk 12	Wk 13	Wk 14	Wk 15	Wk 16	Wk 17	Wk 18	Final
AP	NR	RV	RV	RV	RV	RV	RV	NR	NR	NR	NR	NR	NR	RV	NR	NR	NR	NR	NR	
Coaches	NR	RV	RV	RV	RV	NR	NR	RV	NR	NR	NR	NR	NR	RV	NR	NR	NR	NR	NR	
Mid-Major	22	4	3	5	5	4	4	5	8	8	10	10	10	10	15	RV	RV	RV	–	
