= 2011–12 Loyola Ramblers men's basketball team =

American college basketball season

2011–12 Loyola Ramblers men's basketball
- Conference: Horizon League
- Record: 7–23 (1–17 Horizon)
- Head coach: Porter Moser (1st season)
- Assistant coaches: Rodell Davis (1st season); Armon Gates (1st season); Jason Gardner (1st season)
- Home arena: Joseph J. Gentile Arena

2011–12 Horizon League men's basketball standings
	Conf.				Overall
Team	W		L	PCT	W		L	PCT
Valparaiso	14	–	4	.778	22	–	11	.667
Cleveland State	12	–	6	.667	22	–	11	.667
Detroit †	11	–	7	.611	22	–	14	.611
Milwaukee	11	–	7	.611	20	–	13	.606
Butler	11	–	7	.611	22	–	14	.611
Youngstown State	10	–	8	.556	16	–	15	.516
Green Bay	10	–	8	.556	15	–	15	.500
Wright State	7	–	11	.389	13	–	19	.406
UIC	3	–	15	.167	8	–	22	.267
Loyola Chicago	1	–	17	.056	7	–	23	.233
† 2012 Horizon League Tournament winner As of March 6, 2012; Rankings from AP Poll

The 2011–12 Loyola Ramblers men's basketball team represented Loyola University Chicago in the 2011–12 NCAA Division I men's basketball season. Their head coach was Porter Moser. The Ramblers played their home games at the Joseph J. Gentile Arena and are members of the Horizon League. They lost in the first round of the Horizon League tournament to Detroit.

== Roster ==
2011–12 Loyola Ramblers men's basketball team
Players
Coaches

Pos.	#	Name	Height	Weight	Year	Hometown
G	0	Denzel Brito	6 ft 2 in (1.88 m)	180 lb (82 kg)	So	Wareham, MA
G	1	Cully Payne (redshirt)	6 ft 1 in (1.85 m)	180 lb (82 kg)	Jr	Schaumburg, IL
G/F	2	Jordan Hicks	6 ft 6 in (1.98 m)	210 lb (95 kg)	Sr	Rochester, MN
G	5	Joe Crisman	6 ft 4 in (1.93 m)	195 lb (88 kg)	Fr	Munster, IN
G	10	Courtney Stanley (injured)	6 ft 1 in (1.85 m)	173 lb (78 kg)	Sr	Philadelphia, PA
F	12	Devin Hill (redshirt)	6 ft 9 in (2.06 m)	230 lb (104 kg)	Sr	Stamford, CT
G	13	London Dokubo	6 ft 0 in (1.83 m)	165 lb (75 kg)	Fr	Schaumburg, IL
G	14	Chim Kadima	6 ft 4 in (1.93 m)	190 lb (86 kg)	So	Milwaukee, WI
F	24	Ben Averkamp	6 ft 8 in (2.03 m)	235 lb (107 kg)	Jr	Germantown, WI
G/F	32	Christian Thomas	6 ft 5 in (1.96 m)	207 lb (94 kg)	Fr	St. Louis, MO
F	33	Walt Gibler	6 ft 7 in (2.01 m)	230 lb (104 kg)	Sr	Cincinnati, OH
F	34	Jonathon Gac	6 ft 9 in (2.06 m)	220 lb (100 kg)	So	Chicago, IL
C	44	John Benkoske	6 ft 9 in (2.06 m)	237 lb (108 kg)	Sr	Oshkosh, WI
G	45	Bill Clark	6 ft 4 in (1.93 m)	207 lb (94 kg)	So	Valparaiso, IN
F	52	Adam Cooper	6 ft 7 in (2.01 m)	207 lb (94 kg)	Sr	Ross, CA

Head coach

- Porter Moser (Creighton)

Assistant coach(es)

- Rodell Davis (Iowa)
- Armon Gates (Kent State)
- Jason Gardner (Arizona)

Legend

- (C) Team captain
- (S) Suspended
- (I) Ineligible
- (W) Walk-on
- Injured
- Current redshirt

Roster
Last update: 2011-10-27

== Schedule ==
Date time, TV	Opponent	Result	Record	Site city, state
Exhibition
Nov. 5*; 6:00 pm	Benedictine	W 73–57	–	Joseph J. Gentile Arena; Chicago, IL
Regular season
Nov. 11*; 8:00 pm	at Illinois	L 49–67	0–1	Assembly Hall; Champaign, IL
Nov. 14*; 7:00 pm	at Kansas State	L 61–74	0–2	Bramlage Coliseum; Manhattan, KS
Nov. 16*; 7:00 pm	at Eastern Illinois	L 61–65	0–3	Lantz Arena; Charleston, IL
Nov. 20*; 1:00 pm	at Furman	L 51–63	0–4	Timmons Arena; Greenville, SC
Nov. 26*; 3:00 pm	Fordham	W 64–50	1–4	Joseph J. Gentile Arena; Chicago, IL
Dec. 1; 7:00 pm	at Milwaukee	W 59–41	1–5 (0–1)	U.S. Cellular Arena; Milwaukee, WI
Dec. 3; 7:00 pm	at Green Bay	L 47–57	1–6 (0–2)	Resch Center; Green Bay, WI
Dec. 7*; 7:00 pm	DePaul	L 58–69	1–7	Joseph J. Gentile Arena; Chicago, IL
Dec. 10*; 2:00 pm	at Toledo	W 57–55	2–7	Savage Arena; Toledo, OH
Dec. 17*; 3:00 pm	Chicago State	W 64–49	3–7	Joseph J. Gentile Arena; Chicago, IL
Dec. 19*; 7:00 pm	Rockhurst	W 69–46	4–7	Joseph J. Gentile Arena; Chicago, IL
Dec. 22*; 6:30 pm	at Canisius	W 59–45	5–7	Koessler Athletic Center; Buffalo, NY
Dec. 29; 7:00 pm	Wright State	L 48–64	5–8 (0–3)	Joseph J. Gentile Arena; Chicago, IL
Dec. 31; 1:00 pm	Detroit	L 54–65	5–9 (0–4)	Joseph J. Gentile Arena; Chicago, IL
Jan. 5; 6:05 pm	at Youngstown State	L 64–68 ^{OT}	5–10 (0–5)	Beeghly Center; Youngstown, OH
Jan. 7; 1:00 pm	at Cleveland State	L 48–69	5–11 (0–6)	Wolstein Center; Cleveland, OH
Jan. 14; 3:00 pm	at UIC	L 51–58	5–12 (0–7)	UIC Pavilion; Chicago, IL
Jan. 19; 7:00 pm	Valparaiso	L 48–69	5–13 (0–8)	Joseph J. Gentile Arena; Chicago, IL
Jan. 21; 1:00 pm	Butler	L 57–63	5–14 (0–9)	Joseph J. Gentile Arena; Chicago, IL
Jan. 25; 6:00 pm	at Detroit	L 52–67	5–15 (0–10)	Calihan Hall; Detroit, MI
Jan. 27; 6:00 pm	at Wright State	L 41–47	5–16 (0–11)	Nutter Center; Dayton, OH
Feb. 3; 8:00 pm	Cleveland State	L 47–65	5–17 (0–12)	Joseph J. Gentile Arena; Chicago, IL
Feb. 5; 1:00 pm	Youngstown State	L 63–80	5–18 (0–13)	Joseph J. Gentile Arena; Chicago, IL
Feb. 11; 1:00 pm	UIC	W 78–69	6–18 (1–13)	Joseph J. Gentile Arena; Chicago, IL
Feb. 14; 6:00 pm	at Butler	L 57–63	6–19 (1–14)	Hinkle Fieldhouse; Indianapolis, IN
Feb. 18*; 7:00 pm	at Bradley; Bracket Busters	W 56–44	7–19	Carver Arena; Peoria, IL
Feb. 21; 7:05 pm	at Valparaiso	L 62-66 ^{OT}	7–20 (1–15)	Athletics–Recreation Center; Valparaiso, IN
Feb. 23; 7:00 pm	Green Bay	L 70–73 ^{OT}	7–21 (1–16)	Joseph J. Gentile Arena; Chicago, IL
Feb. 25; 3:00 pm	Milwaukee	L 69–78	7–22 (1–17)	Joseph J. Gentile Arena; Chicago, IL
Horizon League tournament
Feb. 28; 6:00 pm, HLN	at Detroit; First Round	L 71–80	7–23	Calihan Hall; Detroit, MI
*Non-conference game. ^{#}Rankings from Coaches' Poll. (#) Tournament seedings in parentheses. All times are in Central Time. HLN = Horizon League Network. BTN = Big Ten Network.
