= 2011–12 Youngstown State Penguins men's basketball team =

American college basketball season

2011–12 Youngstown State Penguins men's basketball
- Conference: Horizon League
- Record: 15–13 (10–7 Horizon)
- Head coach: Jerry Slocum
- Assistant coaches: Michael Wernicki; Brian DePaoli; Byron Thorne
- Home arena: Beeghly Center

2011–12 Horizon League men's basketball standings
	Conf.				Overall
Team	W		L	PCT	W		L	PCT
Valparaiso	14	–	4	.778	22	–	11	.667
Cleveland State	12	–	6	.667	22	–	11	.667
Detroit †	11	–	7	.611	22	–	14	.611
Milwaukee	11	–	7	.611	20	–	13	.606
Butler	11	–	7	.611	22	–	14	.611
Youngstown State	10	–	8	.556	16	–	15	.516
Green Bay	10	–	8	.556	15	–	15	.500
Wright State	7	–	11	.389	13	–	19	.406
UIC	3	–	15	.167	8	–	22	.267
Loyola Chicago	1	–	17	.056	7	–	23	.233
† 2012 Horizon League Tournament winner As of March 6, 2012; Rankings from AP Poll

The 2011–12 Youngstown State Penguins men's basketball team represented Youngstown State University in the 2011–12 NCAA Division I men's basketball season. Their head coach was Jerry Slocum. The Penguins played their home games at the Beeghly Center and are members of the Horizon League. They advanced to the quarterfinals of the Horizon League tournament, where they lost to Detroit.

== Roster ==
2010–11 Youngstown State Penguins men's basketball team
Players
Coaches

Pos.	#	Name	Height	Weight	Year	Hometown
G	1	Blake Allen	6 ft 1 in (1.85 m)	180 lb (82 kg)	Jr	Tampa, FL
G	3	Kendrick Perry	6 ft 0 in (1.83 m)	160 lb (73 kg)	So	Ocoee, FL
G	4	Shawn Amiker, Jr.	6 ft 4 in (1.93 m)	175 lb (79 kg)	RS Fr	Oak Park, MI
G	5	Nate Perry	6 ft 2 in (1.88 m)	197 lb (89 kg)	So	Greensburg, PA
G	11	DJ Cole	5 ft 11 in (1.8 m)	175 lb (79 kg)	Fr	Olathe, KS
F	14	Josh Chojnacki	6 ft 9 in (2.06 m)	240 lb (109 kg)	So	Erie, PA
G	20	Ashen Ward	6 ft 3 in (1.91 m)	214 lb (97 kg)	Sr	Cleveland, OH
F	21	Damian Eargle	6 ft 7 in (2.01 m)	215 lb (98 kg)	Jr	Warren, OH
F	22	Cale Zuiker	6 ft 9 in (2.06 m)	190 lb (86 kg)	Fr	Marshfield, WI
F	23	DuShawn Brooks	6 ft 6 in (1.98 m)	215 lb (98 kg)	Sr	Chicago, IL
G	24	Danny Reese	5 ft 11 in (1.8 m)	160 lb (73 kg)	Fr	Youngstown, OH
F	25	Fletcher Larson	6 ft 8 in (2.03 m)	215 lb (98 kg)	So	Lakewood, NY
F	32	Chris Morgan	6 ft 6 in (1.98 m)	230 lb (104 kg)	So	Vienna, OH
G	34	Mike Podolsky	6 ft 1 in (1.85 m)	214 lb (97 kg)	So	Canfield, OH

Head coach

- Jerry Slocum (King's (NY))

Assistant coach(es)

- Michael Wernicki (Pittsburgh)
- Brian DePaoli (Clarion)
- Byron Thorne (Penn State Behrend)

Legend

- (C) Team captain
- (S) Suspended
- (I) Ineligible
- (W) Walk-on
- Injured
- Current redshirt

Roster
Last update: 2010-11-12

== Schedule ==
Date time, TV	Opponent	Result	Record	Site city, state
Regular season
Nov. 12*; 7:00 pm	at Samford	W 76–69	1–0	Pete Hanna Center (873); Homewood, AL
Nov. 15*; 7:05 pm	Notre Dame (OH)	W 80–62	2–0	Beeghly Center (1,270); Youngstown, OH
Nov. 18*; 7:05 pm	UC Riverside	W 53–49 ^{OT}	3–0	Beeghly Center (1,417); Youngstown, OH
Nov. 23*; 7:00 pm	at Penn State	L 71–82	3–1	Bryce Jordan Center (4,461); University Park, PA
Nov. 26*; 7:00 pm	at Saint Francis (PA)	W 60–59	4–1	DeGol Arena (782); Loretto, PA
Dec. 1; 7:00 pm	at Detroit	W 64–61	5–1 (1–0)	Calihan Hall (1,512); Detroit, MI
Dec. 3; 3:00 pm	at Wright State	L 62–63	5–2 (1–1)	Nutter Center (2,879); Dayton, OH
Dec. 6*; 7:45 pm	Fredonia State	W 69–35	6–2	Beeghly Center (1,198); Youngstown, OH
Dec. 10*; 7:00 pm	at Buffalo	L 72–80	6–3	Alumni Arena (1,611); Buffalo, NY
Dec. 17*; 7:00 pm	at Toledo	L 77–86	6–4	Savage Arena (4,661); Toledo, OH
Dec. 19*; 7:00 pm	at Akron	L 62–88	6–5	James A. Rhodes Arena (2,408); Akron, OH
Dec. 22; 7:05 pm	at Robert Morris	L 56–59	6–6	Charles L. Sewall Center (1,898); Moon Township, PA
Dec. 31; 2:00 pm	at Cleveland State	W 73–67	7–6 (2–1)	Wolstein Center (3,513); Cleveland, OH
Jan. 5; 7:05 pm	Loyola	W 68–64 ^{OT}	8–6 (3–1)	Beeghly Center (1,415); Youngstown, OH
Jan. 7; 7:05 pm	UIC	W 71–50	9–6 (4–1)	Beeghly Center (2,328); Youngstown, OH
Jan. 13; 8:00 pm	at Valparaiso	L 62–76	9–7 (4–2)	Athletics–Recreation Center (3,271); Valparaiso, IN
Jan. 15; 2:00 pm	at Butler	L 55–71	9–8 (4–3)	Hinkle Fieldhouse (7,298); Indianapolis, IN
Jan. 20; 7:05 pm	Milwaukee	W 68–66	10–8 (5–3)	Beeghly Center (2,845); Youngstown, OH
Jan. 22; 2:05 pm	Green Bay	W 77–47	11–8 (6–3)	Beeghly Center (1,590); Youngstown, OH
Jan. 28; 7:05 pm	Cleveland State	L 47–67	11–9 (6–4)	Beeghly Center (6,313); Youngstown, OH
Jan. 31; 8:00 pm	at Milwaukee	W 73–65	12–9 (7–4)	U.S. Cellular Arena (3,372); Milwaukee, WI
Feb. 2; 8:00 pm	at UIC	L 68–72	12–10 (7–5)	UIC Pavilion (3,394); Chicago, IL
Feb. 5; 2:00 pm	at Loyola	W 80–63	13–10 (8–5)	Joseph J. Gentile Center (1,708); Chicago, IL
Feb. 9; 7:05 pm	Butler	L 59–68	13–11 (8–6)	Beeghly Center (4,076); Youngstown, OH
Feb. 11; 7:05 pm	Valparaiso	W 71–53	14–11 (9–6)	Beeghly Center (3,374); Youngstown, OH
Feb. 14; 8:00 pm	at Green Bay	L 65–71	14–12 (9–7)	Resch Center (2,910); Green Bay, WI
Feb. 18; 8:30 pm	at Austin Peay; ESPN Sears BracketBusters	L 68–71	14–13	Dunn Center (2,112); Clarksville, TN
Feb. 23; 7:05 pm	Wright State	W 61–54	15–13 (10–7)	Beeghly Center (1,953); Youngstown, OH
Feb. 25; 2:05 pm	Detroit	L 74–76	15–14 (10–8)	Beeghly Center (2,004); Youngstown, OH
Horizon League tournament
Feb. 28; 7:05 pm, HLN	Green Bay; First Round	W 77–60	16–14	Beeghly Center (3,114); Youngstown, OH
Mar. 2; 6:00 pm, ESPN3/HLN	vs. Detroit; Quarterfinal	L 76–93	16–15	Athletics-Recreation Center (NA); Valparaiso, IN
*Non-conference game. ^{#}Rankings from Coaches' Poll. (#) Tournament seedings in parentheses. All times are in Eastern Time..
