= 2011–12 Horizon League men's basketball season =

- League: NCAA Division I
- Sport: Basketball
- Duration: 12/01/2011–02/25/2012
- Teams: 10
- TV partner(s): Fox Sports Midwest, ESPN, CBS Sports, Horizon League Network

2011–12
- Regular Season Champions: 14–4 - Valparaiso
- Season MVP: Ryan Broekhoff, VAL

2012 Horizon League Men's Basketball Tournament
- Champions: Detroit
- Runners-up: Valparaiso
- Finals MVP: Ray McCallum, Jr.

Horizon League men's basketball seasons
- ← 2010–11 2012–13 →

2011–12 Horizon League men's basketball standings
	Conf.				Overall
Team	W		L	PCT	W		L	PCT
Valparaiso	14	–	4	.778	22	–	11	.667
Cleveland State	12	–	6	.667	22	–	11	.667
Detroit †	11	–	7	.611	22	–	14	.611
Milwaukee	11	–	7	.611	20	–	13	.606
Butler	11	–	7	.611	22	–	14	.611
Youngstown State	10	–	8	.556	16	–	15	.516
Green Bay	10	–	8	.556	15	–	15	.500
Wright State	7	–	11	.389	13	–	19	.406
UIC	3	–	15	.167	8	–	22	.267
Loyola Chicago	1	–	17	.056	7	–	23	.233
† 2012 Horizon League Tournament winner As of March 6, 2012; Rankings from AP Poll

The 2011–12 Horizon League men's basketball season marks the 32nd season of Horizon League basketball.

== Preseason ==
In the preseason, Butler was the conference favorite despite returning only one of their top four scorers from the 2011 national runner-up team. Butler received 28 first-place votes in the preseason poll of HL coaches, media, and sports information directors. Detroit captured second in the preseason poll with 19 first-place votes, and Cleveland State finished third for the third consecutive preseason. The preseason player of the year was Ray McCallum, Jr. of Detroit who was also named to the John R. Wooden Award preseason candidate list.

=== HL Preseason Poll ===
Rank	Team	Votes
1	Butler (28)	468
2	Detroit (19)	453
3	Cleveland State (2)	388
4	Milwaukee (1)	356
5	Valparaiso	255
6	Green Bay	247
7	Youngstown State	195
8	Wright State	157
9	Loyola	145
10	Illinois-Chicago	86

=== Preseason All-Horizon ===
==== First Team ====
- Ray McCallum, Jr., Detroit
- Trevon Harmon, Cleveland State
- Eli Holman, Detroit
- Chase Simon, Detroit
- Kaylon Williams, Milwaukee

==== Second Team ====
- Tony Meier, Milwaukee
- Alec Brown, Green Bay
- Andrew Smith, Butler
- Ben Averkamp, Loyola
- Ryan Broekhoff, Valparaiso

Preseason Player of the Year

- Ray McCallum, Jr., Detroit

=== Conference Previews ===
Several media outlets projected the final Horizon League standings for the 2011–12 season:

Rank	CBS Sports	Rivals	Blue Ribbon	Sporting News	Lindy's	Athlon	College Hoops Insider	ESPN The Magazine	College Sports Madness
1.	Butler	Butler	Detroit	Detroit	Butler	Butler	Butler	Butler	Butler
2.	Detroit	Detroit	Cleveland St.	Milwaukee	Detroit	Detroit	Detroit	Detroit	Cleveland St.
3.	Cleveland St.	Milwaukee	Butler	Butler	Cleveland St.	Cleveland St.	Cleveland St.	Cleveland St.	Detroit
4.	Milwaukee	Cleveland St.	Milwaukee	Cleveland St.	Milwaukee	Milwaukee	Milwaukee	Milwaukee	Milwaukee
5.	Valparaiso	Valparaiso	Valparaiso	Valparaiso	Wright St.	Valparaiso	Valparaiso	Loyola	Valparaiso
6.	Wright St.	Green Bay	Youngstown St.	Green Bay	Valparaiso	Green Bay	Loyola	Valparaiso	-
7.	Green Bay	Wright St.	Green Bay	Wright St.	Green Bay	Loyola	Wright St.	Green Bay	-
8.	Loyola	Loyola	UIC	Youngstown St.	Loyola	Wright St.	Green Bay	Wright St.	-
9.	Youngstown St.	Youngstown St.	Loyola	Loyola	UIC	Youngstown St.	UIC	Youngstown St.	-
10.	UIC	UIC	Wright St.	UIC	Youngstown St.	UIC	Youngstown St.	UIC	-

== Rankings ==
Legend
	Improvement in ranking
	Drop in ranking
	Not ranked previous week
RV	Received votes but were not ranked in Top 25 of poll
Last updated:	March 7, 2012 (Week 17)

		Pre	Wk 1	Wk 2	Wk 3	Wk 4	Wk 5	Wk 6	Wk 7	Wk 8	Wk 9	Wk 10	Wk 11	Wk 12	Wk 13	Wk 14	Wk 15	Wk 16	Wk 17	Wk 18	Final
Butler	AP	RV	RV	-	-	-	-	-	-	-	-	-	-	-	-	-	-	-	-		
Butler	C	RV	RV	-	-	-	-	-	-	-	-	-	-	-	-	-	-	-	-		
Butler	Mid-Major	2	9	14	14	24	RV	RV	RV	RV	RV	-	-	-	-	RV	RV	-	RV		
Cleveland State	AP	-	RV	RV	RV	RV	RV	RV	-	-	-	-	-	-	RV	-	-	-	-		
Cleveland State	C	-	RV	RV	RV	RV	RV	-	RV	-	-	-	-	-	RV	-	-	-	-		
Cleveland State	Mid-Major	22	4	3	5	5	4	4	5	8	8	10	10	10	10	15	RV	RV	RV		
Detroit	AP	-	-	-	-	-	-	-	-	-	-	-	-	-	-	-	-	-	-		
Detroit	C	-	-	-	-	-	-	-	-	-	-	-	-	-	-	-	-	-			
Detroit	Mid-Major	15	16	20	RV	-	-	-	-	-	-	-	-	-	-	-	-	RV	RV		
Green Bay	AP	-	-	-	-	-	-	-	-	-	-	-	-	-	-	-	-	-	-		
Green Bay	C	-	-	-	-	-	-	-	-	-	-	-	-	-	-	-	-	-	-		
Green Bay	Mid-Major	RV	RV	-	-	-	-	-	-	-	-	-	-	-	-	-	-	-	-		
Illinois-Chicago	AP	-	-	-	-	-	-	-	-	-	-	-	-	-	-	-	-	-	-		
Illinois-Chicago	C	-	-	-	-	-	-	-	-	-	-	-	-	-	-	-	-	-	-		
Illinois-Chicago	Mid-Major	-	-	-	-	-	-	-	-	-	-	-	-	-	-	-	-	-	-		
Loyola	AP	-	-	-	-	-	-	-	-	-	-	-	-	-	-	-	-	-	-		
Loyola	C	-	-	-	-	-	-	-	-	-	-	-	-	-	-	-	-	-	-		
Loyola	Mid-Major	-	-	-	-	-	-	-	-	-	-	-	-	-	-	-	-	-	-		
Milwaukee	AP	-	-	-	-	-	-	-	-	-	-	-	-	-	-	-	-	-	-		
Milwaukee	C	-	-	-	-	-	-	-	-	-	-	-	-	-	-	-	-	-	-		
Milwaukee	Mid-Major	RV	RV	RV	RV	RV	RV	RV	RV	RV	RV	23	RV	-	-	-	-	-	-		
Valparaiso	AP	-	-	-	-	-	-	-	-	-	-	-	-	-	-	-	-	-	-		
Valparaiso	C	-	-	-	-	-	-	-	-	-	-	-	-	-	-	-	-	-	-		
Valparaiso	Mid-Major	RV	RV	RV	RV	22	RV	RV	-	RV	RV	RV	RV	RV	RV	22	24	20	19		
Wright State	AP	-	-	-	-	-	-	-	-	-	-	-	-	-	-	-	-	-	-		
Wright State	C	-	-	-	-	-	-	-	-	-	-	-	-	-	-	-	-	-	-		
Wright State	Mid-Major	-	-	RV	-	-	-	-	-	-	-	-	-	-	-	-	-	-	-		
Youngstown State	AP	-	-	-	-	-	-	-	-	-	-	-	-	-	-	-	-	-	-		
Youngstown State	C	-	-	-	-	-	-	-	-	-	-	-	-	-	-	-	-	-	-		
Youngstown State	Mid-Major	-	-	-	-	-	RV	-	-	-	-	-	-	-	-	-	-	-	-		

== Schedule ==
=== Exhibition schedule ===
Date time, TV	Rank^{#}	Opponent^{#}	Result	Record	High points	High rebounds	High assists	Site (attendance) city, state
Oct. 29*; 7:00 pm		DET vs. Madonna	W 112–52	–	27 – Minnerath	10 – Lowe	8 – R. McCallum	Calihan Hall (1,637); Detroit, MI
Oct. 29*; 8:05 pm		VAL vs. Hillsdale	W 73–71	–	23 – Van Wijk	12 – Broekhoff	5 – Kenney	Athletics–Recreation Center (2,946); Valparaiso, IN
Nov. 02*; 7:00 pm		BUT vs. Northern State	L 50–53	–	19 – Smith	8 – Smith	6 – Nored	Hinkle Fieldhouse (5,544); Indianapolis, IN
Nov. 02*; 8:00 pm		UIC vs. Chicago	W 61–45	–	14 – Talton	7 – Carter	3 – Barnes	UIC Pavilion (1,210); Chicago, IL
Nov. 03*; 8:05 pm		VAL vs. Augustana	W 74–65	–	14 – Edwards	7 – Van Wijk	4 – Kenney	Athletics–Recreation Center (2,488); Valparaiso, IN
Nov. 04*; 8:00 pm		GRB vs. Lawrence	W 87–56	–	10 – four tied	11 – Brown	2 – eight tied	Kress Events Center (1,523); Green Bay, WI
Nov. 05*; 7:00 pm		BUT vs. Franklin	W 91–53	–	19 – Smith	8 – Jones	8 – Nored	Hinkle Fieldhouse (8,586); Indianapolis, IN
Nov. 05*; 7:00 pm		DET vs. Ashland	W 96–65	–	24 – R. McCallum	6 – Foster; 6 - Minerath	5 – Calliste	Calihan Hall (1,441); Detroit, MI
Nov. 05*; 7:00 pm		LUC vs. Benedictine	W 73–57	–	21 – Hill	9 – Gibler	4 – Hill	Joseph J. Gentile Center (2,112); Chicago, IL
Nov. 05*; 7:00 pm		WSU vs. Central State	L 50–56	–	12 – Mays; 12 - Battle	9 – Mpondo	3 – Arceneaux	Nutter Center (3,179); Fairborn, OH
Nov. 05*; 8:00pm		UWM vs. Parkside	W 67–59	–	17 – J. McCallum	7 – Haarsma	3 – Boga	Klotsche Center (1,703); Milwaukee, WI
Nov. 08*; 8:30 pm		UIC vs. Lake Forest	W 57–33	–	14 – Williams	9 – Williams	4 – Talton	UIC Pavilion (–); Chicago, IL
Nov. 09*; 7:00 pm		CSU vs. John Carroll	W 88–58	–	18 – Pogue	12 – Grady	3 – Brown	Wolstein Center (1,583); Cleveland, OH
*Non-conference game. ^{#}Rankings from AP Poll/Coaches' Poll. (#) Tournament seedings in parentheses. All times are in Eastern Time. HLN = Horizon League Network. BTN = Big Ten Network.

=== Non-conference schedule ===
Date time, TV	Rank^{#}	Opponent^{#}	Result	Record	High points	High rebounds	High assists	Site (attendance) city, state
November
07*; 9:00 pm, ESPNU		VAL at #16/16 Arizona; Coaches Vs. Cancer Classic	L 64–73	0–1	20 – Broekhoff	10 – Broekhoff	3 – Bogan; 3 - Harris	McKale Center (12,871); Tucson, AZ
11*; 7:00 pm		UDM vs. Lake Erie	W 96–57	1–1	24 – Simon	8 – Minnerath	7 – McCallum	Calihan Hall (1,647); Detroit, MI
11*; 7:00 pm		UIC at Eastern Michigan	L 57–68	1–2	19 – Carter	11 – Carter	4 – Brown	Convocation Center (1,208); Ypsilanti, MI
11*; 7:00 pm, BTN		LUC at Illinois	L 49–67	1–3	19 – Gibler	6 – Gibler	6 – Brito	Assembly Hall (15,937); Champaign, IL
11*; 7:30 pm		VAL at Georgia Southern	W 90–81	2–3	22 – Broekhoff	13 – Broekhoff	4 – Bogan	Hanner Fieldhouse (2,547); Statesboro, GA
11*; 8:00 pm		GRB vs. U-Mary	W 94–55	3–3	18 – Brown	11 – Brown	4 – Turner	Resch Center (2,058); Green Bay, WI
11*; 9:00 pm, BTN		WSU at #3/3 Ohio State	L 42–73	3–4	13 – Pacher	6 – Sledge	2 – Battle	Value City Arena (15,645); Columbus, OH
12*; 2:00 pm		UWM vs. S.W. Minnesota State	W 71–65	4–4	16 – J. McCallum; 16 - Allen	17 – Haarsma	2 – Haarsma; 2 - Allen	U.S. Cellular Arena (2,246); Milwaukee, WI
12*; 3:00 pm, WNDY		BUT at Evansville	L 77–80	4–5	22 – Hopkins	9 – Smith	5 – Hopkins	Ford Center (9,454); Evansville, IN
12*; 7:00 pm		YSU at Samford	W 76–69	5–5	28 – Perry	8 – Eargle; 8 - Ward	4 – Perry	Pete Hanna Center (873); Homewood, AL
13*; 2:00 pm, ESPNU		CSU at #7/7 Vanderbilt	W 71–58	6–5	18 – Brown	8 – Brown	4 – Harmon	Memorial Gymnasium (13,503); Nashville, TN
13*; 2:00 pm		GRB at Duquesne	L 66–84	6–6	17 – Williams	10 – Brown	3 – Sykes; 3 - Turner	A. J. Palumbo Center (2,334); Pittsburgh, PA
13*; 3:00 pm		WSU vs. Kenyon	W 80–56	7–6	14 – Balwigaire	8 – Sledge	6 – Cuffee	Nutter Center (2,583); Fairborn, OH
14*; 8:00 pm		UWM at Northern Illinois	W 59–57	8–6	15 – Haarsma	12 – Haarsma	6 – Williams	Convocation Center (1,025); DeKalb, IL
14*; 8:00 pm, Fox Sports		LUC at Kansas State	L 61–74	8–7	19 – Averkamp	7 – Averkamp; 7 - Gac	4 – Brito	Bramlage Coliseum (12,450); Manhattan, KS
14*; 8:05 pm, HLN		VAL vs. Holy Cross (IN)	W 88–38	9–7	25 – Edwards	10 – Van Wijk	6 – Harris	Athletics–Recreation Center (1,957); Valparaiso, IN
14*; 9:00 pm, ESPNU		UDM at Notre Dame; CBE Classic	L 53–59	9–8	20 – McCallum	11 – Simon	4 – Calliste; 4 - McCallum	Edmund P. Joyce Center (6,720); Notre Dame, IN
15*; 7:00 pm, WNDY		BUT vs. Chattanooga	W 57–46	10–8	16 – Smith	10 – Smith	5 – Hopkins; 5 - Nored	Hinkle Fieldhouse (6,078); Indianapolis, IN
15*; 7:00 pm		CSU vs. Rio Grande	W 86–57	11–8	24 – Brown	9 – Brown	5 – Montgomery	Wolstein Center (1,871); Cleveland, OH
15*; 7:05 pm		YSU vs. Notre Dame (OH)	W 80–62	12–8	18 – Perry	8 – Eargle	5 – Perry; 5 - Ward	Beeghly Center (1,270); Youngstown, OH
16*; 7:00 pm		WSU vs. Jackson State	W 56–39	13–8	15 – Arceneaux	9 – Darling	3 – Darling	Nutter Center (3,159); Fairborn, OH
16*; 8:00 pm		GRB at North Dakota State	W 65–61	13–9	16 – Baker; 16 - Brown	9 – Cougill	5 – Sykes	Bison Sports Arena (2,450); Fargo, ND
16*; 8:00 pm		UIC vs. Roosevelt	W 59–42	14–9	18 – Williams	12 – Williams	3 – four tied	UIC Pavilion (2,309); Chicago, IL
16*; 8:00 pm		LUC at Eastern Illinois	L 61–65	14–10	15 – Gibler	7 – Averkamp	5 – Brito	Lantz Arena (1,233); Charleston, IL
18*; 7:00 pm		CSU vs. St. Bonaventure	W 67–64	15–10	20 – Harmon	6 – Pogue	4 – Kamczyc	Wolstein Center (3,073); Cleveland, OH
18*; 7:00 pm		UDM vs. Concordia (MI)	W 113–68	16–10	19 – Calliste	13 – Anderson	8 – Simon	Calihan Hall (1,551); Detroit, MI
18*; 7:05 pm		YSU vs. UC Riverside	W 53–49 ^{OT}	17–10	15 – Ward	14 – Brooks	3 – Allen	Beeghly Center (1,417); Youngstown, OH
18*; 8:00 pm, Sports 32		UWM vs. IUPUI; Auto Owners Insurance Spartan Invitational	W 62–49	18–10	14 – Allen; 14 - Kelm	8 – Williams	8 – Williams	U.S. Cellular Arena (3,022); Milwaukee, WI
18*; 8:30 pm, HLN		VAL vs. Akron; 2K Sports Classic	W 62–59	19–10	21 – Van Wijk	11 – Broekhoff	5 – Kenney	Athletics–Recreation Center (3,876); Valparaiso, IN
19*; 2:00 pm, ESPN3		BUT vs. #8/7 Louisville	L 53–69	19–11	20 – Marshall	6 – Marshall	7 – Nored	Hinkle Fieldhouse (9,071); Indianapolis, IN
19*; 4:00 pm		UIC vs. Quincy	L 61–65	19–12	17 – Barnes	7 – Williams	4 – Williams; 4 - Talton	UIC Pavilion (1,742); Chicago, IL
19*; 8:00 pm		GRB vs. Wyoming	W 52–44	20–12	15 – Brown	9 – Cougill	3 – Turner	Resch Center (2,740); Green Bay, WI
19*; 8:30 pm, HLN		VAL vs. IU-Kokomo; 2K Sports Classic	W 79–48	21–12	13 – Broekhoff	15 – Vucic	4 – Carpenter	Athletics–Recreation Center (2,244); Valparaiso, IN
20*; 2:00 pm		LUC at Furman	L 51–63	21–13	12 – Crisman	6 – Averkamp; 6 - Gibler	6 – Brito; 3 - Crisman	Timmons Arena (903); Greenville, SC
20*; 4:30 pm, HLN		VAL vs. Duquesne; 2K Sports Classic	W 84–68	22–13	22 – Van Wijk	13 – Broekhoff	6 – Broekhoff	Athletics–Recreation Center (2,011); Valparaiso, IN
20*; 5:00 pm		UWM vs. Texas Southern; Auto Owners Insurance Spartan Invitational	W 73–38	23–13	17 – Williams	10 – Kelm	6 – Williams	U.S. Cellular Arena (2,531); Milwaukee, WI
21*; 5:00 pm		UDM vs. George Washington; CBE Classic	L 73–86	23–14	18 – Minnerath	10 – Lowe	4 – Calliste	Stroh Center (–); Bowling Green, OH
21*; 7:00 pm, WNDY		BUT vs. Savannah State; Hoosier Invitational	W 57–42	24–14	11 – Smith	6 – Jones; 6 - Woods	5 – Nored	Hinkle Fieldhouse (5,080); Indianapolis, IN
21*; 7:00 pm, Fox Sports		WSU at Florida	L 65–78	24–15	21 – Mays	4 – three tied	3 – Arceneaux; 3 - Mays	St. Pete Times Forum (6,331); Tampa, FL
21*; 7:05 pm		GRB at Indiana State	L 56–57	24–16	15 – Baker	5 – Sykes	5 – Johnson	Hulman Center (4,761); Terre Haute, IN
22*; 7:30 pm		CSU at Kent State	W 57–53	25–16	13 – Montgomery	6 – Grady	3 – Lee; 3 - Montgomery	MACC (6,327); Kent, OH
22*; 7:30 pm		UDM at Bowling Green; CBE Classic	L 61–67	25–17	17 – Bruinsma	9 – Calliste	3 – Calliste	Stroh Center (1,379); Bowling Green, OH
23*; 5:00 pm		UDM vs. Austin Peay; CBE Classic	W 94–93 ^{OT}	26–17	20 – Simon	12 – Bruinsma	3 – three tied	Stroh Center (159); Bowling Green, OH
23*; 7:00 pm, WNDY		BUT vs. Gardner–Webb; Hoosier Invitational	W 68–66	27–17	22 – Hopkins	6 – Smith	7 – Nored	Hinkle Fieldhouse (6,036); Indianapolis, IN
23*; 7:00 pm, BTN		UWM at Michigan State; Auto Owners Insurance Spartan Invitational	L 55–68	27–18	14 – Williams	8 – Haarsma	3 – Williams	Breslin Center (14,797); East Lansing, MI
23*; 7:00 pm		WSU at North Florida	L 52–69	27–19	15 – Mays	7 – Pacher	4 – Mays	UNF Arena (824); Jacksonville, FL
23*; 7:00 pm		YSU at Penn State	L 71–82	27–20	25 – Allen	5 – three tied	3 – four tied	Bryce Jordan Center (4,461); University Park, PA
23*; 8:00 pm		UIC vs. Evansville	W 79–75	28–20	24 – Brown	6 – three tied	7 – Travis	UIC Pavilion (1,987); Chicago, IL
25*; 2:30 pm		CSU vs. Boston University; Ticketcity Legends Classic	W 63–62	29–20	14 – Brown; 14 - Grady	11 – Pogue	4 – Harmon	Ryan Center (–); Kingston, RI
25*; 6:30 pm, BTN		VAL at Ohio State	L 47–80	29–21	18 – Harris	11 – Broekhoff	3 – Buggs; Kenney	Value City Arena (15,606); Columbus, OH
25*; 7:00 pm, ESPN3		GRB at Virginia	L 42–68	29–22	11 – Sykes	4 – Williams	2 – Cougill	John Paul Jones Arena (9,113); Charlottesville, VA
26*; 2:30 pm		CSU vs. Hofstra; Ticketcity Legends Classic	L 53–63	29–23	12 – Montgomery	3 – three tied	4 – Kamczyc	Ryan Center (–); Kingston, RI
26*; 4:00 pm		LUC vs. Fordham	W 64–50	30–23	14 – Crisman	8 – Averkamp	10 – Brito	Joseph J. Gentile Center (1,947); Chicago, IL
26*; 7:00 pm		UIC at Toledo	L 67–82	30–24	11 – Humes	10 – Humes	4 – Talton	Savage Arena (4,093); Toledo, OH
26*; 7:00 pm		WSU vs. Charlotte	L 66–70	30–25	25 – Mays	5 – Mays	3 – three tied	Nutter Center (2,993); Fairborn, OH
26*; 7:00 pm		YSU at Saint Francis (PA)	W 60–59	31–25	12 – Perry	7 – Brooks	3 – Perry	DeGol Arena (782); Loretto, PA
26*; 8:00 pm		UWM at Little Rock; Auto Owners Insurance Spartan Invitational	W 59–54	32–25	17 – Haarsma	8 – Kelm	7 – Williams	Jack Stephens Center (2,431); Little Rock, AR
26*; 7:00 pm		UDM at Akron	L 63–81	32–26	27 – Simon	7 – Simon	4 – McCallum	James A. Rhodes Arena (2,585); Akron, OH
27*; 2:30 pm		CSU at Rhode Island; Ticketcity Legends Classic	W 67–45	33–26	20 – Pogue	5 – Pogue	8 – Montgomery	Ryan Center (2,737); Kingston, RI
27*; 7:00 pm, BTN		BUT at Indiana; Hoosier Invitational	L 59–75	33–27	19 – Hopkins	7 – Smith	2 – Jones; 2 - Nored	Assembly Hall (17,265); Bloomington, IN
29*; 7:00 pm, WNDY		BUT vs. Oakland City	W 98–53	34–27	17 – Smeathers	12 – Smith	7 – Nored	Hinkle Fieldhouse (5,677); Indianapolis, IN
December
05*; 7:00 pm, ESPN2		UDM vs. St. John's	W 69–63	35–27	21 – McCallum	8 – Anderson	4 – McCallum	Calihan Hall (5,377); Detroit, MI
05*; 9:00 pm, Sports 32		UWM at Depaul	W 87–76	36–27	21 – Williams	8 – Allen	5 – Williams	Allstate Arena (6,661); Rosemont, IL
06*; 7:45 pm		YSU vs. Fredonia State	W 69–35	37–27	14 – Allen	5 – Larson; 5 - Perry	4 – Cole	Beeghly Center (1,198); Youngstown, OH
07*; 7:00 pm		VAL at IPFW	L 76–85	37–28	20 – Broekhoff	9 – Van Wijk	4 – Harris	Memorial Coliseum (1,550); Fort Wayne, IN
07*; 8:00 pm, ESPN3		GRB at #14/16 Wisconsin	L 42–70	37–29	10 – Brown	8 – Cougill	2 – Baker; 2 - Valentin	Kohl Center (17,076); Madison, WI
07*; 8:00 pm		LUC vs. DePaul	L 58–69	37–30	29 – Gibler	11 – Averkamp	3 – Averkamp	Joseph J. Gentile Center (4,186); Chicago, IL
07*; 9:00 pm, ESPN2		BUT vs. #8/8 Xavier	L 61–73	37–31	10 – Jones; 10 - Stigall	11 – Jones	5 – Nored	Hinkle Fieldhouse (7,033); Indianapolis, IN
07*; 9:00 pm		WSU at Air Force	L 34–55	37–32	7 – Darling	7 – Sledge	1 – four tied	Clune Arena (1,471); Colorado Springs, CO
08*; 7:00 pm		CSU at Robert Morris	W 62–58	38–32	24 – Harmon	5 – Grady	2 – three tied	Sewall Center (1,378); Moon Township, PA
08*; 7:30 pm		UDM vs. Western Michigan	W 92–81	39–32	21 – Holman	7 – Holman; 7 - Lowe	6 – McCallum	Calihan Hall (2,148); Detroit, MI
10*; 2:00 pm, WNDY		BUT at Ball State	L 55–58	39–33	21 – Marshall	16 – Marshall	4 – Aldridge	John E. Worthen Arena (8,412); Muncie, IN
10*; 2:00 pm		CSU vs. Akron	W 69–66	40–33	16 – Harmon	4 – three tied	4 – Kamczyc; 4 - Montgomery	Wolstein Center (4,739); Cleveland, OH
10*; 2:00 pm		GRB at #11/11 Marquette	L 61–79	40–34	22 – Brown	14 – Brown	4 – Cerroni; 4 - Cougill	Bradley Center (14,208); Milwaukee, WI
10*; 2:00 pm		UWM at Northern Iowa	L 51–67	40–35	21 – Koch	6 – Moran; 6 - Tuttle	3 – Koch	McLeod Center (4,067); Cedar Falls, IA
10*; 3:00 pm		LUC at Toledo	W 57–55	41–35	31 – Averkamp	13 – Thomas	5 – Brito	Savage Arena (4,279); Toledo, OH
10*; 3:30 pm, ONN		WSU at Miami	W 51–39	42–35	13 – Darling	7 – Pacher	3 – Balwigaire	Millett Hall (2,544); Oxford, OH
10*; 4:00 pm		UIC vs. Northern Illinois	W 62–55	43–35	15 – Brown	10 – Humes	4 – Talton	UIC Pavilion (3,026); Chicago, IL
10*; 7:00 pm		YSU at Buffalo	L 72–80	42–36	18 – Perry	11 – Eargle	10 – Perry	Alumni Arena (1,611); Buffalo, NY
10*; 8:05 pm, HLN		VAL vs. Bowling Green	W 82–79	44–36	20 – Broekhoff; 20 - Harris	9 – Broekhoff	3 – four tied	Athletics–Recreation Center (3,667); Valparaiso, IN
11*; 6:00 pm, ESPNU		UDM at Alabama	L 54–62	43–37	13 – McCallum	10 – Lowe	4 – McCallum	Coleman Coliseum (10,011); Tuscaloosa, AL
13*; 8:00 pm		GRB vs. Michigan Tech	W 69–61	45–37	20 – Brown	9 – Brown	2 – three tied	Resch Center (2,121); Green Bay, WI
13*; 8:00 pm, Sports 32		UWM vs. Wisconsin	L 54–60	44–38	15 – Meier	8 – Allen	7 – Williams	U.S. Cellular Arena (10,143); Milwaukee, WI
13*; 10:00 pm, RTNW		UIC at Oregon State	L 53–95	44–39	8 – Barnes; 8 - Travis	5 – Williams	4 – Travis	Gill Coliseum (3,477); Corvallis, OR
14*; 7:00 pm, ESPN3		WSU vs. Cincinnati	L 58–78	44–40	11 – Balwigaire; 11 - Pacher	6 – Pacher	2 – Battle; 2 - Mays	Nutter Center (5,977); Fairborn, OH
16*; 7:00 pm		UIC at Central Michigan	L 67–70	44–41	20 – Barnes	9 – Williams	3 – Talton; 3 - Travis	McGuirk Arena (927); Mount Pleasant, MI
17*; 12:00 pm		UDM vs. Mississippi State	L 75–80	44–42	17 – McCallum; 17 - Simon	9 – Holman	4 – Boutte	Calihan Hall (2,217); Detroit, MI
17*; 2:00 pm, CBS		BUT vs. Purdue; Crossroads Classic	W 67–65	46–42	12 – Smith; 12 - Woods	7 – Nored	4 – Jones	Conseco Fieldhouse (18,165); Indianapolis, IN
17*; 4:00 pm		LUC vs. Chicago State	W 64–49	47–42	21 – Averkamp	10 – Averkamp; 10 - Gibler	3 – Brito	Joseph J. Gentile Center (1,344); Chicago, IL
17*; 7:00 pm		WSU vs. Ohio	L 54–82	47–43	11 – Darling	7 – Darling	4 – Arceneaux	Nutter Center (3,749); Fairborn, OH
17*; 7:00 pm		YSU at Toledo	L 77–86	47–44	22 – Allen	9 – Eargle	5 – Perry	Savage Arena (4,661); Toledo, OH
17*; 8:00 pm		UWM vs. Omaha	W 86–50	48–44	19 – Meier	7 – Meier	8 – Williams	Klotsche Center (2,446); Milwaukee, WI
17*; 8:05 pm, HLN		VAL vs. Oakland	L 80–82	48–45	22 – Van Wijk	12 – Broekhoff	7 – Kenney	Athletics–Recreation Center (2,884); Valparaiso, IN
19*; 7:00 pm		CSU at South Florida	L 55–70	48–46	14 – Kamczyc	9 – Grady	4 – Lee	USF Sun Dome (2,942); Tampa, FL
19*; 7:00 pm		YSU at Akron	L 62–88	48–47	20 – Brooks	9 – Eargle	5 – Perry	James A. Rhodes Arena (2,408); Akron, OH
19*; 8:00 pm		LUC vs. Rockhurst	W 69–46	49–47	23 – Averkamp	8 – Averkamp	4 – Clark	Joseph J. Gentile Center (1,053); Chicago, IL
19*; 8:30 pm		UIC vs. Western Illinois	W 57–56	50–47	22 – Barnes	9 – Humes	6 – Talton	UIC Pavilion (2,437); Chicago, IL
20*; 7:00 pm		WSU vs. Idaho	W 80–78	51–47	28 – Mays	7 – Sledge	4 – Mays	Nutter Center (3,040); Fairborn, OH
20*; 8:00 pm		VAL at Northern Illinois	W 59–48	52–47	19 – Broekhoff	11 – Broekhoff	6 – Buggs	Convocation Center (850); DeKalb, IL
20*; 9:00 pm, ESPN2		BUT at Gonzaga	L 55–71	52–48	16 – Fromm	7 – Jones; 7 - Smith	5 – Nored	McCarthey Athletic Center (6,000); Spokane, WA
22*; 7:00 pm		CSU vs. Sam Houston State	W 63–45	53–48	12 – Brown	8 – Brown	2 – four tied	Wolstein Center (2,683); Cleveland, OH
22*; 7:00 pm		UDM vs. Alabama State	W 80–56	54–48	19 – McCallum	12 – Anderson	5 – McCallum	Calihan Hall (2,189); Detroit, MI
22*; 7:00 pm		WSU vs. Central Michigan	W 60–42	55–48	13 – Hall	6 – Battle	6 – Mays	Nutter Center (3,684); Fairborn, OH
22*; 7:05 pm		YSU at Robert Morris	L 56–59	55–49	18 – Perry	8 – Allen	3 – Perry	Charles L. Sewall Center (1,898); Moon Township, PA
22*; 7:30 pm		LUC at Canisius	W 59–45	56–49	22 – Averkamp	12 – Gibler	4 – Hicks	Koessler Athletic Center (1,387); Buffalo, NY
22*; 8:00 pm		GRB vs. Idaho	W 63–61	57–49	19 – Cougill	19 – Cougill	3 – Cerroni; 3 - Cougill	Resch Center (2,514); Green Bay, WI
22*; 9:00 pm, Fox Sports		BUT at Stanford	W 71–66	58–49	18 – Nored	9 – Jones	5 – Nored	Maples Pavilion (5,693); Stanford, CA
22*; 7:00 pm, Sports 32		UWM at Marquette	L 50–64	58–50	16 – Allen	13 – Allen	3 – Williams	Bradley Center (14,917); Milwaukee, WI
23*; 1:00 pm		VAL at IUPUI	L 88–97	58–51	19 – Van Wijk	7 – Edwards	6 – Kenney	The Jungle (1,576); Indianapolis, IN
23*; 6:00 pm		UIC at Dayton	L 57–64	58–52	17 – Barnes	8 – Williams	7 – Talton	University of Dayton Arena (12,113); Dayton, OH
28*; 7:00 pm		CSU at Toledo	W 72–64	59–52	14 – Harmon	9 – Brown	4 – Harmon	Savage Arena (4,032); Toledo, OH
January
03*; 7:00 pm		UWM at Western Michigan	L 61–72	59–53	16 – Gulley	8 – Allen	12 – Williams	University Arena (2,246); Kalamazoo, MI
February
17*; 9:00 pm, ESPNU		VAL at Loyola Marymount; Bracket Buster	L 53–61	19–10	17 – Edwards	6 – Boggs	5 – Buggs	Gersten Pavilion (4,021); Los Angeles, CA
18*; 11:00 am, ESPNU		CSU vs. Drexel; Bracket Buster	L 49–69	20–8	23 – Harmon	8 – Grady & Pogue	3 – Lee	Wolstein Center (2,583); Cleveland, OH
18*; 2:00 pm, WNDY		BUT vs. Indiana State; Bracket Buster	W 75–54	17–12	12 – Smith	12 – Jones	9 – Nored	Hinkle Fieldhouse (10,000); Indianapolis, IN
18*; 2:00 pm		UDM vs. James Madison; Bracket Buster	W 82–70	17–12	19 – Calliste	7 – Anderson	7 – R. McCallum	Calihan Hall (2,017); Detroit, MI
18*; 2:00 pm		GRB vs. Eastern Michigan; Bracket Buster	W 54–49	12–14	10 – Cerroni & Sykes	13 – A. Brown	4 – Baker	Resch Center (3,539); Green Bay, WI
18*; 4:00 pm		UWM vs. Fairfield; Bracket Buster	W 67–63	17–12	19 – Gulley	5 – Meier	10 – K. Williams	U.S. Cellular Arena (5,683); Milwaukee, WI
18*; 5:05 pm		WSU at UMKC; Bracket Buster	W 76–62	13–16	25 – Mays	6 – Mpondo	4 – Arceneaux	Swinney Center (888); Kansas City, MO
18*; 7:00 pm		UIC at Eastern Illinois; Bracket Buster	W 67–63	8–18	20 – Talton	7 – Humes & Talton	3 – M. Brown & Talton	Lantz Arena (1,789); Charleston, IL
18*; 8:00 pm		LUC at Bradley; Bracket Buster	W 56–44	7–19	19 – Averkamp	10 – Averkamp	5 – Averkamp	Carver Arena (7,680); Peoria, IL
18*; 8:30 pm		YSU at Austin Peay; Bracket Buster	L 68–71	14–13	20 – Perry	10 – Eargle	5 – Allen	Dunn Center (2,112); Clarksville, TN
*Non-conference game. ^{#}Rankings from AP Poll/Coaches' Poll. (#) Tournament seedings in parentheses. All times are in Eastern Time. HLN = Horizon League Network. BTN = Big Ten Network.

==== Horizon vs. other conferences ====
Conference	Wins	Losses	%
Am. East	1	0	1.000
A-10	4	5	.444
ACC	0	1	.000
A-Sun	0	1	.000
Big 12	0	1	.000
Big East	2	7	.222
Big Sky	0	0	-
Big South	1	0	1.000
Big Ten	1	8	.111
Big West	1	0	1.000
Colonial	1	2	.333
C-USA	0	0	-
Great West	1	0	1.000
Independents	1	0	1.000
Ivy League	0	0	-
MAAC	2	0	1.000
MAC	13	11	.542
MEAC	1	0	1.000
MVC	3	3	.500
MWC	1	1	.500
NEC	2	1	.667
OVC	2	2	.500
Pac-12	1	2	.333
Patriot	0	0	-
SEC	1	3	.250
SoCon	3	1	.750
Southland	1	0	1.000
SWAC	3	0	1.000
Summit	3	4	.429
Sun Belt	1	0	1.000
WCC	0	2	.000
WAC	2	0	1.000
NCAA Division II	7	1	.875
NCAA Division III	2	0	1.000
NAIA	5	0	1.000
Total	66	56	.541

=== Conference schedule ===
Date time, TV	Opponent	Result	Record	High points	High rebounds	High assists	Site (attendance) city, state
Dec. 01; 7:00 pm, no	CSU at WSU						Nutter Center (3,349); Dayton, OH
Dec. 01; 7:00 pm, no	YSU at DET						Calihan Hall (1,512); Detroit, MI
Dec. 01; 8:00 pm, no	UIC at GRB						Resch Center (2,067); Green Bay, WI
Dec. 01; 8:00 pm, no	LOY at UWM						Nutter Center (3,517); Dayton, OH
Dec. 03; 2:00 pm, no	VAL at BUT						Hinkle Fieldhouse (7,239); Indianapolis, IN
Dec. 03; 2:00 pm, no	CSU at DET						Calihan Hall (1,880); Detroit, MI
Dec. 03; 2:00 pm, no	UIC at UWM						US Cellular Arena (3,330); Milwaukee, WI
Dec. 03; 3:00 pm, no	YSU at WSU						Nutter Center (2,879); Dayton, OH
Dec. 03; 8:00 pm, no	LOY at GRB						Resch Center (3,047); Green Bay, WI
Dec. 29; 6:05 pm, no	UWM at VAL						The ARC (2,644); Valparaiso, IN
Dec. 29; 7:00 pm, no	GRB at BUT						Hinkle Fieldhouse (7,550); Indianapolis, IN
Dec. 29; 8:00 pm, no	DET at UIC						UIC Pavilion (2,162); Chicago, IL
Dec. 29; 8:00 pm, no	WSU at LOY						Gentile Center (1,429); Chicago, IL
Dec. 31; 2:00 pm, no	UWM at BUT						Hinkle Fieldhouse (7,291); Indianapolis, IN
Dec. 31; 2:00 pm, no	YSU at CSU						Wolstein Center (3,513); Cleveland, OH
Dec. 31; 2:00 pm, no	DET at LOY						Gentile Center (1,564); Chicago, IL
Dec. 31; 2:00 pm, no	WSU at UIC						UIC Pavilion (1,836); Chicago, IL
Dec. 31; 4:05 pm, no	GRB at VAL						The ARC (2,353); Valparaiso, IN
Jan. 05; 7:00 pm, no	UIC at CSU						Wolstein Center (2,137); Cleveland, OH
Jan. 05; 7:05 pm, no	LOY at YSU						Beeghly Center (1,415); Youngstown, OH
Jan. 06; 7:00 pm, no	BUT at WSU						Nutter Center (6,588); Dayton, OH
Jan. 06; 8:00 pm, no	VAL at DET						Calihan Hall (2,271); Detroit, MI
Jan. 07; 2:00 pm, no	LOY at CSU						Wolstein Center (3,107); Cleveland, OH
Jan. 07; 7:05 pm, no	UIC at YSU						Beeghly Center (2,328); Youngstown, OH
Jan. 07; 8:00 pm, no	GRB at UWM						US Cellular Arena (4,437); Milwaukee, WI
Jan. 08; 3:00 pm, no	VAL at WSU						Nutter Center (3,736); Dayton, OH
Jan. 08; 4:00 pm, no	BUT at DET						Calihan Hall (4,149); Detroit, MI
Jan. 12; 8:00 pm, no	DET at GRB						Resch Center (2,142); Green Bay, WI
Jan. 12; 8:00 pm, no	WSU at UWM						US Cellular Arena (2,364); Milwaukee, WI
Jan. 13; 7:00 pm, no	CSU at BUT						Hinkle Fieldhouse (7,994); Indianapolis, IN
Jan. 13; 8:00 pm, no	YSU at VAL						The Arc (3,271); Valparaiso, IN
Jan. 14; 2:00 pm, no	WSU at GRB						Resch Center (3,449); Green Bay, WI
Jan. 14; 4:00 pm, no	LOY at UIC						UIC Pavilion (3,153); Chicago, IL
Jan. 14; 8:00 pm, no	DET at UWM						US Cellular Arena (4,038); Milwaukee, WI
Jan. 15; 2:00 pm, no	YSU at BUT						Hinkle Fieldhouse (7,298); Indianapolis, WI
Jan. 15; 2:35 pm, no	CSU at VAL						The Arc (4,124); Valparaiso, IN
Jan. 19; 8:00 pm, no	VAL at LOY						Gentile Center (2,555); Chicago, IL
Jan. 19; 8:30 pm, no	BUT at UIC						UIC Pavilion (5,931); Chicago, IL
Jan. 20; 7:05 pm, no	UWM at YSU						Beeghly Center (2,845); Youngstown, OH
Jan. 20; 8:00 pm, no	GRB at CSU						Wolstein Center (2,941); Cleveland, OH
Jan. 21; 12:00 pm, no	WSU at DET						Calihan Hall (2,247); Detroit, MI
Jan. 21; 2:00 pm, no	BUT at LOY						Gentile Center (4,347); Chicago, IL
Jan. 21; 4:00 pm, no	VAL at UIC						UIC Pavilion (3,367); Chicago, IL
Jan. 22; 2:00 pm, no	UWM at CSU						Wolstein Center (3,235); Cleveland, OH
Jan. 22; 2:05 pm, no	GRB at YSU						Beeghly Center (1,590); Youngstown, OH
Jan. 25; 7:00 pm, no	LOY at DET						Calihan Hall (1,985); Detroit, MI
Jan. 25; 7:00 pm, no	UIC at WSU						Nutter Center (3,578); Dayton, OH
Jan. 26; 8:00 pm, no	BUT at UWM						US Cellular Arena (6,435); Milwaukee, WI
Jan. 26; 8:00 pm, no	VAL at GRB						Resch Center (2,546); Green Bay, WI
Jan. 27; 7:00 pm, no	UIC at DET						Calihan Hall (2,318); Detroit, MI
Jan. 27; 7:00 pm, no	LOY at WSU						Nutter Center (4,743); Dayton, OH
Jan. 28; 2:00 pm, no	VAL at UWM						US Cellular Arena (5,773); Milwaukee, WI
Jan. 28; 7:00 pm, no	BUT at GRB						Resch Center (5,820); Green Bay, WI
Jan. 28; 7:05 pm, no	CSU at YSU						Beeghly Center (6,313); Youngstown, OH
Jan. 31; 8:00 pm, no	YSU at UWM						US Cellular Arena (3,372); Milwaukee, WI
Feb. 02; 7:00 pm, no	WSU at BUT						Hinkle Fieldhouse (6,543); Indianapolis, IN
Feb. 02; 8:00 pm, no	YSU at UIC						UIC Pavilion (3,394); Chicago, IL
Feb. 02; 8:05 pm, no	DET at VAL						The Arc (3,488); Valparaiso, IN
Feb. 03; 9:00 pm, no	CSU at LOY						Gentile Center (2,443); Chicago, IL
Feb. 04; 12:00 pm, no	DET at BUT						Hinkle Fieldhouse (10,000); Indianapolis, IN
Feb. 04; 2:00 pm, no	UWM at GRB						Resch Center (5,124); Green Bay, WI
Feb. 04; 8:00 pm, no	WSU at VAL						The Arc (4,727); Valparaiso, IN
Feb. 05; 2:00 pm, no	CSU at UIC						UIC Pavilion (1,923); Chicago, IL
Feb. 05; 2:00 pm, no	YSU at LOY						Gentile Center (1,708); Chicago, IL
Feb. 09; 7:00 pm, no	BUT at YSU						Beeghly Center (4,076); Youngstown, OH
Feb. 09; 7:00 pm, no	VAL at CSU						Wolstein Center (4,521); Cleveland, OH
Feb. 10; 7:00 pm, no	UWM at DET						Calihan Hall (1,274); Detroit, MI
Feb. 10; 9:00 pm, no	GRB at WSU						Nutter Center (4,557); Dayton, OH
Feb. 11; 11:00 am, no	BUT at CSU						Wolstein Center (5,021); Cleveland, OH
Feb. 11; 2:00 pm, no	UIC at LOY						Gentile Center (2,436); Chicago, IL
Feb. 11; 7:00 pm, no	VAL at YSU						Beeghly Center (3,374); Youngstown, OH
Feb. 12; 1:00 pm, no	GRB at DET						Calihan Hall (1,923); Detroit, MI
Feb. 12; 3:00 pm, no	UWM at WSU						Nutter Center (-); Dayton, OH
Feb. 14; 7:00 pm, no	LOY at BUT						Hinkle Fieldhouse (5,812); Indianapolis, IN
Feb. 14; 8:00 pm, no	CSU at UWM						US Cellular Arena (3,643); Milwaukee, WI
Feb. 14; 8:00 pm, no	YSU at GRB						Resch Center (2,910); Green Bay, WI
Feb. 14; 8:05 pm, no	UIC at VAL						The ARC (2,714); Valparaiso, IN
Feb. 15; 7:00 pm, no	DET at WSU						Nutter Center (3,565); Dayton, OH
Feb. 21; 7:00 pm, no	UIC at BUT						Hinkle Fieldhouse (6,529); Indianapolis, IN
Feb. 21; 8:00 pm, no	CSU at 'GRB						Resch Center (2,819); Green Bay, WI
Feb. 21; 8:05 pm, no	LOY at VAL						The ARC (3,337); Valparaiso, IN
Feb. 23; 7:00 pm, no	DET at CSU						Wolstein Center (2,325); Cleveland, OH
Feb. 23; 7:00 pm, no	WSU at YSU						Beeghly Center (1,953); Youngstown, OH
Feb. 23; 8:00 pm, no	UWM at UIC						UIC Pavilion (3,997); Chicago, IL
Feb. 23; 8:00 pm, no	GRB at LOY						Gentile Center (1,665); Chicago, IL
Feb. 24; 7:00 pm, no	BUT at VAL						The ARC (5,237); Valparaiso, IN
Feb. 25; 2:00 pm, no	WSU at CSU						Wolstein Center (-); Cleveland, OH
Feb. 25; 2:00 pm, no	GRB at UIC						UIC Pavilion (-); Chicago, IL
Feb. 25; 2:05 pm, no	DET at YSU						Beeghly Center (-); Youngstown, OH
Feb. 25; 4:00 pm, no	UWM at LOY						Gentile Center (-); Chicago, IL
*Non-conference game. ^{#}Rankings from AP Poll/Coaches' Poll. (#) Tournament seedings in parentheses. All times are in Eastern Time..

==== Conference Chart ====
	@ BUT	@ CSU	@ DET	@ GRB	@ UIC	@ LUC	@ UWM	@ VAL	@ WSU	@ YSU	vs. BUT	vs. CSU	vs. DET	vs. GRB	vs. UIC	vs. LUC	vs. UWM	vs. VAL	vs. WSU	vs. YSU
Butler		W 52–49	L 65–76	L 68–80	W 57–49	W 63–57	L 42–53	L 59–71	W 63–62	W 68–59		L 69–76	L 61–65	W 53–49	W 69–44	W 63–57	W 54–50	L 71–77^{OT}	W 64–53	W 71–55
Cleveland State	W 76–69		W 66–61	L 67–71	W 70–42	W 65–47	L 84–86	L 66–72	W 45–43	W 67–47	L 49–52		W 77–64	W 78–68	W 73–56	W 69–48	W 83–57	L 41–59	Feb. 25	L 67–73
Detroit	W 65–61	L 64–77		W 80–73	L 59–63	W 65–54	L 74–84	L 73–78	W 71–55	Feb. 25	W 76–65	L 61–66		W 77–74	W 70–66	W 67–52	W 58–57	L 71–73	W 69–53	L 61–64
Green Bay	L 49–53	L 68–78	L 74–77		Feb. 25	W 73–70^{OT}	L 63–64	L 87–90	W 53–48	L 47–77	W 80–68	W 71–67	L 73–80		W 71–68	W 57–47	L 75–81	W 75–60	W 57–56	W 71–65
Illinois-Chicago	L 44–69	L 56–73	L 66–70	L 68–71		L 69–78	L 71–73^{OT}	L 65–74	L 63–69	L 50–71	L 49–57	L 42–70	W 63–59	Feb. 25		W 58–51	L 61–72	L 55–60	L 70–74^{OT}	W 72–68
Loyola	L 57–63	L 48–69	L 52–67	L 47–57	L 51–58		L 41–59	L 62–66^{OT}	L 41–47	L 64–68^{OT}	L 57–63	L 47–65	L 54–66	L 70–73^{OT}	W 78–69		Feb. 25	L 48–69	L 48–64	L 63–80
Milwaukee	L 50–54	L 57–83	L 57–58	W 81–75	W 72–61	Feb. 25		W 57–55	L 46–70	L 66–68	W 53–42	W 86–84	W 84–74	W 64–63	W 73–71^{OT}	W 59–41		L 52–55	W 58–38	L 65–73
Valparaiso	W 77–71^{OT}	W 59–41	W 71–73	L 60–75	W 60–55	W 69–48	W 55–52		L 55–73	L 53–71	W 71–59	W 72–66	W 78–73	W 90–87	W 74–65	W 66–62	L 55–57		W 63–54	W 76–62
Wright State	L 53–64	Feb. 25	L 53–69	L 56–57	W 74–70^{OT}	W 64–48	L 38–58	L 54–63		L 54–61	L 62–63	L 43–45	L 55–71	L 48–53	W 69–63	W 47–41	W 70–46	W 73–55		W 63–62
Youngstown State	L 55–71	W 73–67	W 64–61	L 65–71	L 68–72	W 80–63	W 73–65	L 52–76	L 62–63		L 59–68	L 47–67	Feb. 25	W 77–47	W 71–50	W 68–64^{OT}	W 68–66	W 71–53	W 61–54	

== Conference awards and honors ==
=== Weekly awards ===
HL Players of the Week
Throughout the conference season, the HL offices name a player of the week.

Week	Player of the week	Team
11/14	D'Aundray Brown	Cleveland State
11/21	Kevin Van Wijk	Valparaiso
11/28	James Haarsma	Milwaukee
12/5	DuShawn Brooks	Youngstown State
12/12	Trey Harmon	Cleveland State
12/19	Andrew Smith	Butler
12/26	Brennan Cougill	Green Bay
12/26	Julius Mays	Wright State
1/2	Damian Eargle	Youngstown State
1/9	Julius Mays	Wright State
1/9	Ashen Ward	Youngstown State
1/16	Kevin Van Wijk	Valparaiso
1/23	Blake Allen	Youngstown State
1/30	Ray McCallum, Jr.	Detroit
2/6	Kendrick Perry	Youngstown State
2/13	Roosevelt Jones	Butler
2/20	Ben Averkamp	Loyola
2/27		
