= 2011–12 Illinois State Redbirds men's basketball team =

American college basketball season

2011–12 Illinois State Redbirds men's basketball

NIT tournament, Second Round
- Conference: Missouri Valley Conference
- Record: 21–14 (9–9 MVC)
- Head coach: Tim Jankovich (5th season)
- Assistant coaches: Rob Judson; Anthony Beane; Paris Parham
- Home arena: Doug Collins Court at Redbird Arena

2011–12 Missouri Valley Conference men's basketball standings
	Conf.				Overall
Team	W		L	PCT	W		L	PCT
No. 16 Wichita State	16	–	2	.889	27	–	5	.844
No. 19 Creighton †	14	–	4	.778	28	–	5	.848
Evansville	9	–	9	.500	16	–	16	.500
Illinois State	9	–	9	.500	21	–	14	.600
Northern Iowa	9	–	9	.500	20	–	14	.588
Missouri State	9	–	9	.500	16	–	16	.500
Drake	9	–	9	.500	18	–	16	.529
Indiana State	8	–	10	.444	18	–	15	.545
Southern Illinois	5	–	13	.278	8	–	23	.258
Bradley	2	–	16	.111	7	–	25	.219
† 2012 MVC tournament winner As of March 19, 2012; Rankings from AP Poll

The 2011–12 Illinois State Redbirds men's basketball team represented Illinois State University during the 2011–12 NCAA Division I men's basketball season. The Redbirds, led by fifth year head coach Tim Jankovich, played their home games at Doug Collins Court at Redbird Arena and were a member of the Missouri Valley Conference.

The Redbirds finished the season 21–14, 9–9 in conference play to finish in a five-way tie for third place. They were the number four seed for the Missouri Valley Conference tournament. They won their quarterfinal game versus the University of Northern Iowa and their semifinal game versus Wichita State University but lost their final game versus Creighton University.

The Redbirds received an at-large bid to the 2012 National Invitation Tournament and were assigned the number seven seed in the University of Arizona regional. They were victorious over the University of Mississippi in the first round but were defeated by Stanford University in the second round.

== Roster ==
2011–12 Illinois State Redbirds men's basketball team
Players
Coaches

Pos.	#	Name	Height	Weight	Year	Hometown
G	3	Trey Blue	6 ft 3 in (1.91 m)	200 lb (91 kg)	Jr	Chicago, IL
G	1	Tyler Brown	6 ft 4 in (1.93 m)	185 lb (84 kg)	Jr	Owensboro, KY
F	32	Jackie Carmichael	6 ft 9 in (2.06 m)	240 lb (109 kg)	Jr	Manhattan, KS
G	4	Darious Clark	6 ft 3 in (1.91 m)	208 lb (94 kg)	Jr	Clinton, MD
G	5	Anthony Cousin	5 ft 11 in (1.8 m)	185 lb (84 kg)	Jr	Anchorage, AK
G	13	John Wilkins	6 ft 9 in (2.06 m)	225 lb (102 kg)	Jr	Antibes, France
F	22	Jon Ekey	6 ft 7 in (2.01 m)	215 lb (98 kg)	RS So	Independence, MO
G	3	Zeke Upshaw	6 ft 6 in (1.98 m)	215 lb (98 kg)	RS So	Chicago, IL
G	2	Bryant Allen	6 ft 0 in (1.83 m)	180 lb (82 kg)	So	Maplewood, MO
C	42	Jordan Threloff	6 ft 10 in (2.08 m)	255 lb (116 kg)	RS Fr	DeKalb, IL
G	44	Johnny Hill	6 ft 3 in (1.91 m)	170 lb (77 kg)	Fr	Glendale Heights, IL
F	10	John Jones (I)	6 ft 9 in (2.06 m)	260 lb (118 kg)	Fr	Saint Michael, Barbados
G	11	Nic Moore	5 ft 9 in (1.75 m)	170 lb (77 kg)	Fr	Winona Lake, IN
G	15	Nick Zeisloft (redshirt)	6 ft 4 in (1.93 m)	185 lb (84 kg)	Fr	LaGrange, IL

Head coach

- Tim Jankovich (Kansas State)

Assistant coach(es)

- Rob Judson (Illinois)
- Anthony Beane (Kansas State)
- Paris Parham (Minnesota State)

Legend

- (C) Team captain
- (S) Suspended
- (I) Ineligible
- (W) Walk-on
- Injured
- Current redshirt

== Schedule ==
Date time, TV	Rank^{#}	Opponent^{#}	Result	Record	High points	High rebounds	High assists	Site (attendance) city, state
Exhibition Season
November 6, 2011*; 2:05 pm		Quincy	W 102–63		16 – Ekey	–	–	Doug Collins Court at Redbird Arena; Normal, IL
Regular Season
November 11, 2011*; 9:00 pm		at Fresno State	L 47–55	0–1	13 – Moore	9 – Carmichael	4 – Moore	Save Mart Center at Fresno State (7,041); Fresno, CA
November 17, 2011*; 7:05 pm		Southern Illinois–Edwardsville; Cancún Challenge [Campus Site]	W 68–38	1–1	16 – Carmichael	13 – Carmichael	3 – Carmichael, Ekey	Doug Collins Court at Redbird Arena (3,403); Normal, IL
November 19, 2011*; 4:05 pm		Lipscomb; Cancún Challenge [Campus Site]	W 78–70	2–1	19 – Brown	9 – Carmichael	6 – Moore	Doug Collins Court at Redbird Arena (3,841); Normal, IL
November 22, 2011*; 6:00 pm, CBSSN		vs. Rutgers; Cancún Challenge {Riviera Division} [Semifinal]	W 76–70	3–1	21 – Wilkins	10 – Wilkins	4 – Brown	Moon Palace Arena (800); Cancún, Mexico
November 23, 2011*; 8:30 pm, CBSSN		vs. Illinois; Cancún Challenge {Riviera Division} [Final]	L 59–63	3–2	17 – Carmichael	7 – Wilkins	8 – Cousin	Moon Palace Arena (952); Cancún, Mexico
November 27, 2011; 2:05 pm		Bethune–Cookman	W 75–51	4–2	21 – Carmichael	6 – Carmichael	7 – Moore	Doug Collins Court at Redbird Arena (3,287); Normal, IL
November 30, 2011; 7:05 pm		Chicago State	W 85–41	5–2	19 – Ekey	8 – Carmichael	7 – Moore	Doug Collins Court at Redbird Arena (3,858); Normal, IL
December 3, 2011; 7:05 pm		North Carolina–Wilmington	L 54–63	5–3	15 – Carmichael	13 – Carmichael	5 – Cousin	Doug Collins Court at Redbird Arena (5,157); Normal, IL
December 7, 2011*; 6:00 pm, CSN		at Morehead State	W 78–73	6–3	17 – Carmichael, Ekey	10 – Carmichael	6 – Brown	Ellis T. Johnson Arena (1,656); Morehead, KY
December 18, 2011*; 4:05 pm		Norfolk State	W 68–36	7–3	20 – Carmichael	13 – Threloff	5 – Cousin	Doug Collins Court at Redbird Arena (3,320); Normal, IL
December 20, 2011*; 6:05 pm		Arkansas–Little Rock	W 72–65	8–3	23 – Brown	9 – Carmichael	3 – Cousin	Doug Collins Court at Redbird Arena (3,193); Normal, IL
December 29, 2011; 7:05 pm		Northern Iowa	W 65–61	9–3 (1–0)	19 – Carmichael	13 – Ekey	4 – Moore	Doug Collins Court at Redbird Arena (5,265); Normal, IL
January 1, 2012; 2:00 pm, CSN/FSN		at Southern Illinois	L 71–86	9–4 (1–1)	15 – Brown	13 – Ekey	3 – Cousin, Moore	SIU Arena (2,686); Carbondale, IL
January 4, 2012; 7:05 pm		at Missouri State	W 68–60	10–4 (2–1)	15 – Wilkins	12 – Ekey	6 – Moore	JQH Arena (6,124); Springfield, MO
January 7, 2012; 1:05 pm		Evansville	W 75–73	11–4 (3–1)	17 – Carmichael	8 – Threloff	3 – Moore	Doug Collins Court at Redbird Arena (5,333); Normal, IL
January 10, 2012; 7:05 pm		at Wichita State	L 62–65	11–5 (3–2)	23 – Moore	13 – Carmichael	2 – Moore	Charles Koch Arena (10,078); Wichita, KS
January 13, 2012; 8:00 pm, ESPN3		No. 23 Creighton	L 78–87	11–6 (3–3)	29 – Allen	5 – Brown	3 – Brown, Allen, Moore	Doug Collins Court at Redbird Arena (8,771); Normal, IL
January 15, 2012; 7:05 pm, CSN		at Drake	L 60–77	11–7 (3–4)	12 – Moore	8 – Carmichael	4 – Moore	The Knapp Center (3,410); Des Moines, IA
January 18, 2012; 7:00 pm, CSN/FSN		Indiana State	W 67–54	12–7 (4–4)	24 – Brown	11 – Carmichael, Wilkins	5 – Moore	Doug Collins Court at Redbird Arena (4,189); Normal, IL
January 21, 2012; 7:05 pm, CSN		at Evansville	L 71–79	12–8 (4–5)	17 – Moore	9 – Carmichael	6 – Moore	Ford Center (6,187); Evansville, IN
January 25, 2012; 6:05 pm		Missouri State	W 76–69 ^{OT}	13–8 (5–5)	26 – Carmichael	16 – Carmichael	5 – Brown	Doug Collins Court at Redbird Arena (4,311); Normal, IL
January 28, 2012; 3:05 pm, CSN		Southern Illinois	W 60–40	14–8 (6–5)	19 – Carmichael	11 – Carmichael, Wilkins	4 – Brown	Doug Collins Court at Redbird Arena (6,268); Normal, IL
February 1, 2012; 7:05 pm		at No. 13 Creighton	L 74–102	14–9 (6–6)	21 – Brown	6 – Carmichael	4 – Brown, Moore	Qwest Center Omaha (17,311); Omaha, NE
February 4, 2012; 4:35 pm, CSN		Bradley	W 78–48	15–9 (7–6)	21 – Brown	8 – Carmichael	8 – Moore	Doug Collins Court at Redbird Arena (7,744); Normal, IL
February 8, 2012; 7:05 pm		Drake	W 64–53	16–9 (8–6)	26 – Brown	20 – Carmichael	5 – Brown	Doug Collins Court at Redbird Arena (4,196); Normal, IL
February 11, 2012; 7:00 pm, CSN		at Northern Iowa	L 63–78	16–10 (8–7)	17 – Allen	13 – Carmichael	5 – Moore	McLeod Center (5,323); Cedar Falls, IA
February 14, 2012; 6:05 pm, CSN		at Indiana State	L 77-83 ^{OT}	16–11 (8–8)	16 – Moore	7 – Wilkins	7 – Moore	Hulman Center (4,963); Terre Haute, IN
February 18, 2012*; 4:05 pm		Oakland; Sears BracketBusters	W 79–75	17–11	25 – Carmichael	19 – Carmichael	4 – Cousin	Doug Collins Court at Redbird Arena (4,601); Normal, IL
February 22, 2012; 7:05 pm		No. 19 Wichita State	L 55–68	17–12 (8–9)	17 – Allen	8 – Wilkins	4 – Moore	Doug Collins Court at Redbird Arena (4,573); Normal, IL
February 25, 2012; 1:00 pm		at Bradley	W 54–53	18–12 (9–9)	16 – Carmichael	14 – Carmichael	2 – Brown, Cousin, Moore	Carver Arena (10,584); Peoria, IL
State Farm Missouri Valley Conference {MVC} Tournament
March 2, 2012; 2:35 pm, CSN/FSN	(4)	vs. (5) Northern Iowa; Quarterfinal	W 54–42	19–12	16 – Carmichael	15 – Carmichael	2 – Carmichael	Scottrade Center (11,348); St. Louis, MO
March 3, 2012; 1:35 pm, CSN/FSN	(4)	vs. (1) No. 15 Wichita State; Semifinal	W 65–64	20–12	25 – Brown	11 – Carmichael	3 – Moore	Scottrade Center (16,271); St. Louis, MO
March 4, 2012; 1:05 pm, CBS	(4)	vs. (2) No. 25 Creighton; Final	L 79–83 ^{OT}	20–13	20 – Moore	9 – Carmichael	5 – Moore	Scottrade Center (12,380); St. Louis, MO
National Invitation {NIT} Tournament
March 14, 2012*; 8:30 pm, ESPNU	(7)	at (2) Mississippi; Arizona Regional [First Round]	W 96–93 ^{OT}	21–13	26 – Brown	10 – Carmichael	10 – Moore	C. M. "Tad" Smith Coliseum (3,010); Oxford, MS
March 19, 2012*; 10:30 pm, ESPN2	(7)	at (3) Stanford; Arizona Regional [Second Round]	L 88–92 ^{OT}	21–14	25 – Moore	12 – Carmichael	2 – Cousin, Wilkins, Allen, Moore	Maples Pavilion (1,781); Stanford, CA
*Non-conference game. ^{#}Rankings from AP Poll. (#) Tournament seedings in parentheses. All times are in Central Standard Time.
