= 2011–12 Wichita State Shockers men's basketball team =

American college basketball season

2011–12 Wichita State Shockers men's basketball

Missouri Valley Conference regular season Champions

NCAA Tournament, Round of 64
- Conference: Missouri Valley Conference

Ranking
- AP: No. 18
- Record: 27–6 (16–2 MVC)
- Head coach: Gregg Marshall
- Assistant coaches: Chris Jans; Greg Heiar; Dana Ford
- Home arena: Charles Koch Arena (10,506)

2011–12 Missouri Valley Conference men's basketball standings
| | Conf. | | | | Overall |
| Team | W | | L | PCT | W | | L | PCT |
|---|---|---|---|---|---|---|---|---|
| No. 16 Wichita State | 16 | – | 2 | .889 | 27 | – | 5 | .844 |
| No. 19 Creighton † | 14 | – | 4 | .778 | 28 | – | 5 | .848 |
| Evansville | 9 | – | 9 | .500 | 16 | – | 16 | .500 |
| Illinois State | 9 | – | 9 | .500 | 21 | – | 14 | .600 |
| Northern Iowa | 9 | – | 9 | .500 | 20 | – | 14 | .588 |
| Missouri State | 9 | – | 9 | .500 | 16 | – | 16 | .500 |
| Drake | 9 | – | 9 | .500 | 18 | – | 16 | .529 |
| Indiana State | 8 | – | 10 | .444 | 18 | – | 15 | .545 |
| Southern Illinois | 5 | – | 13 | .278 | 8 | – | 23 | .258 |
| Bradley | 2 | – | 16 | .111 | 7 | – | 25 | .219 |
† 2012 MVC tournament winner As of March 19, 2012; Rankings from AP Poll

The 2011–12 Wichita State Shockers men's basketball team represented Wichita State University in the 2011–12 NCAA Division I men's basketball season. The team, played in the Missouri Valley Conference, and were led by fifth-year head coach Gregg Marshall. The Shockers played their home games at Charles Koch Arena. They finished with a 16–2 conference record to be crowned Missouri Valley Conference regular season champions. In the 2012 Missouri Valley Conference Tournament, they beat Indiana State in the quarterfinals before losing to Illinois State in the semifinals. They received an at-large bid to the 2012 NCAA Division I men's basketball tournament for their first NCAA Tournament appearance since 2006 and earned No. 5 seed in the South Region where they were defeated by VCU in the second round to end the season with 27–6 record.

== Roster ==
2011–12 Wichita State Shockers men's basketball team
Players
Coaches

| Pos. | # | Name | Height | Weight | Year | Previous school | Hometown |
|---|---|---|---|---|---|---|---|
| G | 1 | Joe Ragland | 6 ft 0 in (1.83 m) | 185 lb (84 kg) | Sr | West Springfield; North Platte CC | West Springfield, MA |
| G | 2 | Malcolm Armstead | 6 ft 0 in (1.83 m) | 205 lb (93 kg) | Sr | Central Park Christian; Chipola JC | Florence, AL |
| G | 3 | Evan Wessel | 6 ft 5 in (1.96 m) | 203 lb (92 kg) | Fr | Wichita Heights | Wichita, KS |
| F | 5 | James Anacreon | 6 ft 7 in (2.01 m) | 205 lb (93 kg) | Jr | Frances Lewis; Lake Land CC (IL) | Queens, NY |
| G | 5 | Demetric Williams | 6 ft 2 in (1.88 m) | 177 lb (80 kg) | Jr | Cheyenne | Las Vegas, NV |
| G | 10 | Joe Mitchell | 6 ft 1 in (1.85 m) | 193 lb (88 kg) | Jr | Wichita Southeast; Hutchinson CC | Wichita, KS |
| F | 15 | Randall Vautravers | 6 ft 6 in (1.98 m) | 185 lb (84 kg) | RS Fr | Andover Central | Andover, KS |
| F | 20 | Ben Smith | 6 ft 5 in (1.96 m) | 209 lb (95 kg) | Sr | Oklahoma City Southeast; Northern Oklahoma–Enid | Oklahoma City, OK |
| C | 21 | Ehimen Orukpe | 7 ft 0 in (2.13 m) | 251 lb (114 kg) | Jr | Lifeline Educational Center; Three Rivers CC (MO) | Lagos, Nigeria |
| F | 22 | Carl Hall | 6 ft 8 in (2.03 m) | 233 lb (106 kg) | Jr | NW Florida State | Cochran, GA |
| G | 23 | Toure' Murry | 6 ft 5 in (1.96 m) | 199 lb (90 kg) | Sr | Klein Forest | Houston, TX |
| G | 24 | David Kyles | 6 ft 4 in (1.93 m) | 185 lb (84 kg) | Sr | Kimball | Dallas, TX |
| G | 31 | Ron Baker (redshirt) | 6 ft 3 in (1.91 m) | 209 lb (95 kg) | Fr | Scott City | Scott City, KS |
| G | 32 | Tekele Cotton | 6 ft 2 in (1.88 m) | 203 lb (92 kg) | Fr | Whitefield Academy | Smyrna, GA |
| C | 41 | Garrett Stutz | 7 ft 0 in (2.13 m) | 255 lb (116 kg) | Sr | North Kansas City | Kansas City, MO |
| F | 50 | Jake White | 6 ft 8 in (2.03 m) | 218 lb (99 kg) | Fr | Chaska | Chaska, MN |

Head coach

- Gregg Marshall (Randolph–Macon)

Assistant coach(es)

- Chris Jans (Loras)
- Dana Ford (Illinois State)
- Greg Heiar (Franciscan)

Legend

- (C) Team captain
- (S) Suspended
- (I) Ineligible
- (W) Walk-on
- Injured
- Current redshirt

Roster

== Preseason ==
The team plays their home games at the Charles Koch Arena, which has a capacity of 10,506. They are in their 67th season as a member of the Missouri Valley Conference. Coming back from their 2010–11 season, they compiled a record of 29–8 and are 2011 National Invitation Tournament Champions.

=== Departures ===
| Name | Number | Pos. | Height | Weight | Year | Hometown | Notes |
|---|---|---|---|---|---|---|---|
| Aaron Ellis | 0 | PF | 6'9" | 208 | Senior | Myrtle Beach, South Carolina | Graduated |
| Jerome Hamilton | 4 | PF | 6'7" | 220 | Freshman | Warwick, Georgia | Transferred Connors State |
| Graham Hatch | 14 | G/F | 6'4" | 206 | Senior | Mesa, Arizona | Graduated |
| Tyler Richardson | 22 | G/F | 6'4" | 207 | Freshman | Huntsville, Alabama | Transferred North Alabama |
| J. T. Durley | 31 | PF | 6'8" | 236 | Senior | Pittsburg, Texas | Graduated |
| Gabe Blair | 32 | PF | 6'8" | 235 | Senior | Gastonia, North Carolina | Graduated |

=== Class of 2011 Recruits ===
College recruiting information
| Name | Hometown | School | Height | Weight | Commit date |
|---|---|---|---|---|---|
| Jake White; SF | Chaska, MN | Chaska | 6 ft 7 in (2.01 m) | 215 lb (98 kg) | Jan 10, 2010 |
| Jake White; SF | Recruit ratings: (89) | | | | |
| Evan Wessel; PG | Wichita, KS | Wichita Heights | 6 ft 4 in (1.93 m) | 190 lb (86 kg) | May 24, 2010 |
| Evan Wessel; PG | Recruit ratings: Scout: (83) | | | | |
| Tekele Cotton; SG | Smyrna, GA | Whitefield Academy | 6 ft 1 in (1.85 m) | 165 lb (75 kg) | Sep 30, 2010 |
| Tekele Cotton; SG | Recruit ratings: (83) | | | | |
| Ron Baker; SG | Scott City, KS | Scott City High School | 6 ft 3 in (1.91 m) | 195 lb (88 kg) | May 30, 2011 |
| Ron Baker; SG | Recruit ratings: (40) | | | | |
| Ede Egharevba; SF | Queens, NY | Evelyn Mack Academy | 6 ft 6 in (1.98 m) | 180 lb (82 kg) | May 30, 2011 |
| Ede Egharevba; SF | Recruit ratings: (40) | | | | |
| Carl Hall; C | Cochran, GA | Northwest Florida State College | 6 ft 8 in (2.03 m) | 215 lb (98 kg) | Nov 10, 2010 |
| Carl Hall; C | Recruit ratings: No ratings found | | | | |
| James Anacreon; PF | Queens, NY | Lake Land College | 6 ft 7 in (2.01 m) | 205 lb (93 kg) | Aug 7, 2011 |
| James Anacreon; PF | Recruit ratings: No ratings found | | | | |
Overall recruit ranking:
Note: In many cases, Scout, Rivals, 247Sports, On3, and ESPN may conflict in their listings of height and weight.; In these cases, the average was taken. ESPN grades are on a 100-point scale.; Sources: "2011 Wichita State Basketball Commits". Rivals.; "2011 Wichita State Basketball Commits". Scout.; "2011 Wichita State Basketball Commits". ESPN.; "Scout.com Team Recruiting Rankings". Scout.; "2011 Team Ranking". Rivals.

== Schedule ==
| Date time, TV | Rank^{#} | Opponent^{#} | Result | Record | Site (attendance) city, state |
Exhibition
| November 8, 2011*; 7:05 pm | | Emporia State | W 82–43 | | Charles Koch Arena (9,862); Wichita, KS |
Regular Season
| November 13, 2010*; 3:05 pm | | Charleston Southern | W 85–57 | 1–0 | Charles Koch Arena (10,181); Wichita, KS |
| November 17, 2011*; 7:00 pm, ESPNU | | vs. Colorado; Puerto Rico Tip-Off Quarterfinals | W 67–58 | 2–0 | José Miguel Agrelot Coliseum (5,322); San Juan, PR |
| November 18, 2011*; 8:00 pm, ESPN2 | | vs. No. 16 Alabama; Puerto Rico Tip-Off semifinals | L 60–70 | 2–1 | José Miguel Agrelot Coliseum (6,375); San Juan, PR |
| November 20, 2011*; 4:30 pm, ESPN2 | | vs. Temple; Puerto Rico Tip-Off 3rd place game | L 74–78 ^{OT} | 2–2 | José Miguel Agrelot Coliseum (6,183); San Juan, PR |
| November 25, 2011*; 7:05 pm | | vs. UAB | W 68–46 | 3–2 | Intrust Bank Arena (11,204); Wichita, KS |
| December 1, 2011*; 7:05 pm, Cox KS 22 | | Cal State Fullerton | W 75–60 | 4–2 | Charles Kock Arena (10,269); Wichita, KS |
| December 4, 2011*; 3:05 pm | | No. 18 UNLV; MVC-MWC Challenge | W 89–70 | 5–2 | Charles Kock Arena (10,466); Wichita, KS |
| December 7, 2011*; 7:00 pm, Cox KS 22 | | at Tulsa | W 77–67 | 6–2 | Reynolds Center (4,360); Tulsa, OK |
| December 10, 2011*; 7:05 pm | | Utah State | W 83–76 | 7–2 | Charles Koch Arena (10,386); Wichita, KS |
| December 14, 2011*; 7:05 pm | | Chicago State | W 94–44 | 8–2 | Charles Koch Arena (10,203); Wichita, KS |
| December 19, 2011*; 7:05 pm | | Newman | W 102–53 | 9–2 | Charles Koch Arena (10,187); Wichita, KS |
| December 28, 2011; 7:00 pm | | at Bradley | W 90–51 | 10–2 (1–0) | Carver Arena (7,184); Peoria, IL |
| December 31, 2011; 5:00 pm, ESPNU | | No. 21 Creighton | L 61–68 | 10–3 (1–1) | Charles Koch Arena (10,317); Wichita, KS |
| January 4, 2012; 7:05 pm | | at Evansville | W 67–66 | 11–3 (2–1) | Ford Center (3,916); Evansville, IN |
| January 7, 2012; 2:05 pm | | at Southern Illinois | W 83–73 | 12–3 (3–1) | SIU Arena (4,004); Carbondale, IL |
| January 10, 2012; 7:05 pm | | Illinois State | W 65–62 | 13–3 (4–1) | Charles Koch Arena (10,078); Wichita, KS |
| January 13, 2012; 7:05 pm | | Bradley | W 78–41 | 14–3 (5–1) | Charles Koch Arena (10,335); Wichita, KS |
| January 15, 2012; 7:05 pm, ESPNU | | at Indiana State | W 75–65 | 15–3 (6–1) | Hulman Center (6,410); Terre Haute, IN |
| January 18, 2012; 8:00 pm | | at Northern Iowa | W 71–68 | 16–3 (7–1) | McLeod Center (4,690); Cedar Falls, IA |
| January 21, 2012; 7:05 pm | | Southern Illinois | W 85–42 | 17–3 (8–1) | Charles Koch Arena (10,298); Wichita, KS |
| January 25, 2012; 7:00 pm | | Evansville | W 85–74 | 18–3 (9–1) | Charles Koch Arena (10,219); Wichita, KS |
| January 28, 2012; 8:00 pm, MVC-TV | | at Drake | L 86–92 ^{3OT} | 18–4 (9–2) | Knapp Center (6,027); Des Moines, IA |
| February 1, 2012; 7:05 pm | | at Missouri State | W 74–67 | 19–4 (10–2) | JQH Arena (7,666); Springfield, MO |
| February 4, 2012; 9:00 pm, ESPN2 | | Indiana State | W 71–66 | 20–4 (11–2) | Charles Koch Arena (10,329); Wichita, KS |
| February 8, 2012; 7:00 pm, MVC-TV | | Northern Iowa | W 82–57 | 21–4 (12–2) | Charles Koch Arena (10,241); Wichita, KS |
| February 11, 2012; 4:00 pm, ESPN2 | | at No. 17 Creighton | W 89–68 | 22–4 (13–2) | CenturyLink Center (16,772); Omaha, NE |
| February 15, 2012; 7:05 pm | No. 24 | Missouri State | W 73–58 | 23–4 (14–2) | Charles Koch Arena (10,506); Wichita, KS |
| February 18, 2012*; 11:00 am, ESPN2 | No. 24 | at Davidson; ESPN BracketBusters | W 91–74 | 24–4 | John M. Belk Arena (5,223); Davidson, NC |
| February 22, 2012; 7:05 pm, Cox KS 22 | No. 19 | at Illinois State | W 68–55 | 25–4 (15–2) | Redbird Arena (7,111); Normal, IL |
| February 25, 2012; 12:30 pm, MVC-TV | No. 19 | Drake | W 81–58 | 26–4 (16–2) | Charles Koch Arena (10,375); Wichita, KS |
State Farm MVC Tournament
| March 2, 2012; 12:00 pm, MVC-TV | No. 15 | vs. Indiana State; Quarterfinals | W 72–48 | 27–4 | Scottrade Center (11,348); St. Louis, MO |
| March 3, 2012; 1:30 pm, MVC-TV | No. 15 | vs. Illinois State; Semifinals | L 64–65 | 27–5 | Scottrade Center (16,271); St. Louis, MO |
NCAA Tournament
| March 15, 2012*; 6:15 pm, CBS | No. (S 5) | (S 12) VCU; Second Round | L 59–62 | 27–6 | Rose Garden (17,519); Portland, OR |
*Non-conference game. ^{#}Rankings from AP Poll. (#) Tournament seedings in parentheses. All times are in Central Time (#) during NCAA Tournament is seed with Region.

== Rankings ==
| Poll | Pre | Wk 1 | Wk 2 | Wk 3 | Wk 4 | Wk 5 | Wk 6 | Wk 7 | Wk 8 | Wk 9 | Wk 10 | Wk 11 | Wk 12 | Wk 13 | Wk 14 | Wk 15 | Wk 16 | Wk 17 | Wk 18 | Final |
|---|---|---|---|---|---|---|---|---|---|---|---|---|---|---|---|---|---|---|---|---|
| AP | NR | NR | NR | NR | NR | NR | RV | RV | NR | NR | RV | RV | 24 | 19 | 15 | 16 | | | | |
| Coaches | NR | RV | NR | NR | NR | NR | NR | RV | NR | RV | RV | RV | RV | 19 | 14 | 16 | | | | |
