= 2011–12 Creighton Bluejays men's basketball team =

American college basketball season

2011–12 Creighton Bluejays men's basketball
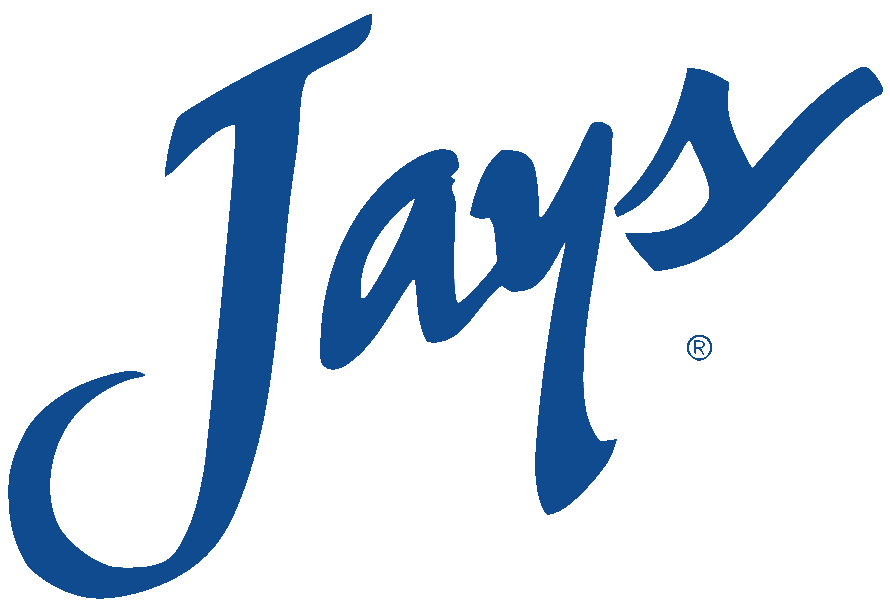

Missouri Valley tournament champions

NCAA Tournament, Third Round
- Conference: Missouri Valley Conference

Ranking
- Coaches: No. 21
- AP: No. 19
- Record: 29–6 (14–4 MVC)
- Head coach: Greg McDermott (2nd year)
- Assistant coaches: Darian DeVries (14th year); Steve Lutz (2nd year); Steve Merfeld (2nd year)
- Home arena: CenturyLink Center Omaha

2011–12 Missouri Valley Conference men's basketball standings
| | Conf. | | | | Overall |
| Team | W | | L | PCT | W | | L | PCT |
|---|---|---|---|---|---|---|---|---|
| No. 16 Wichita State | 16 | – | 2 | .889 | 27 | – | 5 | .844 |
| No. 19 Creighton † | 14 | – | 4 | .778 | 28 | – | 5 | .848 |
| Evansville | 9 | – | 9 | .500 | 16 | – | 16 | .500 |
| Illinois State | 9 | – | 9 | .500 | 21 | – | 14 | .600 |
| Northern Iowa | 9 | – | 9 | .500 | 20 | – | 14 | .588 |
| Missouri State | 9 | – | 9 | .500 | 16 | – | 16 | .500 |
| Drake | 9 | – | 9 | .500 | 18 | – | 16 | .529 |
| Indiana State | 8 | – | 10 | .444 | 18 | – | 15 | .545 |
| Southern Illinois | 5 | – | 13 | .278 | 8 | – | 23 | .258 |
| Bradley | 2 | – | 16 | .111 | 7 | – | 25 | .219 |
† 2012 MVC tournament winner As of March 19, 2012; Rankings from AP Poll

The 2011–12 Creighton Bluejays men's basketball team represented Creighton University during the 2011–12 NCAA Division I men's basketball season. The Bluejays, led by second year head coach Greg McDermott, played their home games at the CenturyLink Center Omaha (renamed from Qwest Center Omaha in the 2011 offseason) and are members of the Missouri Valley Conference. The conference season ended with 14–4 record, finishing in 2nd place, behind Wichita State. They finished the season 29–6, 14–4 in MVC play to finish in second place. They were champions of the Missouri Valley Basketball tournament to earn the conference's automatic bid into the 2012 NCAA tournament where they defeated Alabama in the first round before falling in the second round to North Carolina.

== Offseason ==
=== Departures ===
| Name | Number | Pos. | Height | Weight | Year | Hometown | Notes |
|---|---|---|---|---|---|---|---|
| Kaleb Korver | 15 | G | 6'5" | 195 | Senior | Pella, IA | Graduated |
| Wayne Runnels | 23 | F | 6'6" | 215 | Senior | Watonga, OK | Graduated |
| Darryl Ashford | 24 | G/F | 6'4" | 210 | Senior | Houston, TX | Graduated |
| Kenny Lawson Jr. | 25 | C | 6'9" | 250 | Senior | Oceanside, CA | Graduated |
| Casey Harriman | 32 | F | 6'5" | 220 | Senior | Ida Grove, IA | Graduated |

=== 2011 recruiting class ===
College recruiting information
| Name | Hometown | School | Height | Weight | Commit date |
|---|---|---|---|---|---|
| Avery Dingman; SF | Branson, MO | Ames | 6 ft 6 in (1.98 m) | 215 lb (98 kg) | May 1, 2011 |
| Avery Dingman; SF | Recruit ratings: Scout: Rivals: 247Sports: | | | | |
Overall recruit ranking:
Note: In many cases, Scout, Rivals, 247Sports, On3, and ESPN may conflict in their listings of height and weight.; In these cases, the average was taken. ESPN grades are on a 100-point scale.; Sources: "2011 Team Ranking". Rivals.

== Roster ==
2011–12 Creighton Bluejays men's basketball team
Players
Coaches

| Pos. | # | Name | Height | Weight | Year | Previous school | Hometown |
|---|---|---|---|---|---|---|---|
| G | 00 | Gregory Echenique | 6 ft 9 in (2.06 m) | 270 lb (122 kg) | Jr | St. Benedict's Preparatory School; Rutgers | Guatire, Venezuela |
| G | 1 | Austin Chatman | 6 ft 0 in (1.83 m) | 170 lb (77 kg) | Fr | The Colony | The Colony, TX |
| G | 2 | Taylor Stormberg | 6 ft 0 in (1.83 m) | 190 lb (86 kg) | RS So | Creighton Prep | Omaha, NE |
| F | 3 | Doug McDermott | 6 ft 7 in (2.01 m) | 210 lb (95 kg) | So | Ames | Ames, IA |
| F | 4 | Alex Olson (redshirt) | 6 ft 6 in (1.98 m) | 210 lb (95 kg) | Fr | Abraham Lincoln | Council Bluffs, IA |
| G | 5 | Josh Jones | 6 ft 2 in (1.88 m) | 195 lb (88 kg) | Jr | Central | Omaha, NE |
| G | 10 | Grant Gibbs | 6 ft 4 in (1.93 m) | 215 lb (98 kg) | Jr | Linn-Mar High School; Gonzaga | Marion, IA |
| G/F | 11 | Derek Sebastian | 6 ft 5 in (1.96 m) | 200 lb (91 kg) | Sr | Thompson Valley | Loveland, CO |
| G/F | 12 | Jahenns Manigat | 6 ft 1 in (1.85 m) | 175 lb (79 kg) | So | Regional Elite Development Academy | Ottawa, Ontario |
| G | 13 | Ross Ferrarini (W) | 6 ft 3 in (1.91 m) | 195 lb (88 kg) | Jr | Westside | Omaha, NE |
| F | 20 | Matthew Dorwart | 6 ft 8 in (2.03 m) | 200 lb (91 kg) | Sr | Sidney | Sidney, NE |
| G | 22 | Avery Dingman | 6 ft 6 in (1.98 m) | 215 lb (98 kg) | Fr | Branson | Branson, MO |
| C | 23 | Geoffrey Groselle (redshirt) | 7 ft 0 in (2.13 m) | 240 lb (109 kg) | Fr | Plano West | Plano, TX |
| G/F | 24 | Nevin Johnson (redshirt) | 6 ft 5 in (1.96 m) | 200 lb (91 kg) | Fr | Spring | Houston, TX |
| G | 30 | Antoine Young | 6 ft 0 in (1.83 m) | 180 lb (82 kg) | Sr | Bellevue West | Bellevue, NE |
| C | 31 | Will Artino | 6 ft 11 in (2.11 m) | 230 lb (104 kg) | RS Fr | Waukee | Waukee, IA |
| F | 34 | Ethan Wragge | 6 ft 7 in (2.01 m) | 220 lb (100 kg) | So | Eden Prairie | Eden Prairie, MN |
| F | 50 | Mogboluwaga Oginni (redshirt) | 6 ft 8 in (2.03 m) | 215 lb (98 kg) | Fr | Saint Louis University | St. Louis, MO |

Head coach

- Greg McDermott (Northern Iowa)

Assistant coach(es)

- Darian DeVries (Northern Iowa)
- Steve Lutz (Texas Lutheran)
- Steve Merfeld (UW–La Crosse)

Legend

- (C) Team captain
- (S) Suspended
- (I) Ineligible
- (W) Walk-on
- Injured
- Current redshirt

Roster
Last update: 6/1/2021

== Rankings ==
Ranking movement Legend: ██ Increase in ranking. ██ Decrease in ranking.
| Poll | Pre | Wk 1 | Wk 2 | Wk 3 | Wk 4 | Wk 5 | Wk 6 | Wk 7 | Wk 8 | Wk 9 | Wk 10 | Wk 11 | Wk 12 | Wk 13 | Wk 14 | Wk 15 | Wk 16 | Wk 17 | Wk 18 | Final |
|---|---|---|---|---|---|---|---|---|---|---|---|---|---|---|---|---|---|---|---|---|
| AP | RV | RV | RV | RV | RV | 19 | 25 | 23 | 21 | RV | 23 | 19 | 15 | 13 | 17 | RV | RV | 25 | 19 | 19 |
| Coaches | RV | RV | RV | 25 | 22 | 17 | 24 | 21 | 19 | 24 | 21 | 18 | 14 | 12 | 15 | RV | RV | 24 | 22 | 20 |

== Schedule ==
| Date time, TV | Rank^{#} | Opponent^{#} | Result | Record | Site (attendance) city, state |
Exhibition
| 11/06/2011*; 2:00 pm | | Rockhurst | W 81–42 | – | CenturyLink Center Omaha (13,533); Omaha, NE |
Regular season
| 11/11/2011*; 7:00 pm | | North Carolina A&T; Dale Howard Classic | W 97–65 | 1–0 | CenturyLink Center Omaha (15,228); Omaha, NE |
| 11/13/2011*; 2:00 pm | | Chicago State; Dale Howard Classic | W 95–61 | 2–0 | CenturyLink Center Omaha (13,908); Omaha, NE |
| 11/16/2011*; 7:00 pm | | at UAB | W 70–60 | 3–0 | Bartow Arena (4,417); Birmingham, AL |
| 11/20/2011*; 3:00 pm, BTN | | vs. Iowa; Dale Howard Classic | W 82–59 | 4–0 | Wells Fargo Arena (12,746); Des Moines, IA |
| 11/25/2011*; 7:00 pm | | Campbell; Dale Howard Classic | W 104–81 | 5–0 | CenturyLink Center Omaha (16,683); Omaha, NE |
| 11/30/2011*; 9:30 pm, The Mtn. | | at San Diego State; MWC–MVC Challenge | W 85–83 | 6–0 | Viejas Arena (12,414); San Diego, CA |
| 12/04/2011*; 4:00 pm, KMTV | | Nebraska; Rivalry | W 76–66 | 7–0 | CenturyLink Center Omaha (16,561); Omaha, NE |
| 12/10/2011*; 11:00 am, KMTV | No. 19 | at Saint Joseph's | L 71–80 | 7–1 | Hagan Arena (4,200); Philadelphia, PA |
| 12/17/2011*; 7:00 pm | No. 25 | Houston Baptist | W 97–62 | 8–1 | CenturyLink Center Omaha (16,513); Omaha, NE |
| 12/19/2011*; 7:00 pm | No. 23 | at Tulsa | W 83–64 | 9–1 | Reynolds Center (4,228); Tulsa, OK |
| 12/22/2011*; 7:00 pm | No. 23 | Northwestern | W 87–79 | 10–1 | CenturyLink Center Omaha (17,676); Omaha, NE |
| 12/28/2011; 7:00 pm, FSN | No. 21 | Missouri State | L 65–77 | 10–2 (0–1) | CenturyLink Center Omaha (17,665); Omaha, NE |
| 12/31/2011; 5:00 pm, ESPNU | No. 21 | at Wichita State | W 68–61 | 11–2 (1–1) | Charles Koch Arena (10,317); Wichita, KS |
| 01/03/2012; 7:00 pm, KMTV | | Drake | W 76–59 | 12–2 (2–1) | CenturyLink Center Omaha (15,390); Omaha, NE |
| 01/07/2012; 7:00 pm, KMTV | | at Bradley | W 92–83 | 13–2 (3–1) | Peoria Civic Center (8,610); Peoria, IL |
| 01/10/2012; 8:00 pm, ESPN3 | No. 23 | Northern Iowa | W 63–60 | 14–2 (4–1) | CenturyLink Center Omaha (16,627); Omaha, NE |
| 01/13/2012; 8:00 pm, ESPN3 | No. 23 | at Illinois State | W 87–78 | 15–2 (5–1) | Redbird Arena (8,771); Normal, IL |
| 01/15/2012; 7:05 pm | No. 23 | at Missouri State | W 66–65 | 16–2 (6–1) | JQH Arena (9,124); Springfield, MO |
| 01/18/2012; 6:00 pm, NET | No. 18 | Southern Illinois | W 90–71 | 17–2 (7–1) | CenturyLink Center Omaha (15,794); Omaha, NE |
| 01/21/2012; 2:00 pm, ESPN2 | No. 18 | Indiana State | W 75–49 | 18–2 (8–1) | CenturyLink Center Omaha (17,411); Omaha, NE |
| 01/25/2012; 7:00 pm, KMTV | No. 15 | at Drake | W 77–69 | 19–2 (9–1) | Knapp Center (6,110); Des Moines, IA |
| 01/28/2012; 7:00 pm, KMTV | No. 15 | Bradley | W 73–59 | 20–2 (10–1) | CenturyLink Center Omaha (18,436); Omaha, NE |
| 02/01/2012; 7:00 pm, NET | No. 13 | Illinois State | W 102–74 | 21–2 (11–1) | CenturyLink Center Omaha (17,311); Omaha, NE |
| 02/04/2012; 4:00 pm, FSN | No. 13 | at Northern Iowa | L 62–65 | 21–3 (11–2) | McLeod Center (6,910); Cedar Falls, IA |
| 02/07/2012; 7:00 pm | No. 17 | at Evansville | L 57–65 | 21–4 (11–3) | Ford Center (5,128); Evansville, IN |
| 02/11/2012; 2:00 pm, ESPN2 | No. 17 | Wichita State | L 68–89 | 21–5 (11–4) | CenturyLink Center Omaha (16,772); Omaha, NE |
| 02/14/2012; 7:00 pm | | at Southern Illinois | W 88–69 | 22–5 (12–4) | SIU Arena (3,408); Carbondale, IL |
| 02/18/2012*; 9:00 pm, ESPN2 | | Long Beach State; Sears BracketBusters | W 81–79 | 23–5 | CenturyLink Center Omaha (16,503); Omaha, NE |
| 02/21/2012; 7:00 pm, FSN | | Evansville | W 93–92 ^{OT} | 24–5 (13–4) | CenturyLink Center Omaha (16,447); Omaha, NE |
| 02/25/2012; 3:00 pm, ESPN2 | | Indiana State | W 61–60 | 25–5 (14–4) | Hulman Center (7,911); Terre Haute, IN |
Missouri Valley Conference Basketball tournament
| 03/02/2012; 6:00 pm, MVCTV | No. 25 | vs. Drake; Quarterfinals | W 68–61 | 26–5 | Scottrade Center (14,412); St. Louis, MO |
| 03/03/2012; 4:30 pm, MVCTV | No. 25 | vs. Evansville; Semifinals | W 99–71 | 27–5 | Scottrade Center (16,271); St. Louis, MO |
| 03/04/2012; 1:00 pm, CBS | No. 25 | vs. Illinois State; Championship Game | W 83–79 ^{OT} | 28–5 | Scottrade Center (12,380); St.Louis, MO |
2012 NCAA tournament
| 03/16/2012*; 1:40 pm, TBS | No. 19 (8) | vs. No. (9) Alabama; Second Round | W 58–57 | 29–5 | Greensboro Coliseum Complex (15,880); Greensboro, North Carolina |
| 03/18/2012*; 4:30 pm, CBS | No. 19 (8) | vs. No. 4 (1) North Carolina; Third Round | L 73–87 | 29–6 | Greensboro Coliseum Complex (18,722); Greensboro, North Carolina |
*Non-conference game. ^{#}Rankings from AP Poll. (#) Tournament seedings in parentheses. All times are in Central Time.
