= 2012 Missouri Valley Conference men's basketball tournament =

- Classification: Division I
- Season: 2011–12
- Teams: 10
- Site: Scottrade Center; St. Louis, Missouri
- Champions: Creighton (11th title)
- Winning coach: Greg McDermott (2nd title)
- MVP: Doug McDermott (Creighton)
- Television: FSN, CBS

2011–12 Missouri Valley Conference men's basketball standings
	Conf.				Overall
Team	W		L	PCT	W		L	PCT
No. 16 Wichita State	16	–	2	.889	27	–	5	.844
No. 19 Creighton †	14	–	4	.778	28	–	5	.848
Evansville	9	–	9	.500	16	–	16	.500
Illinois State	9	–	9	.500	21	–	14	.600
Northern Iowa	9	–	9	.500	20	–	14	.588
Missouri State	9	–	9	.500	16	–	16	.500
Drake	9	–	9	.500	18	–	16	.529
Indiana State	8	–	10	.444	18	–	15	.545
Southern Illinois	5	–	13	.278	8	–	23	.258
Bradley	2	–	16	.111	7	–	25	.219
† 2012 MVC tournament winner As of March 19, 2012; Rankings from AP Poll

The 2012 Missouri Valley Conference men's basketball tournament, popularly referred to as "Arch Madness", as part of the 2011-12 NCAA Division I men's basketball season was played in St. Louis, Missouri March 1–4, 2012 at the Scottrade Center. The championship game was televised live on CBS on Sunday March 4 at 1:05 pm CST. The tournament's winner received the Missouri Valley Conference's automatic bid to the 2012 NCAA tournament.

== Tournament Bracket ==
Opening Round; Thursday, March 1
8	Indiana State	66
9	Southern Illinois	51
7	Drake	65
10	Bradley	49

Quarterfinals; Friday, March 2
1	No. 15 Wichita State	72
8	Indiana State	48
4	Illinois State	54
5	Northern Iowa	42
2	No. 25 Creighton	68
7	Drake	61
3	Evansville	72
6	Missouri State	64

Semifinals; Saturday, March 3
1	No. 15 Wichita State	64
4	Illinois State	65
2	No. 25 Creighton	99
3	Evansville	71

Final; Sunday, March 4
4	Illinois State	79 ^{OT}
2	No. 25 Creighton	83
