= 2011–12 Northern Iowa Panthers men's basketball team =

American college basketball season

2011–12 Northern Iowa Panthers men's basketball

NIT, Second Round
- Conference: Missouri Valley Conference
- Record: 20–14 (9–9 The Valley)
- Head coach: Ben Jacobson (6th season)
- Assistant coaches: Erik Crawford; P.J. Hogan; Ben Johnson
- Home arena: McLeod Center

2011–12 Missouri Valley Conference men's basketball standings
	Conf.				Overall
Team	W		L	PCT	W		L	PCT
No. 16 Wichita State	16	–	2	.889	27	–	5	.844
No. 19 Creighton †	14	–	4	.778	28	–	5	.848
Evansville	9	–	9	.500	16	–	16	.500
Illinois State	9	–	9	.500	21	–	14	.600
Northern Iowa	9	–	9	.500	20	–	14	.588
Missouri State	9	–	9	.500	16	–	16	.500
Drake	9	–	9	.500	18	–	16	.529
Indiana State	8	–	10	.444	18	–	15	.545
Southern Illinois	5	–	13	.278	8	–	23	.258
Bradley	2	–	16	.111	7	–	25	.219
† 2012 MVC tournament winner As of March 19, 2012; Rankings from AP Poll

The 2011–12 Northern Iowa Panthers men's basketball team represented the University of Northern Iowa during the 2011–12 NCAA Division I men's basketball season. The Panthers, led by sixth year head coach Ben Jacobson, played their home games at McLeod Center and are members of the Missouri Valley Conference. They finished the season 20–14, 9–9 in MVC play to finish in a five-way tie for third place. As the 5 seed, they lost in the quarterfinals of the Missouri Valley Basketball tournament to Illinois State. They were invited to the 2012 National Invitation Tournament where they defeated Saint Joseph's in the first round before falling in the second round to Drexel.

== Roster ==
Number	Name	Position	Height	Weight	Year	Hometown
1	Deon Mitchell	Guard	6–1	180	Freshman	Pflugerville, Texas
4	Chip Rank	Forward	6–6	222	Sophomore	Cedarburg, Wisconsin
5	Matt Bohannon	Guard	6–4	190	Freshman	Marion, Iowa
10	Seth Tuttle	Forward	6–8	210	Freshman	Sheffield, Iowa
12	Marvin Singleton	Forward	6–6	235	Freshman	St. Louis Park, Minnesota
13	Johnny Moran	Guard	6–1	190	Senior	Algonquin, Illinois
14	Nate Buss	Forward	6–8	205	Sophomore	Charles City, Iowa
20	Jake Koch	Forward	6–9	245	Junior	Ashwaubenon, Wisconsin
21	Matt Morrison	Guard	6–0	180	Sophomore	Solon, Iowa
23	Marc Sonnen	Guard	6–3	190	Junior	St. Paul, Minnesota
24	Max Martino	Guard	6–5	205	Freshman	Cedar Rapids, Iowa
30	Jevon Lyle	Guard	6–2	175	Freshman	Kansas City, Missouri
31	Chris Olivier	Forward	6–8	245	Freshman	Glenwood, Illinois
33	Austin Pehl	Center	6–10	259	Junior	Cedar Falls, Iowa
34	Tyler Lange	Forward	6–6	220	Sophomore	Sac City, Iowa
52	Anthony James	Guard	6–0	175	Junior	St. Louis, Missouri

== Schedule ==
Date time, TV	Rank^{#}	Opponent^{#}	Result	Record	Site (attendance) city, state
Exhibition
10/30/2011*; 1:00 pm		Northern State	W 71–53		McLeod Center (2,090); Cedar Falls, IA
11/04/2011*; 7:00 pm		Dubuque	W 57–43		McLeod Center (2,890); Cedar Falls, IA
Regular season
11/12/2011*; 6:00 pm		at Old Dominion	W 63–46	1–0	Ted Constant Convocation Center (7,804); Norfolk, VA
11/15/2011*; 1:00 am, ESPN		at Saint Mary's; ESPN College Hoops Tip-Off Marathon	L 41–57	1–1	McKeon Pavilion (2,053); Moraga, CA
11/20/2011*; 5:00 pm		Northern Colorado; South Padre Island Invitational	W 78–69	2–1	McLeod Center (3,890); Cedar Falls, IA
11/22/2011*; 7:00 pm, KWWL		Western Carolina; South Padre Island Invitational	W 59–39	3–1	McLeod Center (3,620); Cedar Falls, IA
11/25/2011*; 5:00 pm		vs. Rice; South Padre Island Invitational semifinals	W 64–60	4–1	South Padre Island Convention Centre (556); South Padre Island, TX
11/26/2011*; 9:00 pm, CBSSN		vs. Providence; South Padre Island Invitational finals	W 79–62	5–1	South Padre Island Convention Centre (700); South Padre Island, TX
11/30/2011*; 7:00 pm, Mediacom		at Iowa State	W 69–62	6–1	Hilton Coliseum (13,509); Ames, IA
12/03/2011*; 1:30 pm		Colorado State; MWC–MVC Challenge	W 83–77	7–1	McLeod Center (4,015); Cedar Falls, IA
12/06/2011*; 7:00 pm, KWWL		Iowa	W 80–60	8–1	McLeod Center (6,834); Cedar Falls, IA
12/10/2011*; 1:00 pm, KWWL		Milwaukee	W 67–51	9–1	McLeod Center (4,067); Cedar Falls, IA
12/19/2011*; 7:00 pm		Loras	W 84–48	10–1	McLeod Center (3,437); Cedar Falls, IA
12/20/2011*; 7:00 pm		Ohio	L 59–76	10–2	McLeod Center (3,486); Cedar Falls, IA
12/29/2011; 7:00 pm		at Illinois State	L 61–65	10–3 (0–1)	Redbird Arena (5,265); Normal, IL
01/01/2012; 8:00 pm, ESPNU		Evansville	L 65–76	10–4 (0–2)	McLeod Center (3,653); Cedar Falls, IA
01/04/2012; 7:00 pm, KWWL		Indiana State	W 65–48	11–4 (1–2)	McLeod Center (3,409); Cedar Falls, IA
01/07/2012; 7:00 pm, Mediacom		at Drake	W 83–68	12–4 (2–2)	Knapp Center (5,876); Des Moines, IA
01/10/2012; 8:00 pm, ESPN3		at No. 23 Creighton	L 60–63	12–5 (2–3)	CenturyLink Center Omaha (16,627); Omaha, NE
01/13/2012; 7:00 pm, MVC TV		Missouri State	W 61–60	13–5 (3–3)	McLeod Center (5,038); Cedar Falls, IA
01/15/2012; 1:00 pm, ESPN3		at Bradley	L 67–78	13–6 (3–4)	Carver Arena (8,223); Peoria, IL
01/18/2012; 7:00 pm, KWWL		Wichita State	L 68–71	13–7 (3–5)	McLeod Center (4,690); Cedar Falls, IA
01/22/2012; 7:00 pm, ESPNU		Drake	W 66–52	14–7 (4–5)	McLeod Center (3,975); Cedar Falls, IA
01/25/2012; 6:00 pm		at Indiana State	L 54–59	14–8 (4–6)	Hulman Center (4,933); Terre Haute, IN
01/28/2012; 4:00 pm, ESPNU		at Missouri State	L 51–63	14–9 (4–7)	JQH Arena (9,376); Springfield, MO
01/31/2012; 7:00 pm, ESPNU		Southern Illinois	W 58–49	15–9 (5–7)	McLeod Center (3,466); Cedar Falls, IA
02/04/2012; 4:00 pm, MVC TV		No. 13 Creighton	W 65–62	16–9 (6–7)	McLeod Center (6,910); Cedar Falls, IA
02/08/2012; 7:00 pm, MVC TV		at Wichita State	L 57–82	16–10 (6–8)	Charles Koch Arena (10,241); Wichita, KS
02/11/2012; 7:00 pm, CSNC		Illinois State	W 78–63	17–10 (7–8)	McLeod Center (5,323); Cedar Falls, IA
02/15/2012; 7:00 pm		at Evansville	L 62–63	17–11 (7–9)	Ford Center (4,177); Evansville, IN
02/18/2012*; 6:00 pm, ESPN2		at VCU; Sears BracketBusters	L 68–77	17–12	Stuart C. Siegel Center (7,617); Richmond, VA
02/22/2012; 7:00 pm		Bradley	W 64–55	18–12 (8–9)	McLeod Center (4,680); Cedar Falls, IA
02/25/2012; 2:00 pm		at Southern Illinois	W 65–61	19–12 (9–9)	SIU Arena (3,427); Carbondale, IL
Missouri Valley Conference tournament
3/02/2012; 6:00 pm, FSN Midwest		vs. Illinois State; Quarterfinals	L 42–54	19–13	Scottrade Center (11,348); St.Louis, MO
2012 NIT
03/14/2012*; 6:15 pm, ESPN3		at Saint Joseph's; First Round	W 67–65	20–13	Hagan Arena (2,851); Philadelphia, PA
03/18/2012*; 10:00 am, ESPN		at Drexel; Second Round	L 63–65	20–14	Daskalakis Athletic Center (1,884); Philadelphia, PA
*Non-conference game. ^{#}Rankings from AP Poll. (#) Tournament seedings in parentheses. All times are in Central Time.
