= 2011–12 Drake Bulldogs men's basketball team =

American college basketball season

2011–12 Drake Bulldogs men's basketball

CIT Second Round vs. Rice, L, 68–74
- Conference: Missouri Valley Conference
- Record: 18–16 (9–9 MVC)
- Head coach: Mark Phelps
- Assistant coaches: Mike Gibson; Stan Johnson; Brett Nelson
- Home arena: Knapp Center

2011–12 Missouri Valley Conference men's basketball standings
	Conf.				Overall
Team	W		L	PCT	W		L	PCT
No. 16 Wichita State	16	–	2	.889	27	–	5	.844
No. 19 Creighton †	14	–	4	.778	28	–	5	.848
Evansville	9	–	9	.500	16	–	16	.500
Illinois State	9	–	9	.500	21	–	14	.600
Northern Iowa	9	–	9	.500	20	–	14	.588
Missouri State	9	–	9	.500	16	–	16	.500
Drake	9	–	9	.500	18	–	16	.529
Indiana State	8	–	10	.444	18	–	15	.545
Southern Illinois	5	–	13	.278	8	–	23	.258
Bradley	2	–	16	.111	7	–	25	.219
† 2012 MVC tournament winner As of March 19, 2012; Rankings from AP Poll

The 2011–12 Drake Bulldogs men's basketball team represented Drake University during the 2011–12 NCAA Division I men's basketball season. The team, which plays in the Missouri Valley Conference (MVC), was led by fourth-year head coach Mark Phelps and played their home games at the Knapp Center.

== Preseason and exhibition ==
Ryan Wedel graduated, but returned as graduate assistant. The Bulldogs replaced two-thirds of their coaching staff. Frank Weisler left the team after suffering a career-ending pre-season injury. Brennen Newton is no longer with the team.

The Bulldogs were picked to finish 7th in the pre-season MVC poll.

Several players suffered pre-season injuries. Seth VanDeest will redshirt the season along with Reece Uhlenhopp who only played one minute against Indiana State. In addition, Rice & Alexander were suspended for the Bulldog's exhibition and first regular season games due to an off-the-court shoplifting incident. As a result of injuries and suspensions, the Bulldogs played their exhibition game versus Quincy with just five scholarship players.

== Regular season ==
After easily defeating Upper Iowa, Drake’s first real test resulted in an impressive win against in-state rival Iowa State. The win significantly raised expectations for the Paradise Jam where the Bulldogs would play Ole Miss, Winthrop, & Virginia. The Bulldogs would lose 2 out those 3 games to finish 6th.

Upon returning to the Knapp Center over Thanksgiving Weekend, the Bulldogs resumed a streak that began at the end of 2010–11: Win at home, lose on the road. The Bulldogs 12-game home winning streak would be snapped on Jan. 7 against in-state rival Northern Iowa. Following the loss, the Bulldogs went on a 4-game winning streak, the longest in 3 seasons which included two road wins.

The week of Jan. 22-Jan. 28 featured what many called the most challenging week of the season. After getting destroyed at Northern Iowa, Drake would put up a nice effort against #15 Creighton but would ultimately fall. The biggest win of the season to date would come Jan. 28 where the Bulldogs won a triple-overtime thriller against Wichita State in a game that lasted over 3 hours. Drake would drop their next contest at Indiana State as a result of poor shooting.

On Feb. 2, team Captain Ben Simons was diagnosed with mononucleosis. With Simons out indefinitely, the Bulldogs would score the lowest points in a home game since 1949 in a 57–39 loss against Missouri State on Feb. 4. A loss at Illinois State would be the third consecutive loss for the Bulldogs. The Bulldogs would capture their largest win since Phelps took over as head coach (2008–09 season) at home against Evansville.

Drake would suffer only its second loss in the annual Bracketbuster contests with a loss against New Mexico State. After winning on senior night, the Bulldogs would fall at Wichita State to close regular season play.

Drake finished the regular season as part of a 5 way tie for third place in the conference. Unfortuantly Drake's two losses against Missouri State would force Drake into playing a Thursday night game to open the 2012 MVC Tournament.

== Post-season ==
After easily defeating Bradley, Drake would face Creighton in the MVC Tournament Semi-Finals. Despite an early 12–3 lead, Creighton would lead at halftime and go on a 15–4 run in the second half. Although the Bulldogs would close the gap to 3 late in the game, Creighton had better free throw shooting at the end of the game to defeat Drake by 7.

Drake accepted a bid to play in the 2012 CollegeInsiders.com Post-Season Tournament. The Bulldogs defeated North Dakota in the first postseason game at the Knapp Center ever for their first non-MVC Tournament postseason win in 37 years. Drake would fall in the second round to Rice, ending their season.

== Roster ==
Note: Flags indicate national team eligibility at FIBA sanctioned events. Players may hold other non-FIBA nationality not displayed.

No.		Position	Player
1	(United States)	F	Jordan Clarke
2	(United States)	F	Aaron Hawley
3	(Canada)	G	Kurt Alexander
4	(United States)	G	Judd Welfringer
10	(United States)	F	Jeremy Jeffers
11	(United States)	G	Karl Madison
14	(United States)	F	Lincoln Vobra
21	(United States)	F	Corey Parker

No.		Position	Player
22	(United States)	F	Kraidon Woods
23	(United States)	G	Mitch McLaughlin
24	(United States)	G	Rayvonte Rice
25	(United States)	G	David Smith
32	(United States)	F	Greg Whitaker
34	(United States)	F	Ben Simons
40	(United States)	F	Reece Uhlenhopp
45	(United States)	C	Seth VanDeest

== Schedule ==
Date time, TV	Rank^{#}	Opponent^{#}	Result	Record	Site (attendance) city, state
Exhibition
11/05/2011*; 11:00 a.m.		Quincy	L 74–84	–	Knapp Center (2,297); Des Moines, IA
Regular season
11/12/2011*; 7:05 p.m.		Upper Iowa	W 83–58	1–0	Knapp Center (3,367); Des Moines, IA
11/15/2011*; 8:00 p.m., Mediacom		Iowa State	W 74–65	2–0	Knapp Center (5,665); Des Moines, IA
11/18/2011*; 2:30 p.m.		vs. Ole Miss; Paradise Jam First Round	L 59–63	2–1	Sports and Fitness Center (1,285); St. Thomas, USVI
11/19/2011*; 5:00 p.m.		vs. Winthrop; Paradise Jam Consolation round	W 66–62	3–1	Sports and Fitness Center (1,677); St. Thomas, USVI
11/21/2011*; 2:30 p.m.		vs. Virginia; Paradise Jam 5th place Game	L 52–60	3–2	Sports and Fitness Center (2,322); St. Thomas, USVI
11/26/2011*; 7:05 p.m., Mediacom		Cal State Northridge	W 73–49	4–2	Knapp Center (2,931); Des Moines, IA
11/30/2011*; 8:00 p.m.		at Boise State	L 64–108	4–3	Taco Bell Arena (3,235); Boise, ID
12/03/2011*; 7:05 p.m., Mediacom		Air Force; MWC–MVC Challenge	W 62–60	5–3	Knapp Center (3,538); Des Moines, IA
12/08/2011*; 8:00 p.m., Mediacom		Eastern Michigan	W 66–53	6–3	Knapp Center (2,898); Des Moines, IA
12/17/2011*; 8:00 p.m., BTN		at Iowa	L 68–82	6–4	Carver-Hawkeye Arena (10,479); Iowa City, IA
12/21/2011*; 7:05 p.m.		Central Arkansas	W 87–64	7–4	Knapp Center (3,751); Des Moines, IA
12/28/2011; 7:05 p.m.		Indiana State	W 79–64	8–4 (1–0)	Knapp Center (4,035); Des Moines, IA
12/31/2011; 2:05 p.m.		at Missouri State	L 61–72	8–5 (1–1)	JQH Arena (6,801); Springfield, MO
01/03/2012; 7:05 p.m., ESPN3		at No. 23 Creighton	L 59–76	8–6 (1–2)	CenturyLink Center Omaha (15,390); Omaha, NE
01/07/12; 7:05 p.m., Mediacom		Northern Iowa	L 68–83	8–7 (1–3)	Knapp Center (5,876); Des Moines, IA
01/10/2012; 7:05 p.m.		Bradley	W 82–74	9–7 (2–3)	Knapp Center (3,807); Des Moines, IA
01/13/2012; 7:05 p.m.		at Evansville	W 69–60	10–7 (3–3)	Roberts Municipal Stadium (4,027); Evansville, IN
01/15/2012; 7:05 p.m., ESPN3		Illinois State	W 77–60	11–7 (4–3)	Knapp Center (3,807); Des Moines, IA
01/18/2012; 7:05 p.m.		at Southern Illinois	W 75–68 ^{OT}	12–7 (5–3)	SIU Arena (3,410); Carbondale, IL
01/22/2012; 7:00 p.m., ESPNU		at Northern Iowa	L 52–66	12–8 (5–4)	McLeod Center (3,975); Cedar Falls, IA
01/25/2012; 7:05 p.m., Mediacom		No. 15 Creighton	L 69–77	12–9 (5–5)	Knapp Center (6,110); Des Moines, IA
01/28/2012; 8:00 p.m., MVC-TV		Wichita State	W 92–86 ^{3OT}	13–9 (6–5)	Knapp Center (6,027); Des Moines, IA
02/01/2012; 7:00 p.m., MVC-TV		at Indiana State	L 54–61	13–10 (6–6)	Hulman Center (5,445); Terre Haute, IN
02/04/2012; 7:05 p.m., Mediacom		Missouri State	L 39–57	13–11 (6–7)	Knapp Center (4,276); Des Moines, IA
02/08/2012; 7:00 p.m.		at Illinois State	L 53–64	13 12 (6–8)	Redbird Arena (4,196); Normal, IL
02/12/2012; 7:00 p.m., ESPNU		Evansville	W 78–54	14–12 (7–8)	Knapp Center (3,477); Des Moines, IA
02/15/2012; 7:05 p.m., MVC-TV		at Bradley	W 62–55	15–12 (8–8)	Carver Arena (7,822); Peoria, IL
02/18/2012*; 2:00 p.m., ESPNU		at New Mexico State; Sears Bracketbusters	L 55–71	15–13	Pan American Center ( 5,119); Las Cruces, NM
02/22/2012; 7:05 p.m., Mediacom		Southern Illinois	W 78–63	16–13 (9–8)	Knapp Center (3,577); Des Moines, IA
02/25/2012; 12:30 p.m., MVC-TV		at No. 19 Wichita State	L 58–81	16–14 (9–9)	Charles Koch Arena (10,375); Wichita, KS
2012 State Farm MVC Tournament
03/01/2012; 8:35 p.m., MVC-TV		vs. Bradley; First Round	W 65–49	17–14	Scottrade Center (7,872); St. Louis, MO
03/02/2012; 6:00 p.m., MVC-TV		vs. No. 25 Creighton; Quarterfinals	L 61–68	17–15	Scottrade Center (14,412); St. Louis, MO
2012 CIT
03/14/2012*; 7:00 p.m.		North Dakota; First Round	W 70–64	18–15	Knapp Center (1,829); Des Moines, IA
03/17/2012*; 7:00 p.m.		at Rice; Second Round	L 68–74	18–16	Tudor Fieldhouse (731); Houston, TX
*Non-conference game. ^{#}Rankings from AP Poll. (#) Tournament seedings in parentheses. All times are in Central Standard Time.

Games listed as MVC-TV broadcast on Fox Sports Midwest, Fox Sports Indiana, Fox Sports Kansas City, Comcast Sportsnet Chicago, ESPN3, and AT&T U-Verse among other local providers.
