= 2011–12 Missouri State Bears basketball team =

American college basketball season

2011–12 Missouri State Bears men's basketball
- Conference: Missouri Valley Conference
- Record: 16–16 (9–9 The Valley)
- Head coach: Paul Lusk (1st season)
- Assistant coaches: Patrick Baldwin; Steve Woodberry; Kyle Smithpeters
- Home arena: JQH Arena

2011–12 Missouri Valley Conference men's basketball standings
	Conf.				Overall
Team	W		L	PCT	W		L	PCT
No. 16 Wichita State	16	–	2	.889	27	–	5	.844
No. 19 Creighton †	14	–	4	.778	28	–	5	.848
Evansville	9	–	9	.500	16	–	16	.500
Illinois State	9	–	9	.500	21	–	14	.600
Northern Iowa	9	–	9	.500	20	–	14	.588
Missouri State	9	–	9	.500	16	–	16	.500
Drake	9	–	9	.500	18	–	16	.529
Indiana State	8	–	10	.444	18	–	15	.545
Southern Illinois	5	–	13	.278	8	–	23	.258
Bradley	2	–	16	.111	7	–	25	.219
† 2012 MVC tournament winner As of March 19, 2012; Rankings from AP Poll

The 2011–12 Missouri State Bears basketball team represented Missouri State University during the 2011–12 NCAA Division I men's basketball season. The Bears, led by first year head coach Paul Lusk, played their home games at JQH Arena and are members of the Missouri Valley Conference. They finished the season 16–16, 9–9 in Missouri Valley play. As the six seed, the Bears lost in the quarterfinals of the Missouri Valley Basketball tournament to Evansville.

== Roster ==
Number	Name	Position	Height	Weight	Year	Hometown
0	Anthony Downing	Guard	6–0	178	Junior	Atchison, Kansas
1	Keith Pickens	Guard/Forward	6–4	191	Sophomore	St. Louis, Missouri
5	Jarmar Gulley	Guard/Forward	6–4	225	Junior	Beaumont, Texas
10	Tomie Aromona	Guard	5–10	161	Freshman	Kansas City, Missouri
15	Drew Wilson	Forward	6–7	212	Freshman	Tulsa, Oklahoma
21	Caleb Petterson	Center	6–11	256	Senior	Ames, Oklahoma
23	Dorrian Williams	Guard	6–1	195	Freshman	Oklahoma City, Oklahoma
30	Nathan Scheer	Guard/Forward	6–4	203	Sophomore	Washington, Missouri
33	Corey Copeland	Guard	6–4	182	Sophomore	Fort Smith, Arkansas
34	Kyle Weems	Forward	6–6	226	Senior	Topeka, Kansas
35	Corbin Thomas	Forward	6–6	220	Junior	Chicago, Illinois
42	Christian Kirk	Forward	6–7	204	Freshman	Springfield, Missouri
50	Isaiah Rhine	Center	6–10	242	Senior	Versailles, Missouri

== Schedule ==
Date time, TV	Rank^{#}	Opponent^{#}	Result	Record	Site (attendance) city, state
Exhibition
10/27/2011*; 8:00 pm		Truman State	W 99–68		JQH Arena (2,241); Springfield, MO
10/29/2011*; 7:00 pm		William Jewell	W 90–49		JQH Arena (3,125); Springfield, MO
11/05/2011*; 7:00 pm		at Missouri Southern; I–44 Challenge	W 84–48		The Leggett and Platt Athletic Center (2,977); Joplin, MO
Regular season
11/11/2011*; 9:00 pm, KYTV		at Nevada	W 68–46	1–0	Lawlor Events Center (4,285); Reno, NV
11/15/2011*; 7:00 pm, K15CZ		at Arkansas State	W 77–46	2–0	Convocation Center (2,353); Jonesboro, AR
11/19/2011*; 7:00 pm		Emporia State	W 71–45	3–0	JQH Arena (7,089); Springfield, MO
11/26/2011*; 7:00 pm		Tulsa	W 69–64 ^{OT}	4–0	JQH Arena (7,163); Springfield, MO
11/30/2011*; 7:00 pm, K15CZ		at Oral Roberts	L 63–68	4–1	Mabee Center (3,352); Tulsa, OK
12/03/2011*; 9:00 pm, The Mtn.		at New Mexico; MWC – MVC Challenge	L 60–76	4–2	The Pit (14,077); Albuquerque, NM
12/07/2011*; 8:00 pm, ESPNU		Oklahoma State	L 67–72	4–3	JQH Arena (6,461); Springfield, MO
12/10/2011*; 4:30 pm, KYTV		at Arkansas–Little Rock	W 68–60	5–3	Jack Stephens Center (2,545); Little Rock, AR
12/17/2011*; 2:00 pm		Kennesaw State; Las Vegas Classic	W 78–55	6–3	JQH Arena (5,425); Springfield, MO
12/19/2011*; 7:00 pm		Texas A&M–Corpus Christi; Las Vegas Classic	W 66–53	7–3	JQH Arena (5,002); Springfield, MO
12/22/2011*; 7:00 pm, ESPN3		vs. West Virginia; Las Vegas Classic	L 68–70 ^{OT}	7–4	Orleans Arena (NA); Paradise, NV
12/23/2011*; 10:30 pm, ESPN3		vs. Saint Mary's; Las Vegas Classic	L 61–77	7–5	Orleans Arena (NA); Las Vegas, NV
12/28/2011; 7:00 pm, FSMW		at No. 21 Creighton	W 77–65	8–5 (1–0)	CenturyLink Center Omaha (17,665); Omaha, NE
12/31/2011; 2:00 pm		Drake	L 65–76	9–5 (2–0)	JQH Arena (6,801); Springfield, MO
01/04/2012; 7:00 pm		Illinois State	L 60–68	9–6 (2–1)	JQH Arena (6,124); Springfield, MO
01/07/2012; 12:00 pm, K15CZ		at Indiana State	W 69–63	10–6 (3–1)	Hulman Center (5,327); Terre Haute, IN
01/10/2012; 7:00 pm		Southern Illinois	W 77–65	11–6 (4–1)	JQH Arena (6,009); Springfield, MO
01/13/2012; 7:00 pm, FSMW		at Northern Iowa	L 60–61	11–7 (4–2)	McLeod Center (5,038); Cedar Falls, IA
01/15/2012; 2:00 pm		Evansville	L 82–87 ^{OT}	11–8 (4–3)	JQH Arena (7,654); Springfield, MO
01/18/2012; 7:00 pm		No. 23 Creighton	L 65–66	11–9 (4–4)	JQH Arena (9,124); Springfield, MO
01/21/2012; 7:00 pm, KYTV		at Bradley	W 51–48	12–9 (5–4)	Carver Arena (8,605); Peoria, IL
01/25/2012; 6:00 pm, K15CZ		at Illinois State	L 69–76 ^{OT}	12–10 (5–5)	Redbird Arena (4,311); Normal, IL
01/28/2012; 4:00 pm, ESPNU		Northern Iowa	W 63–51	13–10 (6–5)	JQH Arena (9,376); Springfield, MO
02/01/2012; 7:00 pm		Wichita State	L 67–74	13–11 (6–6)	JQH Arena (7,666); Springfield, MO
02/04/2012; 7:00 pm, K15CZ		at Drake	W 57–39	14–11 (7–6)	Knapp Center (4,276); Des Moines, IA
02/08/2012; 7:00 pm, ESPN3		at Southern Illinois	W 56–54	15–11 (8–6)	SIU Arena (3,137); Carbondale, IL
02/12/2012; 2:00 pm, FSMW		Bradley	W 64–53	16–11 (9–6)	JQH Arena (6,461); Springfield, MO
02/15/2012; 7:00 pm, KYTV		at No. 24 Wichita State	L 58–73	16–12 (9–7)	Charles Koch Arena (10,506); Wichita, KS
02/18/2012*; 4:00 pm, ESPNU		Old Dominion; ESPN BracketBusters	L 67–73	16–13	JQH Arena (6,344); Springfield, MO
02/22/2012; 7:00 pm		Indiana State	L 46–59	16–14 (9–8)	JQH Arena (6,911); Springfield, MO
02/25/2012; 1:00 pm		at Evansville	L 70–75 ^{OT}	16–15 (9–9)	Ford Center (6,421); Evansville, IN
Missouri Valley Conference tournament
03/02/2012; 8:35 pm, MVC-TV		vs. Evansville; Quarterfinals	L 64–72	16–16	Scottrade Center (14,412); St.Louis, MO
*Non-conference game. ^{#}Rankings from AP Poll. (#) Tournament seedings in parentheses. All times are in Central Time.
