= 2011–12 Evansville Purple Aces men's basketball team =

American college basketball season

2011–12 Evansville Purple Aces men's basketball

CBI, First Round
- Conference: Missouri Valley Conference
- Record: 16–16 (9–9 Missouri Valley)
- Head coach: Marty Simmons
- Assistant coaches: Jimmy Elgas; Carson Harris; Chris Hollender
- Home arena: Ford Center

2011–12 Missouri Valley Conference men's basketball standings
	Conf.				Overall
Team	W		L	PCT	W		L	PCT
No. 16 Wichita State	16	–	2	.889	27	–	5	.844
No. 19 Creighton †	14	–	4	.778	28	–	5	.848
Evansville	9	–	9	.500	16	–	16	.500
Illinois State	9	–	9	.500	21	–	14	.600
Northern Iowa	9	–	9	.500	20	–	14	.588
Missouri State	9	–	9	.500	16	–	16	.500
Drake	9	–	9	.500	18	–	16	.529
Indiana State	8	–	10	.444	18	–	15	.545
Southern Illinois	5	–	13	.278	8	–	23	.258
Bradley	2	–	16	.111	7	–	25	.219
† 2012 MVC tournament winner As of March 19, 2012; Rankings from AP Poll

The 2011–12 Evansville Purple Aces men's basketball team represented the University of Evansville in the 2011–12 NCAA Division I men's basketball season. Their head coach was Marty Simmons and they played their home games at the Ford Center. They are members of the Missouri Valley Conference. The Purple Aces participated in the 2012 College Basketball Invitational, losing in the first round.

== Previous season ==
The Purple Aces recorded a 15–14 mark overall in the previous season, including a 9–9 conference record. Led by guard Colt Ryan, the team claimed a win against eventual national runner-up Butler. They were invited to the 2011 College Basketball Invitational where they lost in the quarterfinals.

== Roster ==
This season, they return three starters and their top four scorers, including Colt Ryan. The team features three seniors and five juniors on the roster. However, the only returning front court player taller than 6'6" is Matt Peeler who saw very limited minutes in prior seasons.

2011–12 Evansville Purple Aces men's basketball team
Players
Coaches

Pos.	#	Name	Height	Weight	Year	Hometown
F	0	Ryan Sawvell	6 ft 8 in (2.03 m)	200 lb (91 kg)	Fr	Mundelein, IL
G	1	Jordan Nelson	6 ft 0 in (1.83 m)	160 lb (73 kg)	Fr	Lincoln, IL
F/C	3	Matt Peeler	6 ft 8 in (2.03 m)	240 lb (109 kg)	Sr	Alamogordo, NM
G/F	4	Lewis Jones	6 ft 3 in (1.91 m)	205 lb (93 kg)	Jr	Memphis, TN
G	5	Troy Taylor	6 ft 0 in (1.83 m)	184 lb (83 kg)	Jr	Anderson, IN
F/C	10	Jaylon Moore	6 ft 7 in (2.01 m)	230 lb (104 kg)	Fr	Olive Branch, MS
G/F	11	Colt Ryan	6 ft 5 in (1.96 m)	210 lb (95 kg)	Jr	Batesville, IN
G/F	13	Jordan Jahr	6 ft 6 in (1.98 m)	205 lb (93 kg)	So	Austin, TX
G	14	Andy Chinn	6 ft 0 in (1.83 m)	165 lb (75 kg)	Jr	Tell City, IN
G	20	Brandon Williams	6 ft 0 in (1.83 m)	170 lb (77 kg)	Sr	Charlotte, TN
G	22	Ned Cox	6 ft 1 in (1.85 m)	185 lb (84 kg)	Jr	San Antonio, TX
F/C	25	Rokas Cesnulevicius	6 ft 8 in (2.03 m)	215 lb (98 kg)	Fr	Alytaus, LT
G/F	32	Kenneth Harris	6 ft 6 in (1.98 m)	185 lb (84 kg)	Sr	Saint Louis, MO
G/F	34	Denver Holmes	6 ft 4 in (1.93 m)	180 lb (82 kg)	Sr	Olathe, KS

Head coach

- Marty Simmons (Evansville)

Assistant coach(es)

- Jimmy Elgas (Illinois State)
- Carson Harris (Manchester (IN))
- Chris Hollender (Evansville)

Legend

- (C) Team captain
- (S) Suspended
- (I) Ineligible
- (W) Walk-on
- Injured
- Current redshirt

Roster
Last update: 2011-10-30

== Schedule ==
Date time, TV	Rank^{#}	Opponent^{#}	Result	Record	Site (attendance) city, state
Exhibition
October 29, 2011*; 4:05 pm		DePauw	W 81–52	—	Ford Center (3,846); Evansville, IN
November 4, 2011*; 7:05 pm		Illinois–Springfield	W 74–61	–	Ford Center (3,774); Evansville, IN
Regular season
November 12, 2011*; 2:05 pm		Butler	W 80–77 ^{OT}	1–0	Ford Center (9,454); Evansville, IN
November 16, 2011*; 7:00 pm, ESPN3		Indiana	L 73–94	1–1	Ford Center (9,640); Evansville, IN
November 19, 2011*; 2:05 pm		Oakland City	W 80–53	2–1	Ford Center (3,481); Evansville, IN
November 23, 2011*; 7:00 pm		at UIC	L 75–79	2–2	UIC Pavilion (1,987); Chicago, IL
November 29, 2011*; 7:35 pm		Alabama State	W 62–55	3–2	Ford Center (3,462); Evansville, IN
December 3, 2011*; 7:05 pm		TCU; MWC–MVC Challenge	L 68–70 ^{OT}	3–3	Ford Center (5,198); Evansville, IN
December 6, 2011*; 6:00 pm, ESPNU		at No. 6 North Carolina	L 48–97	3–4	Dean E. Smith Center (15,623); Chapel Hill, NC
December 10, 2011*; 7:05 pm		North Carolina A&T	W 86–65	4–4	Ford Center (3,527); Evansville, IN
December 17, 2011*; 1:05 pm		Tennessee Tech	L 70–72	4–5	Ford Center (4,235); Evansville, IN
December 20, 2011*; 6:00 pm		at Miami (OH)	W 77–75	5–5	Millett Hall (1,565); Oxford, OH
December 29, 2011; 7:00 pm, MVC TV		Southern Illinois	W 78–60	6–5 (1–0)	Ford Center (6,105); Evansville, IN
January 1, 2012; 8:00 pm, ESPNU		at Northern Iowa	W 76–65	7–5 (2–0)	McLeod Center (3,653); Cedar Falls, IA
January 4, 2012; 7:05 pm		Wichita State	L 66–67	7–6 (2–1)	Ford Center (3,916); Evansville, IN
January 7, 2012; 1:05 pm		at Illinois State	L 73–75	7–7 (2–2)	Redbird Arena (5,333); Normal, IL
January 10, 2012; 6:05 pm		at Indiana State	L 78–80	7–8 (2–3)	Hulman Center (6,790); Terre Haute, IN
January 13, 2012; 7:05 pm		Drake	L 60–69	7–9 (2–4)	Ford Center (4,027); Evansville, IN
January 15, 2012; 2:05 pm		at Missouri State	W 87–82 ^{OT}	8–9 (3–4)	JQH Arena (7,654); Springfield, MO
January 18, 2012; 7:05 pm		Bradley	W 90–67	9–9 (4–4)	Ford Center (3,478); Evansville, IN
January 21, 2012; 7:05 pm		Illinois State	W 79–71	10–9 (5–4)	Ford Center (6,187); Evansville, IN
January 25, 2012; 7:00 pm, MVC TV		at Wichita State	L 74–86	10–10 (5–5)	Charles Koch Arena (10,219); Wichita, KS
January 29, 2012; 7:00 pm, ESPNU		Indiana State	L 81–90 ^{2OT}	10–11 (5–6)	Ford Center (5,836); Evansville, IN
February 1, 2012; 7:00 pm		at Bradley	W 92–62	11–11 (6–6)	Carver Arena (7,638); Peoria, IL
February 4, 2012; 2:05 pm		at Southern Illinois	L 52–53	11–12 (6–7)	SIU Arena (3,378); Carbondale, IL
February 7, 2012; 7:05 pm		No. 17 Creighton	W 65–57	12–12 (7–7)	Ford Center (5,128); Evansville, IN
February 12, 2012; 7:00 pm, ESPNU		at Drake	L 54–78	12–18 (8–8)	Knapp Center (3,477); Des Moines, IA
February 15, 2012; 7:05 pm		Northern Iowa	W 63–62	13–13 (8–8)	Ford Center (4,177); Evansville, IN
February 18, 2012*; 7:05 pm		Western Illinois; Sears BracketBusters	W 68–45	14–13	Ford Center (5,147); Evansville, IN
February 21, 2012; 7:00 pm, MVC TV		at Creighton	L 92–93 ^{OT}	14–14 (8–9)	Qwest Center Omaha (16,447); Omaha, NE
February 25, 2012; 1:05 pm		Missouri State	W 75–70 ^{OT}	15–14 (9–9)	Ford Center (6,421); Evansville, IN
Missouri Valley tournament
March 2, 2012; 8:35 pm, MVC TV	(3)	vs. (6) Missouri State; Quarterfinals	W 72–64	16–14	Scottrade Center (14,412); Saint Louis, MO
March 3, 2012; 4:05 pm, MVC TV	(3)	vs. (2) No. 25 Creighton; Semifinals	L 71–99	16–15	Scottrade Center (16,271); Saint Louis, MO
CBI
March 13, 2012*; 7:00 pm, HDNet		Princeton; First Round	L 86–95	16–16	Ford Center (3,012); Evansville, IN
*Non-conference game. ^{#}Rankings from AP Poll. (#) Tournament seedings in parentheses. All times are in Central Standard Time.
