= 2011–12 Indiana State Sycamores men's basketball team =

American college basketball season

2011–12 Indiana State Sycamores men's basketball

CIT, First Round
- Conference: Missouri Valley Conference
- Record: 18–15 (8–10 The Valley)
- Head coach: Greg Lansing (2nd season)
- Assistant coaches: Lou Gudino; Marcus Belcher; David Ragland
- Home arena: Hulman Center

2011–12 Missouri Valley Conference men's basketball standings
	Conf.				Overall
Team	W		L	PCT	W		L	PCT
No. 16 Wichita State	16	–	2	.889	27	–	5	.844
No. 19 Creighton †	14	–	4	.778	28	–	5	.848
Evansville	9	–	9	.500	16	–	16	.500
Illinois State	9	–	9	.500	21	–	14	.600
Northern Iowa	9	–	9	.500	20	–	14	.588
Missouri State	9	–	9	.500	16	–	16	.500
Drake	9	–	9	.500	18	–	16	.529
Indiana State	8	–	10	.444	18	–	15	.545
Southern Illinois	5	–	13	.278	8	–	23	.258
Bradley	2	–	16	.111	7	–	25	.219
† 2012 MVC tournament winner As of March 19, 2012; Rankings from AP Poll

The 2011–12 Indiana State Sycamores men's basketball team represented Indiana State University during the 2011–12 NCAA Division I men's basketball season. The Sycamores, led by second year head coach Greg Lansing, played their home games at the Hulman Center and are members of the Missouri Valley Conference. They finished the season 18–15, 8–10 in MVC play to finish in eighth place. The lost in the quarterfinals of the Missouri Valley Basketball tournament to Wichita State. They were invited to the 2012 CollegeInsider.com Tournament where they lost in the first round to Robert Morris.

== Roster ==
Number	Name	Position	Height	Weight	Year	Hometown
0	Jake Kitchell	Forward	6–10	225	Freshman	Union Mills, Indiana
1	Koang Doluony	Forward	6–8	195	Junior	Omaha, Nebraska
2	Lucas Eitel	Guard	6–2	185	Sophomore	Marshall, Illinois
3	Mangiston Arop	Forward	6–6	208	Freshman	Edmonton, Alberta
11	Devonte Brown	Center	6–8	210	Freshman	Killeen, Texas
13	Jake Odum	Guard	6–4	170	Sophomore	Terre Haute, Indiana
15	Carl Richard	Guard/Forward	6–5	215	Senior	Chicago, Illinois
20	Dwayne Lathan	Guard	6–3	205	Senior	Chatham, Louisiana
22	Brandon Burnett	Guard	6–6	225	Freshman	Tucson, Arizona
24	Jordan Printy	Guard	6–4	185	Senior	Marion, Iowa
25	Steve McWhorter	Guard	6–2	185	Sophomore	Racine, Wisconsin
31	RJ Mahurin	Forward	6–8	210	Sophomore	Rockville, Indiana
34	Myles Walker	Center	6–8	250	Senior	San Antonio, Texas

== Schedule ==
Date time, TV	Rank^{#}	Opponent^{#}	Result	Record	Site (attendance) city, state
Exhibition
11/05/2011*; 12:00 pm		Truman State	W 87–33		Hulman Center; Terre Haute, IN
Regular season
11/11/2011*; 5:00 pm		Eastern Illinois	W 79–72	1–0	Hulman Center (5,706); Terre Haute, IN
11/14/2011*; 8:00 pm		at Louisiana–Monroe	W 71–59	2–0	Fant–Ewing Coliseum (1,236); Monroe, LA
11/18/2011*; 5:00 pm		Ball State	W 57–50	3–0	Hulman Center (5,773); Terre Haute, IN
11/21/2011*; 7:00 pm		Green Bay	W 57–56	4–0	Hulman Center (4,761); Terre Haute, IN
11/24/2011*; 12:00 pm, ESPN2		vs. Texas Tech; Old Spice Classic First Round	W 60–49	5–0	HP Field House (NA); Lake Buena Vista, FL
11/25/2011*; 12:00 pm, ESPN		vs. Minnesota; Old Spice Classic Semifinals	L 69–76	5–1	HP Field House (NA); Lake Buena Vista, FL
11/27/2011*; 4:30 pm, ESPN2		vs. Fairfield; Old Spice Classic 3rd Place Game	W 72–66	6–1	HP Field House (NA); Lake Buena Vista, FL
12/03/2011*; 10:00 pm		at Boise State; Mountain West–Missouri Valley Challenge	L 65–74	6–2	Taco Bell Arena (5,342); Boise, ID
12/10/2011*; 1:00 pm, WAWV		Maryville	W 68–57	7–2	Hulman Center (4,929); Terre Haute, IN
12/17/2011*; 5:30 pm, ESPN3		at No. 25 Vanderbilt	W 61–55	8–2	Memorial Gymnasium (13,310); Nashville, TN
12/21/2011*; 7:00 pm, WTWO		Louisiana–Monroe	W 50–35	9–2	Hulman Center (5,167); Terre Haute, IN
12/28/2011; 8:00 pm		at Drake	L 64–79	9–3 (0–1)	Knapp Center (4,035); Des Moines, IA
12/31/2011; 1:00 pm, WTWO		Bradley	W 77–66	10–3 (1–1)	Hulman Center (5,224); Terre Haute, IN
01/04/2012; 8:00 pm		at Northern Iowa	L 48–65	10–4 (1–2)	McLeod Center (3,409); Cedar Falls, IA
01/07/2012; 1:00 pm, WTWO		Missouri State	L 63–69	10–5 (1–3)	Hulman Center (5,327); Terre Haute, IN
01/10/2012; 7:00 pm, WTWO		Evansville	W 80–78	11–5 (2–3)	Hulman Center (6,790); Terre Haute, IN
01/13/2012; 8:00 pm, WTWO		at Southern Illinois	L 67–73	11–6 (2–4)	SIU Arena (3,151); Carbondale, IL
01/15/2012; 8:00 pm, ESPNU		Wichita State	L 65–75	11–7 (2–5)	Hulman Center (6,410); Terre Haute, IN
01/18/2012; 8:00 pm, MVC-TV		at Illinois State	L 54–67	11–8 (2–6)	Redbird Arena (4,189); Normal, IL
01/21/2012; 3:00 pm, ESPN2		at No. 18 Creighton	L 49–75	11–9 (2–7)	CenturyLink Center Omaha (17,411); Omaha, NE
01/25/2012; 7:00 pm, WTWO		Northern Iowa	W 59–54	12–9 (3–7)	Hulman Center (4,933); Terre Haute, IN
01/29/2012; 8:00 pm, ESPNU		at Evansville	W 90–81 ^{2OT}	13–9 (4–7)	Ford Center (5,836); Evansville, IN
02/01/2012; 8:00 pm, MVC-TV		Drake	W 61–54	14–9 (5–7)	Hulman Center (5,445); Terre Haute, IN
02/04/2012; 10:00 pm, ESPN2		at Wichita State	L 66–71	14–10 (5–8)	Charles Koch Arena (10,468); Wichita, KS
02/08/2012; 8:00 pm		at Bradley	L 60–68	14–11 (5–9)	Peoria Civic Center (7,520); Peoria, IL
02/11/2012; 1:00 pm, WTWO		Southern Illinois	W 78–68	15–11 (6–9)	Hulman Center (6,040); Terre Haute, IN
02/14/2012; 7:00 pm, CSN Chicago		Illinois State	W 83–77 ^{OT}	16–11 (7–9)	Hulman Center (4,963); Terre Haute, IN
02/18/2012*; 2:00 pm, WAWV		at Butler	L 54–75	16–12	Hinkle Fieldhouse (10,000); Indianapolis, IN
02/22/2012; 8:00 pm		at Missouri State	W 59–46	17–12 (8–9)	JQH Arena (6,911); Springfield, MO
02/25/2012; 4:00 pm, ESPN2		Creighton	L 60–61	17–13 (8–10)	Hulman Center (7,911); Terre Haute, IN
Missouri Valley Conference tournament
03/01/2012; 6:00 pm, MVC TV		vs. Southern Illinois; First Round	W 66–51	18–13	Scottrade Center (7,872); St.Louis, MO
03/02/2012; 12:00 pm, MVC TV		vs. No. 15 Wichita State; Quarterfinals	L 48–72	18–14	Scottrade Center (11,348); St.Louis, MO
2012 CIT
03/13/2012*; 7:00 pm		Robert Morris; First Round	L 60–67	18–15	Hulman Center (2,113); Terre Haute, IN
*Non-conference game. ^{#}Rankings from AP Poll. (#) Tournament seedings in parentheses. All times are in Eastern Time.
