= 2011–12 Western Kentucky Hilltoppers basketball team =

American college basketball season

2011–12 Western Kentucky Hilltoppers basketball

Sun Belt Tournament champion

NCAA Tournament, Round of 64
- Conference: Sun Belt Conference
- East Division
- Record: 16–19 (7–9 Sun Belt)
- Head coach: Ken McDonald first 16 games; Ray Harper remainder of season
- Assistant coaches: Lawrence Brenneman; Jake Morton; Kip Wellman
- Home arena: E. A. Diddle Arena

2011–12 Sun Belt Conference men's basketball standings
	Conf.				Overall
Team	W		L	PCT	W		L	PCT
East
Middle Tennessee	14	–	2	.875	27	–	7	.794
South Alabama	8	–	8	.500	17	–	12	.586
Florida Atlantic	7	–	9	.438	11	–	19	.367
Western Kentucky†	7	–	9	.438	16	–	19	.457
Troy	5	–	11	.313	10	–	18	.357
Florida International	5	–	11	.313	8	–	21	.276
West
Arkansas–Little Rock	12	–	4	.750	15	–	16	.484
Denver	11	–	5	.688	22	–	9	.710
Louisiana–Lafayette	10	–	6	.625	16	–	16	.500
North Texas	9	–	7	.563	18	–	14	.563
Arkansas State	6	–	10	.375	14	–	20	.412
*Louisiana–Monroe	2	–	14	.125	3	–	26	.103
† 2012 Sun Belt Tournament winner As of March 21, 2012; Rankings from AP Poll; *Ineligible for conference tournament

The 2011–12 Western Kentucky Hilltoppers men's basketball team represented Western Kentucky University during the 2011–12 NCAA Division I men's basketball season. The Hilltoppers were led by fourth year head coach Ken McDonald for the first 16 games of the season before he was fired and were then led by former assistant and new head coach Ray Harper for the remainder of the year. They played their home games at E. A. Diddle Arena and are members of the East Division of the Sun Belt Conference. They finished the season 16–19, 7–9 in Sun Belt Play to finish in a tie for third place in the East Division. The Hilltoppers were champions of the Sun Belt Basketball tournament to earn the conference's automatic bid into the 2012 NCAA tournament. It was their 22nd tournament appearance and first since 2009. WKU was also the first sub-.500 team to make the NCAA Tournament since Coppin State in 2008. They defeated Mississippi Valley State in the First Four round before falling in the second round to eventual national champion Kentucky. Derrick Gordon made the All-Conference Team; Gordon and Kahil McDonald were selected to the SBC Tournament Team, and George Fant was tournament MVP.

== Roster ==
Number	Name	Position	Height	Weight	Year	Hometown
0	Kene Anyigbo	Forward	6–5	250	Sophomore	Bellaire, Texas
1	Kevin Kaspar	Guard	6–0	172	Freshman	Istanbul, Turkey
3	Kahlil McDonald	Guard	6–3	200	Senior	Brooklyn, New York
5	Derrick Gordon	Guard	6–3	185	Freshman	Plainfield, New Jersey
10	Caden Dickerson	Forward	6–4	200	Junior	Argyle, Texas
11	Spence Sheldon	Guard	5–11	165	Freshman	Bowling Green, Kentucky
14	Jamal Crook	Guard	6–3	175	Junior	Louisville, Kentucky
15	O'Karo Akamune	Forward	6–6	205	Sophomore	Miami, Florida
21	Nigel Snipes	Forward	6–5	205	Freshman	Marietta, Georgia
22	Teeng Akol	Forward	6–11	217	Junior	Wian, Sudan
24	Stephon Drane	Forward	6–7	228	Sophomore	Raleigh, North Carolina
25	Jay Starks	Guard	6–3	187	Junior	Scottsville, Kentucky
41	Vinny Zollo	Forward	6–8	240	Freshman	Winchester, Kentucky
44	George Fant	Forward	6–5	245	Freshman	Bowling Green, Kentucky
52	T. J. Price	Guard	6–3	220	Freshman	Slidell, Louisiana

== Schedule ==
Date time, TV	Rank^{#}	Opponent^{#}	Result	Record	Site (attendance) city, state
Exhibition
11/05/2011*; 7:30 pm		Xavier (LA)	W 73–61		E. A. Diddle Arena; Bowling Green, KY
Regular Season
11/11/2011*; 7:00 pm, FCS		Saint Joseph's	L 61–72	0–1	E. A. Diddle Arena (3,813); Bowling Green, KY
11/14/2011*; 7:00 pm		Tennessee State	W 52–49	1–1	E. A. Diddle Arena (3,372); Bowling Green, KY
11/17/2011*; 11:30 pm, ESPN3		vs. Tulsa; Charleston Classic First Round	L 49–65	1–2	TD Arena (2,532); Charleston, SC
11/18/2011*; 12:00 pm, ESPN3		vs. LSU; Charleston Classic Consolation round	L 57–76	1–3	TD Arena (1,711); Charleston, SC
11/20/2011*; 11:00 pm, ESPN3		vs. VCU; Charleston Classic 7th place Game	L 64–69	1–4	TD Arena (2,455); Charleston, SC
11/23/2011*; 7:00 pm, FCS		VCU	L 45–68	1–5	E. A. Diddle Arena (3,285); Bowling Green, KY
11/26/2011*; 7:00 pm		Southeastern Louisiana	W 72–67	2–5	E. A. Diddle Arena (2,714); Bowling Green, KY
12/01/2011*; 7:00 pm, FCS		Murray State	L 59–70	2–6	E. A. Diddle Arena (3,845); Bowling Green, KY
12/04/2011*; 2:00 pm, FCS		Bowling Green	W 60–53	3–6	E. A. Diddle Arena (3,119); Bowling Green, KY
12/07/2011*; 7:00 pm, FCS		at Southern Illinois	W 62–55	4–6	SIU Arena (3,012); Carbondale, IL
12/10/2011*; 6:00 pm, FCS		at IUPUI	L 76–84	4–7	The Jungle (1,135); Indianapolis, IN
12/17/2011*; 7:00 pm, FCS		Furman; BB&T Classic	L 63–76	4–8	E. A. Diddle Arena (3,192); Bowling Green, KY
12/23/2011*; 6:00 pm, ESPN2		at No. 4 Louisville	L 60–70 ^{Vacated}	4–9	KFC Yum! Center (22,150); Louisville, KY
12/29/2011; 7:30 pm, FCS		at Louisiana–Monroe	W 76–71 ^{OT}	5–9 (1–0)	Fant–Ewing Coliseum (1,319); Monroe, LA
12/31/2011; 1:00 pm, FCS		FIU	L 63–81	5–10 (1–1)	E. A. Diddle Arena (2,375); Bowling Green, KY
01/05/2012; 7:00 pm, FCS		Louisiana–Lafayette	L 70–72 ^{OT}	5–11 (1–2)	E. A. Diddle Arena (2,137); Bowling Green, KY
01/07/2012; 4:00 pm, FCS		Troy; Ray Harper Head Coach	L 65–67	5–12 (1–3)	E. A. Diddle Arena (5,172); Bowling Green, KY
01/12/2012; 7:00 pm, WKYU		at North Texas	L 67–84	5–13 (1–4)	The Super Pit (3,941); Denton, TX
01/15/2012; 2:00 pm		at Denver	L 65–78	5–14 (1–5)	Magness Arena (6,232); Denver, CO
01/21/2012; 1:00 pm, FCS		Arkansas–Little Rock	W 65–53	6–14 (2–5)	E. A. Diddle Arena (4,254); Bowling Green, KY
01/26/2012; 6:00 pm, FCS		at Florida Atlantic	L 66–67	6–15 (2–6)	FAU Arena (1,554); Boca Raton, FL
01/28/2012; 6:30 pm, FCS		at FIU	W 61–51	7–15 (3–6)	U.S. Century Bank Arena (1,171); Miami, FL
02/04/2012; 7:00 pm, FCS		South Alabama	W 75–66	8–15 (4–6)	E. A. Diddle Arena (6,407); Bowling Green, KY
02/09/2012; 7:00 pm, ESPN3		at Middle Tennessee	L 64–72	8–16 (4–7)	Murphy Center (7,080); Murfreesboro, TN
02/11/2012; 1:00 pm, FCS		at Troy	L 77–83	8–17 (4–8)	Trojan Arena (1,472); Troy, AL
02/16/2012; 7:00 pm, FCS		Florida Atlantic	W 64–57	9–17 (5–8)	E. A. Diddle Arena (4,588); Bowling Green, KY
02/18/2012; 7:00 pm, FCS		at South Alabama	L 61–66	9–18 (5–9)	Mitchell Center (4,126); Mobile, AL
02/23/2012; 7:00 pm, FCS		Arkansas State	W 79–76	10–18 (6–9)	E. A. Diddle Arena (4,298); Bowling Green, KY
02/25/2012; 5:00 pm, Sun Belt Network		Middle Tennessee	W 73–67	11–18 (7–9)	E. A. Diddle Arena (7,326); Bowling Green, KY
2012 Sun Belt Conference men's basketball tournament
03/03/2012; 8:30 pm	(7)	vs. (10) FIU; First Round	W 67–63	12–18	Summit Arena (3,820); Hot Springs, AR
03/04/2012; 8:30 pm	(7)	vs. (2) Arkansas–Little Rock; Quarterfinals	W 68–63	13–18	Summit Arena (4,365); Hot Springs, AR
03/05/2012; 8:30 pm, Sun Belt Network	(7)	vs. (3) Denver; Semifinals	W 67–63	14–18	Summit Arena (3,708); Hot Springs, AR
03/06/2012; 6:00 pm, ESPN2	(7)	vs. (5) North Texas; Championship Game	W 74–70	15–18	Summit Arena (4,216); Hot Springs, AR
2012 NCAA tournament
03/13/2012*; 5:40 pm, truTV	(16 S)	vs. (16 S) Mississippi Valley State; First Four	W 59–58	16–18	UD Arena (8,510); Dayton, OH
03/15/2012*; 5:50 pm, TBS	(16 S)	vs. (1 S) No. 1 Kentucky; Second Round	L 66–81	16–19	KFC Yum! Center (22,131); Louisville, KY
*Non-conference game. ^{#}Rankings from AP Poll. (#) Tournament seedings in parentheses. All times are in Central Time (#) during NCAA Tournament is seed with Region; Louisville’s win was later vacated by the NCAA due to recruiting violations by the Louisville basketball program..
