= 2011–12 South Alabama Jaguars basketball team =

American college basketball season

2011–12 South Alabama Jaguars men's basketball
- Conference: Sun Belt Conference
- East Division
- Record: 17–12 (8–8 Sun Belt)
- Head coach: Ronnie Arrow (13th season)
- Assistant coaches: Jeff Price; Michael Floyd; Dominique Taylor
- Home arena: Mitchell Center

2011–12 Sun Belt Conference men's basketball standings
	Conf.				Overall
Team	W		L	PCT	W		L	PCT
East
Middle Tennessee	14	–	2	.875	27	–	7	.794
South Alabama	8	–	8	.500	17	–	12	.586
Florida Atlantic	7	–	9	.438	11	–	19	.367
Western Kentucky†	7	–	9	.438	16	–	19	.457
Troy	5	–	11	.313	10	–	18	.357
Florida International	5	–	11	.313	8	–	21	.276
West
Arkansas–Little Rock	12	–	4	.750	15	–	16	.484
Denver	11	–	5	.688	22	–	9	.710
Louisiana–Lafayette	10	–	6	.625	16	–	16	.500
North Texas	9	–	7	.563	18	–	14	.563
Arkansas State	6	–	10	.375	14	–	20	.412
*Louisiana–Monroe	2	–	14	.125	3	–	26	.103
† 2012 Sun Belt Tournament winner As of March 21, 2012; Rankings from AP Poll; *Ineligible for conference tournament

The 2011–12 South Alabama Jaguars basketball team represented the University of South Alabama during the 2011–12 NCAA Division I men's basketball season. The Jaguars were led by head coach Ronnie Arrow, in his fifth year of his second stint as head coach and 13th year overall. They played their home games at the Mitchell Center, and were members of the East Division of the Sun Belt Conference. They finished the season 17–12, 8–8 in Sun Belt play to finish in second place in the East Division. They lost in the quarterfinals of the Sun Belt tournament to Denver.

== Roster ==
Number	Name	Position	Height	Weight	Year	Hometown
1	Trey Anderson	Guard	6–3	185	Junior	Carrollton, Texas
2	Dallas Jones	Guard	6–4	215	Sophomore	New Market, Alabama
3	Xavier Roberson	Guard	6–1	180	Junior	Houston, Texas
10	Wendell Wright	Guard	6–5	195	Junior	Long Beach, California
11	Freddie Goldstein	Guard	5–10	165	Junior	Milwaukee, Wisconsin
12	Jose Diaz	Guard	5–8	170	Junior	Miami, Florida
13	Mychal Ammons	Guard	6–5	220	Freshman	Vicksburg, Mississippi
21	Augustine Rubit	Forward	6–6	235	Sophomore	Houston, Texas
22	Arman Bayatpour	Guard	5–10	150	Freshman	Mobile, Alabama
24	DeAndre Hersey	Forward	6–6	215	Junior	Carrollton, Alabama
25	Andre Gowins	Forward	6–9	240	Sophomore	Gautier, Mississippi
32	Javier Carter	Forward	6–6	215	Junior	Dallas, Texas
33	J.J. Holland	Guard	6–2	180	Freshman	Christchurch, New Zealand
34	Antione Lundy	Forward	6–7	240	Senior	Saginaw, Michigan

== Schedule ==
Date time, TV	Opponent	Result	Record	Site (attendance) city, state
Exhibition
11/02/2011*; 7:05 pm	Spring Hill	W 88–64		Mitchell Center (2,381); Mobile, AL
11/08/2011*; 7:05 pm	Dillard	W 100–56		Mitchell Center (1,703); Mobile, AL
Regular season
11/12/2011*; 1:00 pm	at Mississippi State	L 65–80	0–1	Humphrey Coliseum (5,414); Starkville, MS
11/16/2011*; 7:05 pm	Mobile	W 74–63	1–1	Mitchell Center (2,041); Mobile, AL
11/20/2011*; 2:00 pm, ESPN3	at No. 25 Florida State	L 39–80	1–2	Donald L. Tucker Center (6,641); Tallahassee, FL
11/23/2011*; 7:00 pm, CST	at LSU	W 79–75 ^{OT}	2–2	Maravich Assembly Center (6,721); Baton Rouge, LA
11/30/2011*; 7:05 pm	UAB	W 55–47	3–2	Mitchell Center (3,276); Mobile, AL
12/03/2011*; 7:05 pm	Alabama A&M	W 67–44	4–2	Mitchell Center (2,172); Mobile, AL
12/07/2011*; 7:00 pm	Southern Miss	L 54–67	4–3	Mitchell Center (3,461); Mobile, AL
12/11/2011*; 3:05 pm	Alcorn State	W 102–62	5–3	Mitchell Center (1,681); Mobile, AL
12/15/2011*; 7:00 pm	at Texas A&M–Corpus Christi	W 66–64	6–3	American Bank Center (1,159); Corpus Christi, TX
12/19/2011*; 7:05 pm	Georgia Southern	W 70–57	7–3	Mitchell Center (1,856); Mobile, AL
12/22/2011*; 4:00 pm	vs. San Diego	W 68–62	8–3	South Point Casino (500); Enterprise, NV
12/31/2011; 2:30 pm, Sun Belt Network	at Middle Tennessee	L 52–68	8–4 (0–1)	Murphy Center (3,528); Murfreesboro, TN
01/05/2012; 7:00 pm	North Texas	L 73–78 ^{OT}	8–5 (0–2)	Mitchell Center (1,592); Mobile, AL
01/07/2012; 3:30 pm, Sun Belt Network	Denver	L 50–67	8–6 (0–3)	Mitchell Center (1,902); Mobile, AL
01/12/2012; 7:00 pm	at Louisiana–Lafayette	W 70–65	9–6 (1–3)	Cajundome (3,583); Lafayette, LA
01/14/2012; 8:06 pm	at Troy	W 75–60	10–6 (2–3)	Sartain Hall (1,792); Troy, AL
01/19/2012; 7:05 pm	Florida International	L 62–65	10–7 (2–4)	Mitchell Center (2,092); Mobile, AL
01/21/2012; 7:00 pm	Middle Tennessee	L 47–68	10–8 (2–5)	Mitchell Center (2,889); Mobile, AL
01/26/2012; 7:00 pm	at Arkansas–Little Rock	L 50–75	10–9 (2–6)	Jack Stephens Center (3,475); Little Rock, AR
01/29/2012; 5:05 pm	Troy	W 68–66	11–9 (3–6)	Mitchell Center (2,196); Mobile, AL
02/02/2012; 7:05 pm	Florida Atlantic	W 65–56	12–9 (4–6)	Mitchell Center (1,866); Mobile, AL
02/04/2012; 7:00 pm, FCS	at Western Kentucky	L 66–75	12–10 (4–7)	E. A. Diddle Arena (6,407); Bowling Green, KY
02/09/2012; 7:05 pm	Arkansas State	W 74–57	13–10 (5–7)	Mitchell Center (1,835); Mobile, AL
02/11/2012; 2:00 pm	at Louisiana–Monroe	W 88–86	14–10 (6–7)	Fant–Ewing Coliseum (1,679); Monroe, LA
02/18/2012; 7:00 pm, FCS	Western Kentucky	W 66–61	15–10 (7–7)	Mitchell Center (4,126); Mobile, AL
02/23/2012; 6:00 pm	at Florida Atlantic	W 79–76 ^{OT}	16–10 (8–7)	FAU Arena (1,560); Boca Raton, FL
02/25/2012; 7:15 pm	at Florida International	L 74–81	16–11 (8–8)	U.S. Century Bank Arena (1,092); Miami, FL
2012 Sun Belt Conference men's basketball tournament
03/03/2012; 6:00 pm	vs. (11) Troy; First round	W 87–81	17–11	Convention Center Court (3,820); Hot Springs, AR
03/04/2012; 9:45 pm	vs. (3) Denver; Quarterfinals	L 50–61	17–12	Convention Center Court (4,365); Hot Springs, AR
*Non-conference game. ^{#}Rankings from AP Poll. (#) Tournament seedings in parentheses. All times are in Central Time.
