= 2011–12 Florida Atlantic Owls men's basketball team =

American college basketball season

2011–12 Florida Atlantic Owls men's basketball
- Conference: Sun Belt Conference
- East Division
- Record: 11–19 (7–9 Sun Belt)
- Head coach: Mike Jarvis (4th season)
- Assistant coaches: Mike Jarvis II; Peter Gash; Tim Kaine
- Home arena: FAU Arena

2011–12 Sun Belt Conference men's basketball standings
	Conf.				Overall
Team	W		L	PCT	W		L	PCT
East
Middle Tennessee	14	–	2	.875	27	–	7	.794
South Alabama	8	–	8	.500	17	–	12	.586
Florida Atlantic	7	–	9	.438	11	–	19	.367
Western Kentucky†	7	–	9	.438	16	–	19	.457
Troy	5	–	11	.313	10	–	18	.357
Florida International	5	–	11	.313	8	–	21	.276
West
Arkansas–Little Rock	12	–	4	.750	15	–	16	.484
Denver	11	–	5	.688	22	–	9	.710
Louisiana–Lafayette	10	–	6	.625	16	–	16	.500
North Texas	9	–	7	.563	18	–	14	.563
Arkansas State	6	–	10	.375	14	–	20	.412
*Louisiana–Monroe	2	–	14	.125	3	–	26	.103
† 2012 Sun Belt Tournament winner As of March 21, 2012; Rankings from AP Poll; *Ineligible for conference tournament

The 2011–12 Florida Atlantic Owls men's basketball team represented Florida Atlantic University during the 2011–12 NCAA Division I men's basketball season. The Owls, led by head coach Mike Jarvis, played their home games at the FAU Arena, and were members of the East Division of the Sun Belt Conference.

They finished the season 11–19, 7–9 in Sun Belt play to finish in third place in the East Division. They lost in the first round of the Sun Belt tournament to Arkansas State 55–70.

== Roster ==
Number	Name	Position	Height	Weight	Year	Hometown
1	Shavar Richardson	Guard	6–3	180	Senior	Brooklyn, New York
2	Raymond Taylor	Guard	5–6	145	Junior	Miami, Florida
3	Dragan Sekelja	Center	7–0	255	Junior	Zagreb, Croatia
4	Andre Mattison	Forward	6–7	220	Junior	Washington, D.C.
5	Alex Tucker	Guard	5–11	165	Senior	San Pedro, California
10	Dennis Mavin	Guard	6–3	183	Sophomore	Gainesville, Florida
13	Jelani Floyd	Forward	6–8	225	Fifth Year	Chicago, Illinois
21	Jordan McCoy	Forward	6–6	185	Junior	Orlando, Florida
22	Greg Gantt	Guard	6–2	205	Junior	Gainesville, Florida
25	Pablo Bertone	Guard	6–4	198	Sophomore	Arroyito, Argentina
31	Omari Grier	Guard	6–4	175	Freshman	Erial, New Jersey
44	Kelvin Penn	Forward	6–6	225	Freshman	Steilacoom, Washington
52	Kore White	Forward	6–8	245	RS Junior	Fort Lauderdale, Florida
99	Austin Hunt	Guard	6–2	162	Freshman	Miami, Florida

== Schedule ==
Date time, TV	Opponent	Result	Record	Site (attendance) city, state
Regular season
11/08/2011*; 7:00 pm	Lynn	W 64–53		FAU Arena; Boca Raton, Florida
Regular season
11/12/2011*; 2:30 pm	vs. Portland; World Vision Classic	L 65–70	0–1	Alaska Airlines Arena (8,465); Seattle, WA
11/13/2011*; 8:00 pm	at Washington; World Vision Classic	L 71–77	0–2	Alaska Airlines Arena (7,972); Seattle, WA
11/14/2012*; 7:00 pm	vs. Georgia State; World Vision Classic	W 84–77	1–2	Alaska Airlines Arena (7,918); Seattle, WA
11/16/2011*; 7:30 pm, CSNMA	at American	L 56–62	1–3	Bender Arena (1,280); Washington, D.C.
11/19/2011*; 7:00 pm	George Mason	W 80–75 ^{OT}	2–3	FAU Arena (2,854); Boca Raton, Florida
11/22/2011*; 7:00 pm	at Hofstra	W 62–60	3–3	Mack Sports Complex (1,436); Hempstead, NY
11/26/2011*; 7:00 pm	at South Florida	L 55–68	3–4	Bob Martinez Sports Center (2,109); Tampa, FL
11/30/2011*; 8:00 pm	at No. 15 Kansas	L 54–77	3–5	Allen Fieldhouse (16,300); Lawrence, KS
12/10/2011*; 7:00 pm	Warner	W 98–70	4–5	FAU Arena (1,687); Boca Raton, Florida
12/13/2011*; 9:00 pm, CSS	at No. 17 Mississippi State	L 68–75	4–6	Humphrey Coliseum (7,390); Starkville, MS
12/17/2011*; 12:00 pm, FSN	vs. Miami (FL); Orange Bowl Basketball Classic	L 90–93 ^{2OT}	4–7	BankAtlantic Center (11,262); Sunrise, FL
12/22/2011*; 7:00 pm	at Harvard	L 51–63	4–8	Lavietes Pavilion (1,973); Boston, MA
12/28/2011*; 7:00 pm	Siena	L 60–67	4–9	FAU Arena (2,064); Boca Raton, Florida
12/31/2011; 5:15 pm	at Louisiana–Lafayette	L 55–67	4–10 (0–1)	Cajundome (3,379); Lafayette, LA
1/5/2012; 7:00 pm	Louisiana–Monroe	W 58–30	5–10 (1–1)	FAU Arena (1,672); Boca Raton, Florida
1/7/2012*; 8:00 pm	at Arkansas–Little Rock	L 38–40	5–11 (1–2)	Jack Stephens Center (3,888); Little Rock, AR
1/9/2012; 8:05 pm	at Arkansas State	W 58–50	6–11 (2–2)	Convocation Center (1,568); Jonesboro, AR
1/14/2012; 7:00 pm	Middle Tennessee	L 54–67	6–12 (2–3)	FAU Arena (2,590); Boca Raton, Florida
1/19/2012; 8:30 pm	at Troy	W 88–67	7–12 (3–3)	Trojan Arena (2,573); Troy, AL
1/21/2012; 2:00 pm	at FIU	W 66–64	8–12 (4–3)	U.S. Century Bank Arena (1,577); Miami, FL
1/26/2012; 7:00 pm, FCS	Western Kentucky	W 67–66	9–12 (5–3)	FAU Arena (1,554); Boca Raton, Florida
2/2/2012; 8:05 pm	at South Alabama	L 56–65	9–13 (5–4)	Mitchell Center (1,866); Mobile, AL
2/4/2012; 7:00 pm	FIU	L 56–76	9–14 (5–5)	FAU Arena (2,854); Boca Raton, Florida
2/9/2012; 7:00 pm	Denver	W 72–71	10–14 (6–5)	FAU Arena (1,823); Boca Raton, Florida
2/11/2012; 7:00 pm	North Texas	W 86–81 ^{2OT}	11–14 (7–5)	FAU Arena (1,876); Boca Raton, Florida
2/16/2012; 8:00 pm, FCS	at Western Kentucky	L 57–64	11–15 (7–6)	E. A. Diddle Arena (4,588); Bowling Green, KY
2/18/2012; 6:30 pm, ESPN3	at Middle Tennessee	L 59–72	11–16 (7–7)	Murphy Center (7,605); Murfreesboro, TN
2/23/2012; 7:00 pm	South Alabama	L 76–79 ^{OT}	11–17 (7–8)	FAU Arena (1,560); Boca Raton, Florida
2/25/2012; 7:00 pm	Troy	L 82–83	11–18 (7–9)	FAU Arena (2,804); Boca Raton, Florida
2012 Sun Belt tournament
03/03/2012; 7:15 pm	vs. (9) Arkansas State; First round	L 55–70	11–19	Convention Center; Hot Springs, AR
*Non-conference game. ^{#}Rankings from AP Poll. (#) Tournament seedings in parentheses. All times are in Eastern Time.
