= 2011–12 NCAA Division I men's basketball season =

Basketball season

- Preseason AP No. 1: North Carolina Tar Heels
- Regular season: November 7, 2011 – March 11, 2012
- NCAA Tournament: 2012
- Tournament dates: March 13 – April 2, 2012
- National Championship: Mercedes-Benz Superdome; New Orleans, Louisiana
- NCAA Champions: Kentucky Wildcats
- Other champions: Stanford Cardinal (NIT), Pittsburgh Panthers (CBI), Mercer Bears (CIT)
- Player of the Year (Naismith, Wooden): Anthony Davis, Kentucky Wildcats

The 2011–12 NCAA Division I men's basketball season began on November 7, 2011, with the Coaches vs. Cancer Classic and ended with the 2012 NCAA Division I men's basketball tournament's championship game on April 2, 2012, at the Mercedes-Benz Superdome in New Orleans, Louisiana. The tournament began with four first-round games on March 13–14, 2012 in Dayton, Ohio, followed by second and third rounds from Thursday through Sunday, March 15–18, 2012. Regional games were played from Thursday through Sunday, March 22–25, 2012, with the Final Four played on Saturday March 31, 2012, and the national championship game on Monday, April 2, 2012.

Kentucky claimed its eighth NCAA title, defeating Kansas 67–59 in the final. Consensus national player of the year Anthony Davis of Kentucky was named Most Outstanding Player of the tournament.

== Season headlines ==
- September 13 – NCAA recruiting frenzy resumed when high school junior Jabari Parker held an open practice attended by representatives of 42 NCAA Division I schools, including Mike Krzyzewski, Roy Williams, Tom Izzo, Bruce Weber, Billy Kennedy, Thad Matta, Bill Self, Oliver Purnell and Larry Krystkowiak.
- November 1 – The AP preseason All-American team was named. Ohio State's Jared Sullinger was the only unanimous pick. Joining Sullinger were North Carolina forward Harrison Barnes (63 of 65 possible votes), Wisconsin guard Jordan Taylor (51), Kentucky forward Terrence Jones (33) and Connecticut guard Jeremy Lamb (25).
- After Tennessee head coach Bruce Pearl was fired following the 2010–11 season for major recruiting violations, he took a job as vice president of marketing with a Knoxville-based wholesale grocery company, H.T. Hackney. He had been offered an opportunity to coach the NBA Development League's Texas Legends but declined because he wanted to stay in the Knoxville area with his family.
- November 11 – the game between Michigan State and #1 North Carolina, known as the inaugural Carrier Classic, was played on the deck of the USS Carl Vinson off the coast of Coronado, California on Veterans Day. It was the first ever college basketball game played on a Navy aircraft carrier. President Barack Obama and Michelle Obama attended the game as North Carolina won 67–55.
- November 17 – Syracuse associate head coach Bernie Fine was placed on paid administrative leave after accusations by multiple former ball boys claimed that he sexually molested them a number of times spanning more than 10 years. The story about Fine broke less than two weeks after the Penn State sex abuse scandal came to light. Fine was subsequently fired on November 27, ending his streak as Division I's longest-tenured assistant coach at one school.
- December 5 – Harvard became ranked in the AP Poll for the first time in school history, coming in at No. 25 after an 8–0 start. It leaves Brown as the only remaining Ivy League school to have never been ranked in the poll and leaves only seven schools that have played Division I basketball since the AP Poll began that have never been ranked in it.
- December 5 – Mike Krzyzewski and Tennessee Lady Volunteers coach Pat Summitt were named the co-recipients of the annual Sports Illustrated Sportsman of the Year award, making them the third and fourth college basketball coaches selected in its 57-year history.
- December 28 – After beating (15 AP/14 Coaches) Mississippi State, the Baylor Bears had their program's first ever 13–0 start and a school-record tying 13-game winning streak. The Bears' record reached 17–0 before finally losing to No. 7 Kansas, 92–74, on January 16. At the time of their first loss they were ranked No. 3 in the nation, another all-time program high.
- December 31 – No. 13 Indiana defeats No. 2 Ohio State, becoming the first Hoosiers men's basketball team to defeat both the No. 1 and No. 2 ranked teams in the same season (they had also previously upset then-#1 Kentucky, 73–72).
- January 5 – A Sun Belt Conference game between Louisiana–Lafayette and Western Kentucky ends in controversy, as officials failed to notice that the Ragin' Cajuns had six men on the court when Elfrid Payton drove for the layup that gave them a 72–70 win on WKU's home court. The conference's coordinator of officials stated that the error was not correctable post-game, but indicated that suspensions of the three officials involved were possible.
- February 9 – Murray State, the last unbeaten team in Division I men's basketball and ranked No. 9 in the country, loses at home to Tennessee State 72–68.
- February 21 – Binghamton becomes the last team in Division I to win a game. They started 0–26 until a 57–53 upset win over Vermont.
- February 24 – Radford receives two years of probation, but no postseason ban, for providing impermissible benefits to recruits. Former head coach Brad Greenberg, who left after the 2010–11 season, is hit with a five-year show-cause penalty for leading an effort to mislead NCAA investigators.
- March 8 – Yahoo! Sports reports that the FBI is investigating suspended Auburn point guard Varez Ward for possible involvement in a point shaving scheme. A second Auburn player had been investigated but was cleared.

=== Milestones and records ===
- November 11 – Louisville coach Rick Pitino recorded his 600th career win in an 83–48 victory over Tennessee–Martin. He became the 15th fastest coach to do so (38th overall).
- November 15 – Duke coach Mike Krzyzewski recorded his 903rd win as a head coach, surpassing his former college coach Bob Knight for the most in Division I men's basketball history. The #6 Blue Devils defeated Michigan State, 74–69, at Madison Square Garden.
- November 20 – Connecticut point guard Shabazz Napier recorded the ninth triple-double in school history. He compiled 22 points, 13 assists and 12 rebounds in an 87–70 win over Coppin State.
- November 22 – Tennessee forward Jeronne Maymon scored 32 points and grabbed a Maui Invitational Tournament-record 20 rebounds in a double-overtime loss to #8 Memphis, 99–97.
- November 28 – Florida coach Billy Donovan recorded his 400th career win in a 96–70 defeat of Stetson.
- December 3 – Ohio State coach Thad Matta recorded his 300th career win in a 64–35 defeat of Texas–Pan American.
- December 10 – IUPUI player Alex Young scored a team record 43 points in an 84–76 win over Western Kentucky.
- December 30 – Coppin State coach Fang Mitchell recorded his 400th win at the school in a 93–83 defeat of Nebraska-Omaha.
- January 4 – Zack Rosen became Penn's all-time assist leader, passing his coach Jerome Allen's mark of 505. Rosen finished his career with 588 assists.
- January 10 – Illinois guard Brandon Paul scored 43 points in a 79–74 upset over No. 5 Ohio State. The 43 points was the third-highest scoring game in Illinois history and his eight three-pointers tied a school record.
- Guard Alex Young of IUPUI, UC Santa Barbara guard Orlando Johnson, High Point guard Nick Barbour, Oral Roberts forward Dominique Morrison, Oakland guard Reggie Hamilton, Tennessee Tech guard Kevin Murphy, Lehigh guard CJ McCollum, St. Bonaventure forward Andrew Nicholson and Northwestern forward John Shurna each passed the 2,000 point mark for their careers.
- January 17 – Western Carolina defeated Toccoa Falls College (a member of the National Christian College Athletic Association) by a score of 141–39, making the 102-point win margin the third largest in NCAA Division I men's basketball history. It also set WCU program records for points in a game and points in a half (72; first half). Nine players scored in double figures for the Catamounts.
- January 28 – Towson defeated UNC Wilmington 66–61, ending the longest losing streak in Division I men's basketball history at 41 games.
- January 30 – Tennessee Tech guard Kevin Murphy scored 50 points against SIU Edwardsville, breaking the previous school record of 38.
- February 18 – Iona point guard Scott Machado set the Metro Atlantic Athletic Conference record for single-season and career assists in a Bracket Buster game against Nevada Machado finished the season with 327 assists and tallied 880 for his career.
- February 29 – North Carolina point guard Kendall Marshall broke Ed Cota's school single-season assist record (284) in a win over Maryland On March 9 in an ACC tournament game against NC State, Marshall eclipsed Craig Neal's ACC single season assist mark of 303. Marshall finished the season with 351 assists.
- Missouri's Ricardo Ratliffe set the Missouri and Big 12 Conference single season record for field goal percentage. Ratliffe shot 69.3% from the floor, also leading the country in this category.
- March 16 – In the NCAA tournament's Round of 64, Michigan State's Draymond Green recorded a triple-double with 24 points, 12 rebounds and 10 assists. Green also had recorded a triple-double in a 2011 tournament game, making him one of only three players in history to record multiple triple-doubles in its history, and the only one officially recognized by the NCAA to have accomplished this feat. The others were Hall of Famers Oscar Robertson (4) and Magic Johnson (2).
- April 2 – By winning the national championship game, Kentucky records its 38th win, setting a new all-time single season record for a men's Division I basketball program.
- April 2 – Jeff Withey of Kansas broke Joakim Noah's NCAA tournament blocked shot record of 29, set in 2006. Withey finished with 31 blocks in the 2012 NCAA tournament. Kentucky's Anthony Davis also tied Noah's record.

== Conference membership changes ==
The 2011–12 season saw the first wave of membership changes resulting from a major realignment of NCAA Division I conferences. The cycle began in 2010 with the Big Ten Conference and the then-Pacific-10 Conference announcing their intentions to expand. The fallout from these conferences' moves later affected a majority of Division I conferences.

School	Former conference	New conference
Boise State Broncos	Western Athletic Conference	Mountain West Conference
BYU Cougars	Mountain West Conference	West Coast Conference
Campbell Fighting Camels	Atlantic Sun Conference	Big South Conference
Centenary Gentlemen	The Summit League	American Southwest Conference (D-III)
Colorado Buffaloes	Big 12 Conference	Pac-12 Conference
Nebraska Cornhuskers	Big 12 Conference	Big Ten Conference
New Orleans Privateers	NCAA Division I independent	NCAA Division II independent
North Carolina Central Eagles	NCAA Division I independent	Mid-Eastern Athletic Conference
Omaha Mavericks	Mid-America Intercollegiate Athletics Association (D-II)	NCAA Division I independent
Savannah State Tigers	NCAA Division I independent	Mid-Eastern Athletic Conference
South Dakota Coyotes	Great West Conference	The Summit League
Southern Illinois University (SIU) Edwardsville Cougars	NCAA Division I Independent	Ohio Valley Conference
Utah Utes	Mountain West Conference	Pac-12 Conference

== New arenas ==
- Bowling Green, which had played since 1960 at the on-campus Anderson Arena, opened the Stroh Center, also on campus. In the first regular-season game in the new arena, the Falcons defeated Howard 63–48 on November 11.
- Evansville moved from Roberts Municipal Stadium, their home since 1956, to the new Ford Center in downtown Evansville. The Purple Aces also won their first regular-season game in the new building, defeating Butler 80–77 in overtime on November 12. (Incidentally, this was Butler's second consecutive season as the first regular-season opponent in a new facility; the 2010–11 team christened Louisville's new KFC Yum! Center.)
- Omaha made its Division I debut in the new Ralston Arena, an off-campus venue in Ralston, a suburb of Omaha. The team's former on-campus home, Lee & Helene Sapp Fieldhouse, remained in use by the Omaha women's team. (Both teams would move in 2015 to the on-campus Baxter Arena.)
- UNC Asheville, like Bowling Green, moved from one on-campus facility to another, leaving behind their home since 1963, the Justice Center, for the new Kimmel Arena. The Bulldogs brought in top-ranked North Carolina for the arena's regular-season opening on November 13. The Tar Heels, playing in head coach Roy Williams' hometown, won 91–75. (UNC Asheville was also christening a new arena for the second consecutive season; the 2010–11 team defeated Auburn in the first regular-season game at the Tigers' new Auburn Arena.)
- UT Arlington moved in midseason. The Mavericks started the season at Texas Hall, which opened in 1965 when the team was known as the Arlington State Rebels. On February 1, the Mavericks opened College Park Center, located on the opposite side of their campus, defeating UTSA 67–66.

== Major rule changes ==
Beginning in 2011–12, the following rules change was implemented:

- The charge circle was instituted – a semi-circle in front of the basket. Secondary defenders must be outside of this circle to effectively draw a charge. Otherwise they will be assessed an automatic blocking foul.

== Season outlook ==
=== Pre-season polls ===
The top 25 from the AP and ESPN/USA Today Coaches Polls.

Associated Press
Ranking	Team
1	North Carolina (62)
2	Kentucky
3	Ohio State (1)
4	Connecticut (2)
5	Syracuse
6	Duke
7	Vanderbilt
8	Florida
9	Louisville
10	Pittsburgh
11	Memphis
12	Baylor
13	Kansas
14	Xavier
15	Wisconsin
16	Arizona
17	UCLA
18	Alabama
19	Michigan
20	Texas A&M
21	Cincinnati
22	Marquette
23	Gonzaga
24	California
25	Missouri

ESPN/USA Today Coaches
Ranking	Team
1	North Carolina (31)
2	Kentucky (1)
3	Ohio State
4	Connecticut
5	Syracuse
6	Duke
7	Vanderbilt
8	Louisville
9	Memphis
10	Florida
11	Pittsburgh
12	Baylor
13	Kansas
14	Wisconsin
15	Xavier
16	Arizona
17	Alabama
18	Michigan
19	Texas A&M
20	UCLA
21	Marquette
22	Cincinnati
23	Gonzaga
24	California
25	Missouri

== Regular season ==
A number of early-season tournaments marked the beginning of the college basketball season.

=== Early-season tournaments ===
Name	Dates	No. teams	Champion
Coaches vs. Cancer Classic	November 7, 2011 – November 8, 2011	4*	Mississippi State
World Vision Classic	November 12, 2011 – November 14, 2011	4	Washington
Hall of Fame Tipoff	November 11, 2011 – November 20, 2011	4*	Kentucky
Charleston Classic	November 17, 2011 – November 20, 2011	8	Northwestern
Puerto Rico Tip-Off	November 17, 2011 – November 20, 2011	8	Alabama
Legends Classic	November 19, 2011 – November 21, 2011	4*	Vanderbilt
Paradise Jam tournament	November 14, 2011 – November 21, 2011	8	Marquette
CBE Classic	November 21, 2011 – November 22, 2011	4*	Missouri
Cancún Challenge	November 22, 2011 – November 23, 2011	8	Illinois
Maui Invitational Tournament	November 21, 2011 – November 23, 2011	8*	Duke
NIT Season Tip-Off	November 14, 2011 – November 25, 2011	16	Syracuse
Chicago Invitational Challenge	November 13, 2011 – November 26, 2011	4*	Wisconsin
Great Alaska Shootout	November 23, 2011 – November 26, 2011	8	Murray State
Las Vegas Invitational	November 25, 2011 – November 26, 2011	4*	UNLV
South Padre Island Invitational	November 25, 2011 – November 26, 2011	8	Northern Iowa
Battle 4 Atlantis	November 23, 2011 – November 27, 2011	8	Harvard
76 Classic	November 24, 2011 – November 27, 2011	8	Saint Louis
Old Spice Classic	November 23, 2011 – November 27, 2011	8	Dayton
Las Vegas Classic	December 13, 2011 – December 23, 2011	4*	Baylor
Diamond Head Classic	December 22, 2011 – December 25, 2011	8	Kansas State

*Although these tournaments include more teams, only the number listed play for the championship.

=== Conferences ===
==== Conference winners and tournaments ====
Thirty-one conference seasons concluded with a single-elimination tournament. The teams in each conference that won their regular-season titles were given the number one seed in their respective conference tournaments. Conference tournament winners received an automatic bid to the 2012 NCAA Division I men's basketball tournament except for the winner of the Great West Conference tournament, although its champion received an automatic bid to the 2012 CollegeInsider.com Tournament. The Ivy League was the only NCAA Division I conference that did not hold a conference tournament, instead sending its regular-season champion to the NCAA tournament.

Conference	Regular season winner	Conference Player of the Year	Conference Coach of the Year	Conference tournament	Tournament venue (city)	Tournament winner
America East Conference	Stony Brook	Darryl Partin, Boston University	Steve Pikiell, Stony Brook	2012 America East men's basketball tournament	Chase Family Arena (West Hartford, Connecticut); Final at campus site	Vermont
Atlantic 10 Conference	Temple	Andrew Nicholson, St. Bonaventure	Fran Dunphy, Temple	2012 Atlantic 10 men's basketball tournament	First round at campus sites Remainder at Boardwalk Hall (Atlantic City, New Jersey)	St. Bonaventure
Atlantic Coast Conference	North Carolina	Tyler Zeller, North Carolina	Leonard Hamilton, Florida State	2012 ACC men's basketball tournament	Philips Arena (Atlanta, Georgia)	Florida State
Atlantic Sun Conference	Belmont	Torrey Craig, South Carolina Upstate	Eddie Payne, South Carolina Upstate	2012 Atlantic Sun men's basketball tournament	University Center (Macon, Georgia)	Belmont
Big 12 Conference	Kansas	Thomas Robinson, Kansas	Fred Hoiberg, Iowa State & Bill Self, Kansas	2012 Big 12 men's basketball tournament	Sprint Center (Kansas City, Missouri)	Missouri
Big East Conference	Syracuse	Jae Crowder, Marquette	Stan Heath, South Florida	2012 Big East men's basketball tournament	Madison Square Garden (New York, New York)	Louisville
Big Sky Conference	Montana	Damian Lillard, Weber State	Wayne Tinkle, Montana	2012 Big Sky Conference men's basketball tournament	First round at campus sites	Montana
Big South Conference	UNC Asheville	Matt Dickey, UNC Asheville	Barclay Radebaugh, Charleston Southern	2012 Big South Conference men's basketball tournament	Campus Sites	UNC Asheville
Big Ten Conference	Michigan State, Ohio State & Michigan	Draymond Green, Michigan State	Tom Izzo, Michigan State	2012 Big Ten Conference men's basketball tournament	Bankers Life Fieldhouse (Indianapolis, Indiana)	Michigan State
Big West Conference	Long Beach State	Casper Ware, Long Beach State	Dan Monson, Long Beach State	2012 Big West Conference men's basketball tournament	Honda Center; Anaheim, California	Long Beach State
Colonial Athletic Association	Drexel	Ryan Pearson, George Mason	Bruiser Flint, Drexel	2012 CAA men's basketball tournament	Richmond Coliseum (Richmond, Virginia)	VCU
Conference USA	Memphis	Will Barton, Memphis	Larry Eustachy, Southern Miss	2012 Conference USA men's basketball tournament	FedExForum (Memphis, Tennessee)	Memphis
Great West Conference	Utah Valley	Isaiah Wilkerson, NJIT	Dick Hunsaker, Utah Valley	2012 Great West Conference men's basketball tournament	Emil and Patricia Jones Convocation Center (Chicago, Illinois)	North Dakota
Horizon League	Valparaiso	Ryan Broekhoff, Valparaiso	Bryce Drew, Valparaiso	2012 Horizon League men's basketball tournament	First round at campus sites Second round and semifinals at No. 1 seed Final at top surviving seed	Detroit
Ivy League	Harvard	Zack Rosen, Penn		No Tournament		
Metro Atlantic Athletic Conference	Iona	Scott Machado, Iona	Jimmy Patsos, Loyola (MD)	2012 MAAC men's basketball tournament	MassMutual Center; Springfield, Massachusetts	Loyola (MD)
Mid-American Conference	Akron (East); Eastern Michigan (West)	Mitchell Watt, Buffalo	Rob Murphy, Eastern Michigan	2012 MAC men's basketball tournament	First round at campus sites Remainder at Quicken Loans Arena (Cleveland, Ohio)	Ohio
Mid-Eastern Athletic Conference	Savannah State	Kyle O'Quinn, Norfolk State	Horace Broadnax, Savannah State	2012 MEAC men's basketball tournament	LJVM Coliseum; Winston-Salem, North Carolina	Norfolk State
Missouri Valley Conference	Wichita State	Doug McDermott, Creighton	Gregg Marshall, Wichita State	2012 Missouri Valley Conference men's basketball tournament	Scottrade Center (St. Louis, Missouri)	Creighton
Mountain West Conference	New Mexico & San Diego State	Jamaal Franklin, San Diego State	Steve Fisher, San Diego State	2012 Mountain West Conference men's basketball tournament	Thomas & Mack Center (Paradise, Nevada)	New Mexico
Northeast Conference	Long Island	Julian Boyd, Long Island	Glenn Braica, St. Francis (NY)	2012 Northeast Conference men's basketball tournament	Campus Sites	Long Island
Ohio Valley Conference	Murray State	Isaiah Canaan, Murray State	Steve Prohm, Murray State	2012 Ohio Valley Conference men's basketball tournament	Municipal Auditorium (Nashville, Tennessee)	Murray State
Pac-12 Conference	Washington	Jorge Gutierrez, California	Lorenzo Romar, Washington	2012 Pac-12 Conference men's basketball tournament	Staples Center (Los Angeles, California)	Colorado
Patriot League	Bucknell	CJ McCollum, Lehigh	Dave Paulsen, Bucknell	2012 Patriot League men's basketball tournament	Campus Sites	Lehigh
Southeastern Conference	Kentucky	Anthony Davis, Kentucky	John Calipari, Kentucky	2012 SEC men's basketball tournament	New Orleans Arena (New Orleans, Louisiana)	Vanderbilt
Southern Conference	Davidson (South); UNC Greensboro (North)	De'Mon Brooks (Coaches) & Jake Cohen (Media), Davidson	Bob McKillop, Davidson (Coaches); Wes Miller, UNC Greensboro (Media)	2012 Southern Conference men's basketball tournament	Asheville Civic Center; Asheville, North Carolina	Davidson
Southland Conference	Lamar (East); Texas–Arlington (West)	Patrick Richard, McNeese State	Scott Cross, Texas–Arlington	2012 Southland Conference men's basketball tournament	Leonard E. Merrell Center; Katy, Texas	Lamar
Southwestern Athletic Conference	Mississippi Valley State	Paul Crosby, Mississippi Valley State	Sean Woods, Mississippi Valley State	2012 SWAC men's basketball tournament	Garland Special Events Center; Garland, Texas	Mississippi Valley State
The Summit League	Oral Roberts	Dominique Morrison, Oral Roberts	Scott Sutton, Oral Roberts	2012 The Summit League men's basketball tournament	Sioux Falls Arena (Sioux Falls, South Dakota)	South Dakota State
Sun Belt Conference	Middle Tennessee (East); Arkansas–Little Rock (West)	LaRon Dendy, Middle Tennessee	Kermit Davis, Middle Tennessee	2012 Sun Belt Conference men's basketball tournament	Summit Arena (Hot Springs, Arkansas)	Western Kentucky
West Coast Conference	Saint Mary's	Matthew Dellavedova, Saint Mary's	Max Good, Loyola Marymount	2012 West Coast Conference men's basketball tournament	Orleans Arena (Paradise, Nevada)	Saint Mary's
Western Athletic Conference	Nevada	Deonte Burton, Nevada	David Carter, Nevada	2012 WAC men's basketball tournament	Orleans Arena (Paradise, Nevada)	New Mexico State

==== Conference standings ====
2011–12 America East men's basketball standings
	Conf.				Overall
Team	W		L	PCT	W		L	PCT
Stony Brook	14	–	2	.875	22	–	10	.688
Vermont †	13	–	3	.813	24	–	12	.667
Boston University	12	–	4	.750	16	–	16	.500
Albany	9	–	7	.563	19	–	15	.559
Hartford	7	–	9	.438	9	–	22	.290
New Hampshire	7	–	9	.438	13	–	16	.448
Maine	6	–	10	.375	12	–	17	.414
UMBC	3	–	13	.188	4	–	26	.133
Binghamton	1	–	15	.063	2	–	29	.065
† 2012 America East tournament winner As of March 16, 2012; Rankings from AP Poll

2011–12 Atlantic 10 men's basketball standings
	Conf.				Overall
Team	W		L	PCT	W		L	PCT
Temple	13	–	3	.813	24	–	8	.750
Saint Louis	12	–	4	.750	26	–	8	.765
Xavier	10	–	6	.625	23	–	13	.639
St. Bonaventure†	10	–	6	.625	20	–	12	.625
UMass	9	–	7	.563	26	–	11	.703
La Salle	9	–	7	.563	21	–	13	.618
Dayton	9	–	7	.563	20	–	13	.606
Saint Joseph's	9	–	7	.563	20	–	14	.588
Duquesne	7	–	9	.438	16	–	15	.516
Richmond	7	–	9	.438	16	–	16	.500
Charlotte	5	–	11	.313	13	–	17	.433
George Washington	5	–	11	.313	10	–	21	.323
Rhode Island	4	–	12	.250	7	–	24	.226
Fordham	3	–	13	.188	10	–	19	.345
† 2012 Atlantic 10 Tournament winner As of March 13, 2012; Rankings from AP Poll

2011–12 ACC men's basketball standings
	Conf.				Overall
Team	W		L	PCT	W		L	PCT
No. 6 North Carolina	14	–	2	.875	32	–	6	.842
No. 14 Duke	13	–	3	.813	27	–	7	.794
No. 15 Florida State†	12	–	4	.750	25	–	10	.714
Virginia	9	–	7	.563	22	–	10	.688
No. 20 NC State	9	–	7	.563	24	–	13	.649
Miami (FL)	9	–	7	.563	20	–	13	.606
Clemson	8	–	8	.500	16	–	15	.516
Maryland	6	–	10	.375	17	–	15	.531
Virginia Tech	4	–	12	.250	16	–	17	.485
Wake Forest	4	–	12	.250	13	–	18	.419
Georgia Tech	4	–	12	.250	11	–	20	.355
Boston College	4	–	12	.250	9	–	22	.290
† 2012 ACC tournament winner As of April 3, 2012; Rankings from Coaches Poll

2011–12 Atlantic Sun men's basketball standings
	Conf.				Overall
Team	W		L	PCT	W		L	PCT
Belmont†	16	–	2	.889	27	–	8	.771
Mercer	13	–	5	.722	27	–	11	.711
USC Upstate	13	–	5	.722	21	–	13	.618
East Tennessee State	10	–	8	.556	17	–	14	.548
North Florida	10	–	8	.556	16	–	16	.500
Florida Gulf Coast	8	–	10	.444	15	–	17	.469
Lipscomb	8	–	10	.444	13	–	18	.419
Jacksonville	6	–	12	.333	8	–	22	.267
Stetson	6	–	12	.333	9	–	20	.310
Kennesaw State	0	–	18	.000	3	–	28	.097
† 2012 Atlantic Sun Tournament winner As of March 28, 2012; Rankings from AP Poll

2011–12 Big East men's basketball standings
	Conf.				Overall
Team	W		L	PCT	W		L	PCT
No. 11 Marquette	14	–	4	.778	27	–	8	.771
Notre Dame	13	–	5	.722	22	–	12	.647
Cincinnati	12	–	6	.667	26	–	11	.703
No. 15 Georgetown	12	–	6	.667	24	–	9	.727
South Florida	12	–	6	.667	22	–	14	.611
West Virginia	9	–	9	.500	19	–	14	.576
Connecticut	8	–	10	.444	20	–	14	.588
Seton Hall	8	–	10	.444	21	–	13	.618
Rutgers	6	–	12	.333	14	–	18	.438
St. John's	6	–	12	.333	13	–	19	.406
Pittsburgh	5	–	13	.278	22	–	17	.564
Villanova	5	–	13	.278	13	–	19	.406
Providence	4	–	14	.222	15	–	17	.469
DePaul	3	–	15	.167	12	–	19	.387
*No. 2 Syracuse	0	–	1	.000	0	–	3	.000
**No. 17 Louisville†	0	–	8	.000	0	–	10	.000
† 2012 Big East tournament winner As of March 31, 2012; *Syracuse: 30 reg. season games, 4 postseason games vacated due to sanctions against the program; Disputed record: Syracuse–(34–3)(17–1) **Louisville: 25 reg. season games, 5 postseason games vacated due to sanctions against the program; Disputed record: Louisville–(30-10)(10-8); Rankings from AP Poll

2011–12 Big Sky men's basketball standings
	Conf.				Overall
Team	W		L	PCT	W		L	PCT
Montana †	15	–	1	.938	25	–	7	.781
Weber State	14	–	2	.875	25	–	7	.781
Portland State	10	–	6	.625	17	–	14	.548
Eastern Washington	8	–	8	.500	15	–	17	.469
Idaho State	7	–	9	.438	9	–	21	.300
Montana State	7	–	9	.438	12	–	17	.414
Northern Colorado	5	–	11	.313	9	–	19	.321
Sacramento State	5	–	11	.313	10	–	18	.357
Northern Arizona	1	–	15	.063	5	–	24	.172
† Conference tournament winner

2011–12 Big South men's basketball standings
	Conf.				Overall
Team	W		L	PCT	W		L	PCT
UNC Asheville†	16	–	2	.889	24	–	10	.706
Coastal Carolina	12	–	6	.667	19	–	12	.613
Campbell	11	–	7	.611	17	–	15	.531
Charleston Southern	11	–	7	.611	19	–	12	.613
Liberty	9	–	9	.500	15	–	17	.469
Winthrop	8	–	10	.444	12	–	20	.375
VMI	8	–	10	.444	17	–	16	.515
High Point	8	–	10	.444	13	–	18	.419
Presbyterian*	8	–	10	.444	14	–	15	.483
Gardner–Webb	6	–	12	.333	12	–	20	.375
Radford	2	–	16	.111	6	–	26	.188
† 2012 Big South tournament winner As of March 15, 2012; Rankings from AP Poll; *Ineligible for conference tournament

2011–12 Big Ten Conference men's basketball standings
	Conf.				Overall
Team	W		L	PCT	W		L	PCT
No. 5 Michigan State†	13	–	5	.722	29	–	8	.784
No. 13 Michigan	13	–	5	.722	24	–	10	.706
No. 7 Ohio State	13	–	5	.722	31	–	8	.795
No. 14 Wisconsin	12	–	6	.667	26	–	10	.722
No. 16 Indiana	11	–	7	.611	27	–	9	.750
Purdue	10	–	8	.556	22	–	13	.629
Northwestern	8	–	10	.444	19	–	14	.576
Iowa	8	–	10	.444	18	–	17	.514
Illinois	6	–	12	.333	17	–	15	.531
Minnesota	6	–	12	.333	23	–	15	.605
Nebraska	4	–	14	.222	12	–	18	.400
Penn State	4	–	14	.222	12	–	20	.375
† 2012 Big Ten tournament winner Rankings from AP poll

2011–12 Big 12 men's basketball standings
	Conf.				Overall
Team	W		L	PCT	W		L	PCT
No. 6 Kansas	16	–	2	.889	32	–	7	.821
No. 3 Missouri †	14	–	4	.778	30	–	5	.857
Iowa State	12	–	6	.667	23	–	11	.676
No. 9 Baylor	12	–	6	.667	30	–	8	.789
Kansas State	10	–	8	.556	22	–	11	.667
Texas	9	–	9	.500	20	–	14	.588
Oklahoma State	7	–	11	.389	15	–	18	.455
Oklahoma	5	–	13	.278	15	–	16	.484
Texas A&M	4	–	14	.222	14	–	18	.438
Texas Tech	1	–	17	.056	8	–	23	.258
† 2012 Big 12 Tournament winner Rankings from AP poll

2011–12 Big West men's basketball standings
	Conf.				Overall
Team	W		L	PCT	W		L	PCT
Long Beach State †	15	–	1	.938	25	–	9	.735
Cal State Fullerton	12	–	4	.750	21	–	10	.677
UC Santa Barbara	12	–	4	.750	20	–	11	.645
Cal Poly	8	–	8	.500	18	–	15	.545
UC Riverside	7	–	9	.438	14	–	17	.452
Pacific	6	–	10	.375	11	–	19	.367
UC Irvine	6	–	10	.375	12	–	20	.375
UC Davis	3	–	13	.188	5	–	26	.161
Cal State Northridge*	3	–	13	.188	7	–	21	.250
† 2012 Big West tournament winner As of March 15, 2012; Rankings from AP Poll; *Ineligible for conference tournament due to low APR

2011–12 CAA men's basketball standings
	Conf.				Overall
Team	W		L	PCT	W		L	PCT
Drexel	16	–	2	.889	29	–	7	.806
VCU†	15	–	3	.833	29	–	7	.806
George Mason	14	–	4	.778	24	–	9	.727
Old Dominion	13	–	5	.722	21	–	13	.618
Delaware	12	–	6	.667	18	–	14	.563
Georgia State	11	–	7	.611	22	–	11	.667
Northeastern	9	–	9	.500	14	–	17	.452
James Madison	5	–	13	.278	12	–	20	.375
UNCW	5	–	13	.278	10	–	21	.323
William & Mary	4	–	14	.222	6	–	26	.188
Hofstra	3	–	15	.167	10	–	22	.313
Towson	1	–	17	.056	1	–	31	.031
† 2012 CAA tournament winner Rankings from AP poll

2011–12 Conference USA men's basketball standings
	Conf.				Overall
Team	W		L	PCT	W		L	PCT
Memphis†	13	–	3	.813	26	–	8	.765
Southern Miss	11	–	5	.688	25	–	9	.735
Tulsa	10	–	6	.625	17	–	14	.548
UCF	10	–	6	.625	22	–	11	.667
UAB	9	–	7	.563	15	–	16	.484
Marshall	9	–	7	.563	21	–	14	.600
Rice	8	–	8	.500	18	–	15	.545
UTEP	7	–	9	.438	15	–	17	.469
Houston	7	–	9	.438	15	–	15	.500
East Carolina	5	–	11	.313	15	–	16	.484
SMU	4	–	12	.250	13	–	19	.406
Tulane	3	–	13	.188	15	–	19	.441
† 2012 CUSA Tournament winner As of March 15, 2012; Rankings from AP Poll

2011–12 Great West Conference men's basketball standings
	Conf.				Overall
Team	W		L	PCT	W		L	PCT
Utah Valley	9	–	1	.900	20	–	13	.606
North Dakota †	6	–	4	.600	17	–	15	.531
Texas-Pan American	5	–	5	.500	11	–	21	.344
NJIT	5	–	5	.500	15	–	17	.469
Houston Baptist	3	–	7	.300	10	–	20	.333
* Chicago State	2	–	8	.200	4	–	26	.133
† 2012 Great West tournament winner As of March 14, 2012; Rankings from AP Poll * Ineligible for conference tournament

2011–12 Horizon League men's basketball standings
	Conf.				Overall
Team	W		L	PCT	W		L	PCT
Valparaiso	14	–	4	.778	22	–	11	.667
Cleveland State	12	–	6	.667	22	–	11	.667
Detroit †	11	–	7	.611	22	–	14	.611
Milwaukee	11	–	7	.611	20	–	13	.606
Butler	11	–	7	.611	22	–	14	.611
Youngstown State	10	–	8	.556	16	–	15	.516
Green Bay	10	–	8	.556	15	–	15	.500
Wright State	7	–	11	.389	13	–	19	.406
UIC	3	–	15	.167	8	–	22	.267
Loyola Chicago	1	–	17	.056	7	–	23	.233
† 2012 Horizon League Tournament winner As of March 6, 2012; Rankings from AP Poll

2011–12 Ivy League men's basketball standings
	Conf.				Overall
Team	W		L	PCT	W		L	PCT
Harvard	12	–	2	.857	26	–	5	.839
Penn	11	–	3	.786	20	–	13	.606
Princeton	10	–	4	.714	20	–	12	.625
Yale	9	–	5	.643	19	–	10	.655
Cornell	7	–	7	.500	12	–	16	.429
Columbia	4	–	10	.286	15	–	15	.500
Brown	2	–	12	.143	8	–	23	.258
Dartmouth	1	–	13	.071	5	–	25	.167
As of March 15, 2012; Rankings from AP Poll

2011–12 MAAC men's basketball standings
	Conf.				Overall
Team	W		L	PCT	W		L	PCT
Iona	15	–	3	.833	25	–	8	.758
Loyola (MD) †	13	–	5	.722	24	–	9	.727
Manhattan	12	–	6	.667	21	–	13	.618
Fairfield	12	–	6	.667	22	–	15	.595
Rider	10	–	8	.556	13	–	19	.406
Siena	8	–	10	.444	14	–	17	.452
Niagara	8	–	10	.444	14	–	19	.424
Marist	7	–	11	.389	14	–	18	.438
Saint Peter's	4	–	14	.222	5	–	26	.161
Canisius	1	–	17	.056	5	–	25	.167
† 2012 MAAC tournament winner Rankings from AP Poll

2011–12 Mid-American Conference men's basketball standings
	Conf.				Overall
Team	W		L	PCT	W		L	PCT
East
Akron	13	–	3	.813	22	–	12	.647
Buffalo	12	–	4	.750	20	–	11	.645
Ohio†	11	–	5	.688	29	–	8	.784
Kent State	10	–	6	.625	21	–	12	.636
Bowling Green	9	–	7	.563	16	–	16	.500
Miami	5	–	11	.313	9	–	21	.300
West
Eastern Michigan	9	–	7	.563	14	–	18	.438
Toledo	7	–	9	.438	19	–	17	.528
Western Michigan	6	–	10	.375	14	–	20	.412
Ball State	6	–	10	.375	15	–	15	.500
Central Michigan	5	–	11	.313	11	–	21	.344
Northern Illinois	3	–	13	.188	5	–	26	.161
† 2012 MAC tournament winner As of March 23, 2012; Rankings from AP Poll

2011–12 MEAC men's basketball standings
	Conf.				Overall
Team	W		L	PCT	W		L	PCT
Savannah State	14	–	2	.875	21	–	12	.636
Norfolk State †	13	–	3	.813	26	–	10	.722
Delaware State	12	–	4	.750	15	–	14	.517
Bethune–Cookman	11	–	5	.688	18	–	17	.514
North Carolina Central	10	–	6	.625	17	–	15	.531
Coppin State	9	–	7	.563	14	–	16	.467
North Carolina A&T	7	–	9	.438	12	–	20	.375
Hampton	6	–	10	.375	12	–	21	.364
Morgan State	6	–	10	.375	9	–	20	.310
Howard	6	–	10	.375	10	–	21	.323
Florida A&M	6	–	10	.375	10	–	23	.303
Maryland Eastern Shore	4	–	12	.250	7	–	23	.233
South Carolina State	0	–	16	.000	5	–	26	.161
† 2012 MEAC tournament winner As of March 16, 2012; Rankings from AP Poll

2011–12 Missouri Valley Conference men's basketball standings
	Conf.				Overall
Team	W		L	PCT	W		L	PCT
No. 16 Wichita State	16	–	2	.889	27	–	5	.844
No. 19 Creighton †	14	–	4	.778	28	–	5	.848
Evansville	9	–	9	.500	16	–	16	.500
Illinois State	9	–	9	.500	21	–	14	.600
Northern Iowa	9	–	9	.500	20	–	14	.588
Missouri State	9	–	9	.500	16	–	16	.500
Drake	9	–	9	.500	18	–	16	.529
Indiana State	8	–	10	.444	18	–	15	.545
Southern Illinois	5	–	13	.278	8	–	23	.258
Bradley	2	–	16	.111	7	–	25	.219
† 2012 MVC tournament winner As of March 19, 2012; Rankings from AP Poll

2011–12 Mountain West Conference men's basketball standings
	Conf.				Overall
Team	W		L	PCT	W		L	PCT
No. 21 New Mexico †	10	–	4	.714	28	–	7	.800
No. 22 San Diego St	10	–	4	.714	26	–	8	.765
No. 23 UNLV	9	–	5	.643	26	–	9	.743
Colorado State	8	–	6	.571	20	–	12	.625
TCU	7	–	7	.500	18	–	15	.545
Wyoming	6	–	8	.429	21	–	12	.636
Air Force	3	–	11	.214	13	–	16	.448
Boise State	3	–	11	.214	13	–	17	.433
† 2012 MWC tournament winner As of March 8, 2012; Rankings from AP Poll

2011–12 Northeast Conference men's basketball standings
	Conf.				Overall
Team	W		L	PCT	W		L	PCT
Long Island †	16	–	2	.889	25	–	9	.735
Wagner	15	–	3	.833	25	–	6	.806
Robert Morris	13	–	5	.722	26	–	10	.722
St. Francis (NY)	12	–	6	.667	15	–	15	.500
Quinnipiac	10	–	8	.556	18	–	14	.563
Monmouth	10	–	8	.556	12	–	20	.375
Central Connecticut	10	–	8	.556	13	–	16	.448
Sacred Heart	8	–	10	.444	14	–	18	.438
Mount St. Mary's	6	–	12	.333	8	–	21	.276
Saint Francis (PA)	5	–	13	.278	6	–	23	.207
Fairleigh Dickinson	2	–	16	.111	3	–	26	.103
*Bryant	1	–	17	.056	2	–	28	.067
† 2012 Northeast Conference tournament winner As of March 17, 2012; Rankings from AP Poll; *Ineligible for conference tournament

2011–12 Ohio Valley Conference men's basketball standings
	Conf.				Overall
Team	W		L	PCT	W		L	PCT
No. 12 Murray State †	15	–	1	.938	31	–	2	.939
Tennessee State	11	–	5	.688	20	–	13	.606
Morehead State	10	–	6	.625	18	–	15	.545
Tennessee Tech	9	–	7	.563	19	–	14	.576
Southeast Missouri State	9	–	7	.563	15	–	16	.484
Austin Peay	8	–	8	.500	12	–	20	.375
Jacksonville State	8	–	8	.500	15	–	18	.455
Eastern Kentucky	7	–	9	.438	16	–	16	.500
*SIU Edwardsville	6	–	10	.375	10	–	17	.370
Eastern Illinois	5	–	11	.313	12	–	17	.414
UT Martin	0	–	16	.000	4	–	27	.129
† 2012 Ohio Valley Conference tournament winner As of March 15, 2012; Rankings from AP Poll * Ineligible for conference tournament

2011–12 Pac-12 Conference men's basketball standings
	Conf.				Overall
Team	W		L	PCT	W		L	PCT
Washington	14	–	4	.778	24	–	11	.686
California	13	–	5	.722	24	–	10	.706
Oregon	13	–	5	.722	24	–	10	.706
Arizona	12	–	6	.667	23	–	12	.657
Colorado †	11	–	7	.611	24	–	12	.667
UCLA	11	–	7	.611	19	–	14	.576
Stanford	10	–	8	.556	26	–	11	.703
Oregon State	7	–	11	.389	21	–	15	.583
Washington State	7	–	11	.389	19	–	18	.514
Arizona State	6	–	12	.333	10	–	21	.323
Utah	3	–	15	.167	6	–	25	.194
USC	1	–	17	.056	6	–	26	.188
† Conference tournament winner As of March 8, 2012; Rankings from AP poll

2011–12 Patriot League men's basketball standings
	Conf.				Overall
Team	W		L	PCT	W		L	PCT
Bucknell	12	–	2	.857	25	–	10	.714
Lehigh†	11	–	3	.786	27	–	8	.771
American	10	–	4	.714	20	–	12	.625
Holy Cross	9	–	5	.643	15	–	14	.517
Lafayette	7	–	7	.500	13	–	18	.419
Army	5	–	9	.357	12	–	18	.400
Colgate	2	–	12	.143	8	–	22	.267
Navy	0	–	14	.000	3	–	26	.103
† 2012 Patriot League tournament winner

2011–12 Southeastern Conference men's basketball standings
	Conf.				Overall
Team	W		L	PCT	W		L	PCT
No. 1 Kentucky	16	–	0	1.000	38	–	2	.950
No. 25 Florida	10	–	6	.625	26	–	11	.703
No. 20 Vanderbilt †	10	–	6	.625	25	–	11	.694
Tennessee	10	–	6	.625	19	–	15	.559
Alabama	9	–	7	.563	21	–	12	.636
Mississippi State	8	–	8	.500	21	–	12	.636
Ole Miss	8	–	8	.500	20	–	14	.588
LSU	7	–	9	.438	18	–	15	.545
Arkansas	6	–	10	.375	18	–	14	.563
Auburn	5	–	11	.313	15	–	16	.484
Georgia	5	–	11	.313	15	–	17	.469
South Carolina	2	–	14	.125	10	–	21	.323
† 2012 SEC tournament winner As of April 2, 2012; Rankings from AP poll

2011–12 Southern Conference men's basketball standings
	Conf.				Overall
Team	W		L	PCT	W		L	PCT
North
UNC Greensboro	10	–	8	.556	13	–	19	.406
Elon	9	–	9	.500	15	–	16	.484
Samford	8	–	10	.444	11	–	19	.367
Western Carolina	8	–	10	.444	17	–	18	.486
Appalachian State	7	–	11	.389	13	–	18	.419
Chattanooga	5	–	13	.278	11	–	21	.344
South
Davidson†	16	–	2	.889	25	–	8	.758
Georgia Southern	12	–	6	.667	15	–	15	.500
Wofford	12	–	6	.667	19	–	14	.576
College of Charleston	10	–	8	.556	19	–	12	.613
Furman	8	–	10	.444	15	–	16	.484
The Citadel	3	–	15	.167	6	–	24	.200
† SoCon tournament winner As of March 15, 2012; Rankings from AP Poll

2011–12 Southland Conference men's basketball standings
	Conf.				Overall
Team	W		L	PCT	W		L	PCT
East
Lamar†	11	–	5	.688	23	–	12	.657
McNeese State	10	–	6	.625	17	–	16	.515
Northwestern State	8	–	8	.500	16	–	16	.500
Nicholls State	6	–	10	.375	10	–	20	.333
Southeastern Louisiana	5	–	11	.313	12	–	17	.414
Central Arkansas	3	–	13	.188	8	–	21	.276
West
Texas–Arlington	15	–	1	.938	24	–	9	.727
Stephen F. Austin	12	–	4	.750	20	–	12	.625
UTSA	10	–	6	.625	18	–	14	.563
Sam Houston State	7	–	9	.438	13	–	19	.406
Texas State	5	–	11	.313	13	–	17	.433
Texas A&M–Corpus Christi	4	–	12	.250	6	–	24	.200
† 2012 Southland tournament winner As of March 14, 2012; Rankings from AP poll

2011–12 SWAC men's basketball standings
	Conf.				Overall
Team	W		L	PCT	W		L	PCT
Mississippi Valley State †	17	–	1	.944	21	–	13	.618
*Southern	13	–	5	.722	17	–	14	.548
Texas Southern	12	–	6	.667	15	–	18	.455
Prairie View A&M	10	–	8	.556	14	–	18	.438
Arkansas–Pine Bluff	9	–	9	.500	11	–	22	.333
Alabama State	9	–	9	.500	12	–	19	.387
Alcorn State	6	–	12	.333	10	–	22	.313
Alabama A&M	5	–	13	.278	7	–	21	.250
Jackson State	5	–	13	.278	7	–	24	.226
*Grambling State	4	–	14	.222	4	–	24	.143
† 2012 SWAC tournament winner As of March 13, 2012; Rankings from AP Poll; *Ineligible for conference tournament due to low APR

2011–12 Summit League men's basketball standings
	Conf.				Overall
Team	W		L	PCT	W		L	PCT
Oral Roberts	17	–	1	.944	27	–	7	.794
South Dakota State †	15	–	3	.833	27	–	8	.771
Oakland	11	–	7	.611	20	–	16	.556
Western Illinois	9	–	9	.500	18	–	15	.545
North Dakota State	9	–	9	.500	17	–	14	.548
Southern Utah	8	–	10	.444	14	–	17	.452
IUPUI	7	–	11	.389	14	–	18	.438
South Dakota *	5	–	13	.278	10	–	18	.357
IPFW	5	–	13	.278	11	–	19	.367
UMKC	4	–	14	.222	10	–	21	.323
† 2012 Summit League tournament winner Rankings from AP Poll * Ineligible for conference tournament

2011–12 Sun Belt Conference men's basketball standings
	Conf.				Overall
Team	W		L	PCT	W		L	PCT
East
Middle Tennessee	14	–	2	.875	27	–	7	.794
South Alabama	8	–	8	.500	17	–	12	.586
Florida Atlantic	7	–	9	.438	11	–	19	.367
Western Kentucky†	7	–	9	.438	16	–	19	.457
Troy	5	–	11	.313	10	–	18	.357
Florida International	5	–	11	.313	8	–	21	.276
West
Arkansas–Little Rock	12	–	4	.750	15	–	16	.484
Denver	11	–	5	.688	22	–	9	.710
Louisiana–Lafayette	10	–	6	.625	16	–	16	.500
North Texas	9	–	7	.563	18	–	14	.563
Arkansas State	6	–	10	.375	14	–	20	.412
*Louisiana–Monroe	2	–	14	.125	3	–	26	.103
† 2012 Sun Belt Tournament winner As of March 21, 2012; Rankings from AP Poll; *Ineligible for conference tournament

2011–12 West Coast Conference men's basketball standings
	Conf.				Overall
Team	W		L	PCT	W		L	PCT
No. 24 Saint Mary's†	14	–	2	.875	27	–	6	.818
Gonzaga	13	–	3	.813	26	–	7	.788
BYU	12	–	4	.750	26	–	9	.743
Loyola Marymount	11	–	5	.688	21	–	13	.618
San Francisco	8	–	8	.500	20	–	14	.588
San Diego	7	–	9	.438	13	–	18	.419
Pepperdine	4	–	12	.250	10	–	19	.345
Portland	3	–	13	.188	7	–	24	.226
Santa Clara	0	–	16	.000	8	–	22	.267
† Conference tournament winner Rankings from AP poll

2011–12 WAC men's basketball standings
	Conf.				Overall
Team	W		L	PCT	W		L	PCT
Nevada	13	–	1	.929	28	–	7	.800
New Mexico State†	10	–	4	.714	26	–	10	.722
Idaho	9	–	5	.643	19	–	14	.576
Utah State	8	–	6	.571	21	–	16	.568
Louisiana Tech	6	–	8	.429	18	–	16	.529
Hawaii	6	–	8	.429	16	–	16	.500
Fresno State	3	–	11	.214	13	–	20	.394
San Jose State	1	–	13	.071	9	–	22	.290
† 2012 WAC tournament winner Rankings from AP poll

=== Division I independents ===
Four schools played as Division I independents, although Nebraska–Omaha was in transition from NCAA Division II and not yet considered a full Division I school. Antwan Carter of Longwood was named Independent Player of the Year.

2011–12 NCAA Division I men's basketball independents standings
	Conf.				Overall
Team	W		L	PCT	W		L	PCT
Cal State Bakersfield		–		–	16	–	15	.516
Seattle		–		–	12	–	15	.444
Nebraska–Omaha		–		–	11	–	18	.379
Longwood		–		–	10	–	21	.323
Rankings from AP Poll

=== Informal championships ===
Conference	Regular season winner	Most Valuable Player
Philadelphia Big 5	St. Joseph's & Temple	Zack Rosen, Penn

St. Joseph's and Temple finished with 3–1 records in head-to-head competition among the Philadelphia Big 5.

=== Statistical leaders ===
Source for additional stats categories

Points per game			Rebounds per game			Assists per game			Steals per game		
Player	School	PPG	Player	School	RPG	Player	School	APG	Player	School	SPG
Reggie Hamilton	Oakland	26.2	O. D. Anosike	Siena	12.5	Scott Machado	Iona	9.9	Fuquan Edwin	Seton Hall	3.0
Damian Lillard	Weber St.	24.5	Thomas Robinson	Kansas	11.9	Kendall Marshall	N. Carolina	9.8	Jay Threatt	Delaware St.	3.0
Doug McDermott	Creighton	22.9	André Roberson	Colorado	11.1	Jesse Sanders	Liberty	8.0	T. J. McConnell	Duquesne	2.8
Shane Gibson	Sacred Heart	22.0	Drew Gordon	N. Mexico	11.1	Vincent Council	Providence	7.5	Jeremy Allen	FIU	2.7
CJ McCollum	Lehigh	21.9	Jamelle Hagins	Delaware	11.1	Jason Brickman	LIU Brooklyn	7.3	CJ McCollum	Lehigh	2.6

Blocked shots per game			Field goal percentage			Three-point field goal percentage			Free throw percentage		
Player	School	BPG	Player	School	FG%	Player	School	3FG%	Player	School	FT%
Anthony Davis	Kentucky	4.7	Ricardo Ratliffe	Missouri	69.3	Nick Barbour	High Point	48.4	Robby Ptacek	C. Conn. St.	92.0
William Mosley	Northwestern St.	4.1	Mike Glover	Iona	63.7	Drew Hanlen	Belmont	48.2	E. J. Singler	Oregon	90.9
Damian Eargle	Youngstown St.	3.7	Anthony Davis	Kentucky	62.3	Reggie Chamberlain	UMKC	47.1	Scott Christopherson	Iowa St.	90.3
Jeff Withey	Kansas	3.6	Cody Zeller	Indiana	62.3	Langston Galloway	St. Joseph's	46.6	Brian Barbour	Columbia	90.1
C. J. Aiken	St. Joseph's	3.5	Scott Eatherton	St. Francis (PA)	61.4	Ceola Clark	W. Illinois	46.6	Austin Morgan	Yale	90.0

== Postseason tournaments ==
=== NCAA tournament ===
==== Final Four – Mercedes-Benz Superdome, New Orleans, Louisiana ====
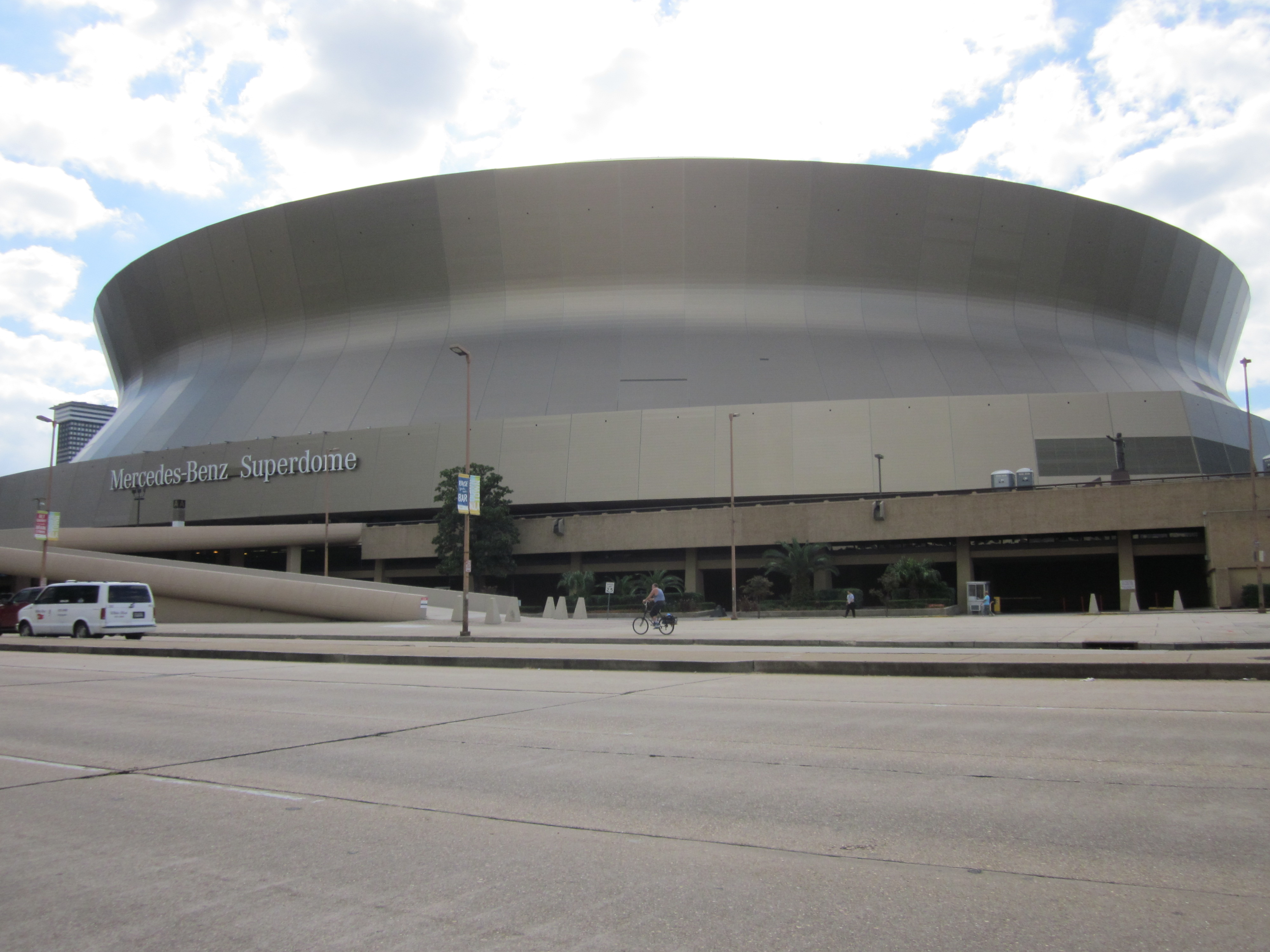
The Mercedes-Benz Superdome in New Orleans, Louisiana, hosted the NCAA men's Final Four. This was the same venue that hosted the BCS National Championship Game that same year.

National Semifinals; March 31
S1	Kentucky	69
W4	Louisville	61
E2	Ohio State	62
M2	Kansas	64

National Championship Game; April 2
S1	Kentucky	67
M2	Kansas	59

==== Tournament upsets ====
For this list, a "major upset" is defined as a win by a team seeded 7 or more spots below its defeated opponent.

Date	Winner	Score	Loser
March 15	VCU (#12, South)	62–59	Wichita State (#5, South)
March 16	Norfolk State (#15, West)	86–84	Missouri (#2, West)
March 16	Ohio (#13, Midwest)	65–60	Michigan (#4, Midwest)
March 16	Lehigh (#15, South)	75–70	Duke (#2, South)
March 16	South Florida (#12, Midwest)	58–44	Temple (#5, Midwest)
March 18	NC State (#11, Midwest)	66–63	Georgetown (#3, Midwest)

=== National Invitation tournament ===
After the NCAA Tournament field was announced, the NCAA invited 32 teams to participate in the National Invitation Tournament. The tournament began on March 13, with all games prior to the semifinals played on campus sites. The semifinals and final were respectively held on March 27 and 29 at the traditional site of Madison Square Garden.

==== NIT Semifinals and Final ====
Played at Madison Square Garden in New York City

Semifinals; March 27, 2012
1	Washington	67
6	Minnesota	68^{OT}
5	UMass	64
3	Stanford	74

Championship game March 29, 2012
6	Minnesota	51
3	Stanford	75

=== College Basketball Invitational ===
The fifth College Basketball Invitational (CBI) Tournament was held beginning March 13 and ended with a best-of-three final, which went to the maximum number of games and ended on March 30.

Semifinals; March 31, 2012
Washington State	72
Oregon State	55
Pittsburgh	68^{OT}
Butler	62

Championship Series; March 26, 28, 30
Washington State	67	53	65
Pittsburgh	66	57	71

=== CollegeInsider.com Postseason tournament ===
The fourth CollegeInsider.com Postseason Tournament was held beginning March 15 and ended with a championship game on March 28. This tournament places an emphasis on selecting successful teams from "mid-major" conferences who were left out of the NCAA Tournament and NIT.

Semifinals; March 24, 25
1	Mercer	64
4	Fairfield	59
3	Oakland	81
2	Utah State	105

Championship; March 28
Mercer	70
Utah State	67

== Award winners ==
=== Consensus All-American teams ===
The following players are recognized as the 2012 Consensus All-Americans:

Consensus First Team
Player	Position	Class	Team
Anthony Davis	C-PF	Freshman	Kentucky
Draymond Green	PF-C	Senior	Michigan State
Doug McDermott	G-F	Sophomore	Creighton
Thomas Robinson	F	Junior	Kansas
Jared Sullinger	PF-C	Sophomore	Ohio State

Consensus Second Team
Player	Position	Class	Team
Isaiah Canaan	G	Junior	Murray State
Marcus Denmon	G	Senior	Missouri
Kevin Jones	F	Junior	West Virginia
Michael Kidd-Gilchrist	SF-SG	Freshman	Kentucky
Tyler Zeller	PF-C	Senior	North Carolina

=== Major player of the year awards ===
- Wooden Award: Anthony Davis, Kentucky
- Naismith Award: Anthony Davis, Kentucky
- Associated Press Player of the Year: Anthony Davis, Kentucky
- NABC Player of the Year: Draymond Green, Michigan State
- Oscar Robertson Trophy (USBWA): Anthony Davis, Kentucky
- Adolph Rupp Trophy: Anthony Davis, Kentucky
- Sporting News Player of the Year: Anthony Davis, Kentucky

=== Major freshman of the year awards ===
- Wayman Tisdale Award (USBWA): Anthony Davis, Kentucky
- Sporting News Freshman of the Year: Anthony Davis, Kentucky

=== Major coach of the year awards ===
- Associated Press Coach of the Year: Frank Haith, Missouri
- Henry Iba Award (USBWA): Frank Haith, Missouri
- NABC Coach of the Year: Tom Izzo, Michigan State
- Naismith College Coach of the Year: Bill Self, Kansas
- Adolph Rupp Cup: Bill Self, Kansas
- Sporting News Coach of the Year: Bill Self, Kansas

=== Other major awards ===
- Bob Cousy Award (Best point guard): Kendall Marshall, North Carolina
- Pete Newell Big Man Award (Best big man): Anthony Davis, Kentucky
- NABC Defensive Player of the Year: Anthony Davis, Kentucky
- Frances Pomeroy Naismith Award (Best senior 6'0"/1.83 m or shorter): Reggie Hamilton, Oakland
- Lowe's Senior CLASS Award (top senior): Robbie Hummel, Purdue
- Robert V. Geasey Trophy (Top player in Philadelphia Big 5): Zack Rosen, Penn
- NIT/Haggerty Award (Top player in New York City metro area): Scott Machado, Iona
- Ben Jobe Award (Top minority coach): Sean Woods, Mississippi Valley State
- Hugh Durham Award (Top mid-major coach): Eddie Payne, USC Upstate
- Jim Phelan Award (Top head coach): Mike Brey, Notre Dame
- Lefty Driesell Award (Top defensive player): Anthony Davis, Kentucky
- Lou Henson Award (Top mid-major player): Kyle O'Quinn, Norfolk State
- Lute Olson Award (Top non-freshman or transfer player): Doug McDermott, Creighton
- Skip Prosser Man of the Year Award (Coach with moral character): Jimmy Patsos, Loyola (MD)
- Academic All-American of the Year (Top scholar-athlete): Tyler Zeller, North Carolina
- Elite 89 Award (Top GPA at Final Four): Aaron Craft, Ohio State

== Coaching changes ==
A number of teams changed coaches during and after the season.

Team	Former coach	Interim coach	New coach	Reason
Air Force	Jeff Reynolds		Dave Pilopovich	Reynolds was fired February 8. ESPN wrote that "His intensity on the bench began to rub the Falcons the wrong way, zapping the fun from the game." Dave Pilopovich was named interim coach, then later given the job permanently.
Binghamton	Mark Macon		Tommy Dempsey	Macon compiled a 24-68 record in his three seasons as head coach, including a 2-29 mark last winter, 1-15 in America East Conference play
Brown	Jesse Agel		Mike Martin	Agel was fired after his fourth season following an 8–23 season.
Cal State Fullerton	Bob Burton	Andy Newman	Dedrique Taylor	Burton resigned on June 22 and assistant Newman was named interim head coach for the 2012–13 season.
Canisius	Tom Parrotta		Jim Baron	In six seasons as the Griffs' head coach, Parrotta posted a career record of 64–121 and a 30–78 mark in Metro Atlantic Athletic Conference play. The team went 5–25 overall and 1–17 in league during the 2011–12 campaign.
Central Michigan	Ernie Zeigler		Keno Davis	Zeigler was 75–111 over six seasons. He was given a new, four-year contract two years ago when he was just about to sign his son, Trey, to a scholarship to play for the Chippewas.
College of Charleston	Bobby Cremins		Doug Wojcik	Cremins announced his retirement on Monday, March 19 at the College of Charleston. Cremins had coached at the school for six seasons after retiring from Georgia Tech, but took a leave of absence in late January due to exhaustion.
Colorado State	Tim Miles		Larry Eustachy	Miles resigned on March 23 to take the job at Nebraska. Miles led the Rams to the NCAA tournament and a fourth-place finish in the Mountain West (8–6) and a 20–12 overall record. Miles spent five years with the Rams and improved the win total every season from seven to nine to 16 to 19 to 20. He also went to the CBI, NIT and now the NCAA tournament.
Duquesne	Ron Everhart		Jim Ferry	Everhart was 98–88 in six seasons with Duquesne, going 46–50 in Atlantic 10 play. Questions began to surface when three members of the team – including sophomore point guard T.J. McConnell, the team's best overall player – announced intentions to transfer.
Eastern Illinois	Mike Miller		Jay Spoonhour	Miller compiled a 75–130 overall record and a 44–84 mark in the Ohio Valley Conference in seven seasons at Eastern Illinois. The Panthers hired Jay Spoonhour, a successful junior college coach and son of Charlie Spoonhour, a longtime college coach who died in February 2012.
FIU	Isiah Thomas		Richard Pitino	Thomas went 26-65 in three seasons. Under Thomas, FIU never won more than 11 games in a season. The Golden Panthers hired Pitino, who had been associate head coach at Louisville under his father Rick.
Grambling State	Bobby Washington		Joseph Price	Grambling reassigned Washington to another role within the university.
Idaho State	Joe O'Brien	Deane Martin	Bill Evans	O'Brien resigned as Bengals coach in a move announced December 19, 2011.
Illinois	Bruce Weber		John Groce	Weber coached the Illini for nine years, posting a 210–101 record and seven 20-win seasons. However, the Illini missed the NCAA Tournament three of the last five years, and won only two tournament games since reaching the national championship game in 2005.
Illinois State	Tim Jankovich		Dan Muller	Jankovich left Illinois State to become Associate head coach and coach-in-waiting at SMU.
Kansas State	Frank Martin		Bruce Weber	Martin left to take the South Carolina job.
Long Island	Jim Ferry		Jack Perri	Ferry left to take the Duquesne job. Assistant coach Jack Perri was appointed the new head coach on April 10, 2012.
LSU	Trent Johnson		Johnny Jones	Johnson left LSU to take the TCU job.
Miami (OH)	Charlie Coles		John Cooper	Coles retired after 16 years at Miami.
Mississippi State	Rick Stansbury		Rick Ray	Stansbury retired after 14 years at Mississippi State, Stansbury led the Bulldogs to a 293–166 record, including 11 postseason appearances – but last went to the NCAA tournament in 2009.
Mississippi Valley State	Sean Woods		Chico Potts	Woods left to take the Morehead State job.
Morehead State	Donnie Tyndall		Sean Woods	Tyndall left to take the Southern Miss job.
Mount St. Mary's	Robert Burke	Matt Henry	Jamion Christian	Burke was placed on administrative leave and Henry was named acting head coach on February 15. Burke formally resigned at the end of the season.
Nebraska	Doc Sadler		Tim Miles	Sadler was 89–70 overall and 34–64 in league play in the six years at Nebraska.
North Carolina A&T	Jerry Eaves		Cy Alexander	Eaves' contract with the school expires May 30, 2013. Eaves finishes his tenure at A&T with a 99–180 record over nine seasons. He is third on the program's all-time wins list.
North Texas	Johnny Jones		Tony Benford	Jones left to take the LSU job.
Northern Arizona	Mike Adras	Dave Brown	Jack Murphy	Adras resigned as head coach to pursue other opportunities. After a disastrous season that ended with a 16-game losing streak, new AD Lisa Campos hired Murphy, who spent the last three years as an assistant with Memphis.
Ohio	John Groce		Jim Christian	Groce left to take the Illinois job.
Rhode Island	Jim Baron		Dan Hurley	Baron was fired after the Rams finished 7–24 overall 4–12 in A-10 play and failed to qualify for the league tournament. Dan Hurley was named the new coach on March 21, 2012.
Rider	Tommy Dempsey		Kevin Baggett	Dempsey took the open position at Binghamton after the season ended.
Saint Francis (PA)	Don Friday		Rob Krimmel	Friday was let go and replaced by Krimmel - son of Saint Francis athletic director Bob Krimmel.
Samford	Jimmy Tillette		Bennie Seltzer	Tillette was the winningest coach in Samford history with an overall record of 229–219. He took the Bulldogs to the NCAA Tournament in 1999 and 2000. The program had struggled since its transition to the Southern Conference.
SMU	Matt Doherty		Larry Brown	Doherty went 80–109 in six season with the Mustangs and just 30–67 in conference play. SMU finished 13–19 this season and lost 11 of its final 14 games.
South Carolina	Darrin Horn		Frank Martin	Horn was fired after the Gamecocks lost 24 of their last 27 SEC games. Horn finishes his career at South Carolina 23–45 in league games and 60–63 overall with three losing seasons in a row.
Southern Illinois	Chris Lowery		Barry Hinson	Lowery had been under fire for the last couple years as the program deteriorated and ultimately bottomed out with an 8–23 record this season – a school record for losses in a season.
Southern Miss	Larry Eustachy		Donnie Tyndall	Eustachy left to take the Colorado State job.
Southern Utah	Roger Reid		Nick Robinson	After almost forty years of coaching basketball, Reid announced his retirement as head men's basketball coach at Southern Utah. He retires with an overall Division I record of 205–173, including a 54–97 record at SUU.
TCU	Jim Christian		Trent Johnson	Christian accepted the job at Ohio, Christian has gone 56-73 in four seasons at the helm, but had success in his six years at Kent State.
Tennessee State	John Cooper		Travis Williams	Cooper left to take the Miami (OH) job.
Texas Southern	Tony Harvey		Mike Davis (Interim)	Harvey's resignation was announced July 3, 2012.
Tulsa	Doug Wojcik		Danny Manning	Wojcik, compiled a career record of 140–92 in his seven seasons at Tulsa and became the school's all-time leader in coaching victories last month. The lack of an NCAA Tournament appearance and a deteriorating fan base may have weighed heavily against Wojcik.
UAB	Mike Davis		Jerod Haase	Davis said he was told he was fired because of poor ticket sales and attendance.
UNC Greensboro	Mike Dement		Wes Miller	Dement stepped aside as Spartans coach in a move announced on December 13, 2011.
Virginia Tech	Seth Greenberg		James Johnson	Greenberg was let go on April 23 after significant turnover from his coaching staff.
Wagner	Dan Hurley		Bashir Mason	Hurley left to take the Rhode Island job. The Seahawks elevated assistant Mason to the top job, making him the current youngest Division I men's head coach at age 28.
Western Kentucky	Ken McDonald		Ray Harper	On January 6, McDonald was released from his contract, citing lackluster attendance and a 5–11 start to the season. Ray Harper was named interim coach, then later given the job permanently.
Winthrop	Randy Peele		Pat Kelsey	Peele was fired after Winthrop finished with a losing record for the second consecutive season – the first time the Eagles had back-to-back losing seasons since 1997 and 1998.
