= 2011–12 North Texas Mean Green men's basketball team =

American college basketball season

2011–12 North Texas Mean Green men's basketball
- Conference: Sun Belt Conference
- West Division
- Record: 18–14 (9–7 Sun Belt)
- Head coach: Johnny Jones (11th season)
- Assistant coaches: Shawn Forrest; Bill Foy; Charlie Leonard
- Home arena: UNT Coliseum

2011–12 Sun Belt Conference men's basketball standings
	Conf.				Overall
Team	W		L	PCT	W		L	PCT
East
Middle Tennessee	14	–	2	.875	27	–	7	.794
South Alabama	8	–	8	.500	17	–	12	.586
Florida Atlantic	7	–	9	.438	11	–	19	.367
Western Kentucky†	7	–	9	.438	16	–	19	.457
Troy	5	–	11	.313	10	–	18	.357
Florida International	5	–	11	.313	8	–	21	.276
West
Arkansas–Little Rock	12	–	4	.750	15	–	16	.484
Denver	11	–	5	.688	22	–	9	.710
Louisiana–Lafayette	10	–	6	.625	16	–	16	.500
North Texas	9	–	7	.563	18	–	14	.563
Arkansas State	6	–	10	.375	14	–	20	.412
*Louisiana–Monroe	2	–	14	.125	3	–	26	.103
† 2012 Sun Belt Tournament winner As of March 21, 2012; Rankings from AP Poll; *Ineligible for conference tournament

The 2011–12 North Texas Mean Green men's basketball team represented the University of North Texas during the 2011–12 NCAA Division I men's basketball season. The Mean Green, led by 11th year head coach Johnny Jones, played their home games at UNT Coliseum, nicknamed The Super Pit, and are members of the West Division of the Sun Belt Conference. They finished the season 18–14, 9–7 in Sun Belt play to finish in fourth place in the West Division. They advanced to the championship game of the Sun Belt Basketball tournament for the third consecutive year before falling to WKU. They did not accept an invitation to a post season tournament.

== Roster ==
Number	Name	Position	Height	Weight	Year	Hometown
1	Jacob Holmen	Forward	6–8	225	Junior	Whitehouse, Texas
2	Brandan Walton	Guard	6–2	195	Junior	Compton, California
3	Alzee Williams	Guard	6–4	175	Sophomore	Dallas, Texas
5	Chris Jones	Guard	6–2	195	Freshman	Garland, Texas
10	Justin Patton	Forward	6–7	195	Senior	Bossier City, Louisiana
11	Forrest Robinson	Forward	6–10	220	Freshman	Eastland, Texas
13	Tony Mitchell	Forward	6–8	235	Freshman	Dallas, Texas
14	Trey Norris	Guard	6–0	175	Freshman	Grand Prairie, Texas
23	Jordan Williams	Guard	6–6	195	Freshman	Dallas, Texas
24	Kedrick Hogans	Forward	6–9	235	Senior	New Orleans, Louisiana
25	Niko Stojiljkovic	Forward	6–9	215	Junior	Paris, France
32	Roger Franklin	Guard	6–5	220	Junior	Duncanville, Texas
33	Tyler Hall	Guard	6–2	175	Senior	Pampa, Texas
34	Alonzo Edwards	Forward	6–7	230	Senior	Houston, Texas

== Schedule ==
Date time, TV	Rank^{#}	Opponent^{#}	Result	Record	Site (attendance) city, state
Exhibition
11/09/2011*; 7:00 pm		Oklahoma City	W 67–54		The Super Pit (3,843); Denton, TX
01/18/2012*; 12:00 pm		Huston–Tillotson	W 98–51		The Super Pit (3,653); Denton, TX
Regular season
11/11/2011*; 7:00 pm		St. Gregory's	W 81–52	1–0	The Super Pit (3,175); Denton, TX
11/16/2011*; 7:00 pm, FSSW		at Texas Tech	L 64–69	1–1	United Spirit Arena (8,614); Lubbock, TX
11/22/2011*; 7:00 pm		at UT Arlington	L 64–97	1–2	Texas Hall (1,388); Arlington, TX
11/27/2011*; 1:30 pm		at No. 24 Mississippi State	L 59–82	1–3	Humphrey Coliseum (7,418); Starkville, MS
11/29/2011*; 7:00 pm, Longhorn Network		at Texas	L 57–73	1–4	Frank Erwin Center (9,488); Austin, TX
12/02/2011*; 4:00 pm		vs. La Sierra; LMU Centennial Classic	W 92–45	2–4	Gersten Pavilion (360); Los Angeles, CA
12/03/2011*; 7:00 pm		vs. Columbia; LMU Centennial Classic	L 57–72	2–5	Gersten Pavilion (2,195); Los Angeles, CA
12/04/2011*; 3:30 pm		at Loyola Marymount; LMU Centennial Classic	W 76–63	3–5	Gersten Pavilion (1,913); Los Angeles, CA
12/10/2011*; 7:00 pm		Sam Houston State	W 53–50	4–5	The Super Pit (3,313); Denton, TX
12/18/2011*; 7:00 pm		Jackson State	W 69–55	5–5	The Super Pit (3,146); Denton, TX
12/20/2011*; 7:00 pm		Grambling State	W 82–40	6–5	The Super Pit (2,732); Denton, TX
12/22/2011*; 7:00 pm		LSU	L 58–67	6–6	The Super Pit (6,838); Denton, TX
12/27/2011*; 7:00 pm		New Orleans	W 78–47	7–6	The Super Pit (2,617); Denton, TX
12/29/2011; 7:00 pm		Arkansas–Little Rock	L 66–69	7–7 (0–1)	The Super Pit (2,825); Denton, TX
12/31/2011; 3:00 pm		Troy	W 87–65	8–7 (1–1)	The Super Pit (2,747); Denton, TX
01/05/2012; 7:00 pm		at South Alabama	W 78–73 ^{OT}	9–7 (2–1)	Mitchell Center (1,592); Mobile, AL
01/07/2012; 7:00 pm		at Arkansas State	L 72–75	9–8 (2–2)	Convocation Center (2,276); Jonesboro, AR
01/12/2012; 7:00 pm		WKU	W 84–67	10–8 (3–2)	The Super Pit (3,941); Denton, TX
01/14/2012; 1:00 pm		at Louisiana–Monroe	W 68–55	11–8 (4–2)	Fant–Ewing Coliseum (1,166); Monroe, LA
01/21/2012; 7:00 pm		Denver	W 75–74 ^{OT}	12–8 (5–2)	The Super Pit (4,859); Denton, TX
01/25/2012; 7:15 pm		at Louisiana–Lafayette	L 62–64	12–9 (5–3)	Cajundome (3,673); Lafayette, LA
01/28/2012; 12:00 pm, Sun Belt Network		Arkansas State	W 76–64	13–9 (6–3)	The Super Pit (3,643); Denton, TX
02/02/2012; 7:00 pm		Middle Tennessee	L 66–68	13–10 (6–4)	The Super Pit (5,510); Denton, TX
02/09/2012; 6:00 pm, Sun Belt Network		at Florida International	W 68–61	14–10 (7–4)	U.S. Century Bank Arena (798); Miami, FL
02/11/2012; 6:00 pm		at Florida Atlantic	L 81–86 ^{2OT}	14–11 (7–5)	FAU Arena (1,876); Boca, Raton
02/16/2012; 7:00 pm		Louisiana–Monroe	W 86–51	15–11 (8–5)	The Super Pit (3,810); Denton, TX
02/18/2012; 7:00 pm, Sun Belt Network		Louisiana–Lafayette	L 53–57	15–12 (8–6)	The Super Pit (6,921); Denton, TX
02/23/2012; 7:00 pm		at Arkansas–Little Rock	W 75–67 ^{OT}	16–12 (9–6)	Jack Stephens Center (3,941); Little Rock, AR
02/26/2012; 2:00 pm		at Denver	L 52–64	16–13 (9–7)	Magness Arena (4,453); Denver, CO
2012 Sun Belt Conference men's basketball tournament
03/04/2012; 6:15 pm		vs. Louisiana–Lafayette; Quarterfinals	W 65–62	17–13	Convention Center Court (4,365); Hot Springs, AR
03/05/2012; 6:00 pm, Sun Belt Network		vs. Arkansas State; Semifinals	W 76–72	18–13	Summit Arena (3,708); Hot Springs, AR
03/06/2012; 6:00 pm, ESPN2		vs. WKU; Championship Game	L 70–74	18–14	Summit Arena (4,216); Hot Springs, AR
*Non-conference game. ^{#}Rankings from AP Poll. (#) Tournament seedings in parentheses. All times are in Central Time.
