= 2011–12 Louisiana–Lafayette Ragin' Cajuns men's basketball team =

American college basketball season

2011–12 Louisiana–Lafayette Ragin' Cajuns men's basketball

CIT, First Round
- Conference: Sun Belt Conference
- West Division
- Record: 16–16 (10–6 Sun Belt)
- Head coach: Bob Marlin (2nd season)
- Assistant coaches: Neil Hardin; Kevin Johnson; Nikita Johnson; Brock Morris
- Home arena: Cajundome

2011–12 Sun Belt Conference men's basketball standings
	Conf.				Overall
Team	W		L	PCT	W		L	PCT
East
Middle Tennessee	14	–	2	.875	27	–	7	.794
South Alabama	8	–	8	.500	17	–	12	.586
Florida Atlantic	7	–	9	.438	11	–	19	.367
Western Kentucky†	7	–	9	.438	16	–	19	.457
Troy	5	–	11	.313	10	–	18	.357
Florida International	5	–	11	.313	8	–	21	.276
West
Arkansas–Little Rock	12	–	4	.750	15	–	16	.484
Denver	11	–	5	.688	22	–	9	.710
Louisiana–Lafayette	10	–	6	.625	16	–	16	.500
North Texas	9	–	7	.563	18	–	14	.563
Arkansas State	6	–	10	.375	14	–	20	.412
*Louisiana–Monroe	2	–	14	.125	3	–	26	.103
† 2012 Sun Belt Tournament winner As of March 21, 2012; Rankings from AP Poll; *Ineligible for conference tournament

The 2011–12 Louisiana–Lafayette Ragin' Cajuns men's basketball team represented the University of Louisiana at Lafayette during the 2011–12 NCAA Division I men's basketball season. The Ragin' Cajuns, led by second year head coach Bob Marlin, played their home games at the Cajundome and are members of the West Division of the Sun Belt Conference. They finished the season 16–16, 10–6 in Sun Belt play to finish in third place in the West Division. They lost in the quarterfinals of the Sun Belt Basketball tournament to North Texas. They were invited to the 2012 CollegeInsider.com Tournament where they lost in the first round to Rice.

== Roster ==
2011–12 Louisiana–Lafayette Ragin' Cajuns Men's Basketball Roster
Number	Name	Position	Height	Weight	Year	Hometown
0	Bryant Mbamulu	Guard	6–2	185	Sophomore	Houston, Texas
1	Josh Brown	Guard	6–4	200	Senior	Ruston, Louisiana
2	Elfrid Payton	Guard	6–3	165	Freshman	Gretna, Louisiana
3	Darnell Jackson	Guard	6–3	215	Junior	Savannah, Georgia
4	Scottie Farrington	Forward	6–7	195	Senior	Nassau, Bahamas
5	J.J. Thomas	Forward	6–5	220	Sophomore	Opelousas, Louisiana
11	Donovan Williams	Guard	6–0	180	Freshman	Cecilia, Louisiana
13	Alan-Michael Thompson	Guard	6–1	170	Junior	Florence, South Carolina
15	David Perez	Guard	6–3	200	Senior	New Iberia, Louisiana
20	Kentwan Smith	Forward	6–8	200	Freshman	Piney Woods, Mississippi
21	Darshawn McClellan	Forward	6–7	240	Senior	Fresno, California
22	Raymone Andrews	Guard	6–2	180	Junior	Hammond, Louisiana
23	Kadeem Coleby	Forward/Center	6–9	250	Junior	Nassau, Bahamas
31	Kevin Brown	Guard	6–0	200	Sophomore	Houston, Texas

== Schedule ==
Date time, TV	Rank^{#}	Opponent^{#}	Result	Record	Site (attendance) city, state
Regular season
November 11, 2011*; 10:30 pm		vs. Northern Arizona; San Francisco Hilltop Challenge	W 83–66	1–0	War Memorial Gymnasium (1,175); San Francisco, CA
November 12, 2011*; 10:30 pm		vs. North Dakota State; San Francisco Hilltop Challenge	L 58–78	1–1	War Memorial Gymnasium (1,119); San Francisco, CA
November 13, 2011*; 5:30 pm		at San Francisco; San Francisco Hilltop Challenge	L 70–71	1–2	War Memorial Gymnasium (1,165); San Francisco, CA
November 18, 2011*; 7:30 pm		Houston Baptist; Beryl Shipley Classic	W 73–64	2–2	Cajundome (3,743); Lafayette, LA
November 19, 2011*; 7:30 pm		Cal State Fullerton; Beryl Shipley Classic	L 63–69	2–3	Cajundome (3,670); Lafayette, LA
November 20, 2011*; 3:30 pm		Nicholls State; Beryl Shipley Classic	W 84–57	3–3	Cajundome (3,460); Lafayette, LA
November 26, 2011*; 6:00 pm		at Duquesne	L 65–84	3–4	Palumbo Center (2,393); Pittsburgh, PA
November 28, 2011*; 6:00 pm		at Kent State	L 67–76	3–5	M.A.C. Center (2,638); Kent, OH
December 1, 2011*; 7:00 pm		McNeese State	W 78–56	4–5	Cajundome (3,409); Lafayette, LA
December 3, 2011*; 8:30 pm		at Lamar	L 63–80	4–6	Montagne Center (2,827); Beaumont, TX
December 12, 2011*; 7:00 pm		Dillard	W 102–38	5–6	Cajundome (2,969); Lafayette, LA
December 14, 2011*; 6:00 pm, CSS		at Ole Miss	L 54–66	5–7	Tad Smith Coliseum (4,857); Oxford, MS
December 17, 2011*; 6:00 pm		at Robert Morris	L 64–72	5–8	Charles L. Sewall Center (1,103); Moon Township, PA
December 21, 2011*; 7:00 pm		UCF	W 61–60	6–8	Cajundome (3,132); Lafayette, LA
December 31, 2011; 4:15 pm		Florida Atlantic	W 67–55	7–8 (1–0)	Cajundome (3,379); Lafayette, LA
January 5, 2012; 7:00 pm, FCS		at Western Kentucky	W 72–70 ^{OT}	8–8 (2–0)	E. A. Diddle Arena (2,137); Bowling Green, KY
January 7, 2012; 5:30 pm		at Middle Tennessee	L 53–65	8–9 (2–1)	Murphy Center (4,028); Murfreesboro, TN
January 12, 2012; 7:00 pm		South Alabama	L 65–70	8–10 (2–2)	Cajundome (3,583); Lafayette, LA
January 14, 2012; 7:15 pm		FIU	W 87–81 ^{OT}	9–10 (3–2)	Cajundome (3,707); Lafayette, LA
January 19, 2012; 7:00 pm		at Arkansas–Little Rock	W 68–49	10–10 (4–2)	Jack Stephens Center (3,775); Little Rock, AR
January 21, 2012; 7:00 pm		at Arkansas State	L 74–79	10–11 (4–3)	Convocation Center (3,711); Jonesboro, AR
January 25, 2012; 7:15 pm		North Texas	W 64–62	11–11 (5–3)	Cajundome (3,673); Lafayette, LA
January 28, 2012; 4:00 pm		at Louisiana–Monroe	W 67–60	12–11 (6–3)	Fant–Ewing Coliseum (2,419); Monroe, LA
February 2, 2012; 7:00 pm		Denver	W 72–71 ^{OT}	13–11 (7–3)	Cajundome (3,611); Lafayette, LA
February 4, 2012; 7:30 pm		at Troy	W 83–78	14–11 (8–3)	Trojan Arena (2,168); Troy, AL
February 9, 2012; 7:00 pm		Arkansas–Little Rock	L 70–72 ^{OT}	14–12 (8–4)	Cajundome (4,125); Lafayette, LA
February 11, 2012; 7:15 pm		Arkansas State	W 68–65 ^{OT}	15–12 (9–4)	Cajundome (3,918); Lafayette, LA
February 16, 2012; 6:00 pm		at Denver	L 52–77	15–13 (9–5)	Magness Arena (5,870); Denver, CO
February 18, 2012; 3:30 pm		at North Texas	W 57–53	16–13 (10–5)	The Super Pit (6,921); Denton, TX
February 25, 2012; 7:15 pm		Louisiana–Monroe	L 60–78	16–14 (10–6)	Cajundome (5,075); Lafayette, LA
Sun Belt tournament
March 4, 2012; 6:15 pm	(4)	vs. (5) North Texas; Quarterfinals	L 62–65	16–15	Convention Center Court (4,365); Hot Springs, AR
CollegeInsider.com tournament
March 14, 2012*; 7:00 pm		Rice; First Round	L 63–68	16–16	Cajundome (2,037); Lafayette, LA
*Non-conference game. ^{#}Rankings from AP Poll. (#) Tournament seedings in parentheses. All times are in Central Time.
