= 2011–12 Middle Tennessee Blue Raiders men's basketball team =

American college basketball season

2011–12 Middle Tennessee Blue Raiders men's basketball

Sun Belt East Division and overall regular season champions

NIT, Quarterfinals
- Conference: Sun Belt Conference
- East Division
- Record: 27–7 (14–2 Sun Belt)
- Head coach: Kermit Davis (10th season)
- Assistant coaches: Win Case; Greg Grensing; Monte Towe
- Home arena: Murphy Center

2011–12 Sun Belt Conference men's basketball standings
	Conf.				Overall
Team	W		L	PCT	W		L	PCT
East
Middle Tennessee	14	–	2	.875	27	–	7	.794
South Alabama	8	–	8	.500	17	–	12	.586
Florida Atlantic	7	–	9	.438	11	–	19	.367
Western Kentucky†	7	–	9	.438	16	–	19	.457
Troy	5	–	11	.313	10	–	18	.357
Florida International	5	–	11	.313	8	–	21	.276
West
Arkansas–Little Rock	12	–	4	.750	15	–	16	.484
Denver	11	–	5	.688	22	–	9	.710
Louisiana–Lafayette	10	–	6	.625	16	–	16	.500
North Texas	9	–	7	.563	18	–	14	.563
Arkansas State	6	–	10	.375	14	–	20	.412
*Louisiana–Monroe	2	–	14	.125	3	–	26	.103
† 2012 Sun Belt Tournament winner As of March 21, 2012; Rankings from AP Poll; *Ineligible for conference tournament

The 2011–12 Middle Tennessee Blue Raiders men's basketball team represented Middle Tennessee State University during the 2011–12 NCAA Division I men's basketball season. The Blue Raiders, led by tenth-year head coach Kermit Davis, played their home games at the Murphy Center and were members of the East Division of the Sun Belt Conference. They finished the season 27–7, 14–2 in Sun Belt play to be Sun Belt East Division champions and overall regular season conference champions. They lost in the quarterfinals of the Sun Belt Basketball tournament to Arkansas State. As regular season conference champions, they received an automatic bid to the 2012 National Invitation Tournament, where they defeated Marshall in the first round and Tennessee in the second round before falling in the quarterfinals to Minnesota.

== Roster ==
Number	Name	Position	Height	Weight	Year	Hometown
0	Zane Gibson	Guard	6–2	180	Sophomore	Chattanooga, Tennessee
1	LaRon Dendy	Forward	6–9	230	Senior	Greenville, South Carolina
3	James Gallman	Guard	5–11	180	Junior	Knoxville, Tennessee
11	Julian Edmonson	Guard	6–2	190	Freshman	Fort Worth, Texas
12	Shawn Jones	Forward	6–8	227	Sophomore	Hialeah, Florida
13	Bruce Massey	Guard	6–3	195	Junior	Germantown, Maryland
14	Marcos Knight	Guard	6–2	210	Junior	Rentz, Georgia
15	Raymond Cintron	Guard	6–0	195	Junior	San Juan, Puerto Rico
20	Jimmy Oden	Guard	6–3	175	Senior	Murfreesboro, Tennessee
21	Torin Walker	Center	6–11	248	Sophomore	Columbus, Georgia
22	Jason Jones	Guard/forward	6–6	195	Junior	Memphis, Tennessee
24	Kerry Hammonds	Guard/forward	6–5	200	Sophomore	Murfreesboro, Tennessee
30	JT Sulton	Forward	6–8	230	Junior	Yazoo City, Mississippi
42	Jacquez Rozier	Forward	6–7	210	Freshman	Waynesboro, Georgia

== Schedule ==
Date time, TV	Rank^{#}	Opponent^{#}	Result	Record	Site (attendance) city, state
Exhibition
11/07/2011*; 7:00 pm		North Alabama	W 108–58		Murphy Center (2,300); Murfreesboro, TN
Regular season
11/11/2011*; 7:00 pm		Austin Peay	W 80–71	1–0	Murphy Center (4,011); Murfreesboro, TN
11/13/2011*; 5:00 pm		at Loyola Marymount	W 58–51	2–0	Gersten Pavilion (1,853); Los Angeles, CA
11/15/2011*; 10:00 pm, Prime Ticket		at UCLA; Maui Invitational Opening Game	W 86–66	3–0	Los Angeles Memorial Sports Arena (2,308); Los Angeles, CA
11/19/2011*; 5:15 pm		UNC Greensboro; Maui Invitational Regional	W 82–60	4–0	Murphy Center (5,411); Murfreesboro, TN
11/20/2011*; 3:30 pm		Belmont; Maui Invitational Regional	L 84–87 ^{2OT}	4–1	Murphy Center (4,762); Murfreesboro, TN
11/22/2011*; 7:00 pm		Cumberland	W 88–48	5–1	Murphy Center (2,911); Murfreesboro, TN
11/26/2011*; 7:00 pm		at Austin Peay	W 90–70	6–1	Dunn Center (2,632); Clarksville, TN
12/01/2011*; 7:00 pm		at Tennessee State	W 77–62	7–1	Gentry Center (6,131); Nashville, TN
12/04/2011*; 1:00 pm		Akron	W 77–53	8–1	Murphy Center (3,298); Murfreesboro, TN
12/07/2011*; 7:00 pm		at UAB	L 56–66	8–2	Bartow Arena (4,576); Birmingham, AL
12/10/2011*; 5:00 pm		UT Martin	W 78–62	9–2	Murphy Center (3,528); Murfreesboro, TN
12/13/2011*; 7:00 pm, ESPN3		Belmont	W 65–62	10–2	Murphy Center (6,095); Murfreesboro, TN
12/21/2011*; 8:00 pm, CSS		vs. Ole Miss	W 68–56	11–2	Lander's Center (2,342); Southaven, MS
12/29/2011; 7:00 pm		at FIU	W 71–66	12–2 (1–0)	Murphy Center (4,922); Murfreesboro, TN
12/31/2011; 2:30 pm, Sun Belt Network		South Alabama	W 68–52	13–2 (2–0)	Murphy Center (3,528); Murfreesboro, TN
01/05/2012; 7:30 pm		at Troy	W 63–53	14–2 (3–0)	Trojan Arena (1,752); Troy, AL
01/07/2012; 5:30 pm		Louisiana–Lafayette	W 65–53	15–2 (4–0)	Murphy Center (4,028); Murfreesboro, TN
01/12/2012; 6:30 pm		at FIU	W 70–59	16–2 (5–0)	U.S. Century Bank Arena (1,116); Miami, FL
01/14/2012; 6:00 pm		at Florida Atlantic	W 67–54	17–2 (6–0)	FAU Arena (2,590); Boca Raton, FL
01/19/2012; 7:00 pm, ESPN3		Arkansas State	W 59–46	18–2 (7–0)	Murphy Center (5,822); Murfreesboro, TN
01/21/2012; 7:00 pm		at South Alabama	W 68–47	19–2 (8–0)	Mitchell Center (2,889); Mobile, AL
01/26/2012; 7:00 pm		Troy	W 71–58	20–2 (9–0)	Murphy Center (5,712); Murfreesboro, TN
01/28/2012*; 1:00 pm		at Vanderbilt	L 77–84	20–3	Memorial Gymnasium (14,316); Nashville, TN
02/02/2012; 7:00 pm		at North Texas	W 68–66	21–3 (10–0)	UNT Coliseum (5,510); Denton, TX
02/04/2012; 3:00 pm, ESPN2		at Denver	L 60–75	21–4 (10–1)	Magness Arena (6,066); Denver, CO
02/09/2012; 7:00 pm, FCS		WKU	W 72–64	22–4 (11–1)	Murphy Center (7,080); Murfreesboro, TN
02/11/2012; 5:00 pm, ESPN2		Arkansas–Little Rock	W 68–60	23–4 (12–1)	Murphy Center (6,806); Murfreesboro, TN
02/18/2012; 5:30 pm, ESPN3		Florida Atlantic	W 72–59	24–4 (13–1)	Murphy Center (7,605); Murfreesboro, TN
02/23/2012; 7:30 pm		at Louisiana–Monroe	W 94–61	25–4 (14–1)	Fant–Ewing Coliseum (1,498); Monroe, LA
02/25/2012; 5:00 pm, Sun Belt Network		at WKU	L 67–73	25–5 (14–2)	E. A. Diddle Arena (7,326); Bowling Green, KY
2012 Sun Belt Conference men's basketball tournament
03/04/2012; 6:00 pm, Sun Belt Network		vs. Arkansas State; Quarterfinals	L 61–64	25–6	Summit Arena (4,365); Hot Springs, AR
2012 NIT
03/13/2012*; 8:15 pm, ESPN3		Marshall; First round	W 86–78	26–6	Murphy Center (4,556); Murfreesboro, TN
03/19/2012*; 6:00 pm, ESPN		at Tennessee; Second Round	W 71–64	27–6	Thompson-Boling Arena (12,038); Knoxville, TN
03/21/2012*; 6:00 pm, ESPN2		Minnesota; Quarterfinals	L 72–78	27–7	Murphy Center (10,521); Murfreesboro, TN
*Non-conference game. ^{#}Rankings from AP Poll. (#) Tournament seedings in parentheses. All times are in Central Time.
