= 2011–12 Denver Pioneers men's basketball team =

American college basketball season

2011–12 Denver Pioneers men's basketball
- Conference: Sun Belt Conference
- West Division
- Record: 22–9 (11–5 Sun Belt)
- Head coach: Joe Scott (5th season)
- Assistant coaches: Mike McKee; Jon Jordan; A.J. Kuhle
- Home arena: Magness Arena

2011–12 Sun Belt Conference men's basketball standings
| | Conf. | | | | Overall |
| Team | W | | L | PCT | W | | L | PCT |
|---|---|---|---|---|---|---|---|---|
East
| Middle Tennessee | 14 | – | 2 | .875 | 27 | – | 7 | .794 |
| South Alabama | 8 | – | 8 | .500 | 17 | – | 12 | .586 |
| Florida Atlantic | 7 | – | 9 | .438 | 11 | – | 19 | .367 |
| Western Kentucky† | 7 | – | 9 | .438 | 16 | – | 19 | .457 |
| Troy | 5 | – | 11 | .313 | 10 | – | 18 | .357 |
| Florida International | 5 | – | 11 | .313 | 8 | – | 21 | .276 |
West
| Arkansas–Little Rock | 12 | – | 4 | .750 | 15 | – | 16 | .484 |
| Denver | 11 | – | 5 | .688 | 22 | – | 9 | .710 |
| Louisiana–Lafayette | 10 | – | 6 | .625 | 16 | – | 16 | .500 |
| North Texas | 9 | – | 7 | .563 | 18 | – | 14 | .563 |
| Arkansas State | 6 | – | 10 | .375 | 14 | – | 20 | .412 |
| *Louisiana–Monroe | 2 | – | 14 | .125 | 3 | – | 26 | .103 |
† 2012 Sun Belt Tournament winner As of March 21, 2012; Rankings from AP Poll; *Ineligible for conference tournament

The 2011–12 Denver Pioneers men's basketball team represented the University of Denver during the 2011–12 NCAA Division I men's basketball season. The Pioneers, led by fifth year head coach Joe Scott, played their home games at Magness Arena and were members of the West Division of the Sun Belt Conference. They finished the season 22–9, 11–5 in Sun Belt play to finish in second place in the West Division. They lost in the semifinals of the Sun Belt Basketball tournament to WKU. Despite having 22 wins, the Pioneers did not accept an invitation to a post season tournament.

This was Denver's final year as a member of the Sun Belt as they will join the Western Athletic Conference on July 1, 2012.

== Roster ==
| Number | Name | Position | Height | Weight | Year | Hometown |
|---|---|---|---|---|---|---|
| 5 | Brian Stafford | Guard | 6–4 | 188 | Senior | Walnut Creek, California |
| 10 | Rob Lewis | Forward | 6–7 | 225 | Senior | Colorado Springs, Colorado |
| 12 | Justin Coughlin | Forward | 6–9 | 203 | Senior | Yuma, Colorado |
| 13 | Tyler Thalken | Guard | 6–4 | 195 | Junior | Tulsa, Oklahoma |
| 14 | Blake Foeman | Forward | 6–7 | 205 | Sophomore | Weston, Florida |
| 15 | Travis Hallam | Guard | 6–5 | 220 | Senior | Mesquite, Texas |
| 20 | Royce O'Neale | Forward | 6–5 | 202 | Freshman | Killeen, Texas |
| 21 | Alex Pickert | Guard | 5–9 | 160 | Senior | Carmel, California |
| 22 | Charles Webb | Guard | 5–5 | 155 | Sophomore | Erie, Colorado |
| 23 | Brett Olson | Guard | 6–5 | 170 | Freshman | Highlands Ranch, Colorado |
| 25 | Jake Logan | Center | 6–8 | 215 | Freshman | Norwalk, Iowa |
| 30 | Cam Griffin | Guard | 6–5 | 210 | Junior | San Antonio, Texas |
| 32 | Chase Hallam | Guard | 6–5 | 210 | Junior | Mesquite, Texas |
| 34 | Chris Udofia | Forward | 6–6 | 194 | Sophomore | Irving, Texas |
| 35 | Marcus Byrd | Forward | 6–7 | 187 | Freshman | Highlands Ranch, Colorado |

== Schedule ==
| Date time, TV | Rank^{#} | Opponent^{#} | Result | Record | Site (attendance) city, state |
Regular season
| 11/11/2011*; 7:30 pm, RTRM | | Portland State | W 69–61 | 1–0 | Magness Arena (6,420); Denver, CO |
| 11/14/2011*; 6:00 pm | | at Texas A&M–Corpus Christi | W 65–58 | 2–0 | American Bank Center (1,226); Corpus Christi, TX |
| 11/17/2011*; 7:00 pm | | Southern Miss | W 59–52 | 3–0 | Magness Arena (5,222); Denver, CO |
| 11/23/2011*; 7:00 pm, RTRM | | Saint Mary's | W 70–58 | 4–0 | Magness Arena (5,408); Denver, CO |
| 11/26/2011*; 3:00 pm | | at No. 20 California | L 59–80 | 4–1 | Haas Pavilion (7,324); Berkeley, CA |
| 11/30/2011*; 7:00 pm, ESPN3 | | at Utah State | W 67–54 | 5–1 | Smith Spectrum (10,056); Logan, UT |
| 12/03/2011*; 4:00 pm | | Texas Southern | W 62–46 | 6–1 | Magness Arena (2,790); Denver, CO |
| 12/07/2011*; 7:00 pm, RTRM | | Iona | L 78–80 ^{OT} | 6–2 | Magness Arena (5,886); Denver, CO |
| 12/14/2011*; 7:00 pm, Altitude | | at Northern Colorado | W 71–65 | 7–2 | Butler–Hancock Sports Pavilion (1,476); Greeley, CO |
| 12/17/2011*; 4:30 pm, RTRM | | Boise State | W 79–62 | 8–2 | Magness Arena (2,335); Denver, CO |
| 12/19/2011*; 6:00 pm, RTRM | | Wyoming | W 57–46 | 9–2 | Magness Arena (7,168); Denver, CO |
| 12/22/2011*; 7:00 pm | | The Citadel | W 70–58 | 10–2 | Magness Arena (6,355); Denver, CO |
| 12/29/2011; 7:00 pm | | Troy | W 79–62 | 11–2 (1–0) | Magness Arena (6,102); Denver, CO |
| 12/31/2011; 4:00 pm | | Arkansas–Little Rock | L 59–66 | 11–3 (1–1) | Magness Arena (4,651); Denver, CO |
| 01/05/2012; 6:00 pm | | at Arkansas State | W 53–50 | 12–3 (2–1) | Convocation Center (2,345); Jonesboro, AR |
| 01/07/2012; 2:30 pm, Sun Belt Network | | at South Alabama | W 67–50 | 13–3 (3–1) | Mitchell Center (1,902); Mobile, AL |
| 01/11/2012*; 5:30 pm, The Mtn. | | at Colorado State | L 75–79 | 13–4 | Moby Arena (4,028); Fort Collins, CO |
| 01/15/2012; 1:00 pm | | WKU | W 78–65 | 14–4 (4–1) | Magness Arena (6,232); Denver, CO |
| 01/19/2012; 6:30 pm | | at Louisiana–Monroe | W 63–48 | 15–4 (5–1) | Fant–Ewing Coliseum (1,640); Monroe, LA |
| 01/21/2012; 6:00 pm | | at North Texas | L 74–75 ^{OT} | 15–5 (5–2) | UNT Coliseum (4,859); Denton, TX |
| 01/26/2012; 6:30 pm, RTRM | | Arkansas State | W 66–52 | 16–5 (6–2) | Magness Arena (7,075); Denver, CO |
| 01/28/2012; 6:00 pm | | at Arkansas–Little Rock | L 57–64 | 16–6 (6–3) | Jack Stephens Center (4,088); Little Rock, AR |
| 02/02/2012; 6:00 pm | | at Louisiana–Lafayette | L 71–72 ^{OT} | 16–7 (6–4) | Cajundome (3,611); Lafayette, LA |
| 02/04/2012; 2:00 pm, ESPN2 | | Middle Tennessee | W 75–60 | 17–7 (7–4) | Magness Arena (6,066); Denver, CO |
| 02/09/2012; 5:00 pm | | at Florida Atlantic | L 71–72 | 17–8 (7–5) | FAU Arena (1,823); Boca, Raton |
| 02/11/2012; 5:30 pm | | at Florida International | W 77–63 | 18–8 (8–5) | U.S. Century Bank Arena (1,105); Miami, FL |
| 02/16/2012; 5:00 pm, RTRM | | Louisiana–Lafayette | W 77–52 | 19–8 (9–5) | Magness Arena (5,870); Denver, CO |
| 02/18/2012; 4:00 pm | | Louisiana–Monroe | W 76–57 | 20–8 (10–5) | Magness Arena (5,327); Denver, CO |
| 02/26/2012; 1:00 pm | | North Texas | W 64–52 | 21–8 (11–5) | Magness Arena (4,453); Denver, CO |
2012 Sun Belt Conference men's basketball tournament
| 03/04/2012; 8:45 pm | | vs. South Alabama; Quarterfinals | W 61–50 | 22–8 | Convention Center Court (4,365); Hot Springs, AR |
| 03/05/2012; 8:30 pm, Sun Belt Network | | vs. WKU; Semifinals | L 63–67 | 22–9 | Summit Arena (3,708); Hot Springs, AR |
*Non-conference game. ^{#}Rankings from AP Poll. (#) Tournament seedings in parentheses. All times are in Mountain Time.
