= Ray Harper (basketball) =

American college basketball coach (born 1961)

Current position
- Title: Head coach
- Team: Jacksonville State
- Conference: C-USA
- Record: 184–142 (.564)

Biographical details
- Born: October 11, 1961 (age 65); Bremen, Kentucky, U.S.

Playing career
- 1980–1982: Texas
- 1983–1985: Kentucky Wesleyan

Coaching career (HC unless noted)
- 1985–1989: Kentucky Wesleyan (assistant)
- 1989–1996: Kentucky Wesleyan (assoc. HC)
- 1996–2005: Kentucky Wesleyan
- 2005–2008: Oklahoma City
- 2009–2012: Western Kentucky (assistant)
- 2012–2016: Western Kentucky
- 2016–present: Jacksonville State

Head coaching record
- Overall: 520–252 (.674) (NCAA); 95–17 (.848) (NAIA)
- Tournaments: 1–4 (NCAA Division I); 27–5* (NCAA Division II); 14–1 (NAIA); 2–1 (CBI); 1–1 (NIT)

Accomplishments and honors

Championships
- 2 NCAA Division II tournament (1999, 2001); 2 NAIA Men's Division I Tournament (2007, 2008); 2 Sun Belt tournament (2012, 2013); OVC tournament (2017); ASUN West Division (2022); ASUN regular season (2022)

Awards
- 7× Division II National Coach of the Year; ASUN Coach of the Year (2022); C-USA Coach of the Year (2025)

Lilburn Ray Harper Jr. (born October 11, 1961) is an American college basketball coach, currently head coach for Jacksonville State University. Previously, he was head coach at Oklahoma City University, Kentucky Wesleyan College, and Western Kentucky University. At Kentucky Wesleyan Harper compiled a 242–45 win–loss record.

He has been named the Division II National Coach of the Year seven times and won two national titles at Kentucky Wesleyan in 1999 and 2001.

Harper was named interim head coach at Western Kentucky on January 6, 2012, after Ken McDonald was fired. He was named permanent head coach on February 19, 2012, by then-athletic director Ross Bjork. He resigned from the position on March 17, 2016, following the permanent suspension of three of his players. Harper was subsequently hired at Jacksonville State on April 6, 2016, where he took the 2016–17 team to the school's first NCAA appearance.

Born in Greenville, Kentucky and a native of Bremen, Kentucky, Harper played collegiately at the University of Texas as a freshman and at Kentucky Wesleyan, during his sophomore-senior seasons, where he was named third team NABC All-American as a senior in 1985.

He is married to Shannon Harper, a WKU alumna.

== Head coaching record ==
Record table
Season	Team	Overall	Conference	Standing	Postseason
Kentucky Wesleyan Panthers (Great Lakes Valley Conference) (1996–2005)
1996–97	Kentucky Wesleyan	21–8	14–6	5th	
1997–98	Kentucky Wesleyan	30–3	17–2	1st	NCAA Division II runner-up
1998–99	Kentucky Wesleyan	35–1	20–1	1st	NCAA Division II champion
1999–00	Kentucky Wesleyan	31–3	18–2	1st	NCAA Division II runner-up
2000–01	Kentucky Wesleyan	31–3	17–3	2nd	NCAA Division II champion
2001–02	Kentucky Wesleyan	31–3	19–1	1st	NCAA Division II runner-up
2002–03	Kentucky Wesleyan	31–4*	18–2*	1st*	NCAA Division II runner-up*
2003–04	Kentucky Wesleyan	22–8*	14–6*	3rd*	NCAA Division II first round*
2004–05	Kentucky Wesleyan	15–13	9–11	6th	
Kentucky Wesleyan:		247–46* (.843)	146–34* (.811)		
Oklahoma City Stars (Sooner Athletic Conference) (2005–2008)
2005–06	Oklahoma City	29–8	16–2	1st	NAIA Division I runner-up
2006–07	Oklahoma City	35–2	17–1	1st	NAIA Division I champions
2007–08	Oklahoma City	31–7	18–4	1st	NAIA Division I champions
Oklahoma City NAIA:		95–17 (.848)	51–7 (.879)		
Western Kentucky Hilltoppers (Sun Belt Conference) (2012–2014)
2011–12	Western Kentucky	11–8	6–7	3rd (East)	NCAA Division I Round of 64
2012–13	Western Kentucky	20–16	10–10	4th (East)	NCAA Division I Round of 64
2013–14	Western Kentucky	21–12	12–6	2nd	
Western Kentucky Hilltoppers (Conference USA) (2014–2016)
2014–15	Western Kentucky	20–12	12–6	4th	
2015–16	Western Kentucky	18–16	8–10	8th	
Western Kentucky:		89–64 (.582)	48–39 (.552)		
Jacksonville State Gamecocks (Ohio Valley Conference) (2016–2021)
2016–17	Jacksonville State	20–15	9–7	4th	NCAA Division I Round of 64
2017–18	Jacksonville State	23–13	11–7	4th	CBI semifinals
2018–19	Jacksonville State	24–9	15–3	2nd	
2019–20	Jacksonville State	13–19	8–10	7th	
2020–21	Jacksonville State	18–9	13–6	4th	
Jacksonville State Gamecocks (ASUN Conference) (2021–2023)
2021–22	Jacksonville State	21–11	13–3	1st	NCAA Division I Round of 64
2022–23	Jacksonville State	13–18	6–12	T–11th	
Jacksonville State Gamecocks (Conference USA) (2023–present)
2023–24	Jacksonville State	14–18	6–10	8th	
2024–25	Jacksonville State	23–13	12–6	2nd	NIT Second Round
2025–26	Jacksonville State	15–17	10–10	T–6th	
2026–27	Jacksonville State	0–0	0–0		
Jacksonville State:		184–142 (.564)	103–74 (.582)		
Total:		520–252 (.674)			
National champion Postseason invitational champion Conference regular season champion Conference regular season and conference tournament champion Division regular season champion Division regular season and conference tournament champion Conference tournament champion

* 20 wins and 5 losses were vacated from the 2003–04 season and for the 2002–03 season; the school had to vacate the NCAA Division II runner-up and conference regular season championship.
