= Ken McDonald (basketball) =

American professional basketball coach (born 1970)

Tennessee Volunteers
- Position: Director of student-athlete development
- League: Southeastern Conference

Personal information
- Born: March 4, 1970 (age 56) Providence, Rhode Island, U.S.

Career information
- College: CC of Rhode Island (1989–1990); Providence (1991–1992)
- Coaching career: 1992–present

Career history

Coaching
- 1992–1993: St. Paul Revelles
- 1994–1998: Clemson (asst.)
- 1998–2003: Western Kentucky (asst.)
- 2003–2004: Georgia (asst.)
- 2004–2008: Texas (asst.)
- 2008–2012: Western Kentucky
- 2012–2013: Austin Toros (asst.)
- 2013–2017: Austin Toros/Spurs
- 2018–2019: Tulsa (asst.)

Career highlights
- Sun Belt tournament champion (2009); Sun Belt regular season champion (2009)

Kenneth Michael McDonald (born March 4, 1970) is an American professional basketball coach, currently working as the director of student-athlete development at the University of Tennessee. He previously served as a head coach with the Austin Toros of the NBA Development League and at Western Kentucky University.

McDonald spent from 2004 to 2008 at Texas under Rick Barnes. He previously worked as an assistant at Western Kentucky under Dennis Felton, from 1998 to 2003, helping the Hilltoppers reach the NCAA tournament during his final three seasons with the program. McDonald has one daughter, Ella, born January 24th, 2008.

On January 6, 2012, Western Kentucky University released McDonald from his contract, citing lackluster attendance and a 5–11 start to the 2011–12 season. The firing came after a controversial game the previous night, which allowed Louisiana–Lafayette a game-winning shot with six players on the court during overtime. The error was discovered immediately after the game. Coach McDonald and athletic director Ross Bjork contested the results at the scorer's table. However, officials declined to review the incident due to NCAA rules. He was replaced by assistant coach Ray Harper in interim, who was eventually named head coach moving forward.

In September 2013, he was promoted from assistant to head coach of the Austin Toros. On July 27, 2015, he signed a contract extension with the now Austin Spurs.

On April 12, 2018, McDonald was hired as an assistant coach for the Tulsa Golden Hurricane men's basketball team, working under head coach Frank Haith.

== Head coaching record ==
=== College ===
Record table
Season	Team	Overall	Conference	Standing	Postseason
Western Kentucky Hilltoppers (Sun Belt Conference) (2008–2012)
2008–09	Western Kentucky	25–8	15–3	1st (East)	NCAA Division I Round of 32
2009–10	Western Kentucky	21–13	12–6	3rd (East)	
2010–11	Western Kentucky	16–16	8–8	3rd (East)	
2011–12	Western Kentucky	5–11^{†}	1–2	–	
Western Kentucky:		67–48	36–19		
Total:		67–48			
National champion Postseason invitational champion Conference regular season champion Conference regular season and conference tournament champion Division regular season champion Division regular season and conference tournament champion Conference tournament champion

† Fired on January 6, 2012; Ray Harper finished the season as interim head coach with an 11–5 record, making Western Kentucky's cumulative record in the 2011–12 season 16–19 (7–9, 3rd in Sun Belt).

=== NBA Development League ===
Legend
Regular season	G	Games coached	W	Games won	L	Games lost	W–L %	Win–loss %
Playoffs	PG	Playoff games	PW	Playoff wins	PL	Playoff losses	PW–L %	Playoff win–loss %

Team	Year	G	W	L	W–L%	Finish	PG	PW	PL	PW–L%	Result
AUS	2013–14	50	19	31	.380	6th in Central	–	–	–	–	Missed Playoffs
AUS	2014–15	50	32	18	.640	1st in Southwest	6	4	2	.667	Lost in D-League Semifinals
AUS	2015–16	50	30	20	.600	1st in Southwest	6	4	2	.667	Lost in D-League Semifinals
AUS	2016–17	50	25	25	.380	4th in Southwest	–	–	–	–	Missed Playoffs
Career		200	106	94	.540		12	8	4	.667	
