= Don Friday =

American basketball coach

Personal information
- Born: April 17, 1968 (age 58) United States

Career information
- College: Lebanon Valley College
- Position: Coach
- Coaching career: 1990–present

Career history

Coaching
- 1990–1994: Lebanon Valley College (assistant)
- 1994–2003: Bucknell University (assistant)
- 2003–2008: Lycoming College (head coach)
- 2008–2012: Saint Francis University (head coach)
- (brief stop): Susquehanna University (assistant)
- present: Penn State Harrisburg (head coach)

Career highlights
- 1994 NCAA Division III National Champion (as assistant), 2x MAC Coach of the Year

Don Friday (born April 17, 1968) is an American college basketball coach, and the former men's basketball head coach at Saint Francis University, having been named to the post in April 2008. He previously served as head coach at Lycoming College (2003–2008), assistant coach at Bucknell University (1994–2003), and assistant coach at Lebanon Valley College (1990–1994). At Lebanon Valley and Bucknell, he coached under Pat Flannery, and in 1994 he assisted Flannery as Lebanon Valley won the 1994 Division III National Championship. He was the MAC coach of the year twice as the men's head coach at Lycoming University. Friday has a true knowledge of the game. In 2012, he was fired at Saint Francis after several years of poor results and frequent transfers away from the school. Friday was hired by head coach Frank Marcinek at Susquehanna University; after that brief stop Friday is now the head coach at Penn State Harrisburg. Friday captured a win on number-15-ranked Christopher Newport, one of the biggest upsets in program history. Friday earned a bachelor's degree in business from Lebanon Valley College.
