= O'Karo Akamune =

American-born Nigerian basketball player

Personal information
- Born: February 25, 1992 (age 34) Miami, Florida, U.S.
- Listed height: 6 ft 7 in (2.01 m)
- Listed weight: 215 lb (98 kg)

Career information
- High school: Everglades (Miami, Florida)
- College: Eastern Oklahoma State (2010–2011); Western Kentucky (2011–2014)
- NBA draft: 2014: undrafted
- Playing career: 2014–2018
- Position: Power forward

Career history
- 2014–2018: Hørsholm 79ers
Medals
Men's basketball
Representing Nigeria
AfroBasket
| Silver medal – second place | 2017 Tunisia/Senegal |

O'Karo Akamune (born February 25, 1992) is an American-born Nigerian former basketball player for Hørsholm 79ers and the Nigerian national team.

He participated at the AfroBasket 2017.
