= 2012 Sun Belt Conference men's basketball tournament =

- Classification: Division I
- Season: 2011–12
- Teams: 11
- Site: Summit Arena; Convention Center Court; Hot Springs, Arkansas
- Champions: Western Kentucky (8th title)
- Winning coach: Ray Harper (1st title)
- MVP: George Fant (Western Kentucky)
- Attendance: 4,126
- Television: ESPN Regional Television, ESPN2

2011–12 Sun Belt Conference men's basketball standings
	Conf.				Overall
Team	W		L	PCT	W		L	PCT
East
Middle Tennessee	14	–	2	.875	27	–	7	.794
South Alabama	8	–	8	.500	17	–	12	.586
Florida Atlantic	7	–	9	.438	11	–	19	.367
Western Kentucky†	7	–	9	.438	16	–	19	.457
Troy	5	–	11	.313	10	–	18	.357
Florida International	5	–	11	.313	8	–	21	.276
West
Arkansas–Little Rock	12	–	4	.750	15	–	16	.484
Denver	11	–	5	.688	22	–	9	.710
Louisiana–Lafayette	10	–	6	.625	16	–	16	.500
North Texas	9	–	7	.563	18	–	14	.563
Arkansas State	6	–	10	.375	14	–	20	.412
*Louisiana–Monroe	2	–	14	.125	3	–	26	.103
† 2012 Sun Belt Tournament winner As of March 21, 2012; Rankings from AP Poll; *Ineligible for conference tournament

The 2012 Sun Belt Conference men's basketball tournament was held in Hot Springs, Arkansas from March 3 to March 6 at the Summit Arena and the Convention Center Court. Eleven Sun Belt teams participated in the tournament with seedings based on their conference record. Louisiana-Monroe did not compete in the 2012 Sun Belt Tournament due to failing to meet the NCAA's Academic Progress Rate requirements. This was Denver's final year in the Sun Belt due to the move to the Western Athletic Conference for the 2012–13 basketball season. The tournament winner received an automatic bid into the 2012 NCAA tournament.

== Format ==
All teams except Louisiana-Monroe qualified for the 2012 Sun Belt Men's Basketball Tournament. The championship game was broadcast on ESPN2.

== Bracket ==
First round Saturday, March 3
8	Florida Atlantic	55
9	Arkansas State	70
7	Western Kentucky	67
10	Florida International	63
6	South Alabama	87
11	Troy	81

Quarterfinals; Sunday, March 4
1	Middle Tennessee	61
9	Arkansas State	64
4	Louisiana Lafayette	62
5	North Texas	65
2	Arkansas–Little Rock	63
7	Western Kentucky	68
3	Denver	61
6	South Alabama	50

Semifinals; Monday, March 5
9	Arkansas State	72
5	North Texas	76
7	Western Kentucky	67
3	Denver	63

Championship Game; Tuesday, March 6
5	North Texas	70
7	Western Kentucky	74
