= Memphis Tigers men's basketball statistical leaders =

The Memphis Tigers men's basketball statistical leaders are individual statistical leaders of the Memphis Tigers men's basketball program in various categories, including points, rebounds, assists, steals, and blocks. Within those areas, the lists identify single-game, single-season, and career leaders. The Tigers represent the University of Memphis in the NCAA's American Athletic Conference.

Memphis began competing in intercollegiate basketball in 1920. However, the school's record book does not generally list records from before the 1950s, as records from before this period are often incomplete and inconsistent. Since scoring was much lower in this era, and teams played much fewer games during a typical season, it is likely that few or no players from this era would appear on these lists anyway.

The NCAA did not officially record assists as a stat until the 1983–84 season, and blocks and steals until the 1985–86 season, but Memphis' record books includes players in these stats before these seasons. These lists are updated through the end of the 2020–21 season.

== Scoring ==
Career
Rk	Player	Points	Seasons
1	Keith Lee	2,408	1981–82 1982–83 1983–84 1984–85
2	Elliot Perry	2,209	1987–88 1988–89 1989–90 1990–91
3	Rodney Carney	1,893	2002–03 2003–04 2004–05 2005–06
4	Larry Finch	1,869	1970–71 1971–72 1972–73
5	Forest Arnold	1,854	1952–53 1953–54 1954–55 1955–56
6	Cedric Henderson	1,697	1993–94 1994–95 1995–96 1996–97
7	Joe Jackson	1,687	2010–11 2011–12 2012–13 2013–14
8	Dexter Reed	1,678	1973–74 1974–75 1975–76 1976–77
9	Bill Cook	1,629	1972–73 1973–74 1974–75 1975–76
10	Jeremiah Martin	1,625	2015–16 2016–17 2017–18 2018–19

Season
Rk	Player	Points	Season
1	Dajuan Wagner	762	2001–02
2	PJ Haggerty	759	2024–25
3	Kendric Davis	744	2022–23
4	Anfernee Hardaway	729	1992–93
5	Chris Douglas-Roberts	724	2007–08
6	Larry Finch	721	1972–73
7	Jeremiah Martin	708	2018–19
8	David Jones	698	2023–24
9	Keith Lee	688	1984–85
10	Larry Finch	669	1971–72

Single game
Rk	Player	Points	Season	Opponent
1	Larry Finch	48	1972–73	St. Joseph's
2	Forest Arnold	46	1955–56	Hardin-Simmons
3	Dick Kinder	44	1953–54	Marshall
4	Jeremiah Martin	43	2018–19	Tulane
5	Elliot Perry	42	1990–91	East Tennessee
	Leslie Steele	42	1941–42	Southwestern
	Kendric Davis	42	2022–23	UCF
	PJ Haggerty	42	2024–25	Wichita State
9	Marcus Moody	41	1997–98	Oklahoma
	Jeremiah Martin	41	2018–19	USF

== Rebounds ==
Career
Rk	Player	Rebounds	Seasons
1	Keith Lee	1,336	1981–82 1982–83 1983–84 1984–85
2	Joey Dorsey	1,209	2004–05 2005–06 2006–07 2007–08
3	Forest Arnold	1,109	1952–53 1953–54 1954–55 1955–56
4	Kelly Wise	1,075	1998–99 1999–00 2000–01 2001–02
5	Ronnie Robinson	1,066	1970–71 1971–72 1972–73
6	Robert Dozier	961	2005–06 2006–07 2007–08 2008–09
7	David Vaughn	903	1991–92 1992–93 1993–94 1994–95
8	Don Holcomb	870	1969–70 1970–71 1971–72
9	Shaq Goodwin	852	2012–13 2013–14 2014–15 2015–16
10	James Bradley	716	1976–77 1977–78 1978–79

Season
Rk	Player	Rebounds	Season
1	Larry Kenon	501	1972–73
2	Ronnie Robinson	372	1971–72
	Win Wilfong	372	1956–57
4	Ronnie Robinson	369	1970–71
5	Don Holcomb	366	1971–72
6	Kelly Wise	363	2000–01
7	Joey Dorsey	362	2007–08
8	Keith Lee	357	1983–84
9	Forest Arnold	351	1955–56
10	Lorenzen Wright	345	1994–95

Single game
Rk	Player	Rebounds	Season	Opponent
1	Ronnie Robinson	28	1970–71	Tulsa
2	Marion Hillard	25	1974–75	Florida State
3	John Washington	24	1973–74	Samford
	Larry Kenon	24	1972–73	Tulsa
	Larry Kenon	24	1972–73	St. Joseph's
	Ronnie Robinson	24	1971–72	South Ala.
	Ronnie Robinson	24	1970–71	Wichita State
	Ronnie Robinson	24	1970–71	North Texas

== Assists ==
Career
Rk	Player	Assists	Seasons
1	Andre Turner	763	1982–83 1983–84 1984–85 1985–86
2	Chris Garner	639	1993–94 1994–95 1995–96 1996–97
3	Alvin Wright	615	1974–75 1975–76 1976–77 1977–78
4	Joe Jackson	567	2010–11 2011–12 2012–13 2013–14
5	Elliot Perry	546	1987–88 1988–89 1989–90 1990–91
6	Antonio Anderson	538	2005–06 2006–07 2007–08 2008–09
7	Otis Jackson	498	1978–79 1979–80 1980–81 1981–82
8	Alex Lomax	489	2018–19 2019–20 2020–21 2021–22 2022–23
9	Antonio Burks	487	2001–02 2002–03 2003–04
10	Chris Crawford	467	2010–11 2011–12 2012–13 2013–14

Season
Rk	Player	Assists	Season
1	Andre Turner	262	1985–86
2	Andre Turner	224	1984–85
3	Chris Garner	217	1994–95
4	Anfernee Hardaway	204	1992–93
5	John Wilfong	198	1986–87
6	Derrick Rose	189	2007–08
7	Anfernee Hardaway	188	1991–92
8	Kendric Davis	185	2022–23
9	Antonio Burks	182	2001–02
10	Alvin Wright	178	1976–77

Single game
Rk	Player	Assists	Season	Opponent
1	Andre Turner	15	1985–86	South Carolina
2	Anfernee Hardaway	14	1992–93	Ga. State
	Alvin Wright	14	1976–77	Brandeis

== Steals ==
Career
Rk	Player	Steals	Seasons
1	Chris Garner	321	1993–94 1994–95 1995–96 1996–97
2	Elliot Perry	304	1987–88 1988–89 1989–90 1990–91
3	Andre Turner	272	1982–83 1983–84 1984–85 1985–86
4	Chris Crawford	223	2010–11 2011–12 2012–13 2013–14
5	Jeremiah Martin	222	2015–16 2016–17 2017–18 2018–19
6	Alex Lomax	218	2018–19 2019–20 2020–21 2021–22 2022–23
7	Antonio Anderson	213	2005–06 2006–07 2007–08 2008–09
8	Otis Jackson	206	1978–79 1979–80 1980–81 1981–82
9	Joe Jackson	189	2010–11 2011–12 2012–13 2013–14
10	Antonio Burks	177	2001–02 2002–03 2003–04

Season
Rk	Player	Steals	Season
1	Chris Garner	90	1994–95
2	Andre Turner	87	1985–86
3	Anfernee Hardaway	86	1991–92
4	Elliot Perry	85	1990–91
	Chris Garner	85	1996–97
6	Elliot Perry	82	1989–90
7	Dexter Reed	81	1976–77
8	Jeremiah Martin	79	2018–19
9	Tyreke Evans	77	2008–09
10	Anfernee Hardaway	76	1992–93

Single game
Rk	Player	Steals	Season	Opponent
1	Elliot Perry	9	1990–91	Tennessee
	Elliot Perry	9	1989–90	Tennessee
	Andre Turner	9	1985–86	Virginia Tech
4	Elliot Perry	8	1989–90	Wyoming
	Elliot Perry	8	1989–90	Tennessee State
	Dexter Reed	8	1976–77	Ole Miss

== Blocks ==
Career
Rk	Player	Blocks	Seasons
1	Keith Lee	320	1981–82 1982–83 1983–84 1984–85
2	Joey Dorsey	264	2004–05 2005–06 2006–07 2007–08
3	David Vaughn	235	1991–92 1992–93 1993–94 1994–95
4	William Bedford	234	1983–84 1984–85 1985–86
5	Robert Dozier	228	2005–06 2006–07 2007–08 2008–09
6	Kelly Wise	226	1998–99 1999–00 2000–01 2001–02
7	Shaq Goodwin	197	2012–13 2013–14 2014–15 2015–16
8	Dennis Isbell	178	1976–77 1977–78 1979–80 1980–81
9	John Washington	159	1972–73 1973–74 1975–76 1976–77
	Kelvin Allen	159	1989–90 1990–91 1991–92 1992–93

Season
Rk	Player	Blocks	Season
1	David Vaughn	107	1993–94
2	Keith Lee	102	1981–82
3	Keith Lee	96	1982–83
4	D.J. Stephens	95	2012–13
5	Austin Nichols	93	2014–15
6	William Bedford	91	1984–85
7	William Bedford	86	1985–86
8	Joey Dorsey	81	2006–07
9	Keith Lee	76	1983–84
10	Joey Dorsey	74	2007–08

Single game
Rk	Player	Blocks	Season	Opponent
1	David Vaughn	9	1993–94	Georgia State
	Keith Lee	9	1981–82	Brown
3	Malcolm Dandridge	8	2023–24	Tulane
	Dedric Lawson	8	2016–17	UAB
	Austin Nichols	8	2014–15	Oral Roberts
	D.J. Stephens	8	2012–13	Saint Mary's
	Kelly Wise	8	1999–00	Southern Miss
	Dexter Reed	8	1976–77	Ole Miss
