= 2011–12 Conference USA men's basketball season =

- League: NCAA Division I
- Sport: Basketball
- Teams: 12
- TV partner: Fox Sports/ CBS Sports Network

Regular Season
- 2012 C-USA Champions: Memphis
- Season MVP: Will Barton - Memphis

Tournament
- Champions: Memphis
- Runners-up: Marshall

Basketball seasons
- 10–11 12–13

2011–12 Conference USA men's basketball standings
	Conf.				Overall
Team	W		L	PCT	W		L	PCT
Memphis†	13	–	3	.813	26	–	8	.765
Southern Miss	11	–	5	.688	25	–	9	.735
Tulsa	10	–	6	.625	17	–	14	.548
UCF	10	–	6	.625	22	–	11	.667
UAB	9	–	7	.563	15	–	16	.484
Marshall	9	–	7	.563	21	–	14	.600
Rice	8	–	8	.500	18	–	15	.545
UTEP	7	–	9	.438	15	–	17	.469
Houston	7	–	9	.438	15	–	15	.500
East Carolina	5	–	11	.313	15	–	16	.484
SMU	4	–	12	.250	13	–	19	.406
Tulane	3	–	13	.188	15	–	19	.441
† 2012 CUSA Tournament winner As of March 15, 2012; Rankings from AP Poll

The 2011–12 Conference USA men's basketball season marks the 17th season of Conference USA basketball.

== Preseason ==
On October 10, 2011, Cameron Moore of UAB was named Preseason Player of the Year.

=== Preseason teams ===
Award	Recipients
First Team	Keith Clanton (UCF); Arsalan Kazemi (Rice); Cameron Moore (UAB); Will Barton (Memphis); Kendall Timmons (Tulane); DeAndre Kane (Marshall)
Second Team	Tarik Black (Memphis); Marcus Jordan (UCF); Joe Jackson (Memphis); Robert Nyakundi (SMU); Darrius Morrow (East Carolina); Jordan Clarkson (Tulsa)
