= 2011–12 Houston Cougars men's basketball team =

American college basketball season

2011–12 Houston Cougars men's basketball
- Conference: Conference USA
- Record: 15–15 (7–9 C-USA)
- Head coach: James Dickey (2nd season)
- Associate head coach: Alvin Brooks
- Assistant coaches: Daniyal Robinson; Ulric Maligi (2nd season)
- Home arena: Hofheinz Pavilion

2011–12 Conference USA men's basketball standings
	Conf.				Overall
Team	W		L	PCT	W		L	PCT
Memphis†	13	–	3	.813	26	–	8	.765
Southern Miss	11	–	5	.688	25	–	9	.735
Tulsa	10	–	6	.625	17	–	14	.548
UCF	10	–	6	.625	22	–	11	.667
UAB	9	–	7	.563	15	–	16	.484
Marshall	9	–	7	.563	21	–	14	.600
Rice	8	–	8	.500	18	–	15	.545
UTEP	7	–	9	.438	15	–	17	.469
Houston	7	–	9	.438	15	–	15	.500
East Carolina	5	–	11	.313	15	–	16	.484
SMU	4	–	12	.250	13	–	19	.406
Tulane	3	–	13	.188	15	–	19	.441
† 2012 CUSA Tournament winner As of March 15, 2012; Rankings from AP Poll

The 2011–12 Houston Cougars men's basketball team represented the University of Houston in the college basketball 2011–12 season. It was their 67th year of season play. The head coach for the Cougars was James Dickey, who was serving in his 2nd year in that position. The team played its home games at Hofheinz Pavilion on-campus in Houston and was a member of Conference USA. The Cougars improved from the season prior by ending the season with a 0.500 record at 15–15, but only managed 7–9 in conference play. In a season marked by inconsistent play, the team ended their season with an overtime loss to UTEP in the Conference USA tournament.

== Roster ==
2011–12 Houston Cougars men's basketball team
Players
Coaches

Pos.	#	Name	Height	Weight	Year	Hometown
G	0	Joe Young	6 ft 3 in (1.91 m)	185 lb (84 kg)	RS Fr	Houston, Texas
F	1	Mikhail McLean	6 ft 8 in (2.03 m)	205 lb (93 kg)	So	Houston, Texas
F	2	Alandise Harris	6 ft 6 in (1.98 m)	230 lb (104 kg)	So	Little Rock, Arkansas
G	3	J.J. Thompson	6 ft 0 in (1.83 m)	185 lb (84 kg)	Fr	Irving, Texas
G	4	LeRon Barnes	6 ft 6 in (1.98 m)	195 lb (88 kg)	Fr	Stonewall, Louisiana
G	11	Darian Thibodeaux	6 ft 3 in (1.91 m)	175 lb (79 kg)	Sr	Dallas, Texas
G	12	Jimmie Jones	5 ft 10 in (1.78 m)	160 lb (73 kg)	RS So	Plano, Texas
F	15	Leon Gibson	6 ft 9 in (2.06 m)	245 lb (111 kg)	Jr	Los Angeles, California
G	20	Donald Brooks	6 ft 0 in (1.83 m)	185 lb (84 kg)	So	Houston, Texas
G	21	Jherrod Stiggers	6 ft 5 in (1.96 m)	210 lb (95 kg)	Fr	Terrell, Texas
G	23	Jonathon Simmons	6 ft 6 in (1.98 m)	195 lb (88 kg)	RS Jr	Houston, Texas
F	32	Kirk Van Slyke	6 ft 9 in (2.06 m)	225 lb (102 kg)	Jr	The Woodlands, Texas
F	35	TaShawn Thomas	6 ft 8 in (2.03 m)	215 lb (98 kg)	Fr	Killeen, Texas
F	45	Rakim Stevenson	6 ft 6 in (1.98 m)	220 lb (100 kg)	So	Houston, Texas
F	55	J.J. Richardson	6 ft 8 in (2.03 m)	245 lb (111 kg)	Jr	Missouri City, Texas

Head coach

- James Dickey (Central Arkansas)

Assistant coach(es)

- Alvin Brooks (Lamar)
- Daniyal Robinson (Little Rock)
- Ulric Maligi (Howard)

Legend

- (C) Team captain
- (S) Suspended
- (I) Ineligible
- (W) Walk-on
- Injured
- Current redshirt

Roster
Last update: 2011-12-30

== Schedule ==
Date time, TV	Opponent	Result	Record	Site city, state
Exhibition
Tue, Nov 8*; 7:00PM	Concordia	W 118–70	–	Hofheinz Pavilion; Houston, TX
Regular season
Sat, Nov 12*; 7:00PM	Grambling State	W 88–42	1–0	Hofheinz Pavilion (3,777); Houston, TX
Mon, Nov 14*; 7:00PM	Utah Valley	W 84–71	2–0	Hofheinz Pavilion (3,007); Houston, TX
Fri, Nov 18*; 7:00PM, FSN	at Arkansas; Southwest Showcase	W 87–78	3–0	Verizon Arena (12,691); North Little Rock, AR
Tue, Nov 22*; 7:15PM	Oakland	L 74–76	3–1	Hofheinz Pavilion (3,287); Houston, TX
Sat, Nov 26*; 7:00PM	TCU	L 80–81	3–2	Hofheinz Pavilion (3,357); Houston, TX
Tue, Nov 29*; 7:00PM, CBSSN	LSU	L 58–59	3–3	Hofheinz Pavilion (4,257); Houston, TX
Sat, Dec 3*; 7:00PM	Texas A&M–Corpus Christi	W 87–66	4–3	Hofheinz Pavilion (3,052); Houston, TX
Tue, Dec 6*; 6:00PM	at Texas State	L 78–81	4–4	Strahan Coliseum (3,527); San Marcos, TX
Sat, Dec 17*; 7:00PM, ESPNU	vs. Oklahoma; All-College Basketball Classic	L 74–79	4–5	Chesapeake Energy Arena (5,303); Oklahoma City, OK
Tue, Dec 20*; 7:00PM	UTSA	W 77–75	5–5	Hofheinz Pavilion (3,780); Houston, TX
Wed, Dec 21*; 7:00PM	Rogers State	W 90–80	6–5	Hofheinz Pavilion (3,464); Houston, TX
Wed, Dec 28*; 2:00PM	North Carolina A&T	W 71–67	7–5	Hofheinz Pavilion (4,030); Houston, TX
Fri, Dec 30*; 8:00PM, CSS	Texas State	W 94–71	8–5	Hofheinz Pavilion (3,081); Houston, TX
Wed, Jan 4; 7:00PM	Tulsa	W 70–69 ^{OT}	9–5 (1–0)	Hofheinz Pavilion (3,218); Houston, TX
Sat, Jan 7; 8:00PM	at UTEP	L 50–70	9–6 (1–1)	Don Haskins Center (8,327); El Paso, TX
Wed, Jan 11; 6:00PM	at UCF	L 63–74	9–7 (1–2)	UCF Arena (7,862); Orlando, FL
Sat, Jan 14; 8:00PM, CBSSN	Memphis	L 55–89	9–8 (1–3)	Hofheinz Pavilion (5,146); Houston, TX
Wed, Jan 18; 7:00PM	at SMU	L 54–70	9–9 (1–4)	Moody Coliseum (1,939); University Park, TX
Sat, Jan 21; 7:00PM	East Carolina	W 82–76	10–9 (2–4)	Hofheinz Pavilion (2,954); Houston, TX
Sat, Jan 28; 7:00PM	UTEP	W 81–76 ^{OT}	11–9 (3–4)	Hofheinz Pavilion (4,358); Houston, TX
Wed, Feb 1; 8:00PM, CSS	at UAB	L 69–80	11–10 (3–5)	Bartow Arena (3,491); Birmingham, AL
Sat, Feb 4; 7:00PM	at Tulane	L 54–75	11–11 (3–6)	Avron B. Fogelman Arena (2,676); New Orleans, LA
Wed, Feb 8; 7:00PM, FSN	Rice	L 71–79	11–12 (3–7)	Hofheinz Pavilion (5,220); Houston, TX
Sat, Feb 11; 7:00PM	at Tulsa	L 48–72	11–13 (3–8)	Reynolds Center (4,764); Tulsa, OK
Sat, Feb 18; 8:00PM, CSS	Southern Miss	W 73–71	12–13 (4–8)	Hofheinz Pavilion (3,399); Houston, TX
Wed, Feb 22; 6:00PM	at Marshall	L 58–66	12–14 (4–9)	Cam Henderson Center (6,023); Huntington, WV
Sat, Feb 25; 7:00PM	SMU	W 62–59	13–14 (5–9)	Hofheinz Pavilion (5,282); Houston, TX
Wed, Feb 29; 7:00PM	Tulane	W 82–53	14–14 (6–9)	Hofheinz Pavilion (3,506); Houston, TX
Sat, Mar 3; 7:00PM, CSS	at Rice	W 76–75	15–14 (7–9)	Tudor Fieldhouse (1,943); Houston, TX
2012 Conference USA men's basketball tournament
Wed, Mar 7; 6:30PM, CSS	vs. UTEP; First Round	L 62–67 ^{OT}	15–15	FedEx Forum (7,824); Memphis, TN
*Non-conference game. ^{#}Rankings from AP Poll. (#) Tournament seedings in parentheses. All times are in Central Standard Time.
