= 2011–12 Tulsa Golden Hurricane men's basketball team =

American college basketball season

2011–12 Tulsa Golden Hurricane men's basketball
- Conference: Conference USA
- Record: 17–14 (10–6 C-USA)
- Head coach: Doug Wojcik (7th season)
- Assistant coaches: Jeremy Ballard; Emmett Davis; Terrence Rencher
- Home arena: Reynolds Center

2011–12 Conference USA men's basketball standings
| | Conf. | | | | Overall |
| Team | W | | L | PCT | W | | L | PCT |
|---|---|---|---|---|---|---|---|---|
| Memphis† | 13 | – | 3 | .813 | 26 | – | 8 | .765 |
| Southern Miss | 11 | – | 5 | .688 | 25 | – | 9 | .735 |
| Tulsa | 10 | – | 6 | .625 | 17 | – | 14 | .548 |
| UCF | 10 | – | 6 | .625 | 22 | – | 11 | .667 |
| UAB | 9 | – | 7 | .563 | 15 | – | 16 | .484 |
| Marshall | 9 | – | 7 | .563 | 21 | – | 14 | .600 |
| Rice | 8 | – | 8 | .500 | 18 | – | 15 | .545 |
| UTEP | 7 | – | 9 | .438 | 15 | – | 17 | .469 |
| Houston | 7 | – | 9 | .438 | 15 | – | 15 | .500 |
| East Carolina | 5 | – | 11 | .313 | 15 | – | 16 | .484 |
| SMU | 4 | – | 12 | .250 | 13 | – | 19 | .406 |
| Tulane | 3 | – | 13 | .188 | 15 | – | 19 | .441 |
† 2012 CUSA Tournament winner As of March 15, 2012; Rankings from AP Poll

The 2011–12 Tulsa Golden Hurricane men's basketball team represented the University of Tulsa during the 2011–12 NCAA Division I men's basketball season. The Golden Hurricane, led by seventh year head coach Doug Wojcik, played their home games at the Reynolds Center and are members of Conference USA. They finished the season 17–14, 10–6 in C-USA to finish in a tie for third place. They lost in the quarterfinals of the C-USA Basketball tournament to Marshall. They did not accept an invitation to a postseason tournament. Head coach Doug Wojcik was fired at the end of the season. He compiled a record of 140–92 in seven seasons and is the school’s all-time leader in coaching victories. He would be replaced by Danny Manning.

== Roster ==
| Number | Name | Position | Height | Weight | Year | Hometown |
|---|---|---|---|---|---|---|
| 1 | Rashad Smith | Forward | 6–7 | 195 | Freshman | Plano, Texas |
| 2 | Eric McClellan | Guard | 6–4 | 180 | Freshman | Austin, Texas |
| 3 | Jordan Clarkson | Guard | 6–4.5 | 188 | Sophomore | San Antonio, Texas |
| 4 | Jamie Booker | Guard | 6–2 | 200 | Junior | Tulsa, Oklahoma |
| 5 | Tim Peete | Guard | 6–4.5 | 200 | Sophomore | Memphis, Tennessee |
| 11 | Seven Idlet | Center | 6–11 | 247 | Senior | Prairie Grove, Arkansas |
| 13 | Jairus Coleman | Guard | 6–2 | 200 | Freshman | Houston, Texas |
| 14 | Will Sanger | Guard | 6–2 | 195 | Senior | Seattle, Washington |
| 15 | David Wishon | Center | 7–2 | 265 | Freshman | Concord, North Carolina |
| 23 | Blondy Baruti | Guard | 6–8.5 | 218 | Sophomore | Mesa, Arizona |
| 32 | Kodi Maduka | Forward | 6–11.5 | 226 | Sophomore | Arlington, Texas |
| 33 | Joe Richard | Forward | 6–6.5 | 249 | Senior | San Bernardino, California |
| 34 | Scottie Haralson | Guard | 6–4 | 236 | Junior | Jackson, Mississippi |
| 35 | D.J. Magley | Forward/Center | 6–9 | 265 | Senior | Bradenton, Florida |
| 44 | Brandon Swannegan | Forward | 6–7 | 187 | Freshman | Houston, Texas |

== Schedule ==
| Date time, TV | Rank^{#} | Opponent^{#} | Result | Record | Site (attendance) city, state |
Exhibition
| October 30, 2011*; 7:00 pm | | Southwest Baptist | W 92–73 | | Reynolds Center (3,678); Tulsa, OK |
| November 5, 2011*; 7:00 pm | | Catawba | W 93–59 | | Reynolds Center (853); Tulsa, OK |
Regular season
| November 11, 2011*; 7:00 pm | | Arkansas–Little Rock | W 65–49 | 1–0 | Reynolds Center (4,299); Tulsa, OK |
| November 13, 2011*; 2:00 pm | | Southeastern Louisiana | W 67–52 | 2–0 | Reynolds Center (3,750); Tulsa, OK |
| November 17, 2011*; 11:30 pm | | vs. Western Kentucky; Charleston Classic First Round | W 65–49 | 3–0 | TD Arena (NA); Charleston, SC |
| November 18, 2011*; 2:30 pm, ESPNU | | vs. Northwestern; Charleston Classic Semifinals | L 65–69 | 3–1 | TD Arena (1,711); Charleston, SC |
| November 20, 2011*; 5:00 pm, ESPNU | | vs. Saint Joseph's; Charleston Classic 3rd Place Game | L 75–79 | 3–2 | TD Arena (NA); Charleston, SC |
| November 22, 2011*; 7:00 pm | | at Jackson State | W 57–51 | 4–2 | Williams Assembly Center (405); Jackson, MS |
| November 26, 2011*; 7:00 pm | | at Missouri State | L 64–69 ^{OT} | 4–3 | JQH Arena (7,163); Springfield, MO |
| November 30, 2011*; 7:00 pm | | at Oklahoma State | L 56–59 | 4–4 | Gallagher-Iba Arena (9,448); Stillwater, OK |
| December 3, 2011*; 3:00 pm, CBSSN | | Arizona State | L 64–67 | 4–5 | Reynolds Center (3,891); Tulsa, OK |
| December 7, 2011*; 7:00 pm | | Wichita State | L 67–77 | 4–6 | Reynolds Center (4,360); Tulsa, OK |
| December 17, 2011*; 6:00 pm | | Texas–Arlington | W 80–75 ^{OT} | 5–6 | Reynolds Center (3,892); Tulsa, OK |
| December 19, 2011*; 7:00 pm | | No. 23 Creighton | L 64–83 | 5–7 | Reynolds Center (4,228); Tulsa, OK |
| December 28, 2011*; 8:30 pm | | Mercer | W 68–62 | 6–7 | Reynolds Center (3,922); Tulsa, OK |
| December 31, 2011*; 6:00 pm, CBSSN | | at TCU | W 74–66 | 7–7 | Daniel-Meyer Coliseum (4,201); Fort Worth, TX |
| January 4, 2012; 7:00 pm | | at Houston | L 69–70 ^{OT} | 7–8 (0–1) | Hofheinz Pavilion (3,218); Houston, TX |
| January 7, 2012; 7:00 pm | | SMU | L 55–57 | 7–9 (0–2) | Reynolds Center (4,341); Tulsa, OK |
| January 11, 2012; 7:00 pm | | UTEP | W 59–48 | 8–9 (1–2) | Reynolds Center (4,017); Tulsa, OK |
| January 14, 2012; 12:00 pm | | at East Carolina | W 70–67 | 9–9 (2–2) | Williams Arena at Minges Coliseum (4,584); Greenville, NC |
| January 18, 2012; 7:00 pm | | Tulane | W 60–56 | 10–9 (3–2) | Reynolds Center (4,108); Tulsa, OK |
| January 21, 2012; 7:00 pm | | at Rice | W 70–46 | 11–9 (4–2) | Tudor Fieldhouse (2,080); Houston, TX |
| January 25, 2012; 7:00 pm, CBSSN | | UCF | W 66–61 | 12–9 (5–2) | Reynolds Center (4,381); Tulsa, OK |
| January 28, 2012; 2:00 pm, FSN | | at SMU | W 66–60 | 13–9 (6–2) | Moody Coliseum (4,381); Dallas, TX |
| February 4, 2012; 7:00 pm | | Marshall | W 79–70 | 14–9 (7–2) | Reynolds Center (4,751); Tulsa, OK |
| February 8, 2012; 8:00 pm, CBSSN | | at UTEP | L 55–64 | 14–10 (7–3) | Don Haskins Center (6,771); El Paso, TX |
| February 11, 2012; 7:00 pm | | Houston | W 72–48 | 15–10 (8–3) | Reynolds Center (4,764); Tulsa, OK |
| February 15, 2012; 7:00 pm | | at Southern Miss | L 69–77 ^{OT} | 15–11 (8–4) | Reed Green Coliseum (3,561); Hattiesburg, MS |
| February 18, 2012; 7:00 pm | | Rice | W 69–50 | 16–11 (9–4) | Reynolds Center (5,511); Tulsa, OK |
| February 25, 2012; 7:00 pm, CSS | | at Tulane | W 73–69 | 17–11 (10–4) | Fogelman Arena (2,195); New Orleans, LA |
| February 29, 2012; 7:00 pm, CBSSN | | at UAB | L 64–68 | 17–12 (10–5) | Bartow Arena (5,176); Birmingham, Alabama |
| March 3, 2012; 11:00 am, CBS | | Memphis | L 66–78 | 17–13 (10–6) | Reynolds Center (6,131); Tulsa, OK |
2012 Conference USA men's basketball tournament
| March 8, 2012; 2:00 pm, CBSSN | | vs. Marshall; Quarterfinals | L 100–105 ^{3OT} | 17–14 | FedExForum (7,930); Memphis, Tennessee |
*Non-conference game. ^{#}Rankings from AP Poll. (#) Tournament seedings in parentheses. All times are in Central Time.
