= 2011–12 Southern Miss Golden Eagles basketball team =

American college basketball season

2011–12 Southern Miss Golden Eagles men's basketball

NCAA Tournament, Round of 64
- Conference: Conference USA
- Record: 25–9 (11–5 C-USA)
- Head coach: Larry Eustachy (8th season)
- Assistant coaches: Steve Barnes; Ross Hodge; Leonard Perry
- Home arena: Reed Green Coliseum

2011–12 Conference USA men's basketball standings
	Conf.				Overall
Team	W		L	PCT	W		L	PCT
Memphis†	13	–	3	.813	26	–	8	.765
Southern Miss	11	–	5	.688	25	–	9	.735
Tulsa	10	–	6	.625	17	–	14	.548
UCF	10	–	6	.625	22	–	11	.667
UAB	9	–	7	.563	15	–	16	.484
Marshall	9	–	7	.563	21	–	14	.600
Rice	8	–	8	.500	18	–	15	.545
UTEP	7	–	9	.438	15	–	17	.469
Houston	7	–	9	.438	15	–	15	.500
East Carolina	5	–	11	.313	15	–	16	.484
SMU	4	–	12	.250	13	–	19	.406
Tulane	3	–	13	.188	15	–	19	.441
† 2012 CUSA Tournament winner As of March 15, 2012; Rankings from AP Poll

The 2011–12 Southern Miss Golden Eagles basketball team represented the University of Southern Mississippi during the 2011–12 NCAA Division I men's basketball season. The Golden Eagles, led by eighth year head coach Larry Eustachy, played their home games at Reed Green Coliseum and are members of Conference USA. They finished the season 25–9, 11–5 in C-USA play to finish in second place behind Memphis. They lost in the semifinals of the C-USA Basketball tournament to Marshall. They received an at-large bid to the 2012 NCAA basketball tournament where they lost in the second round to Kansas State.

== Roster ==
Number	Name	Position	Height	Weight	Year	Hometown
0	LaShay Page	Guard	6–2	190	Junior	Dillon, South Carolina
1	Maurice Bolden	Forward	6–10	200	Senior	Jackson, Mississippi
2	Darnell Dodson	Guard	6–7	215	Senior	Greenbelt, Maryland
4	Richard Carlisle	Guard	6–1	190	Junior	Meridian, Mississippi
5	Neil Watson	Guard	5–11	170	Sophomore	Kansas City, Kansas
10	Cedric Jenkins	Guard	6–2	195	Sophomore	LaPlace, Louisiana
11	Alahjah Franklin	Guard	5–9	170	Freshman	Memphis, Tennessee
12	Rahard McGill	Guard	6–5	205	Junior	Havana, Florida
15	Torye Pelham	Forward	6–6	225	Senior	Nashville, Tennessee
23	Angelo Johnson	Guard	6–0	185	Senior	Minneapolis, Minnesota
24	Jonathan Mills	Forward	6–6	230	Junior	Chicago, Illinois
25	Ahyaro Phillips	Forward	6–8	215	Senior	New Orleans, Louisiana
32	Christian Robbins	Forward	6–11	235	Freshman	Foxworth, Mississippi
42	Keith DeWitt	Forward	6–11	220	Freshman	High Point, North Carolina

== Schedule ==
Date time, TV	Rank^{#}	Opponent^{#}	Result	Record	Site (attendance) city, state
Exhibition
10/27/2011*; 7:00 pm		Loyola New Orleans	W 88–53		Reed Green Coliseum (2,395); Hattiesburg, MS
11/08/2011*; 7:00 pm		William Carey	W 78–53		Reed Green Coliseum (2,833); Hattiesburg, MS
Regular Season
11/12/2011*; 12:00 pm		Spring Hill	W 76–41	1–0	Reed Green Coliseum (2,143); Hattiesburg, MS
11/17/2011*; 8:00 pm		at Denver	L 52–59	1–1	Magness Arena (5,222); Denver, CO
11/19/2011*; 8:00 pm		at Colorado State	W 79–58	2–1	Moby Arena (2,275); Fort Collins, CO
11/24/2011*; 11:30 pm, FCS		vs. UC Irvine; Great Alaska Shootout First Round	W 78–67	3–1	Sullivan Arena (4,278); Anchorage, AK
11/25/2011*; 11:00 pm, FCS		vs. New Mexico State; Great Alaska Shootout Semifinals	W 80–72	4–1	Sullivan Arena (4,744); Anchorage, AK
11/26/2011*; 9:00 pm, FCS		vs. Murray State; Great Alaska Shootout Finals	L 81–90 ^{2OT}	4–2	Sullivan Arena (5,057); Anchorage, AK
12/04/2011*; 1:00 pm		New Mexico State	W 74–66	5–2	Reed Green Coliseum (2,606); Hattiesburg, MS
12/07/2011*; 7:00 pm		at South Alabama	W 67–54	6–2	Mitchell Center (3,461); Mobile, AL
12/10/2011*; 7:00 pm		Louisiana Tech	W 78–62	7–2	Reed Green Coliseum (2,714); Hattiesburg, MS
12/17/2011*; 3:30 pm, FSN		Ole Miss	W 86–82	8–2	Reed Green Coliseum (5,195); Hattiesburg, MS
12/19/2011*; 9:00 pm, FSN		at Arizona State	W 64–61	9–2	Wells Fargo Arena (4,738); Tempe, AZ
12/22/2011*; 7:00 pm		South Florida	W 53–51	10–2	Reed Green Coliseum (3,037); Hattiesburg, MS
12/27/2011*; 7:00 pm		Belhaven Blazers	W 93–48	11–2	Reed Green Coliseum (2,871); Hattiesburg, MS
12/29/2011*; 7:00 pm		Alcorn State	W 80–49	12–2	Reed Green Coliseum (3,017); Hattiesburg, MS
12/31/2011*; 1:00 pm		at McNeese State	W 65–56	13–2	Burton Coliseum (986); Lake Charles, LA
01/04/2012; 7:00 pm		East Carolina	W 78–76	14–2 (1–0)	Reed Green Coliseum (2,889); Hattiesburg, MS
01/07/2012; 3:00 pm		at Tulane	W 71–66 ^{OT}	15–2 (2–0)	Fogelman Arena (2,140); New Orleans, LA
01/11/2012; 6:00 pm, CSS		at Memphis	L 58–60	15–3 (2–1)	FedExForum (16,246); Memphis, TN
01/14/2012; 1:00 pm, FSN		UAB	W 59–55	16–3 (3–1)	Reed Green Coliseum (3,111); Hattiesburg, MS
01/21/2012; 5:00 pm, CSS		Marshall	W 67–63	17–3 (4–1)	Reed Green Coliseum (4,757); Hattiesburg, MS
01/25/2012; 6:00 pm, CSS		at East Carolina	W 72–60	18–3 (5–1)	Williams Arena at Minges Coliseum (4,235); Greenville, NC
01/28/2012; 6:00 pm, BHSN		at UCF	W 78–65	19–3 (6–1)	UCF Arena (7,790); Orlando, FL
02/01/2012; 7:00 pm, CBSSN		Memphis	W 75–72	20–3 (7–1)	Reed Green Coliseum (7,964); Hattiesburg, MS
02/08/2012; 7:00 pm		at UAB	L 61–71	20–4 (7–2)	Bartow Arena (4,721); Birmingham, AL
02/11/2012; 4:00 pm		UCF	W 78–74	21–4 (8–2)	Reed Green Coliseum (4,482); Hattiesburg, MS
02/15/2012; 7:00 pm		Tulsa	W 77–69	22–4 (9–2)	Reed Green Coliseum (3,561); Hattiesburg, MS
02/18/2012; 8:00 pm, CSS		at Houston	L 71–73	22–5 (9–3)	Hofheinz Pavilion (3,399); Houston, TX
02/22/2012; 8:00 pm		at UTEP	L 68–76 ^{2OT}	22–6 (9–4)	Don Haskins Center (9,564); El Paso, TX
02/25/2012; 7:00 pm, CSS		Rice	W 58–56	23–6 (10–4)	Reed Green Coliseum (3,965); Hattiesburg, MS
02/29/2012; 7:00 pm		SMU	W 67–60	24–6 (11–4)	Reed Green Coliseum (3,934); Hattiesburg, MS
03/03/2012; 2:00 pm		at Marshall	L 75–79	24–7 (11–5)	Cam Henderson Center (5,947); Huntington, WV
Conference USA Tournament
03/08/2012; 12:00 pm, CBSSN		vs. East Carolina; Quarterfinals	W 81–78 ^{OT}	25–7	FedExForum (7,930); Memphis, TN
03/09/2012; 3:00 pm, CBSSN		vs. Marshall; Semifinals	L 62–73	25–8	FedExForum (14,441); Memphis, TN
NCAA Tournament
03/15/2012*; 11:40 am, truTV	(E9)	vs. (E8) Kansas State; Second Round	L 64–70	25–9	Consol Energy Center (18,568); Pittsburgh, PA
*Non-conference game. ^{#}Rankings from AP Poll. (#) Tournament seedings in parentheses. All times are in Central Time.
