= 2011–12 Mercer Bears men's basketball team =

American college basketball season

2011–12 Mercer Bears men's basketball

CollegeInsider.com Tournament champions
- Conference: Atlantic Sun Conference
- Record: 27–11 (13–5 A-Sun)
- Head coach: Bob Hoffman (4th season)
- Assistant coaches: Spencer Wright; Doug Esleeck; Jake Nelp
- Home arena: University Center

2011–12 Atlantic Sun men's basketball standings
| | Conf. | | | | Overall |
| Team | W | | L | PCT | W | | L | PCT |
|---|---|---|---|---|---|---|---|---|
| Belmont† | 16 | – | 2 | .889 | 27 | – | 8 | .771 |
| Mercer | 13 | – | 5 | .722 | 27 | – | 11 | .711 |
| USC Upstate | 13 | – | 5 | .722 | 21 | – | 13 | .618 |
| East Tennessee State | 10 | – | 8 | .556 | 17 | – | 14 | .548 |
| North Florida | 10 | – | 8 | .556 | 16 | – | 16 | .500 |
| Florida Gulf Coast | 8 | – | 10 | .444 | 15 | – | 17 | .469 |
| Lipscomb | 8 | – | 10 | .444 | 13 | – | 18 | .419 |
| Jacksonville | 6 | – | 12 | .333 | 8 | – | 22 | .267 |
| Stetson | 6 | – | 12 | .333 | 9 | – | 20 | .310 |
| Kennesaw State | 0 | – | 18 | .000 | 3 | – | 28 | .097 |
† 2012 Atlantic Sun Tournament winner As of March 28, 2012; Rankings from AP Poll

The 2011–12 Mercer Bears men's basketball team represented Mercer University during the 2011–12 NCAA Division I men's basketball season. The Bears, led by fourth year head coach Bob Hoffman, played their home games at the University Center and are members of the Atlantic Sun Conference. They finished the season 27–11, 13–5 in A-Sun play to finish in a tie for second place. They lost in the semifinals of the Atlantic Sun Basketball tournament to Florida Gulf Coast. They were invited to the 2012 CollegeInsider.com Tournament where they defeated Tennessee State, Georgia State, Old Dominion, Fairfield, and Utah State to be the 2012 CIT Champions.

== Roster ==
| Number | Name | Position | Height | Weight | Year | Hometown |
|---|---|---|---|---|---|---|
| 0 | R.J. Miskimon | Guard | 6–2 | 190 | Sophomore | Fort Worth, Texas |
| 1 | Kymon Woods | Guard | 6–4 | 190 | Freshman | Gainesville, Georgia |
| 2 | Travis Smith | Guard | 6–3 | 185 | Junior | Johns Island, South Carolina |
| 3 | Kevin Canevari | Guard | 5–11 | 165 | Sophomore | Charlotte, North Carolina |
| 5 | Bud Thomas | Forward | 6–6 | 200 | Sophomore | Highlands Ranch, Colorado |
| 14 | T.J. Hallice | Forward | 6–9 | 205 | Freshman | Weddington, North Carolina |
| 15 | Justin Cecil | Forward | 6–8 | 225 | Senior | Lakeland, Florida |
| 20 | Jakob Gollon | Forward | 6–6 | 200 | Sophomore | Stevens Point, Wisconsin |
| 21 | Langston Hall | Guard | 6–4 | 180 | Sophomore | Atlanta, Georgia |
| 22 | Darious Moten | Forward | 6–6 | 195 | Freshman | Bowdon, Georgia |
| 23 | Chris Smith | Guard | 6–1 | 170 | Junior | Dublin, Georgia |
| 32 | Shaquille Harris | Guard | 6–2 | 190 | Junior | Americus, Georgia |
| 34 | Jibri Bryan | Guard | 6–3 | 180 | Junior | Savannah, Georgia |
| 44 | Marquisse Jackson | Forward | 6–5 | 183 | Junior | Bartlesville, Oklahoma |
| 45 | Monty Brown | Center | 6–11 | 250 | Sophomore | Liberty Mounds, Oklahoma |
| 50 | Paul Larsen | Forward | 6–7 | 220 | Sophomore | Mooresville, North Carolina |
| 52 | Daniel Coursey | Forward | 6–10 | 220 | Sophomore | Savannah, Georgia |

== Schedule ==
| Date time, TV | Rank^{#} | Opponent^{#} | Result | Record | Site (attendance) city, state |
Exhibition
| 11/03/2011*; 7:30 am | | Georgia College | W 58–57 | | University Center (1,473); Macon, GA |
Regular season
| 11/12/2011*; 3:00 pm | | at Emory | W 66–57 | 1–0 | University Center (NA); Macon, GA |
| 11/14/2011*; 7:00 pm | | at No. 24 Missouri; CBE Classic | L 63–81 | 1–1 | Mizzou Arena (5,778); Columbia, MO |
| 11/17/2011*; 3:30 pm | | at Furman | W 66–46 | 2–1 | Timmons Arena (1,269); Greenville, SC |
| 11/21/2011*; 7:00 pm | | Sam Houston State; CBE Classic | W 60–38 | 3–1 | University Center (1,537); Macon, GA |
| 11/22/2011*; 7:00 pm | | Niagara; CBE Classic | W 74–55 | 4–1 | University Center (1,422); Macon, GA |
| 11/23/2011*; 7:00 pm | | South Dakota State; CBE Classic | L 61–74 | 4–2 | University Center (1,568); Macon, GA |
| 12/01/2011; 7:15 pm | | at Lipscomb | W 79–72 | 5–2 (1–0) | Allen Arena (1,730); Nashville, TN |
| 12/03/2011; 4:15 pm | | at Belmont | L 78–82 | 5–3 (1–1) | Curb Event Center (1,640); Nashville, TN |
| 12/07/2011*; 8:00 pm | | at Samford | W 83–78 | 6–3 | Pete Hanna Center (1,036); Homewood, AL |
| 12/10/2011*; 7:00 pm | | Chattanooga | W 67–56 | 7–3 | University Center (1,795); Macon, GA |
| 12/18/2011*; 12:00 pm | | at Seton Hall | L 77–80 ^{OT} | 7–4 | Prudential Center (6,502); Newark, NJ |
| 12/20/2011*; 7:00 pm | | at Georgia | L 58–72 | 7–5 | Stegeman Coliseum (5,654); Athens, GA |
| 12/22/2011*; 7:00 pm | | at Georgia Tech | W 65–59 | 8–5 | Arena at Gwinnett Center (3,841); Duluth, GA |
| 12/28/2011*; 7:30 pm | | at Tulsa | L 62–68 | 8–6 | Reynolds Center (3,922); Tulsa, OK |
| 12/30/2011*; 7:00 pm | | at Navy | W 65–56 | 9–6 | Alumni Hall (2,555); Annapolis, MD |
| 01/02/2012; 7:30 pm | | Florida Gulf Coast | W 76–54 | 10–6 (2–1) | University Center (2,075); Macon, GA |
| 01/04/2012; 7:00 pm | | Stetson | W 75–59 | 11–6 (3–1) | University Center (1,750); Macon, GA |
| 01/07/2012; 7:00 pm | | at East Tennessee State | L 61–76 | 11–7 (3–2) | ETSU/Mountain States Health Alliance Athletic Center (3,221); Johnson City, TN |
| 01/09/2012; 7:30 pm | | at USC Upstate | W 73–66 | 12–7 (4–2) | G. B. Hodge Center (694); Spartanburg, SC |
| 01/13/2012; 7:00 pm, CSS | | Kennesaw State | W 81–51 | 13–7 (5–2) | University Center (2,856); Macon, GA |
| 01/21/2012; 2:00 pm | | North Florida | W 69–58 | 14–7 (6–2) | University Center (2,951); Macon, GA |
| 01/23/2012; 7:00 pm | | Jacksonville | W 75–65 | 15–7 (7–2) | University Center (2,210); Macon, GA |
| 01/28/2012; 3:15 pm | | at Stetson | W 75–64 | 16–7 (8–2) | Edmunds Center (1,929); DeLand, FL |
| 01/30/2012; 7:00 pm | | at Florida Gulf Coast | W 75–66 | 17–7 (9–2) | Alico Arena (1,738); Fort Myers, FL |
| 02/04/2012; 4:30 pm | | USC Upstate | W 61–47 | 18–7 (10–2) | University Center (3,007); Macon, GA |
| 02/06/2012; 7:00 pm | | East Tennessee State | W 54–46 | 19–7 (11–2) | University Center (2,265); Macon, GA |
| 02/10/2012; 7:00 pm, CSS | | at Kennesaw State | W 61–57 | 20–7 (12–2) | KSU Convocation Center (4,991); Kennesaw, GA |
| 02/18/2012; 3:30 pm | | at Jacksonville | L 75–81 | 20–8 (12–3) | Jacksonville Veterans Memorial Arena (1,111); Jacksonville, FL |
| 02/20/2012; 7:00 pm | | at North Florida | L 66–75 | 20–9 (12–4) | UNF Arena (1,397); Jacksonville, FL |
| 02/23/2012; 7:30 pm | | Lipscomb | W 63–54 | 21–9 (13–4) | University Center (2,450); Macon, GA |
| 02/25/2012; 4:30 pm | | Belmont | L 61–62 | 21–10 (13–5) | University Center (NA); Macon, GA |
2012 Atlantic Sun men's basketball tournament
| 02/29/2012; 8:30 pm, ESPN3 | | Lipscomb; Quarterfinals | W 61–53 | 22–10 | University Center (2,621); Macon, GA |
| 03/02/2012; 8:30 pm, ESPN3 | | Florida Gulf Coast; Semifinals | L 58–62 | 22–11 | University Center (3,497); Macon, GA |
2012 CIT
| 03/13/2012*; 7:00 pm | | Tennessee State; First Round | W 68–60 | 23–11 | University Center (1,773); Macon, GA |
| 03/17/2012*; 4:00 pm | | Georgia State; Second Round | W 64–59 | 24–11 | University Center (2,132); Macon, GA |
| 03/21/2012*; 7:00 pm | | at Old Dominion; Quarterfinals | W 79–73 | 25–11 | Ted Constant Convocation Center (3,412); Norfolk, VA |
| 03/24/2012*; 7:00 pm | | at Fairfield; Semifinals | W 64–59 | 26–11 | Alumni Hall (1,557); Fairfield, CT |
| 03/28/2012*; 9:00 pm, FCS Central | | at Utah State; Championship Game | W 70–67 | 27–11 | Smith Spectrum (6,154); Logan, UT |
*Non-conference game. ^{#}Rankings from AP Poll. (#) Tournament seedings in parentheses. All times are in Eastern Time.
