= 2011–12 East Carolina Pirates men's basketball team =

American college basketball season

2011–12 East Carolina Pirates men's basketball
- Conference: Conference USA
- Record: 15–16 (5–11 C-USA)
- Head coach: Jeff Lebo
- Assistant coaches: Tim Craft; Michael Perry; Ken Potosnak
- Home arena: Williams Arena

2011–12 Conference USA men's basketball standings
	Conf.				Overall
Team	W		L	PCT	W		L	PCT
Memphis†	13	–	3	.813	26	–	8	.765
Southern Miss	11	–	5	.688	25	–	9	.735
Tulsa	10	–	6	.625	17	–	14	.548
UCF	10	–	6	.625	22	–	11	.667
UAB	9	–	7	.563	15	–	16	.484
Marshall	9	–	7	.563	21	–	14	.600
Rice	8	–	8	.500	18	–	15	.545
UTEP	7	–	9	.438	15	–	17	.469
Houston	7	–	9	.438	15	–	15	.500
East Carolina	5	–	11	.313	15	–	16	.484
SMU	4	–	12	.250	13	–	19	.406
Tulane	3	–	13	.188	15	–	19	.441
† 2012 CUSA Tournament winner As of March 15, 2012; Rankings from AP Poll

The 2011–12 East Carolina Pirates men's basketball team represented East Carolina University during the 2011–2012 NCAA Division I basketball season. The Pirates were coached by second year head coach Jeff Lebo. The Pirates played their home games at Williams Arena at Minges Coliseum and were members of Conference USA. They finished the season 15–16, 5–11 in C-USA play.

== Recruiting ==
College recruiting information
Name	Hometown	School	Height	Weight	Commit date
Shamarr Bowden; SG	Marianna, FL	Chipola College	6 ft 3 in (1.91 m)	180 lb (82 kg)	Nov 12, 2010
Shamarr Bowden; SG	Recruit ratings: Scout: Rivals: (N/A)				
Paris Roberts-Campbell; SG	Charlotte, NC	United Faith Christian Academy	6 ft 2 in (1.88 m)	170 lb (77 kg)	Aug 30, 2010
Paris Roberts-Campbell; SG	Recruit ratings: Scout: Rivals: (84)				
Maurice Kemp; PF	Danville, VA	Dan River High School	6 ft 6 in (1.98 m)	180 lb (82 kg)	Mar 31, 2011
Maurice Kemp; PF	Recruit ratings: Scout: Rivals: (N/A)				
Paul Stone; SG	Miami, FL	Miami-Dade Community College	6 ft 6 in (1.98 m)	195 lb (88 kg)	Nov 11, 2010
Paul Stone; SG	Recruit ratings: Scout: Rivals: (75)				
Overall recruit ranking:
Note: In many cases, Scout, Rivals, 247Sports, On3, and ESPN may conflict in their listings of height and weight.; In these cases, the average was taken. ESPN grades are on a 100-point scale.; Sources: "East Carolina Basketball Commitments". Rivals.; "2011 East Carolina Basketball Commits". Scout.; "ESPN". ESPN.; "Scout.com Team Recruiting Rankings". Scout.; "2011 Team Ranking". Rivals.

== Roster ==
2011–12 East Carolina Pirates men's basketball team
Players
Coaches

Pos.	#	Name	Height	Weight	Year	Hometown
G	0	Miguel Paul	6 ft 1 in (1.85 m)	165 lb (75 kg)	Jr	Winter Haven, Florida
F	1	Darrius Morrow	6 ft 8 in (2.03 m)	245 lb (111 kg)	Sr	Atlanta, Georgia
F	2	Maurice Kemp	6 ft 8 in (2.03 m)	185 lb (84 kg)	Jr	Miami, Florida
G	3	Petar Torlak	6 ft 2 in (1.88 m)	185 lb (84 kg)	So	Belgrade, Serbia
G	10	Francis Edosomwan	6 ft 4 in (1.93 m)	200 lb (91 kg)	Fr	Charlotte, North Carolina
G	11	Corvonn Gaines	6 ft 4 in (1.93 m)	215 lb (98 kg)	Jr	Madison, Wisconsin
F	12	Robert Sampson	6 ft 8 in (2.03 m)	215 lb (98 kg)	So	Atlanta, Georgia
G	20	Shamarr Bowden	6 ft 4 in (1.93 m)	170 lb (77 kg)	Jr	Greensboro, North Carolina
G	22	Paris Roberts-Campbell	6 ft 3 in (1.91 m)	175 lb (79 kg)	Fr	Charlotte, North Carolina
G	23	Erin Straughn	6 ft 6 in (1.98 m)	205 lb (93 kg)	Jr	Pensacola, Florida
F	25	Austin Steed	6 ft 8 in (2.03 m)	245 lb (111 kg)	Sr	Hephzibah, Georgia
F/C	35	Darius Morales	6 ft 8 in (2.03 m)	205 lb (93 kg)	RS So	Orlando, Florida
F	42	Yasin Kolo (injured) (redshirt)	6 ft 10 in (2.08 m)	240 lb (109 kg)	Fr	Goettingen, Germany
G		Akeem Richmond	6 ft 1 in (1.85 m)	180 lb (82 kg)	Jr	Sanford, North Carolina

Head coach

- Jeff Lebo (North Carolina)

Assistant coach(es)

- Michael Perry (Richmond)
- Tim Craft (Florida)
- Ken Potosnak (Randolph–Macon)

Legend

- (C) Team captain
- (S) Suspended
- (I) Ineligible
- (W) Walk-on
- Injured
- Current redshirt

Roster
Last update: 5 December 2011

== Schedule ==
Date time, TV	Rank^{#}	Opponent^{#}	Result	Record	Site (attendance) city, state
November 11*; 7:00pm		Milligan	W 101–45	1–0	Williams Arena at Minges Coliseum (4,678); Greenville, NC
November 14*; 7:00 pm		at Campbell	L 74–76	1–1	John W. Pope, Jr. Convocation Center (3,028); Buies Creek, NC
November 17*; 7:00pm		Coker	W 63–50	2–1	Williams Arena at Minges Coliseum (4,310); Greenville, NC
November 22*; 7:00pm		at Appalachian State	W 67–47	3–1	Time Warner Cable Arena (3,719); Charlotte, NC
November 26*; 1:00pm		Chowan	W 78–62	4–1	Williams Arena at Minges Coliseum (3,821); Greenville, NC
November 29*; 7:00pm		at Old Dominion	L 58–63	4–2	Ted Constant Convocation Center (7,295); Norfolk, VA
December 3*; 4:00pm, MASN		Charlotte	L 64–76	4–3	Williams Arena at Minges Coliseum (5,273); Greenville, NC
December 6*; 7:00pm		Massachusetts	L 58–63	4–4	Williams Arena at Minges Coliseum (4,419); Greenville, NC
December 16*; 7:00pm		at UNC Greensboro	W 71–62	5–4	Greensboro Coliseum (3,012); Greensboro, NC
December 19*; 7:00pm		Coastal Carolina	W 76–51	6–4	Williams Arena at Minges Coliseum (4,175); Greenville, NC
December 22*; 7:00pm		Gardner–Webb	W 69–55	7–4	Williams Arena at Minges Coliseum (4,721); Greenville, NC
December 29*; 7:00pm		NC Central	W 84–76	8–4	Williams Arena at Minges Coliseum (6,341); Greenville, NC
December 31*; 1:00pm		UVA-Wise	W 91–56	9–4	Williams Arena at Minges Coliseum (4,362); Greenville, NC
January 4; 8:00pm		at Southern Miss	L 76–78	9–5 (0–1)	Reed Green Coliseum (2,889); Hattiesburg, MS
January 7; 5:00pm		UCF	L 63–81	9–6 (0–2)	Williams Arena at Minges Coliseum (6,095); Greenville, NC
January 14; 1:00pm, WITN-TV		Tulsa	L 67–70	9–7 (0–3)	Williams Arena at Minges Coliseum (4,584); Greenville, NC
January 18; 9:00pm		at UTEP	L 56–70	9–8 (0–4)	Don Haskins Center (6,297); El Paso, TX
January 21; 8:00pm		at Houston	L 76–82	9–9 (0–5)	Hofheinz Pavilion (2,954); Houston, TX
January 25; 7:00pm		Southern Miss	L 60–72	9–10 (0–6)	Williams Arena at Minges Coliseum (4,235); Greenville, NC
January 28; 8:00pm		at UAB	W 73–66	10–10 (1–6)	Bartow Arena (4,023); Birmingham, AL
February 1; 7:00pm		SMU	W 62–43	11–10 (2–6)	Williams Arena at Minges Coliseum (4,281); Greenville, NC
February 4; 5:00pm		Rice	W 82–68	12–10 (3–6)	Williams Arena at Minges Coliseum ( 5,212); Greenville, NC
February 8; 7:00pm		Memphis	L 59–70	12–11 (3–7)	Williams Arena at Minges Coliseum ( 5,460); Greenville, NC
February 11; 7:00pm, WITN-TV		at Marshall	L 68–78	12–12 (3–8)	Cam Henderson Center ( 6,447); Huntington, WV
February 18; 7:00pm		at UCF	L 55–64	12–13 (3–9)	UCF Arena (7,025); Orlando, FL
February 22; 8:00pm		at Memphis	L 47–70	12–14 (3–10)	FedExForum (6,023); Memphis, TN
February 25; 5:00pm		UAB	L 57–61	12–15 (3–11)	Williams Arena at Minges Coliseum (5,308); Greenville, NC
February 29; 7:00pm, WITN-TV		Marshall	W 69–68 ^{OT}	13–15 (4–11)	Williams Arena at Minges Coliseum (4,334); Greenville, NC
March 3; 8:00pm		at Tulane	W 66–49	14–15 (5–11)	Avron B. Fogelman Arena (2,712); New Orleans, LA
2012 Conference USA men's basketball tournament^{†}
March 7; 1:00pm		vs. Rice; First Round	W 68–66	15–15 (5–11)	FedExForum; Memphis, TN
March 8; 1:00pm, CBS Sports Network		vs. Southern Miss; Quarterfinals	W 81-78 ^{OT}		FedExForum; Memphis, TN
*Non-conference game. ^{#}Rankings from AP Poll. ^{†}Postseason ranks represent seeds in the applicable tournament. (#) Tournament seedings in parentheses. All times are in Eastern Standard Time.
