= 2011–12 Rice Owls men's basketball team =

American college basketball season

2011–12 Rice Owls men's basketball

CIT, Quarterfinals
- Conference: Conference USA
- Record: 19–16 (8–8 C-USA)
- Head coach: Ben Braun (4th season)
- Assistant coaches: Louis Reynaud; Mike Roberts; Marco Marcos
- Home arena: Tudor Fieldhouse

2011–12 Conference USA men's basketball standings
	Conf.				Overall
Team	W		L	PCT	W		L	PCT
Memphis†	13	–	3	.813	26	–	8	.765
Southern Miss	11	–	5	.688	25	–	9	.735
Tulsa	10	–	6	.625	17	–	14	.548
UCF	10	–	6	.625	22	–	11	.667
UAB	9	–	7	.563	15	–	16	.484
Marshall	9	–	7	.563	21	–	14	.600
Rice	8	–	8	.500	18	–	15	.545
UTEP	7	–	9	.438	15	–	17	.469
Houston	7	–	9	.438	15	–	15	.500
East Carolina	5	–	11	.313	15	–	16	.484
SMU	4	–	12	.250	13	–	19	.406
Tulane	3	–	13	.188	15	–	19	.441
† 2012 CUSA Tournament winner As of March 15, 2012; Rankings from AP Poll

The 2011–12 Rice Owls men's basketball team represented Rice University during the 2011–12 NCAA Division I men's basketball season. The Owls, led by fourth year head coach Ben Braun, played their home games at the Tudor Fieldhouse and are members of Conference USA. They finished the season 19–16, 8–8 in C-USA to finish in seventh place. They lost in the first round of the C-USA Basketball tournament to East Carolina. They were invited to the 2012 CollegeInsider.com Tournament where they defeated Louisiana in the first round and Drake in the second round before falling in the quarterfinals to Oakland.

== Roster ==
Number	Name	Position	Height	Weight	Year	Hometown
0	Ahmad Ibrahim	Forward	6–6	220	Freshman	Beirut, Lebanon
1	Nate Schwarze	Guard	5–11	182	Senior	Chelsea, Michigan
3	Tamir Jackson	Guard	6–3	194	Junior	Paterson, New Jersey
4	Connor Frizzelle	Guard	6–1	191	Senior	Red Oak, Texas
5	Emerson Herndon	Forward	6–9	235	Senior	Houston, Texas
10	Dan Peera	Guard	6–0	185	Freshman	Concord, California
12	Jarelle Reischel	Forward	6–6	212	Freshman	Frankfurt, Germany
14	Arsalan Kazemi	Forward	6–7	220	Junior	Isfahan, Iran
15	Julian DeBose	Guard	6–4	196	Freshman	Washington, D.C.
20	Lucas Kuipers	Forward	6–8	217	Senior	Rochester, Minnesota
30	David Chadwick	Forward	6–9	220	Sophomore	Charlotte, North Carolina
31	Dylan Ennis	Guard	6–2	182	Freshman	Brampton, Ontario
34	Omar Oraby	Center	7–2	265	Sophomore	Cairo, Egypt
41	Seth Gearhart	Forward	6–7	208	Freshman	Wilsonville, Oregon

== Schedule ==
Date time, TV	Rank^{#}	Opponent^{#}	Result	Record	Site (attendance) city, state
Regular season
11/12/2011*; 7:00 pm		New Orleans	W 83–49	1–0	Tudor Fieldhouse (1,719); Houston, TX
11/17/2011*; 7:00 pm		Southern; South Padre Island Invitational	W 80–65	2–0	Tudor Fieldhouse (1,308); Houston, TX
11/22/2011*; 7:00 pm		Florida A&M; South Padre Island Invitational	W 75–59	3–0	Tudor Fieldhouse (1,396); Houston, TX
11/25/2011*; 5:00 pm		vs. Northern Iowa; South Padre Island Invitational	L 60–64	3–1	South Padre Island Convention Centre (556); South Padre Island, TX
11/26/2011*; 6:30 pm, CBSSN		vs. Iowa State; South Padre Island Invitational	L 63–90	3–2	South Padre Island Convention Centre (660); South Padre Island, TX
11/20/2011*; 3:00 pm		Maryland Eastern Shore	W 81–49	4–2	Tudor Fieldhouse (1,245); Houston, TX
11/30/2011*; 7:00 pm		at Houston Baptist	W 78–66	5–2	Sharp Gymnasium (1,041); Houston, TX
12/03/2011*; 2:00 pm		St. Thomas (TX)	W 81–67	6–2	Tudor Fieldhouse (836); Houston, TX
12/14/2011*; 7:00 pm		Louisiana College	W 109–51	7–2	Tudor Fieldhouse (603); Houston, TX
12/17/2011*; 7:00 pm		Lamar	L 81–87	7–3	Tudor Fieldhouse (1,516); Houston, TX
12/19/2011*; 8:00 pm, CSS		Temple	L 70–77	7–4	Tudor Fieldhouse (1,483); Houston, TX
12/22/2011*; 7:00 pm, FSSW		at Texas A&M	W 65–58	8–4	Reed Arena (8,284); College Station, TX
12/28/2011*; 7:00 pm		Texas A&M–Corpus Christi	W 78–66	9–4	Tudor Fieldhouse (1,479); Houston, TX
12/31/2011*; 1:00 pm, LHN		at Texas	L 59–73	9–5	Frank Erwin Center (14,506); Austin, TX
01/04/2012*; 7:00 pm, The Mtn.		at TCU	L 74–78	9–6	Daniel–Meyer Coliseum (3,972); Fort Worth, TX
01/07/2012; 7:00 pm		Marshall	L 61–63	9–7 (0–1)	Tudor Fieldhouse (1,237); Houston, TX
01/11/2012; 7:00 pm		at SMU	W 68–52	10–7 (1–1)	Moody Coliseum (1,951); Dallas, TX
01/14/2012; 7:00 pm		at Tulane	W 50–49	11–7 (2–1)	Fogelman Arena (1,740); New Orleans, LA
01/18/2012; 7:00 pm		UAB	L 60–61 ^{OT}	11–8 (2–2)	Tudor Fieldhouse (1,371); Houston, TX
01/21/2012; 7:00 pm		Tulsa	L 46–70	11–9 (2–3)	Tudor Fieldhouse (2,080); Houston, TX
01/25/2012; 7:00 pm, SPSO		at Memphis	L 51–73	11–10 (2–4)	FedExForum (15,997); Memphis, TN
01/28/2012; 7:00 pm		Tulane	W 88–74	12–10 (3–4)	Tudor Fieldhouse (1,424); Houston, TX
02/01/2012; 7:00 pm		UTEP	W 77–75	13–10 (4–4)	Tudor Fieldhouse (1,305); Houston, TX
02/04/2012; 5:00 pm		at East Carolina	L 68–82	13–11 (4–5)	Williams Arena at Minges Coliseum (5,212); Greenville, NC
02/08/2012; 7:00 pm, FSN		at Houston	W 79–71	14–11 (5–5)	Hofheinz Pavilion (5,220); Houston, TX
02/11/2012; 7:00 pm		SMU	W 43–39	15–11 (6–5)	Tudor Fieldhouse (1,363); Houston, TX
02/18/2012; 7:00 pm		at Tulsa	L 50–69	15–12 (6–6)	Reynolds Center (5,511); Tulsa, OK
02/22/2012; 8:00 pm, CSS		UCF	W 83–74	16–12 (7–6)	Tudor Fieldhouse (1,517); Houston, TX
02/25/2012; 7:00 pm, CSS		at Southern Miss	L 56–58	16–13 (7–7)	Reed Green Coliseum (3,965); Hattiesburg, MS
02/29/2012; 8:00 pm		at UTEP	W 68–61	17–13 (8–7)	Don Haskins Center (8,268); El Paso, TX
03/03/2012; 7:00 pm, CSS		Houston	L 75–76	17–14 (8–8)	Tudor Fieldhouse (1,943); Houston, TX
2012 Conference USA men's basketball tournament
03/07/2012; 12:00 pm, CSS		vs. East Carolina; First Round	L 66–68	17–15	FedExForum (8,356); Memphis, TN
2012 CIT
03/14/2012*; 7:00 pm		at Louisiana–Lafayette; First Round	W 68–63	18–15	Cajundome (2,037); Lafayette, LA
03/17/2012*; 7:00 pm		Drake; Second Round	W 74–68	19–15	Tudor Fieldhouse (731); Houston, TX
03/20/2012*; 6:00 pm		at Oakland; Quarterfinals	L 70–77	19–16	Athletics Center O'rena (1,775); Rochester, MI
*Non-conference game. ^{#}Rankings from AP Poll. (#) Tournament seedings in parentheses. All times are in Central Time.
