= 2011–12 Memphis Tigers men's basketball team =

American college basketball season

2011–12 Memphis Tigers men's basketball

C-USA Regular Season & tournament champions

NCAA tournament, Round of 64
- Conference: Conference USA
- Record: 26–9 (13–3 C-USA)
- Head coach: Josh Pastner (3rd year)
- Assistant coaches: Damon Stoudamire; Jack Murphy; Luke Walton /Jimmy Williams
- Home arena: FedExForum

2011–12 Conference USA men's basketball standings
	Conf.				Overall
Team	W		L	PCT	W		L	PCT
Memphis†	13	–	3	.813	26	–	8	.765
Southern Miss	11	–	5	.688	25	–	9	.735
Tulsa	10	–	6	.625	17	–	14	.548
UCF	10	–	6	.625	22	–	11	.667
UAB	9	–	7	.563	15	–	16	.484
Marshall	9	–	7	.563	21	–	14	.600
Rice	8	–	8	.500	18	–	15	.545
UTEP	7	–	9	.438	15	–	17	.469
Houston	7	–	9	.438	15	–	15	.500
East Carolina	5	–	11	.313	15	–	16	.484
SMU	4	–	12	.250	13	–	19	.406
Tulane	3	–	13	.188	15	–	19	.441
† 2012 CUSA Tournament winner As of March 15, 2012; Rankings from AP Poll

The 2011–12 Memphis Tigers men's basketball team represented the University of Memphis in the 2011–12 college basketball season, the 91st season of Tiger basketball. The Tigers were coached by head coach Josh Pastner. Pastner was assisted by Jack Murphy and Damon Stoudamire. From the summer of 2011 until December 2011, NBA player Luke Walton was also an assistant coach, though he departed from the position with the end of the NBA lockout. Jimmy Williams was brought in to replace Walton for the remainder of the 2011–12 season. The Tigers played their home games at the FedExForum in Memphis, Tennessee and were members of Conference USA.

== Pre-season ==
The 2010–11 Memphis Tigers finished the season with a record of 25–10 (10–6 C-USA). The Tigers finished in fourth place in C-USA, but won the 2011 Conference USA men's basketball tournament to secure a berth in the 2011 NCAA Division I men's basketball tournament where they lost in the second round to Arizona.

=== Departures ===
Name	Number	Pos.	Height	Weight	Year	Hometown	Notes
Will Coleman	0	F	6' 9"	245	Senior	Columbus, Georgia	Only recruit from the original 2009–10 recruiting class to remain at Memphis.

Statistics accurate as of June 3, 2011.

=== Recruiting ===
College recruiting information
Name	Hometown	School	Height	Weight	Commit date
Stan Simpson; C	Carterville, IL	John A. Logan	6 ft 10 in (2.08 m)	235 lb (107 kg)	Apr 10, 2011
Stan Simpson; C	Recruit ratings: Scout: Rivals: (40)				
Adonis Thomas; SF	Memphis, TN	Melrose	6 ft 6 in (1.98 m)	198 lb (90 kg)	Oct 28, 2010
Adonis Thomas; SF	Recruit ratings: Scout: Rivals: (97)				
Overall recruit ranking:
Note: In many cases, Scout, Rivals, 247Sports, On3, and ESPN may conflict in their listings of height and weight.; In these cases, the average was taken. ESPN grades are on a 100-point scale.; Sources: "Memphis Basketball Commitments". Rivals.; "2011 Memphis Basketball Commits". Scout.; "ESPN". ESPN.; "Scout.com Team Recruiting Rankings". Scout.; "2011 Team Ranking". Rivals.

=== Transfers ===
Name	Pos.	Height	Weight	Year	Hometown	Notes
Ferrakohn Hall	F	6' 8"	220	Junior	Memphis, Tennessee	Transferred from Seton Hall University, eligible Dec. 17

== Season summary ==
The Tigers began the season ranked in the top 15 of the AP and Coaches polls and the consensus pre-season favorite to win the Conference USA championship. The Tigers had scheduled aggressively, with their out of conference schedule ranking as one of the toughest in the country among division 1 teams.

The Tigers, with a roster dominated by a large sophomore class and freshman blue chip recruit Adonis Thomas, struggled somewhat with their difficult out of conference schedule. Despite not taking any bad losses prior to the start of conference play, the Tigers did not defeat a ranked opponent during their non-conference slate. Sophomore Will Barton, however, quickly became a favorite to win CUSA player of the year honors, ranking in the top 50 in both rebounds per game and points per game in division 1 for the 2011–12 season.

On January 16, 2012, the Commercial Appeal reported that talented freshman Adonis Thomas would miss the remainder of the regular season due to ankle surgery. Senior guard and starter Charles Carmouche would also miss all but the first few games of the Tigers' season with knee problems. Thomas, however, returned to the court for the Tigers' first CUSA tournament game.

With a victory at Tulsa on March 3, the Tigers clinched the CUSA regular season championship. The Tigers finished the regular season with an overall record of 23 wins and 8 losses, and a conference record of 13 wins and 3 losses. On March 7, 2012, Will Barton was named Conference USA Player of the Year.

In the CUSA tournament, the Tigers defeated their three opponents by an average of 25 points and ultimately won the championship over Marshall on March 10 in Memphis. For the second consecutive year, Tigers' point guard Joe Jackson was named the tournament's most valuable player. Will Barton and Tarik Black were also named to the all-tournament team.

The Tigers received an 8 seed in the West Region of the 2012 NCAA tournament, a seed which was widely considered to be too low given the Tigers' resume. Memphis lost to 9 seed St. Louis in the second round on March 16, ending their season.

== Roster ==
2011–12 Memphis Tigers men's basketball team
Players
Coaches

Pos.	#	Name	Height	Weight	Year	Hometown
G	1	Joe Jackson	6 ft 0 in (1.83 m)	170 lb (77 kg)	So	Memphis, Tennessee
G	2	Antonio Barton	6 ft 2 in (1.88 m)	165 lb (75 kg)	So	Baltimore, Maryland
G	3	Chris Crawford	6 ft 4 in (1.93 m)	205 lb (93 kg)	So	Memphis, Tennessee
G	4	Charles Carmouche (injured)	6 ft 2 in (1.88 m)	175 lb (79 kg)	Sr	New Orleans, Louisiana
G	5	Will Barton	6 ft 6 in (1.98 m)	175 lb (79 kg)	So	Baltimore, Maryland
C	10	Tarik Black (C)	6 ft 8 in (2.03 m)	252 lb (114 kg)	So	Memphis, Tennessee
G/F	11	Wesley Witherspoon	6 ft 9 in (2.06 m)	210 lb (95 kg)	Sr	Atlanta, Georgia
G/F	12	Drew Barham (redshirt)	6 ft 7 in (2.01 m)	194 lb (88 kg)	Jr	Cordova, Tennessee
F	14	Hippolyte Tsafack	6 ft 8 in (2.03 m)	231 lb (105 kg)	RS Fr	Yaoundé, Cameroon
G	15	Trey Draper	5 ft 10 in (1.78 m)	170 lb (77 kg)	So	Memphis, Tennessee
G	20	Ferrakohn Hall	6 ft 8 in (2.03 m)	220 lb (100 kg)	Jr	Memphis, Tennessee
G	23	Charles Holt	5 ft 10 in (1.78 m)	175 lb (79 kg)	Jr	Jackson, Tennessee
G/F	30	D. J. Stephens	6 ft 5 in (1.96 m)	185 lb (84 kg)	Jr	Killeen, Texas
G	31	Preston Laird	6 ft 3 in (1.91 m)	189 lb (86 kg)	Sr	Memphis, Tennessee
C	32	Stan Simpson	6 ft 10 in (2.08 m)	235 lb (107 kg)	Jr	Carterville, Illinois
G/F	35	Adonis Thomas	6 ft 6 in (1.98 m)	198 lb (90 kg)	Fr	Memphis, Tennessee

Head coach

- Josh Pastner (Arizona)

Assistant coach(es)

- Jack Murphy (Arizona)
- Damon Stoudamire (Arizona)
- Luke Walton (Arizona)
- Jimmy Williams (Ashland)

Legend

- (C) Team captain
- (S) Suspended
- (I) Ineligible
- (W) Walk-on
- Injured
- Current redshirt

Roster
Last update: Feb 28, 2012

== Schedule ==
Date time, TV	Rank^{#}	Opponent^{#}	Result	Record	Site (attendance) city, state
Exhibition
Wed, Nov 2*; 7:00 pm	No. 11	LeMoyne-Owen	W 119–67		FedExForum; Memphis, TN
Fri, Nov 11*; 8:00 pm	No. 11	Christian Brothers	W 79–56		FedExForum; Memphis, TN
Regular Season
Tue, Nov 15*; 11:00 am, ESPN	No. 10	Belmont; Maui Invitational Tournament opening round	W 97–81	1–0	FedExForum (16,294); Memphis, TN
Mon, Nov 21*; 2:00 pm, ESPN2	No. 8	vs. No. 15 Michigan; Maui Invitational Tournament quarterfinals	L 61–73	1–1	Lahaina Civic Center (2,400); Maui, HI
Tue, Nov 22*; 1:00 pm, ESPN2	No. 8	vs. Tennessee; Maui Invitational Tournament loser bracket	W 99–97 ^{2OT}	2–1	Lahaina Civic Center (2,400); Maui, HI
Wed, Nov 23*; 4:00 pm, ESPN2	No. 8	vs. Georgetown; Maui Invitational Tournament 5th place game	L 88–91 ^{OT}	2–2	Lahaina Civic Center (2,400); Maui, HI
Mon, Nov 28*; 7:00 pm, SPSO	No. 22	Jackson State	W 70–45	3–2	FedExForum (15,971); Memphis, TN
Sat, Dec 3*; 7:30 pm, CSS	No. 22	Austin Peay	W 91–60	4–2	FedExForum (16,989); Memphis, TN
Tue, Dec 6*; 8:00 pm, ESPN2	No. 21	at Miami (FL)	W 71–54	5–2	BankUnited Center (4,500); Coral Gables, FL
Sat, Dec 10*; 5:00 pm, CSS	No. 21	Murray State	L 72–76	5–3	FedExForum (16,795); Memphis, TN
Sat, Dec 17*; 3:00 pm, CBS		at No. 4 Louisville; Hall of Fame Shootout	L 87–95	5–4	KFC Yum! Center (22,733); Louisville, KY
Mon, Dec 19*; 6:00 pm, CSS		Lipscomb	W 85–75	6–4	FedExForum (16,162); Memphis, TN
Thu, Dec 22*; 6:00 pm, ESPN2		at No. 16 Georgetown	L 59–70	6–5	Verizon Center (12,045); Washington, DC
Thu, Dec 29*; 6:00 pm, CSS		Robert Morris	W 64–47	7–5	FedExForum (16,436); Memphis, TN
Sat, Dec 31*; 8:00 pm, CSS		Charlotte	W 67–58	8–5	FedExForum (16,069); Memphis, TN
Wed, Jan 4*; 7:00 pm, FSTN		Tennessee	W 69–51	9–5	FedExForum (18,334); Memphis, TN
Sat, Jan 7; 8:00 pm, CBSSN		at UAB	W 62–59	10–5 (1–0)	Bartow Arena (8,242); Birmingham, AL
Wed, Jan 11; 6:00 pm, CSS		Southern Miss	W 60–58	11–5 (2–0)	FedExForum (16,246); Memphis, TN
Sat, Jan 14; 8:00 pm, CBSSN		at Houston	W 89–55	12–5 (3–0)	Hofheinz Pavilion (5,146); Houston, TX
Wed, Jan 18; 7:00 pm, CBSSN		at UCF	L 67–68	12–6 (3–1)	UCF Arena (8,734); Orlando, FL
Sat, Jan 21; 12:00 pm, SPSO		SMU	W 63–45	13–6 (4–1)	FedExForum (16,721); Memphis, TN
Wed, Jan 25; 7:00 pm, SPSO		Rice	W 73–51	14–6 (5–1)	FedExForum (15,997); Memphis, TN
Sat, Jan 28; 8:00 pm, CSS		Marshall	W 83–76	15–6 (6–1)	FedExForum (17,337); Memphis, TN
Wed, Feb 1; 7:00 pm, CBSSN		at Southern Miss	L 72–75	15–7 (6–2)	Reed Green Coliseum (7,964); Hattiesburg, MS
Sat, Feb 4*; 12:00 pm, SPSO		Xavier	W 72–68	16–7	FedExForum (17,097); Memphis, TN
Wed, Feb 8; 6:00 pm, CSS		at East Carolina	W 70–59	17–7 (7–2)	Williams Arena at Minges Coliseum (5,460); Greenville, NC
Sat, Feb 11; 7:00 pm, CSS		UAB	W 79–45	18–7 (8–2)	FedExForum (17,308); Memphis, TN
Wed, Feb 15; 7:00 pm		at Tulane	W 82–64	19–7 (9–2)	Avron B. Fogelman Arena (2,874); New Orleans, LA
Sat, Feb 18; 1:00 pm, SPSO		UTEP	L 58–60	19–8 (9–3)	FedExForum (16,427); Memphis, TN
Wed, Feb 22; 7:00 pm, CBSSN		East Carolina	W 70–47	20–8 (10–3)	FedExForum (15,744); Memphis, TN
Sat, Feb 25; 3:00 pm, SPSO		at Marshall	W 87–67	21–8 (11–3)	Cam Henderson Center (8,252); Huntington, WV
Tue, Feb 28; 8:00 pm, CSS		UCF	W 84–55	22–8 (12–3)	FedExForum (17,784); Memphis, TN
Sat, Mar 3; 11:00 am, CBS		at Tulsa	W 78–66	23–8 (13–3)	Reynolds Center (6,131); Tulsa, OK
2012 Conference USA tournament
Thu, Mar 8; 6:30 pm, CBSSN		UTEP; Quarterfinals	W 65–47	24–8	FedEx Forum (11,697); Memphis, TN
Fri, Mar 9; 5:30 pm, CBSSN		UCF; Semifinals	W 83–52	25–8	FedEx Forum (14,441); Memphis, TN
Sat, Mar 10; 10:30 am, CBS		Marshall; Final	W 83–57	26–8	FedEx Forum (14,821); Memphis, TN
2012 NCAA tournament
Fri, Mar 16*; 5:50 pm, TBS		vs. Saint Louis; Second round	L 54–61	26–9	Nationwide Arena (17,464); Columbus, Ohio
*Non-conference game. ^{#}Rankings from AP Poll. (#) Tournament seedings in parentheses. All times are in Central Time.

== Rankings ==
Ranking movement Legend: ██ Increase in ranking. ██ Decrease in ranking. (rv) Received votes but unranked.
Poll	Pre	Wk 1	Wk 2	Wk 3	Wk 4	Wk 5	Wk 6	Wk 7	Wk 8	Wk 9	Wk 10	Wk 11	Wk 12	Wk 13	Wk 14	Wk 15	Wk 16	Wk 17	Wk 18	Final
AP	11	10	8	22	21	(rv)	(rv)	–	–	–	–	–	–	–	–	(rv)	–	(rv)	(rv)	
Coaches	9	10	8	21	20	(rv)	(rv)	–	–	–	–	–	–	–	–	–	–	(rv)	(rv)	
