= 2012 Conference USA men's basketball tournament =

- Tournament logo
- Classification: Division I
- Season: 2011–12
- Teams: 12
- Site: FedExForum; Memphis, Tennessee
- Champions: Memphis (6th title)
- Winning coach: Josh Pastner (2nd title)
- MVP: Joe Jackson (Memphis)
- Television: CBS Sports Network; CBS; CSS

2011–12 Conference USA men's basketball standings
	Conf.				Overall
Team	W		L	PCT	W		L	PCT
Memphis†	13	–	3	.813	26	–	8	.765
Southern Miss	11	–	5	.688	25	–	9	.735
Tulsa	10	–	6	.625	17	–	14	.548
UCF	10	–	6	.625	22	–	11	.667
UAB	9	–	7	.563	15	–	16	.484
Marshall	9	–	7	.563	21	–	14	.600
Rice	8	–	8	.500	18	–	15	.545
UTEP	7	–	9	.438	15	–	17	.469
Houston	7	–	9	.438	15	–	15	.500
East Carolina	5	–	11	.313	15	–	16	.484
SMU	4	–	12	.250	13	–	19	.406
Tulane	3	–	13	.188	15	–	19	.441
† 2012 CUSA Tournament winner As of March 15, 2012; Rankings from AP Poll

The 2012 Conference USA Men's Basketball Tournament was held from March 7–10, 2012 at the FedExForum in Memphis, Tennessee.

Seeding for the tournament was determined by the conference standings at the end of the regular season. The winner of the tournament, Memphis, received the Conference USA automatic bid into the 2012 NCAA tournament.

== Bracket ==
First round March 7 CSS
8	UTEP	67^{OT}
9	Houston	62
5	UAB	72
12	Tulane	64
7	Rice	66
10	East Carolina	68
6	Marshall	74
11	SMU	56

Quarterfinals; March 8, 2012; CBS Sports Network
1	Memphis	65
8	UTEP	47
4	UCF	64
5	UAB	54
2	Southern Miss	81^{OT}
10	East Carolina	78
3	Tulsa	100
6	Marshall	105^{3OT}

Semifinals; March 9, 2012; CBS Sports Network
1	Memphis	83
4	UCF	52
2	Southern Miss	62
6	Marshall	73

Championship Game; March 10, 2012; CBS
1	Memphis	83
6	Marshall	57
