= 2011–12 UCF Knights men's basketball team =

American college basketball season

2011–12 UCF Knights men's basketball

UCF Holiday Classic Champions

NIT First Round vs. Drexel, L 56–81
- Conference: Conference USA
- Record: 22–11 (10–6 C-USA)
- Head coach: Donnie Jones
- Assistant coaches: Shawn Finney; Darren Tillis; Tim Thomas
- Home arena: UCF Arena

2011–12 Conference USA men's basketball standings
	Conf.				Overall
Team	W		L	PCT	W		L	PCT
Memphis†	13	–	3	.813	26	–	8	.765
Southern Miss	11	–	5	.688	25	–	9	.735
Tulsa	10	–	6	.625	17	–	14	.548
UCF	10	–	6	.625	22	–	11	.667
UAB	9	–	7	.563	15	–	16	.484
Marshall	9	–	7	.563	21	–	14	.600
Rice	8	–	8	.500	18	–	15	.545
UTEP	7	–	9	.438	15	–	17	.469
Houston	7	–	9	.438	15	–	15	.500
East Carolina	5	–	11	.313	15	–	16	.484
SMU	4	–	12	.250	13	–	19	.406
Tulane	3	–	13	.188	15	–	19	.441
† 2012 CUSA Tournament winner As of March 15, 2012; Rankings from AP Poll

The 2011–12 UCF Knights men's basketball team was an NCAA Division I college basketball team that represented the University of Central Florida and competes in Conference USA. They played their home games at UCF Arena in Orlando, Florida, and were led by second-year head coach Donnie Jones.

== Previous season ==
In the previous year, the Knights finished the season 21–12, 6–10 in C-USA play under the leadership of then first-year Head Coach Donnie Jones. The year was full of milestones for the UCF program. Following a 10–0 start to the season, in which they defeated #18 Florida, South Florida, and Miami, the Knights were nationally ranked for the first time in program history. At the time, UCF was one of only four schools to be ranked in the BCS standings and the AP men's basketball poll.

The Knights started the season on a 14–0 run before an eight-game skid that dropped them out of the national rankings. UCF was invited to the 2011 College Basketball Invitational, where they beat St. Bonaventure in the first round and Rhode Island in the quarterfinals before falling to Creighton in the semifinals.

All of UCF's wins from the 2010–11 season were later vacated.

== Pre-season ==
=== Departures ===
Name	Number	Pos.	Height	Weight	Year	Hometown	Reason for departure
Jarvis Davis	2	G	6'1"	175	Freshman	Columbia, South Carolina	Transferred
David Diakite	15	F	6'6"	215	RS sophomore	Washington, D.C.	Transferred
Tom Herzog	41	C	7'0"	250	RS senior	Flint, Michigan	Graduated
Isaac Sosa	11	G	6'3"	190	Junior	Guaynabo, Puerto Rico	Transferred
A.J. Tyler	25	F	6'9"	225	RS senior	Palm Harbor, Florida	Graduated
Taylor Young	12	G	6'1"	185	RS senior	Orlando, Florida	Graduated

=== Class of 2011 signees ===
College recruiting
Name	Hometown	School	Height	Weight	Commit date
Rod Days; SF	Weston, FL	The Sagemont School	6 ft 6 in (1.98 m)	195 lb (88 kg)	Aug 2, 2010
Rod Days; SF	Recruit ratings: Scout: Rivals: (89)				
Wayne Martin; PF	Jacksonville, FL	Providence School	6 ft 7 in (2.01 m)	200 lb (91 kg)	Sep 11, 2010
Wayne Martin; PF	Recruit ratings: Scout: Rivals: (89)				
Kasey Wilson; PF	North Port, FL	North Port High School	6 ft 7 in (2.01 m)	205 lb (93 kg)	Aug 2, 2010
Kasey Wilson; PF	Recruit ratings: Scout: Rivals: (90)				
Overall recruit ranking:
Note: In many cases, Scout, Rivals, 247Sports, On3, and ESPN may conflict in their listings of height and weight.; In these cases, the average was taken. ESPN grades are on a 100-point scale.; Sources: "UCF Basketball Commitments". Rivals.; "2011 UCF Basketball Commits". Scout.; "ESPN". ESPN.; "Scout.com Team Recruiting Rankings". Scout.; "2011 Team Ranking". Rivals.

== Roster ==
2011–12 UCF Knights men's basketball team
Players
Coaches

Pos.	#	Name	Height	Weight	Year	Hometown
F	33	Keith Clanton	6 ft 9 in (2.06 m)	245 lb (111 kg)	Jr	Orlando, FL
F	24	Josh Crittle	6 ft 9 in (2.06 m)	260 lb (118 kg)	RS Jr	Bellwood, IL
G/F	0	Rod Days	6 ft 6 in (1.98 m)	195 lb (88 kg)	Fr	Miami Gardens, FL
F	21	P. J. Gaynor	6 ft 8 in (2.03 m)	210 lb (95 kg)	Sr	Jacksonville, FL
G	11	Bobby Horodyski	6 ft 0 in (1.83 m)	175 lb (79 kg)	Jr	Gainesville, FL
G	13	Jeffrey Jordan	6 ft 1 in (1.85 m)	175 lb (79 kg)	RS Sr	Chicago, IL
G	5	Marcus Jordan	6 ft 3 in (1.91 m)	205 lb (93 kg)	Jr	Chicago, IL
F	2	Wayne Martin	6 ft 7 in (2.01 m)	200 lb (91 kg)	Fr	Jacksonville, FL
F/C	10	Dwight McCombs (S)	6 ft 8 in (2.03 m)	250 lb (113 kg)	Sr	Chicago, IL
G	12	C. J. Reed	6 ft 3 in (1.91 m)	175 lb (79 kg)	Sr	Daytona Beach, FL
G	3	A. J. Rompza	5 ft 9 in (1.75 m)	160 lb (73 kg)	Sr	Chicago, IL
F	1	Tristan Spurlock	6 ft 8 in (2.03 m)	230 lb (104 kg)	RS So	Woodbridge, VA
G/F	32	Isaiah Sykes	6 ft 5 in (1.96 m)	205 lb (93 kg)	So	Detroit, MI
F	22	Kasey Wilson	6 ft 7 in (2.01 m)	205 lb (93 kg)	Fr	North Port, FL

Head coach

- Donnie Jones (Pikeville)

Assistant coach(es)

- Shawn Finney (Fairmont)
- Darren Tillis (Paul Quinn)
- Tim Thomas (Wheeling Jesuit)

Legend

- (C) Team captain
- (S) Suspended
- (I) Ineligible
- (W) Walk-on
- Injured
- Current redshirt

Roster
Last update: November 4, 2011

== Schedule and results ==
Date time, TV	Rank^{#}	Opponent^{#}	Result	Record	Site (attendance) city, state
Exhibition
11/05/2011*; 5:00 pm		West Virginia Tech	W 81–66	–	UCF Arena (N/A); Orlando, FL
Regular season
11/12/2011*; 5:00 pm		St. Thomas	W 74–61	1–0	UCF Arena (4,106); Orlando, FL
11/14/2011*; 7:00 pm, ESPN3		at No. 25 Florida State	L 50–73	1–1	Donald L. Tucker Center (7,655); Tallahassee, FL
11/18/2011*; 7:00 pm		High Point	W 84–72	2–1	UCF Arena (5,293); Orlando, FL
11/24/2011*; 2:00 pm, Versus		vs. College of Charleston; Battle 4 Atlantis Quarterfinals	W 74–63	3–1	Imperial Arena (1,493); Nassau, BAH
11/25/2011*; 2:00 pm, Versus		vs. No. 4 Connecticut; Battle 4 Atlantis Semifinals	W 68–63	4–1	Imperial Arena (2,394); Nassau, BAH
11/26/2011*; 4:30 pm, Versus		vs. Harvard; Battle 4 Atlantis Championship	L 49–59	4–2	Imperial Arena (2,752); Nassau, BAH
12/03/2011*; 5:00 pm		Hartford	W 67–48	5–2	UCF Arena (4,914); Orlando, FL
12/10/2011*; 5:00 pm, BHSN		Bethune-Cookman	W 53–51	6–2	UCF Arena (4,723); Orlando, FL
12/13/2011*; 7:00 pm		North Carolina A&T	W 77–65	7–2	UCF Arena (4,300); Orlando, FL
12/17/2011*; 5:00 pm		Old Dominion	W 61–53	8–2	UCF Arena (4,621); Orlando, FL
12/21/2011*; 8:00 pm		at Louisiana-Lafayette	L 60–61	8–3	Cajundome (3,132); Lafayette, LA
12/29/2011*; 7:00 pm		Stetson; UCF Holiday Classic Semifinals	W 80–70	9–3	UCF Arena (4,894); Orlando, FL
12/30/2011*; 7:00 pm		Rhode Island; UCF Holiday Classic Championship	W 65–54	10–3	UCF Arena (5,230); Orlando, FL
01/04/2012; 7:00 pm, BHSN		Tulane	W 60–53	11–3 (1–0)	UCF Arena (4,495); Orlando, FL
01/07/2012; 5:00 pm		at East Carolina	W 81–63	12–3 (2–0)	Williams Arena at Minges Coliseum (6,095); Greenville, NC
01/11/2012; 7:00 pm, BHSN		Houston	W 74–63	13–3 (3–0)	UCF Arena (7,862); Orlando, FL
01/14/2012; 7:00 pm		at Marshall	L 64–65	13–4 (3–1)	Cam Henderson Center (8,379); Huntington, WV
01/18/2012; 8:00 pm, CBSSN		Memphis	W 68–67	14–4 (4–1)	UCF Arena (8,734); Orlando, FL
01/21/2012; 2:00 pm, FSN		at UAB	W 48–41	15–4 (5–1)	Bartow Arena (4,476); Birmingham, AL
01/25/2012; 2:00 pm, CBSSN		at Tulsa	L 61–66	15–5 (5–2)	Reynolds Center (4,381); Tulsa, OK
01/28/2012; 7:00 pm, BHSN		Southern Miss	L 65–78	15–6 (5–3)	UCF Arena (7,790); Orlando, FL
01/30/2012*; 7:00 pm		Palm Beach Atlantic	W 84–69	16–6	UCF Arena (4,529); Orlando, FL
02/04/2012; 3:00 pm		at SMU	W 59–52	17–6 (6–3)	Moody Coliseum (2,065); University Park, TX
02/08/2012; 7:00 pm, BHSN		Marshall	W 67–60	18–6 (7–3)	UCF Arena (6,192); Orlando, FL
02/11/2012; 5:00 pm		at Southern Miss	L 74–78	18–7 (7–4)	Reed Green Coliseum (4,482); Hattiesburg, MS
02/18/2012; 7:00 pm, BHSN		East Carolina	W 64–55	19–7 (8–4)	UCF Arena (7,025); Orlando, FL
02/22/2012; 9:00 pm, CSS		at Rice	L 74–83	19–8 (8–5)	Tudor Fieldhouse (1,517); Houston, TX
02/25/2012; 8:00 pm, CBSSN		UTEP	W 63–45	20–8 (9–5)	UCF Arena (6,306); Orlando, FL
02/28/2012; 9:00 pm, CSS		at Memphis	L 55–84	20–9 (9–6)	FedExForum (17,784); Memphis, TN
03/03/2012; 7:00 pm		UAB	W 71–63	21–9 (10–6)	UCF Arena (6,283); Orlando, FL
2012 Conference USA tournament
03/08/2012; 10:00 pm, CBSSN		vs. UAB; Quarterfinals	W 64–54	22–9	FedEx Forum (11,697); Memphis, TN
03/09/2012; 6:30 pm, CBSSN		vs. Memphis; Semifinals	L 52–83	22–10	FedEx Forum (14,441); Memphis, TN
2012 National Invitation Tournament
03/14/2012; 7:15 pm, ESPN3		at Drexel; First Round	L 56–81	22–11	Daskalakis Athletic Center (1,821); Philadelphia, PA
*Non-conference game. ^{#}Rankings from AP Poll. (#) Tournament seedings in parentheses. All times are in Eastern Time.

== Rankings ==
Ranking movement Legend: ██ Increase in ranking. ██ Decrease in ranking. ██Not ranked the previous week.
Poll	Pre	Wk 1	Wk 2	Wk 3	Wk 4	Wk 5	Wk 6	Wk 7	Wk 8	Wk 9	Wk 10	Wk 11	Wk 12	Wk 13	Wk 14	Wk 15	Wk 16	Wk 17	Wk 18	Wk 19	Final
AP	—	—	—	—	—	—	—	—	—	—	—	—	—	—	—	—	—	—	—	—	—
Coaches	—	—	—	—	—	—	—	—	—	—	—	RV	—	—	—	—	—	—	—	—	—
