= 2012 Atlantic Sun men's basketball tournament =

- Classification: Division I
- Season: 2011–12
- Teams: 8
- Site: University Center; Macon, Georgia
- Champions: Belmont (5th title)
- Winning coach: Rick Byrd (5th title)
- MVP: Kerron Johnson (Belmont)

2011–12 Atlantic Sun men's basketball standings
	Conf.				Overall
Team	W		L	PCT	W		L	PCT
Belmont†	16	–	2	.889	27	–	8	.771
Mercer	13	–	5	.722	27	–	11	.711
USC Upstate	13	–	5	.722	21	–	13	.618
East Tennessee State	10	–	8	.556	17	–	14	.548
North Florida	10	–	8	.556	16	–	16	.500
Florida Gulf Coast	8	–	10	.444	15	–	17	.469
Lipscomb	8	–	10	.444	13	–	18	.419
Jacksonville	6	–	12	.333	8	–	22	.267
Stetson	6	–	12	.333	9	–	20	.310
Kennesaw State	0	–	18	.000	3	–	28	.097
† 2012 Atlantic Sun Tournament winner As of March 28, 2012; Rankings from AP Poll

The 2012 Atlantic Sun men's basketball tournament took place from February 29 – March 3, 2012 at University Center in Macon, Georgia. Belmont, in its final year in the A-Sun before moving to the Ohio Valley Conference, won the tournament and with it an automatic bid to the NCAA tournament.

== Format ==
The A-Sun Championship was a four-day single-elimination tournament. Eight teams competed in the championship and the participants were determined by conference winning percentage. The winner of the tournament earned the A-Sun's automatic bid into the 2012 NCAA tournament.

== Bracket ==
Quarterfinals; February 29, March 1
1	Belmont	76
8	Jacksonville	62
4	East Tennessee State	68
5	North Florida	66
3	USC Upstate	61
6	Florida Gulf Coast	71
2	Mercer	61
7	Lipscomb	53

Semifinals; March 2
1	Belmont	69
4	East Tennessee State	61
6	Florida Gulf Coast	62
2	Mercer	58

Championship Game; March 3
1	Belmont	83
6	Florida Gulf Coast	69

== See also ==
- 2011-12 NCAA Division I men's basketball season
- Atlantic Sun men's basketball tournament
