= 2011–12 Belmont Bruins men's basketball team =

American college basketball season

2011–12 Belmont Bruins men's basketball

Atlantic Sun regular season and tournament champions

NCAA tournament, Round of 64
- Conference: Atlantic Sun Conference
- Record: 27–8 (16–2 A-Sun)
- Head coach: Rick Byrd (26th season)
- Assistant coaches: Brian Ayers; James Strong; Mark Price
- Home arena: Curb Event Center

2011–12 Atlantic Sun men's basketball standings
	Conf.				Overall
Team	W		L	PCT	W		L	PCT
Belmont†	16	–	2	.889	27	–	8	.771
Mercer	13	–	5	.722	27	–	11	.711
USC Upstate	13	–	5	.722	21	–	13	.618
East Tennessee State	10	–	8	.556	17	–	14	.548
North Florida	10	–	8	.556	16	–	16	.500
Florida Gulf Coast	8	–	10	.444	15	–	17	.469
Lipscomb	8	–	10	.444	13	–	18	.419
Jacksonville	6	–	12	.333	8	–	22	.267
Stetson	6	–	12	.333	9	–	20	.310
Kennesaw State	0	–	18	.000	3	–	28	.097
† 2012 Atlantic Sun Tournament winner As of March 28, 2012; Rankings from AP Poll

The 2011–12 Belmont Bruins men's basketball team represented Belmont University during the 2011–12 NCAA Division I men's basketball season. The Bruins, led by 26th-year head coach Rick Byrd, played their home games at Curb Event Center and were in their final season as members of the Atlantic Sun Conference. Belmont became a member of the Ohio Valley Conference on July 1, 2012.

The Bruins finished the season 27–8, 16–2 to be crowned Atlantic Sun regular season champions. They were also champions of the Atlantic Sun Basketball tournament to earn the conference's automatic bid into the 2012 NCAA tournament, where they lost in the second round to Georgetown.

== Roster ==
Number	Name	Position	Height	Weight	Year	Hometown
0	Chad Lang	Center	6–11	275	Freshman	Marietta, Georgia
1	Drew Hanlen	Guard	5–11	180	Senior	St. Louis, Missouri
2	Blake Jenkins	Forward	6–7	205	Sophomore	Knoxville, Tennessee
3	Kerron Johnson	Guard	6–1	175	Junior	Huntsville, Alabama
4	Holden Mobley	Guard/forward	6–3	200	Freshman	Nashville, Tennessee
5	Seth Cavera	Guard	6–2	195	Freshman	Colorado Springs, Colorado
11	Spencer Turner	Guard	6–3	185	Freshman	Bloomington, Indiana
14	J. J. Mann	Guard/forward	6–6	210	Sophomore	Smyrna, Georgia
21	Ian Clark	Guard	6–3	175	Junior	Memphis, Tennessee
22	Reece Chamberlain	Guard	6–1	175	Freshman	Goodlettsville, Tennessee
24	Adam Barnes	Guard	6–2	190	Junior	Clarksville, Tennessee
30	Trevor Noack	Forward	6–7	240	Junior	Keller, Texas
32	Scott Saunders	Forward/center	6–10	250	Senior	New Orleans, Louisiana
34	Mick Hedgepeth	Forward/center	6–9	235	Senior	Crossville, Alabama
45	Brandon Baker	Forward	6–6	220	Junior	Milford, Ohio

== Schedule ==
Date time, TV	Rank^{#}	Opponent^{#}	Result	Record	Site (attendance) city, state
Regular season
11/11/2011*; 8:00 pm, ESPNU		at No. 6 Duke; Maui Invitational Opening Round	L 76–77	0–1	Cameron Indoor Stadium (9,314); Durham, NC
11/15/2011*; 11:00 am, ESPN		at No. 10 Memphis; Maui Invitational Opening Round/ESPN College Tip-Off Marathon	L 81–97	0–2	FedExForum (16,294); Memphis, TN
11/19/2011*; 2:30 pm		vs. Towson; Maui Invitational Regional	W 87–41	1–2	Murphy Center (5,411); Murfreesboro, TN
11/20/2011*; 3:30 pm		at Middle Tennessee; Maui Invitational Regional	W 87–84 ^{2OT}	2–2	Murphy Center (4,762); Murfreesboro, TN
11/28/2011*; 7:00 pm		Trevecca Nazarene	W 86–61	3–2	Curb Event Center (2,004); Nashville, TN
12/01/2011; 7:15 pm		Kennesaw State	W 98–52	4–2 (1–0)	Curb Event Center (1,460); Nashville, TN
12/03/2011; 4:15 pm		Mercer	W 82–78	5–2 (2–0)	Curb Event Center (1,640); Nashville, TN
12/06/2011*; 7:00 pm		Tennessee State	W 75–62	6–2	Curb Event Center (1,403); Nashville, TN
12/13/2011*; 7:00 pm, ESPN3		at Middle Tennessee	L 62–65	6–3	Murphy Center (6,095); Murfreesboro, TN
12/15/2011*; 7:00 pm		Troy	W 78–55	7–3	Curb Event Center (1,068); Nashville, TN
12/17/2011*; 3:30 pm		at Miami (OH)	W 66–61	7–4	Millett Hall (1,324); Oxford, OH
12/19/2011*; 6:00 pm		at Marshall	W 87–86	7–5	Cam Henderson Center (5,759); Huntington, WV
12/21/2011*; 7:30 pm		at Austin Peay	W 77–67	8–5	Dunn Center (3,212); Clarksville, TN
12/29/2011*; 7:00 pm		Marshall	W 79–74	9–5	Curb Event Center (2,007); Nashville, TN
01/02/2012; 6:45 pm		at North Florida	W 83–53	10–5 (3–0)	UNF Arena (1,002); Jacksonville, FL
01/04/2012; 6:15 pm		at Jacksonville	W 75–63	11–5 (4–0)	Veterans Memorial Arena (1,105); Jacksonville, FL
01/06/2012; 7:00 pm		Lipscomb	L 74–85	11–6 (4–1)	Curb Event Center (5,227); Nashville, TN
01/14/2012; 7:15 pm		Stetson	W 84–71	12–6 (5–1)	Curb Event Center (2,130); Nashville, TN
01/16/2012; 7:00 pm		Florida Gulf Coast	W 95–53	13–6 (6–1)	Curb Event Center (1,005); Nashville, TN
01/21/2012; 1:00 pm		at USC Upstate	L 78–79	13–7 (6–2)	G. B. Hodge Center (781); Spartanburg, SC
01/23/2012; 6:00 pm		at East Tennessee State	W 82–70	14–7 (7–2)	ETSU/MSHA Athletic Center (3,965); Johnson City, TN
01/28/2012; 7:15 pm		Jacksonville	W 85–71	15–7 (8–2)	Curb Event Center (2,429); Nashville, TN
01/30/2012; 7:00 pm		North Florida	W 83–69	16–7 (9–2)	Curb Event Center (1,065); Nashville, TN
02/03/2012; 6:00 pm, CSS		at Lipscomb	W 84–58	17–7 (10–2)	Allen Arena (5,387); Nashville, TN
02/06/2012*; 7:00 pm		Austin Peay	W 94–55	18–7	Curb Event Center (1,476); Nashville, TN
02/11/2012; 4:15 pm		at Florida Gulf Coast	W 86–63	19–7 (11–2)	Alico Arena (2,100); Ft. Myers, FL
02/13/2012; 6:00 pm		at Stetson	W 106–93	20–7 (12–2)	Edmunds Center (1,975); DeLand, FL
02/18/2012; 7:15 pm		East Tennessee State	W 80–58	21–7 (13–2)	Curb Event Center (3,451); Nashville, TN
02/20/2012; 7:00 pm		USC Upstate	W 88–79	22–7 (14–2)	Curb Event Center (1,809); Nashville, TN
02/23/2012; 6:00 pm		at Kennesaw State	W 90–50	23–7 (15–2)	KSU Convocation Center (1,047); Kennesaw, GA
02/25/2012; 4:30 pm		at Mercer	W 62–61	24–7 (16–2)	University Center (NA); Macon, GA
2012 Atlantic Sun men's basketball tournament
02/29/2012; 2:30 pm, ESPN3		vs. Jacksonville; Quarterfinals	W 76–62	25–7	University Center (2,621); Macon, GA
03/02/2012; 6:00 pm, ESPN3		vs. East Tennessee State; Semifinals	W 69–61	26–7	University Center (3,497); Macon, GA
03/03/2012; 7:00 pm, ESPN2		vs. Florida Gulf Coast; Championship Game	W 83–69	27–7	University Center (1,121); Macon, GA
2012 NCAA tournament
03/16/2012*; 3:10 pm, truTV	No. (MW 14)	vs. No. 15 (MW 3) Georgetown; Second Round	L 59–74	27–8	Nationwide Arena (17,030); Columbus, OH
*Non-conference game. ^{#}Rankings from AP Poll. (#) Tournament seedings in parentheses. All times are in Eastern Time (#) during NCAA Tournament is seed with Region.
