= 2011–12 UAB Blazers men's basketball team =

American college basketball season

2011–12 UAB Blazers men's basketball
- Conference: Conference USA
- Record: 15–16 (9–7 C-USA)
- Head coach: Mike Davis (6th season)
- Assistant coaches: Donnie Marsh; Walt Fuller; Mike Jaskulski
- Home arena: Bartow Arena

2011–12 Conference USA men's basketball standings
| | Conf. | | | | Overall |
| Team | W | | L | PCT | W | | L | PCT |
|---|---|---|---|---|---|---|---|---|
| Memphis† | 13 | – | 3 | .813 | 26 | – | 8 | .765 |
| Southern Miss | 11 | – | 5 | .688 | 25 | – | 9 | .735 |
| Tulsa | 10 | – | 6 | .625 | 17 | – | 14 | .548 |
| UCF | 10 | – | 6 | .625 | 22 | – | 11 | .667 |
| UAB | 9 | – | 7 | .563 | 15 | – | 16 | .484 |
| Marshall | 9 | – | 7 | .563 | 21 | – | 14 | .600 |
| Rice | 8 | – | 8 | .500 | 18 | – | 15 | .545 |
| UTEP | 7 | – | 9 | .438 | 15 | – | 17 | .469 |
| Houston | 7 | – | 9 | .438 | 15 | – | 15 | .500 |
| East Carolina | 5 | – | 11 | .313 | 15 | – | 16 | .484 |
| SMU | 4 | – | 12 | .250 | 13 | – | 19 | .406 |
| Tulane | 3 | – | 13 | .188 | 15 | – | 19 | .441 |
† 2012 CUSA Tournament winner As of March 15, 2012; Rankings from AP Poll

The 2011–12 UAB Blazers men's basketball team represented the University of Alabama at Birmingham in the 2011–12 NCAA Division I men's basketball season. The Blazers' head coach, Mike Davis, was in his sixth season at UAB. The Blazers, who compete in Conference USA, played their home games at Bartow Arena.

== Incoming Players ==
| Name | Height | Weight (lbs.) | Position | Class | Hometown | Previous Team(s) |
|---|---|---|---|---|---|---|
| K.C. Whitaker | 6'5" | 185 | G | Fr. | Ashburn, VA, U.S. | Fishburne Academy, Flint Hill High School |
| Jekore Tyler | 6'3" | 185 | G | Jr. | Port Arthur, TX, U.S. | Lee College |
| Alexander Scotland-Williamson | 6'9" | 235 | F | Jr. | London, England | Lee College |
| Herb Harrison | 6'8" | 230 | F | Fr. | Cleveland, OH, U.S. | Covenant Christian Academy |

== Roster ==
| # | Name | Height | Weight (lbs.) | Position | Class | Hometown | Previous Team(s) |
|---|---|---|---|---|---|---|---|
| 5 | Robert Williams | 6'4" | 210 | G | So. | Greenville, MS, U.S. | Weston High School |
| 10 | Karl Moton | 5'11" | 195 | G | Jr. | Stone Mountain, GA, U.S. | Chamblee HS |
| 21 | Beas Hamga | 6'11" | 230 | C | Sr. | Douala, Cameroon | Weatherford (Texas) CC |
| 22 | Cameron Moore | 6'10" | 230 | F | Sr. | San Antonio, TX, U.S. | Roosevelt HS |
| 24 | Preston Purifoy | 6'5" | 215 | G | So. | Conway, AR, U.S. | Conway High School |
| 32 | Ovie Soko | 6'8" | 210 | F | Jr. | London, England, U.K. | Bethel HS |
| 25 | Quincy Taylor | 6'0" | 185 | G | So. | Wichita, KS, U.S. | Fishburne Academy, Wichita Collegiate High School |
| 44 | Jordan Swing | 6'6" | 200 | F | So. | Birmingham, AL, U.S. | Western Kentucky University, Vestavia Hills High School |

== Schedule ==
| Date time, TV | Rank^{#} | Opponent^{#} | Result | Record | Site (attendance) city, state |
Exhibition
| 11/03/2011*; 8:00 pm | | Florida Tech | W 75–67 | – | Bartow Arena; Birmingham, AL |
| 11/12/2011*; 7:00 pm | | Auburn-Montgomery | W 64–36 | – | Bartow Arena; Birmingham, AL |
Regular season
| 11/16/2011*; 7:00 pm | | Creighton | L 60–70 | 0–1 | Bartow Arena (4,417); Birmingham, AL |
| 11/20/2011*; 3:00 pm | | Murray State | L 55–62 | 0–2 | Bartow Arena (3,863); Birmingham, AL |
| 11/22/2011*; 7:00 pm | | Troy | W 71–59 | 1–2 | Bartow Arena (4,307); Birmingham, AL |
| 11/25/2011*; 7:05 pm | | at Wichita State | L 46–68 | 1–3 | Intrust Bank Arena (11,204); Wichita, KS |
| 11/27/2011*; 3:00 pm | | UT Martin | L 54–59 | 1–4 | Bartow Arena (3,854); Birmingham, AL |
| 11/30/2011*; 7:05 pm | | at South Alabama | L 47–55 | 1–5 | Mitchell Center (3,276); Mobile, AL |
| 12/03/2011*; 6:00 pm | | at Kent State | L 48–57 | 1–6 | M.A.C. Center (3,624); Kent, OH |
| 12/07/2011*; 7:00 pm | | Middle Tennessee | W 66–56 | 2–6 | Bartow Arena (4,576); Birmingham, AL |
| 12/20/2011*; 6:30 pm, ESPN3 | | at VCU | L 49–68 | 2–7 | Stuart C. Siegel Center (7,617); Richmond, VA |
| 12/22/2011*; 7:00 pm | | Jacksonville | W 70–65 | 3–7 | Bartow Arena (3,962); Birmingham, AL |
| 12/28/2011*; 6:00 pm | | at George Washington | W 56–49 | 4–7 | Smith Center (2,271); Washington, D.C. |
| 12/31/2011*; 2:00 pm | | Alabama A&M | W 92–58 | 5–7 | Bartow Arena (4,102); Birmingham, AL |
| 01/03/2012*; 6:00 pm, FSN | | at No. 13 Florida | L 61–79 | 5–8 | O'Connell Center (7,512); Gainesville, FL |
| 01/07/2012; 8:00 pm, CBSSN | | Memphis | L 59–62 | 5–9 (0–1) | Bartow Arena (8,242); Birmingham, AL |
| 01/11/2012; 7:00 pm | | Marshall | L 59–61 | 5–10 (0–2) | Bartow Arena (3,127); Birmingham, AL |
| 01/14/2012; 1:00 pm, FSN | | at Southern Miss | L 55–59 | 5–11 (0–3) | Reed Green Coliseum (3,111); Hattiesburg, MS |
| 01/18/2012; 7:00 pm | | at Rice | W 61–60 ^{OT} | 6–11 (1–3) | Tudor Fieldhouse (1,371); Houston, TX |
| 01/21/2012; 1:00 pm, FSN | | UCF | L 41–48 | 6–12 (1–4) | Bartow Arena (4,476); Birmingham, AL |
| 01/25/2012; 6:00 pm, CSS | | at Marshall | W 56–49 | 7–12 (2–4) | Cam Henderson Center (5,653); Huntington, WV |
| 01/28/2012; 7:00 pm | | East Carolina | L 66–73 | 7–13 (2–5) | Bartow Arena (4,023); Birmingham, AL |
| 02/01/2012; 8:00 pm, CSS | | Houston | W 80–69 | 8–13 (3–5) | Bartow Arena (3,491); Birmingham, AL |
| 02/04/2012; 8:00 pm | | at UTEP | W 61–60 | 9–13 (4–5) | Don Haskins Center (7,838); El Paso, TX |
| 02/08/2012; 7:00 pm | | Southern Miss | W 71–61 | 10–13 (5–5) | Bartow Arena (4,721); Birmingham, AL |
| 02/11/2012; 7:00 pm, CSS | | at Memphis | L 45–79 | 10–14 (5–6) | FedExForum (17,308); Memphis, TN |
| 02/15/2012; 7:00 pm | | at SMU | W 47–28 | 11–14 (6–6) | Moody Coliseum (1,582); Dallas, TX |
| 02/18/2012; 7:00 pm | | Tulane | W 81–73 | 12–14 (7–6) | Bartow Arena (6,122); Birmingham, AL |
| 02/25/2012; 4:00 pm | | at East Carolina | W 61–57 | 13–14 (8–6) | Williams Arena at Minges Coliseum (5,308); Greenville, NC |
| 02/29/2012; 7:00 pm, CBSSN | | Tulsa | W 68–64 | 14–14 (9–6) | Bartow Arena (5,176); Birmingham, AL |
| 03/03/2012; 6:00 pm | | at UCF | L 63–71 | 14–15 (9–7) | UCF Arena (6,283); Orlando, FL |
2012 Conference USA men's basketball tournament
| 03/07/2012; 9:00 pm, CSS | (5) | vs. (12) Tulane; First round | W 72–64 | 15–15 | FedExForum (7,824); Memphis, TN |
| 03/08/2012; 9:00 pm, CBSSN | (5) | vs. (4) UCF; Quarterfinals | L 54–64 | 15–16 | FedExForum (11,697); Memphis, TN |
*Non-conference game. ^{#}Rankings from AP Poll. (#) Tournament seedings in parentheses. All times are in Central Time.

== See also ==
- UAB Blazers men's basketball
