= 2011–12 Marshall Thundering Herd men's basketball team =

American college basketball season

2011–12 Marshall Thundering Herd men's basketball

NIT, First Round
- Conference: Conference USA
- Record: 21–14 (9–7 C-USA)
- Head coach: Tom Herrion (2nd season)
- Assistant coach: Jorge Fernandez; Mark Cline; Dino Presley
- Home arena: Cam Henderson Center

2011–12 Conference USA men's basketball standings
	Conf.				Overall
Team	W		L	PCT	W		L	PCT
Memphis†	13	–	3	.813	26	–	8	.765
Southern Miss	11	–	5	.688	25	–	9	.735
Tulsa	10	–	6	.625	17	–	14	.548
UCF	10	–	6	.625	22	–	11	.667
UAB	9	–	7	.563	15	–	16	.484
Marshall	9	–	7	.563	21	–	14	.600
Rice	8	–	8	.500	18	–	15	.545
UTEP	7	–	9	.438	15	–	17	.469
Houston	7	–	9	.438	15	–	15	.500
East Carolina	5	–	11	.313	15	–	16	.484
SMU	4	–	12	.250	13	–	19	.406
Tulane	3	–	13	.188	15	–	19	.441
† 2012 CUSA Tournament winner As of March 15, 2012; Rankings from AP Poll

The 2011–12 Marshall Thundering Herd men's basketball team represented Marshall University in the 2011–12 college basketball season as a member of Conference USA (C-USA). They played their home games at the Cam Henderson Center and were led by second year head coach Tom Herrion.

== Preseason ==
=== Recruiting ===
College recruiting information
Name	Hometown	School	Height	Weight	Commit date
Robert Goff; C	Hutchinson, Kansas	Hutchinson	6 ft 9 in (2.06 m)	230 lb (100 kg)	Mar 31, 2011
Robert Goff; C	Recruit ratings: Scout: Rivals: (JC)				
Devince Boykins; SG	Forest City, North Carolina	East Rutherford High School	6 ft 3 in (1.91 m)	200 lb (91 kg)	Dec 15, 2010
Devince Boykins; SG	Recruit ratings: Scout: Rivals: (86)				
Chris Martin; SG	Washington, D.C.	St. Patrick High School	6 ft 0 in (1.83 m)	180 lb (82 kg)	Apr 24, 2011
Chris Martin; SG	Recruit ratings: Scout: Rivals: (84)				
Jamir Hanner; PF	Philadelphia, Pennsylvania	Notre Dame Prep	6 ft 8 in (2.03 m)	200 lb (91 kg)	Dec 10, 2010
Jamir Hanner; PF	Recruit ratings: Scout: Rivals: (POST)				
Dennis Tinnon; PF	Kansas City, Kansas	Kansas City Kansas CC	6 ft 7 in (2.01 m)	215 lb (98 kg)	Nov 12, 2010
Dennis Tinnon; PF	Recruit ratings: Scout: Rivals: (JC)				
Isaiah Thomas; SF	Newark, New Jersey	Shabazz High School	6 ft 7 in (2.01 m)	190 lb (86 kg)	Apr 11, 2011
Isaiah Thomas; SF	Recruit ratings: Scout: Rivals: (86)				
Overall recruit ranking: Scout: NR Rivals: NR ESPN: NR
Note: In many cases, Scout, Rivals, 247Sports, On3, and ESPN may conflict in their listings of height and weight.; In these cases, the average was taken. ESPN grades are on a 100-point scale.; Sources: "2011 Team Ranking". Rivals.

== Roster ==
2011–12 Marshall Thundering Herd men's basketball team
Players
Coaches

Pos.	#	Name	Height	Weight	Year	Hometown
G	15	DeVince Boykins (redshirt)	6 ft 4 in (1.93 m)	205 lb (93 kg)	Fr	Forest City, North Carolina
G	21	Justin Coleman	6 ft 5 in (1.96 m)	225 lb (102 kg)	RS Fr	Richmond, Virginia
F	2	Robert Goff	6 ft 9 in (2.06 m)	240 lb (109 kg)	Jr	Indianapolis, Indiana
F	4	Jamir Hanner	6 ft 8 in (2.03 m)	210 lb (95 kg)	Fr	Philadelphia, Pennsylvania
G	23	Shaquille Johnson	6 ft 3 in (1.91 m)	205 lb (93 kg)	Sr	Jacksonville, Florida
C	50	JP Kambola	6 ft 9 in (2.06 m)	245 lb (111 kg)	RS Fr	Toronto, Ontario, Canada
G	24	DeAndre Kane	6 ft 4 in (1.93 m)	200 lb (91 kg)	RS So	Pittsburgh, Pennsylvania
G	0	Chris Martin	6 ft 0 in (1.83 m)	180 lb (82 kg)	Fr	Upper Marlboro, Maryland
C	34	Yous Mbao	7 ft 2 in (2.18 m)	235 lb (107 kg)	RS So	Rufisque, Senegal
F	10	Dago Pena	6 ft 6 in (1.98 m)	220 lb (100 kg)	Sr	Santo Domingo, Dominican Republic
G	3	Damier Pitts	5 ft 10 in (1.78 m)	165 lb (75 kg)	Sr	Charlotte, North Carolina
C	11	Nigel Spikes	6 ft 10 in (2.08 m)	237 lb (108 kg)	RS Jr	Fort Lauderdale, Florida
F	1	Dennis Tinnon	6 ft 8 in (2.03 m)	225 lb (102 kg)	Jr	Green Bay, Wisconsin

Head coach

- Tom Herrion (Merrimack)

Assistant coach(es)

- Mark Cline (Wake Forest)
- Jorge Fernandez (Stetson)
- Dino Presley (Kutztown)

Legend

- (C) Team captain
- (S) Suspended
- (I) Ineligible
- (W) Walk-on
- Injured
- Current redshirt

Roster
Last update: 2012-11-13

== Schedule ==
Date time, TV	Rank^{#}	Opponent^{#}	Result	Record	Site (attendance) city, state
Exhibition
November 1, 2011*; 7:00 pm		Northern Kentucky	W 65–55	0–0	Cam Henderson Center (6,070); Huntington, WV
Regular season
November 11, 2011*; 8:00 pm		Alabama State	W 67–49	1–0	Cam Henderson Center (6,009); Huntington, WV
November 13, 2011*; 4:00 pm		Jacksonville State	W 58–44	2–0	Cam Henderson Center (5,513); Huntington, WV
November 19, 2011*; 7:00 pm		Northwestern State	W 83–61	3–0	Cam Henderson Center (5,578); Huntington, WV
November 22, 2011*; 7:00 pm		at UNC Wilmington	W 69–64	4–0	Trask Coliseum (3,270); Wilmington, NC
November 25, 2011*; 7:00 pm, ESPN3		at Cincinnati	W 73–69 ^{OT}	5–0	Fifth Third Arena (7,021); Cincinnati, OH
November 30, 2011*; 7:00 pm		Ohio	L 78–80	5–1	Cam Henderson Center (7,061); Huntington, WV
December 6, 2011*; 7:00 pm, WSAZ		at No. 3 Syracuse	L 56–62	5–2	Carrier Dome (19,817); Syracuse, NY
December 11, 2011*; 2:30 pm		Iona	W 82–63	6–2	Cam Henderson Center (5,918); Huntington, WV
December 17, 2011*; 7:00 pm		High Point	W 79–59	7–2	Cam Henderson Center (5,564); Huntington, WV
December 19, 2011*; 7:00 pm		Belmont	W 87–86	8–2	Cam Henderson Center (5,759); Huntington, WV
December 21, 2011*; 7:00 pm		West Virginia Tech	W 99–80	9–2	Cam Henderson Center (5,572); Huntington, WV
December 29, 2011*; 8:00 pm		at Belmont	L 74–79	9–3	Curb Event Center (2,007); Nashville, TN
January 1, 2012*; 4:00 pm		Akron	L 51–67	9–4	Cam Henderson Center (6,063); Huntington, WV
January 4, 2012; 8:00 pm, CBSSN		UTEP	W 76–60	10–4 (1–0)	Cam Henderson Center (5,229); Huntington, WV
January 7, 2012; 8:00 pm		at Rice	W 63–61	11–4 (2–0)	Tudor Fieldhouse (1,237); Houston, TX
January 11, 2012; 8:00 pm		at UAB	W 61–59	12–4 (3–0)	Bartow Arena (3,127); Birmingham, AL
January 14, 2012; 7:00 pm		UCF	W 65–64	13–4 (4–0)	Cam Henderson Center (8,379); Huntington, WV
January 18, 2012*; 7:30 pm, WOWK		vs. West Virginia; Chesapeake Energy Capital Classic	L 62–78	13–5	Charleston Civic Center (12,684); Charleston, WV
January 21, 2012; 6:00 pm, CSS/WSAZ		at Southern Miss	L 63–67	13–6 (4–1)	Reed Green Coliseum (4,757); Hattiesburg, MS
January 25, 2012; 7:00 pm, CSS		UAB	L 49–56	13–7 (4–2)	Cam Henderson Center (5,653); Huntington, WV
January 28, 2012; 9:00 pm, CSS/WSAZ		at Memphis	L 76–83	13–8 (4–3)	FedEx Forum (17,337); Memphis, TN
February 1, 2012; 7:00 pm		Tulane	W 63–44	14–8 (5–3)	Cam Henderson Center (5,590); Huntington, WV
February 4, 2012; 8:00 pm		at Tulsa	L 70–79	14–9 (5–4)	Reynolds Center (4,751); Tulsa, OK
February 8, 2012; 7:00 pm		at UCF	L 60–67	14–10 (5–5)	UCF Arena (6,192); Orlando, Fl
February 11, 2012; 7:00 pm, WSAZ		East Carolina	W 78–68	15–10 (6–5)	Cam Henderson Center (6,447); Huntington, WV
February 18, 2012; 3:00 pm		at SMU	W 73–68	16–10 (7–5)	Moody Coliseum (2,110); University Park, TX
February 22, 2012; 7:00 pm		Houston	W 66–58	17–10 (8–5)	Cam Henderson Center (6,023); Huntington, WV
February 25, 2012; 4:00 pm, FSN		Memphis	L 67–87	17–11 (8–6)	Cam Henderson Center (8,252); Huntington, WV
February 29, 2012; 7:00 pm, WSAZ		at East Carolina	L 68–69 ^{OT}	17–12 (8–7)	Williams Arena (4,334); Greenville, NC
March 3, 2012; 7:00 pm, FSN		Southern Miss	W 79–75	18–12 (9–7)	Cam Henderson Center (5,947); Huntington, WV
2012 C-USA Basketball tournament
March 7, 2012; 3:30 pm, CSS	(6)	vs. (11) SMU; First Round	W 74–56	19–12	FedEx Forum (8,356); Memphis, TN
March 8, 2012; 3:50 pm, CBSSN	(6)	vs. (3) Tulsa; Quarterfinals	W 105–100 ^{3OT}	20–12	FedEx Forum (7,930); Memphis, TN
March 9, 2012; 4:00 pm, CBSSN	(6)	vs. (2) Southern Miss; Semifinals	W 73–62	21–12	FedEx Forum (14,441); Memphis, TN
March 10, 2012; 11:30 am, CBS	(6)	at (1) Memphis; Championship Game	L 57–83	21–13	FedEx Forum (14,821); Memphis, TN
2012 National Invitation Tournament
March 13, 2012; 9:15 pm, ESPN3	(5)	at (4) Middle Tennessee; First Round	L 78–86	21–14	Murphy Center (4,556); Murfreesboro, TN
*Non-conference game. ^{#}Rankings from AP poll. (#) Tournament seedings in parentheses. All times are in Eastern Time.
