= 2011–12 USC Upstate Spartans men's basketball team =

American college basketball season

2011–12 USC Upstate Spartans men's basketball

CIT, Second Round
- Conference: Atlantic Sun Conference
- Record: 21–13 (13–5 A-Sun)
- Head coach: Eddie Payne (10th season)
- Assistant coaches: Kyle Perry; Ryan Walker; Kente Hart
- Home arena: G. B. Hodge Center

2011–12 Atlantic Sun men's basketball standings
	Conf.				Overall
Team	W		L	PCT	W		L	PCT
Belmont†	16	–	2	.889	27	–	8	.771
Mercer	13	–	5	.722	27	–	11	.711
USC Upstate	13	–	5	.722	21	–	13	.618
East Tennessee State	10	–	8	.556	17	–	14	.548
North Florida	10	–	8	.556	16	–	16	.500
Florida Gulf Coast	8	–	10	.444	15	–	17	.469
Lipscomb	8	–	10	.444	13	–	18	.419
Jacksonville	6	–	12	.333	8	–	22	.267
Stetson	6	–	12	.333	9	–	20	.310
Kennesaw State	0	–	18	.000	3	–	28	.097
† 2012 Atlantic Sun Tournament winner As of March 28, 2012; Rankings from AP Poll

The 2011–12 USC Spartans men's basketball team represented the University of South Carolina Upstate during the 2011–12 NCAA Division I men's basketball season. The Spartans, led by tenth year head coach Eddie Payne, played their home games at the G. B. Hodge Center and are members of the Atlantic Sun Conference.

For the first time, the Spartans were eligible for the Atlantic Sun Basketball tournament and NCAA postseason play, having completed their transition process to Division I.

They finished the season 21–13, 13–5 in A-Sun play to finish in a tie for second place. They lost in the quarterfinals of the Atlantic Sun Basketball Tournament to Florida Gulf Coast. They were invited to the 2012 CollegeInsider.com Tournament, their first ever Division I postseason appearance, where they defeated Kent State in the first round before falling to Old Dominion in the second round.

== Roster ==
Number	Name	Position	Height	Weight	Year	Hometown
1	Shane Porchea	Guard	6–5	210	Sophomore	Decatur, Georgia
5	Ty Greene	Guard	6–2	180	Freshman	Knoxville, Tennessee
11	Jeremy Ford	Guard	6–1	170	Junior	Varnville, South Carolina
12	Ricardo Glenn	Forward	6–8	246	Sophomore	Augusta, Georgia
13	Fred Miller	Guard	6–4	200	Freshman	Atlanta, Georgia
14	Aru Kok	Center	6–10	210	Sophomore	Perth, Australia
15	Adrian Rodgers	Guard	6–4	205	Freshman	Alpharetta, Georgia
22	Bruce Haynes	Guard	6–2	195	Freshman	Summerville, South Carolina
23	Torrey Craig	Forward	6–6	215	Sophomore	Great Falls, South Carolina
24	Jodd Maxey	Forward	6–8	200	Sophomore	Statham, Georgia
30	Rob Elam	Forward	6–6	218	Junior	East Point, Georgia
31	Mario Blessing	Guard	6–2	165	Freshman	Kusterdingen, Germany
32	Chalmers Rogers	Forward	6–7	220	Senior	Fort Mill, South Carolina
33	Carter Cook	Guard	6–5	225	Senior	Winston-Salem, North Carolina
34	Babatunde Olumuyiwa	Forward/Center	6–8	220	Sophomore	Athens, Georgia

== Schedule ==
Date time, TV	Rank^{#}	Opponent^{#}	Result	Record	Site (attendance) city, state
Regular season
11/11/2011*; 7:00 pm		at Arkansas	L 63–83	0–1	Bud Walton Arena (13,093); Fayetteville, AR
11/14/2011*; 7:00 pm		Piedmont	W 91–66	1–1	G. B. Hodge Center (754); Spartanburg, SC
11/18/2011*; 7:00 pm		at Texas-Pan American; UTPA Tip-Off Classic	W 70–66	2–1	UTPA Fieldhouse (478); Edinburg, TX
11/19/2011*; 4:30 pm		vs. Toledo; UTPA Tip-Off Classic	L 70–75	2–2	UTPA Fieldhouse (347); Edinburg, TX
11/20/2011*; 4:30 pm		vs. Texas State; UTPA Tip-Off Classic	W 82–74	3–2	UTPA Fieldhouse (231); Edinburg, TX
11/25/2011*; 3:00 pm		Texas-Pan American	W 78–63	4–2	G. B. Hodge Center (409); Spartanburg, SC
11/27/2011*; 4:00 pm		Victory	W 88–54	5–2	G. B. Hodge Center (417); Spartanburg, SC
12/01/2011*; 7:00 pm		Jacksonville State	W 50–48	6–2	G. B. Hodge Center (704); Spartanburg, SC
12/04/2011*; 2:00 pm, WMYA		at UNC Asheville	L 81–88	6–3	Kimmel Arena (1,796); Asheville, NC
12/11/2011*; 2:00 pm, FS Ohio		at Dayton	L 68–72	6–4	UD Arena (11,331); Dayton, OH
12/14/2011*; 2:00 pm, BTN		at No. 2 Ohio State	L 58–82	6–5	Value City Arena (13,552); Columbus, OH
12/17/2011; 3:15 pm		at Stetson	W 79–63	7–5 (1–0)	Edmunds Center (625); DeLand, FL
12/19/2011; 7:30 pm		at Florida Gulf Coast	W 80–75	8–5 (2–0)	Alico Arena (1,183); Ft. Myers, FL
12/31/2011*; 12:00 pm, SportSouth		at South Carolina	L 66–72	8–6	Colonial Life Arena (6,876); Columbia, SC
01/04/2012; 7:00 pm		at East Tennessee State	L 73–88	8–7 (2–1)	ETSU/Mountain States Health Alliance Athletic Center (2,768); Johnson City, TN
01/07/2012; 2:00 pm		Kennesaw State	W 68–53	9–7 (3–1)	G. B. Hodge Center (623); Spartanburg, SC
01/09/2012; 7:30 pm		Mercer	L 66–73	9–8 (3–2)	G. B. Hodge Center (694); Spartanburg, SC
01/14/2012; 7:00 pm		at North Florida	W 69–62	10–8 (4–2)	UNF Arena (1,388); Jacksonville, FL
01/16/2012; 7:00 pm		at Jacksonville	L 74–77 ^{OT}	10–9 (4–3)	Jacksonville Veterans Memorial Arena (1,014); Jacksonville, FL
01/21/2012; 2:00 pm		Belmont	W 79–78	11–9 (5–3)	G. B. Hodge Center (781); Spartanburg, SC
01/23/2012; 7:00 pm		Lipscomb	W 61–52	12–9 (6–3)	G. B. Hodge Center (744); Spartanburg, SC
01/27/2012; 7:00 pm, CSS		East Tennessee State	W 58–54	13–9 (7–3)	G. B. Hodge Center (818); Spartanburg, SC
01/30/2012*; 5:15 pm		at Jacksonville State	W 82–77	14–9	Pete Mathews Coliseum (1,322); Jacksonville, AL
02/04/2012; 4:30 pm		at Mercer	L 47–61	14–10 (7–4)	University Center (3,007); Macon, GA
02/06/2012; 7:00 pm, ESPN3		at Kennesaw State	W 70–58	15–10 (8–4)	KSU Convocation Center (702); Kennesaw, GA
02/11/2012; 2:00 pm		Jacksonville	W 70–66	16–10 (9–4)	G. B. Hodge Center (818); Spartanburg, SC
02/13/2012; 7:00 pm		North Florida	W 77–52	17–10 (10–4)	G. B. Hodge Center (765); Spartanburg, SC
02/18/2012; 7:30 pm, ESPN3		at Lipscomb	W 62–61	18–10 (11–4)	Allen Arena (2,802); Nashville, TN
02/20/2012; 7:00 pm		at Belmont	L 79–88	18–11 (11–5)	Curb Event Center (1,809); Nashville, TN
02/23/2012; 7:30 pm		Florida Gulf Coast	W 87–74	19–11 (12–5)	G. B. Hodge Center (782); Spartanburg, SC
02/25/2012; 2:00 pm		Stetson	W 90–72	20–11 (13–5)	G. B. Hodge Center (608); Spartanburg, SC
2012 Atlantic Sun men's basketball tournament
03/01/2012; 8:30 pm		vs. Florida Gulf Coast; Quarterfinals	L 61–71	20–12	University Center (952); Macon, GA
2012 CIT
03/15/2012*; 7:00 pm		Kent State; First Round	W 73–58	21–12	G. B. Hodge Center (818); Spartanburg, SC
03/18/2012*; 3:00 pm		at Old Dominion; Second Round	L 56–65	21–13	Norfolk Scope Arena (2,091); Norfolk, VA
*Non-conference game. ^{#}Rankings from AP Poll. (#) Tournament seedings in parentheses. All times are in Eastern Time.
