= Chris Garner (basketball) =

American basketball player

Personal information
- Born: February 23, 1975 (age 51) Memphis, Tennessee
- Listed height: 5 ft 10 in (1.78 m)
- Listed weight: 156 lb (71 kg)

Career information
- High school: Treadwell (Memphis, Tennessee)
- College: Memphis (1993–1997)
- NBA draft: 1997: undrafted
- Playing career: 1997–2010
- Position: Point guard
- Number: 00, 2

Career history
- 1997–1998: Toronto Raptors
- 1998–1999: Idaho Stampede
- 1999: Fort Wayne Fury
- 1999: Quad City Thunder
- 2000: Žalgiris Kaunas
- 2000–2001: Memphis Houn'Dawgs
- 2001: Quad City Thunder
- 2001: Golden State Warriors
- 2001: STB Le Havre
- 2001–2002: Columbus Riverdragons
- 2002–2003: Idaho Stampede
- 2003: Cocodrilos de Caracas
- 2003: Yakima Sun Kings
- 2004: Maccabi Rishon LeZion
- 2004–2005: Maccabi Giv'at Shmuel
- 2005: Paris Basket Racing
- 2005–2006: Gymnastikos S. Larissas
- 2006: Cholet Basket
- 2007: Apollon Patras
- 2007–2008: Achilleas
- 2008: Polpak Świecie
- 2008–2009: Basket Kwidzyn
- 2009–2010: Achilleas

Career highlights
- CBA steals leader (2001)

Career NBA statistics
- Points: 72 (1.6 ppg)
- Assists: 63 (1.4 apg)
- Rebounds: 36 (0.8 rpg)
- Stats at NBA.com
- Stats at Basketball Reference

Christopher Winslow Garner (born February 23, 1975) is an American former professional basketball player who played in the National Basketball Association (NBA).

== College career ==
Garner played collegiately at the University of Memphis.

== Professional career ==
Garner, a 5-foot-10-inch (1.78 m) point guard, was not drafted by an NBA franchise but played parts of 2 seasons with the Toronto Raptors and Golden State Warriors; 1997–1998, and 2000–2001, respectively. In 2003, he was signed by the Detroit Pistons, but was waived prior to the start of the 2003-04 NBA season.

He played one season with the Memphis Houn'Dawgs in the ABA.

Garner also played professionally in Lithuania, France, Israel, Cyprus, Greece, and other countries.
