= Ronnie Robinson (basketball) =

American basketball player (1951–2004)

Personal information
- Born: March 9, 1951 Memphis, Tennessee, U.S.
- Died: March 8, 2004 (aged 52) Memphis, Tennessee, U.S.
- Listed height: 6 ft 8 in (2.03 m)
- Listed weight: 200 lb (91 kg)

Career information
- High school: Melrose (Memphis, Tennessee)
- College: Memphis (1970–1973)
- NBA draft: 1973: 4th round, 60th overall pick
- Drafted by: Phoenix Suns
- Position: Power forward
- Number: 33, 35, 31

Career history
- 1973–1974: Utah Stars
- 1974–1975: Memphis Tams / Sounds

Career highlights
- 3× First-team All-MVC (1971–1973); No. 33 retired by Memphis Tigers
- Stats at Basketball Reference

Ronnie Robinson (March 9, 1951 – May 8, 2004) was an American basketball player.

Robinson played high school basketball at Memphis Melrose High School, where one of his teammates was his future college and professional teammate, Larry Finch.

Robinson played college basketball in his hometown at Memphis State University. Robinson, Finch and Larry Kenon led Memphis State to the 1973 Final Four; the Tigers lost to the undefeated, Bill Walton-led UCLA Bruins in the Finals. Affectionately nicknamed "The Big Cat" for his leaping ability, Robinson is one of eight University of Memphis Tigers basketball players to have his jersey number retired by the school.

A 6'8", 225 pound forward, Robinson finished his college career prior to the ABA-NBA merger and thus was selected in the fourth round of the 1973 NBA draft by the Phoenix Suns and in the first round of the 1973 ABA Draft by the Utah Stars. Robinson opted for the American Basketball Association and began the 1973–74 season with the Stars. In January, the Memphis Tams traded Johnny Neumann to Utah for Robinson, Glen Combs, Mike Jackson and cash. With the Stars and Tams throughout the 1973–74 season, Robinson appeared in 62 games, averaging 6.4 points and 4.5 rebounds per game.

Robinson spent the 1974–75 season with the Memphis Sounds. With the Sounds, Robinson appeared in only 10 games, averaging 4.0 points and 2.7 rebounds per game.
