= Joe Jackson (basketball) =

American professional basketball player (born 1992)

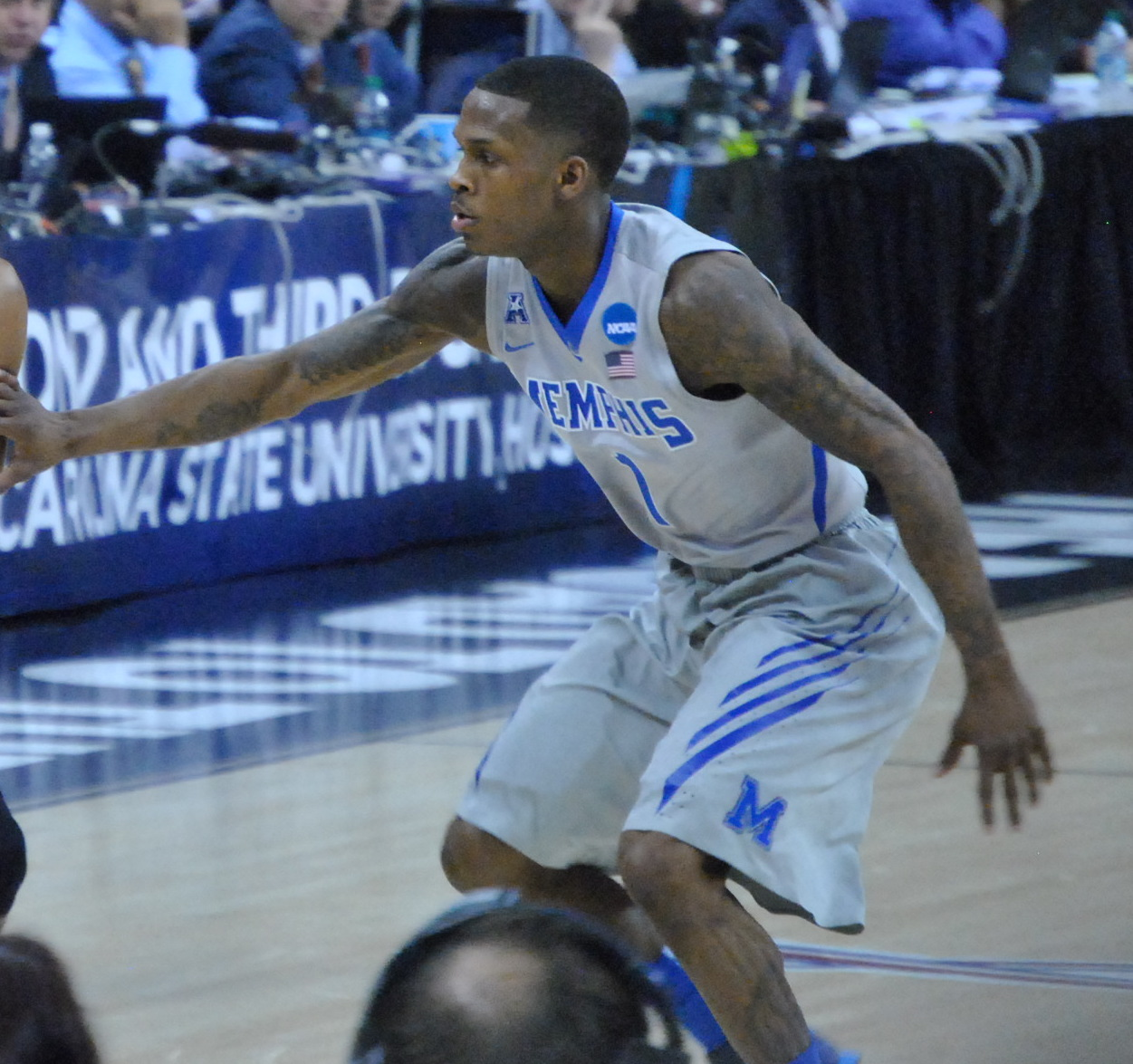

Personal information
- Born: February 8, 1992 (age 34) Memphis, Tennessee, U.S.
- Listed height: 6 ft 1 in (1.85 m)
- Listed weight: 171 lb (78 kg)

Career information
- High school: White Station (Memphis, Tennessee)
- College: Memphis (2010–2014)
- NBA draft: 2014: undrafted
- Playing career: 2014–2017
- Position: Point guard

Career history
- 2014–2015: Bakersfield Jam
- 2015–2016: Goyang Orion Orions
- 2016: Luoyang Zhonghe
- 2016: Maccabi Rishon LeZion
- 2017: Northern Arizona Suns

Career highlights
- KBL champion (2016); NBA D-League Most Improved Player (2015); NBA D-League All-Defensive Second Team (2015); Conference USA Player of the Year (2013); Second-team All-AAC (2014); First-team All-Conference USA (2013); 2× C-USA tournament MVP (2011, 2012); McDonald's All-American (2010); First-team Parade All-American (2010); Class AAA Tennessee Mr. Basketball (2010)
- Stats at Basketball Reference

Joseph Nathaniel Jackson (born February 8, 1992) is an American professional basketball player who last played for the Northern Arizona Suns of the NBA G League. He played college basketball for the University of Memphis where he was named the 2013 Conference USA Player of the Year.

== Early life ==
Jackson was born in Memphis, Tennessee to parents Lachaundra Jackson and Joseph Burns. Due to his parents struggles financially and living in a difficult area where Jackson was constantly getting into trouble and not attending school, he and his two younger sisters moved in with his grandmother, Lillie Cox. As a seventh grader, Jackson was rarely attending school, but after moving in with his grandmother, his life began to turn around during eight grade.

== High school career ==
Jackson was a consensus top 15 recruit coming out of White Station High School in Memphis, Tennessee. As a senior in 2009–10, he averaged 29.3 points, 6.2 rebounds, 3.9 assists and 2.8 steals per game. He also finished his four-year prep career having scored 3,451 points (23.2 per game) and amassed the second-highest points total in the history of Shelby-Metro area high school basketball. Jackson was named the 2009–10 Tennessee Mr. Basketball for Class AAA; he was also named a McDonald's High School All-American as well as a first-team Parade All-American. In the 2010 McDonald's All-American Game, Jackson recorded two points, two assists and one rebound in 12 minutes of playing time.

== College career ==
Jackson struggled to adapt to the pace and size of college basketball in his freshman season and through the midpoint of his sophomore season despite his solid statistics – 9.9 points and 3.1 assists in 2010–11 followed by 11.0 points and 3.8 assists in 2011–12. The Tigers won the Conference USA tournament his freshman year, then won both the regular season and conference tournament championships in his sophomore campaign. Jackson was named the MVP for both the 2011 and the 2012 Conference tournaments.

In 2012–13, his junior season, Jackson averaged 13.6 points, 4.8 assists, 3.3 rebounds and 1.7 steals for a Memphis team that went undefeated in conference play (16–0), qualified for the 2013 NCAA tournament as the number six seed (advancing to the Round of 32) and finished with an overall record of 31–5. He surpassed the 1,000-point mark for his career, was an All-Conference First Team selection and was honored as the Conference USA Player of the Year.

On February 13, 2014, he was named one of the 30 finalists for Naismith College Player of the Year award.

== Professional career ==
After going undrafted in the 2014 NBA draft, Jackson joined the Memphis Grizzlies for the 2014 NBA Summer League. On September 26, 2014, he signed with the Phoenix Suns. However, he was later waived by the Suns on October 14, 2014. On November 2, 2014, he was acquired by the Bakersfield Jam as an affiliate player. On April 16, 2015, he was named the D-League's Most Improved Player for the 2014–15 season after improving from 6.0 points per game during December to 17.7 points per game during March. On the season, he averaged 13.9 points, 3.5 rebounds, 4.9 assists and 1.5 steals in 38 games.

In July 2015, Jackson was selected with the 14th pick of the 2015 KBL draft by the Goyang Orion Orions, signing with them afterwards. As a rookie in the 2015–16 KBL season, Jackson mostly came off the bench behind another American player Aaron Haynes who is a veteran scorer in KBL. Initially, Jackson played limited minutes, but as the season continued, he began to see some more playing time. By the end of the season, he averaged 18.56 minutes a game (PPG 14.4, APG 4.4). His team advanced to the KBL finals in the playoffs against Jeonju KCC Egis (regular season champions), and won the championship.

On May 23, 2016, Jackson signed with Chinese club Luoyang Zhonghe for the 2016 NBL season. On August 16, 2016, Jackson signed with Israeli club Maccabi Rishon LeZion. He was released by Maccabi after appearing in only two games.

On February 27, 2017, Jackson signed with the Northern Arizona Suns of the NBA Development League.
