= 2011–12 Mid-American Conference men's basketball season =

- League: NCAA Division I
- Sport: Basketball
- Teams: 12

Regular season
- League champions: Akron
- Runners-up: Buffalo
- Season MVP: Mitchell Watt

Tournament
- Champions: Ohio
- Runners-up: Akron
- Finals MVP: DJ Cooper

Mid-American men's basketball seasons

2011–12 Mid-American Conference men's basketball standings
	Conf.				Overall
Team	W		L	PCT	W		L	PCT
East
Akron	13	–	3	.813	22	–	12	.647
Buffalo	12	–	4	.750	20	–	11	.645
Ohio†	11	–	5	.688	29	–	8	.784
Kent State	10	–	6	.625	21	–	12	.636
Bowling Green	9	–	7	.563	16	–	16	.500
Miami	5	–	11	.313	9	–	21	.300
West
Eastern Michigan	9	–	7	.563	14	–	18	.438
Toledo	7	–	9	.438	19	–	17	.528
Western Michigan	6	–	10	.375	14	–	20	.412
Ball State	6	–	10	.375	15	–	15	.500
Central Michigan	5	–	11	.313	11	–	21	.344
Northern Illinois	3	–	13	.188	5	–	26	.161
† 2012 MAC tournament winner As of March 23, 2012; Rankings from AP Poll

The 2011–12 Mid-American Conference men's basketball season began with practices in October 2011, followed by the start of the 2011–12 NCAA Division I men's basketball season in November. Conference play began in January 2012 and concluded in March 2012. Akron won the regular season title with a conference record of 13–3 over second place Buffalo. Third-seeded Ohio defeated Akron in the MAC tournament final and represented the MAC in the NCAA tournament where they defeated Michigan and South Florida then lost in the Sweet Sixteen to top-seeded North Carolina in overtime.

== Preseason awards ==
The preseason poll and league awards were announced by the league office on October 28, 2015.

=== Preseason men's basketball poll ===
(First place votes in parentheses)

==== East Division ====
1. Kent State 132 (16)
2. Akron 104 (8)
3. Ohio 94
4. Miami 80
5. Buffalo 62
6. Bowling Green 32

==== West Division ====
1. Western Michigan 128 (14)
2. Ball State 111 (9)
3. Central Michigan 92 (1)
4. Toledo 76
5. Northern Illinois 59
6. Eastern Michigan 38

==== Tournament champs ====
Kent State (12), Akron (6), Ball State (3), Western Michigan (2), Central Michigan (1)

=== Honors ===
Honor	Recipient
Preseason All-MAC East	D.J. Cooper, G, Ohio
Preseason All-MAC East	Justin Greene, F, Kent State
Preseason All-MAC East	Zeke Marshall, C, Akron
Preseason All-MAC East	Julian Mavunga, F, Miami
Preseason All-MAC East	Javon McCrea, F, Buffalo
Preseason All-MAC West	Randy Davis, G, Ball State
Preseason All-MAC West	Jarrod Jones, F, Ball State
Preseason All-MAC West	Demetrius Ward, F, Western Michigan
Preseason All-MAC West	Flenard Whitfield, F, Western Michigan
Preseason All-MAC West	Trey Zeigler, G, Central Michigan

== Postseason ==
=== Postseason awards ===
1. Coach of the Year: Rob Murphy, Eastern Michigan
2. Player of the Year: Mitchell Watt, Buffalo
3. Freshman of the Year: Julius Brown, Toledo
4. Defensive Player of the Year: Zeke Marshall, Akron
5. Sixth Man of the Year: Quincy Diggs, Akron

=== Honors ===
Honor	Recipient
Postseason All-MAC First Team	Mitchell Watt, Buffalo
Postseason All-MAC First Team	Javon McCrea, Buffalo
Postseason All-MAC First Team	Justin Greene, Kent State
Postseason All-MAC First Team	Julian Mavunga, Miami
Postseason All-MAC First Team	D.J. Cooper, Ohio
Postseason All-MAC Second Team	Zeke Marshall, Akron
Postseason All-MAC Second Team	Alex Abreu, Akron
Postseason All-MAC Second Team	Jarrod Jones, Ball State
Postseason All-MAC Second Team	A'uston Calhoun, Bowling Green
Postseason All-MAC Second Team	Rian Pearson, Toledo
Postseason All-MAC Third Team	Lamonte Bearden, G, Buffalo
Postseason All-MAC Third Team	Scott Thomas, Bowling Green
Postseason All-MAC Third Team	Trey Zeigler, Central Michigan
Postseason All-MAC Third Team	Darrell Lampley, Eastern Michigans
Postseason All-MAC Third Team	Michael Porrini, Kent State
Postseason All-MAC Honorable Mention	Randal Holt, Kent State
Postseason All-MAC Honorable Mention	Carlton Guyton, Kent State
Postseason All-MAC Honorable Mention	Ivo Baltic, Ohio
Postseason All-MAC Honorable Mention	Walter Offutt, Ohio
Postseason All-MAC Honorable Mention	Curtis Dennis, Toledo
Postseason All-MAC Honorable Mention	Flenard Whitfield, Western Michigan
All-MAC Freshman Team	Aaron Adeoye, Ball State
All-MAC Freshman Team	Austin McBroom, Central Michigan
All-MAC Freshman Team	Brian Sullivan, Miami
All-MAC Freshman Team	Abdel Nader, Northern Illinois
All-MAC Freshman Team	Julius Brown, Toledo

== See also ==
2011–12 Mid-American Conference women's basketball season
