= 2011–12 Kent State Golden Flashes men's basketball team =

American college basketball season

2011–12 Kent State Golden Flashes men's basketball

CIT, First Round
- Conference: Mid-American Conference
- East Division
- Record: 21–12 (10–6 MAC)
- Head coach: Rob Senderoff (1st season)
- Assistant coaches: Bobby Steinburg; Eric Haut; Jordan Mincy
- Home arena: Memorial Athletic and Convocation Center

2011–12 Mid-American Conference men's basketball standings
	Conf.				Overall
Team	W		L	PCT	W		L	PCT
East
Akron	13	–	3	.813	22	–	12	.647
Buffalo	12	–	4	.750	20	–	11	.645
Ohio†	11	–	5	.688	29	–	8	.784
Kent State	10	–	6	.625	21	–	12	.636
Bowling Green	9	–	7	.563	16	–	16	.500
Miami	5	–	11	.313	9	–	21	.300
West
Eastern Michigan	9	–	7	.563	14	–	18	.438
Toledo	7	–	9	.438	19	–	17	.528
Western Michigan	6	–	10	.375	14	–	20	.412
Ball State	6	–	10	.375	15	–	15	.500
Central Michigan	5	–	11	.313	11	–	21	.344
Northern Illinois	3	–	13	.188	5	–	26	.161
† 2012 MAC tournament winner As of March 23, 2012; Rankings from AP Poll

The 2011–12 Kent State Golden Flashes men's basketball team represented Kent State University during the 2011–12 NCAA Division I men's basketball season. The Golden Flashes, led by first year head coach Rob Senderoff, played their home games at the Memorial Athletic and Convocation Center and are members of the East Division of the Mid-American Conference.

They finished the season 21–12, 10–6 in MAC play to finish in fourth place in the East Division. They lost in the semifinals of the MAC Basketball tournament to Akron. They were invited to the 2012 CollegeInsider.com Tournament where they lost in the first round to USC Upstate.

== Roster ==
Number	Name	Position	Height	Weight	Year	Hometown
0	Bryson Pope	Guard	6–6	220	Junior	Jenks, Oklahoma
1	Eric Gaines	Guard	6–4	180	Sophomore	Chicago, Illinois
2	Michael Porrini	Guard	6–2	200	Senior	Massillon, Ohio
3	Randal Holt	Guard	6–1	180	Junior	Cleveland, Ohio
5	Chris Evans	Forward	6–7	210	Junior	Chesapeake, Virginia
11	Carlton Guyton	Guard	6–4	175	Senior	Chicago, Illinois
13	Mark Henniger	Forward	6–9	215	Sophomore	Massillon, Ohio
15	Kris Brewer	Guard	6–4	185	Freshman	Memphis, Tennessee
20	Justin Brunswick	Forward	6–10	215	Sophomore	Middletown, Ohio
21	Devareaux Manley	Guard	6–4	195	Freshman	Oakland, California
23	Patrick Jackson	Forward	6–6	210	Junior	Brooklyn, New York
30	Brian Frank	Forward	6–5	215	Junior	Gainesville, Florida
32	Scooter Johnson	Forward	6–6	200	Sophomore	Cleveland, Ohio
33	Justin Manns	Center	6–11	230	Senior	Winston-Salem, North Carolina
34	Justin Greene	Forward	6–8	230	Senior	Brooklyn, New York
42	Shakir Dunning	Guard	6–1	195	Freshman	Columbus, Ohio

== Schedule ==
Date time, TV	Rank^{#}	Opponent^{#}	Result	Record	Site (attendance) city, state
Exhibition
11/07/2011*; 7:00 pm		Rochester College	W 76–63		M.A.C. Center (NA); Kent, OH
Regular season
11/15/2011*; 10:00 am, ESPN		at West Virginia; ESPN College Hoops Tip-Off Marathon	W 70–60	1–0	WVU Coliseum (5,616); Morgantown, WV
11/19/2011*; 7:00 pm		Alcorn State	W 77–58	2–0	M.A.C. Center (3,175); Kent, OH
11/22/2011*; 7:30 pm		Cleveland State	L 53–57	2–1	M.A.C. Center (6,327); Kent, OH
11/28/2011*; 7:00 pm		Louisiana-Lafayette	W 76–67	3–1	M.A.C. Center (2,683); Kent, OH
12/01/2011*; 7:00 pm		Morehead State	W 83–63	4–1	M.A.C. Center (3,135); Kent, OH
12/03/2011*; 7:00 pm		UAB	W 57–48	4–2	M.A.C. Center (3,624); Kent, OH
12/06/2011*; 7:00 pm		at James Madison	W 71–51	6–1	JMU Convocation Center (3,103); Harrisonburg, VA
12/10/2011*; 2:00 pm		at Western Carolina	W 58–56	7–1	Ramsey Center (1,565); Cullowhee, NC
12/20/2011*; 7:30 pm		vs. Saint Peter's; Athletes in Action Classic	W 67–58	8–1	Smith Spectrum (1,012); Logan, UT
12/21/2011*; 7:30 pm		vs. Texas–Arlington; Athletes in Action Classic	L 73–74	8–2	Smith Spectrum (959); Logan, UT
12/22/2011*; 10:00 pm		at Utah State; Athletes in Action Classic	L 62–81	8–3	Smith Spectrum (10,059); Logan, UT
12/29/2011*; 8:30 pm		at Arkansas State	W 69–54	9–3	Convocation Center (4,638); Jonesboro, AR
01/02/2012*; 7:00 pm		Shawnee State	W 90–65	10–3	M.A.C. Center (1,750); Kent, OH
01/07/2012; 6:00 pm, TWCSN		at Buffalo	L 65–66	10–4 (0–1)	Alumni Arena (2,386); Amherst, NY
01/11/2012; 7:00 pm		Miami (OH)	W 71–67	11–4 (1–1)	M.A.C. Center (3,281); Kent, OH
01/14/2012; 7:00 pm		Bowling Green	W 92–87	12–4 (2–1)	M.A.C. Center (3,610); Kent, OH
01/18/2012; 7:00 pm, STO		at Ohio	L 65–87	12–5 (2–2)	Convocation Center (5,924); Athens, OH
01/21/2012; 6:00 pm, STO		at Akron	L 75–84	12–6 (2–3)	James A. Rhodes Arena (5,252); Akron, OH
01/25/2012; 7:00 pm		Northern Illinois	W 90–56	13–6 (3–3)	M.A.C. Center (2,753); Kent, OH
01/28/2012; 7:00 pm		at Toledo	W 77–61	14–6 (4–3)	Savage Arena (4,720); Toledo, OH
01/31/2012; 7:00 pm, STO		at Central Michigan	W 67–60	15–6 (5–3)	McGuirk Arena (933); Mount Pleasant, MI
02/04/2012; 7:00 pm		Western Michigan	W 78–73	16–6 (6–3)	M.A.C Center (3,762); Kent, OH
02/08/2012; 7:00 pm		at Eastern Michigan	W 62–58	17–6 (7–3)	EMU Convocation Center (644); Ypsilanti, MI
02/11/2012; 11:00 am, ESPNU		Ball State	W 76–55	18–6 (8–3)	M.A.C. Center (2,472); Kent, OH
02/14/2012; 3:00 pm, STO		Buffalo	W 76–71	19–6 (9–3)	M.A.C. Center (2,622); Kent, OH
02/18/2012*; 6:00 pm, STO		College of Charleston; ESPN BracketBusters	L 73–80	19–7	M.A.C. Center (3,682); Kent, OH
02/21/2012; 7:00 pm, STO		at Miami (OH)	L 60–62	19–8 (9–4)	Millett Hall (2,134); Oxford, OH
02/25/2012; 6:00 pm, STO		at Bowling Green	L 58–74	19–9 (9–5)	Stroh Center (2,612); Bowling Green, OH
02/29/2012; 7:00 pm		Ohio	W 68–61	20–9 (10–5)	M.A.C. Center (2,965); Kent, OH
03/02/2012; 7:00 pm, ESPN2		Akron	L 55–61	20–10 (10–6)	M.A.C. Center (6,335); Kent, OH
2012 MAC men's basketball tournament
03/08/2012; 7:00 pm, STO		vs. Western Michigan; Quarterfinals	W 76–72	21–10	Quicken Loans Arena (3,351); Cleveland, OH
03/09/2012; 7:00 pm, STO		vs. Akron; Semifinals	L 74–78	21–11	Quicken Loans Arena (8,513); Cleveland, OH
2012 CIT
03/15/2012*; 7:00 pm		at USC Upstate; First Round	L 58–73	21–12	G. B. Hodge Center (818); Spartanburg, SC
*Non-conference game. ^{#}Rankings from AP Poll. (#) Tournament seedings in parentheses. All times are in Eastern Time.
