= 2012 MAC men's basketball tournament =

- 2012 MAC Tournament logo
- Classification: Division I
- Season: 2011–12
- Teams: 12
- Site: Quicken Loans Arena; Cleveland, Ohio
- Champions: Ohio Bobcats (6th title)
- Winning coach: John Groce (2nd title)
- MVP: D. J. Cooper (Ohio)
- Attendance: 10,301
- Television: SportsTime Ohio and ESPN2
- MAC men's basketball tournaments

2011–12 Mid-American Conference men's basketball standings
	Conf.				Overall
Team	W		L	PCT	W		L	PCT
East
Akron	13	–	3	.813	22	–	12	.647
Buffalo	12	–	4	.750	20	–	11	.645
Ohio†	11	–	5	.688	29	–	8	.784
Kent State	10	–	6	.625	21	–	12	.636
Bowling Green	9	–	7	.563	16	–	16	.500
Miami	5	–	11	.313	9	–	21	.300
West
Eastern Michigan	9	–	7	.563	14	–	18	.438
Toledo	7	–	9	.438	19	–	17	.528
Western Michigan	6	–	10	.375	14	–	20	.412
Ball State	6	–	10	.375	15	–	15	.500
Central Michigan	5	–	11	.313	11	–	21	.344
Northern Illinois	3	–	13	.188	5	–	26	.161
† 2012 MAC tournament winner As of March 23, 2012; Rankings from AP Poll

The 2012 Mid-American Conference men's basketball tournament is the post-season men's basketball tournament for the Mid-American Conference (MAC) 2011–12 college basketball season. Third-seeded Ohio won the tournament received the MAC's automatic bid into the NCAA Men's Division I Basketball Championship tournament. There they defeated Michigan and South Florida before losing to North Carolina in overtime in the Sweet sixteen. DJ Cooper of Ohio was named the tournament MVP.

== Format ==
The format for the conference tournament was modified for this season. The new format seeds the tournament by rewarding the No. 1 and No. 2 seeds with a bye into the semifinal round, while the No. 3 and No. 4 seeds received a bye to the quarterfinal round. Seeding was determined by winning percentage in conference games, regardless of division. First round games were played on campus sites at the higher seed. The remaining rounds were held at Quicken Loans Arena.

=== Seeds ===
Seed	Team	Record	Tiebreaker #1	Tiebreaker #2
1	Akron	13–3		
2	Buffalo	12–4		
3	Ohio	11–5		
4	Kent State	10–6		
5	Eastern Michigan	9–7	1–0 vs. BGSU	
6	Bowling Green	9–7	0–1 vs. EMU	
7	Toledo	7–9		
8	Western Michigan	6–10	1–1 vs. BSU	Same record as BSU vs. teams ranked #1–7; 1–0 vs. #10 Miami
9	Ball State	6–10	1–1 vs. WMU	Same record as WMU vs. teams ranked #1–7; 0–1 vs. #10 Miami
10	Miami	5–11	1–0 vs. CMU	
11	Central Michigan	5–11	0–1 vs. MIA	
12	Northern Illinois	3–13		

== Bracket ==
First round Monday, March 5, 2012
12	Northern Illinois	55
5	Eastern Michigan	52
9	Ball State	63
8	Western Michigan	69
11	Central Michigan	54
6	Bowling Green	53
10	Miami (OH)	53
7	Toledo	60

Second round Wednesday, March 7, 2012; STO
12	Northern Illinois	54
8	Western Michigan	71
11	Central Michigan	72
7	Toledo	75

Quarterfinals; Thursday, Match 8, 2012; STO
4	Kent State	76
8	Western Michigan	72
3	Ohio	65
7	Toledo	57

Semifinals; Friday, March 9, 2012; STO
1	Akron	78
4	Kent State	74
2	Buffalo	74
3	Ohio	77

Championship Game; Saturday, March 10, 2012; ESPN2
1	Akron	63
3	Ohio	64

== All-Tournament Team ==
Tournament MVP – DJ Cooper, Ohio

Player	Team
Justin Greene	Kent State
Mitchell Watt	Buffalo
Alex Abreu	Akron
Nick Kellogg	Ohio
DJ Cooper	Ohio
