= 2011–12 Eastern Michigan Eagles men's basketball team =

American college basketball season

2011–12 Eastern Michigan Eagles men's basketball

MAC West Division Champions
- Conference: Mid-American Conference
- West Division
- Record: 14–18 (9–7 MAC)
- Head coach: Rob Murphy (1st season)
- Assistant coaches: Mike Brown; Kevin Mondro; Benny White
- Home arena: Convocation Center

2011–12 Mid-American Conference men's basketball standings
	Conf.				Overall
Team	W		L	PCT	W		L	PCT
East
Akron	13	–	3	.813	22	–	12	.647
Buffalo	12	–	4	.750	20	–	11	.645
Ohio†	11	–	5	.688	29	–	8	.784
Kent State	10	–	6	.625	21	–	12	.636
Bowling Green	9	–	7	.563	16	–	16	.500
Miami	5	–	11	.313	9	–	21	.300
West
Eastern Michigan	9	–	7	.563	14	–	18	.438
Toledo	7	–	9	.438	19	–	17	.528
Western Michigan	6	–	10	.375	14	–	20	.412
Ball State	6	–	10	.375	15	–	15	.500
Central Michigan	5	–	11	.313	11	–	21	.344
Northern Illinois	3	–	13	.188	5	–	26	.161
† 2012 MAC tournament winner As of March 23, 2012; Rankings from AP Poll

The 2011–12 Eastern Michigan Eagles men's basketball team represented Eastern Michigan University during the 2011–12 NCAA Division I men's basketball season. The Eagles, led by first year head coach Rob Murphy, played their home games at the Eastern Michigan University Convocation Center and were members of the West Division of the Mid-American Conference. They finished the season 14–18, 9–7 in MAC play to finish in first place in the West Division. It was the Eagles first MAC West title. However, the Eagles lost in the first round of the MAC tournament by Northern Illinois.

== Roster ==
Number	Name	Position	Height	Weight	Year	Hometown	Previous College/HS
1	Da'Shonte Riley	Center	7–0	233	Sophomore	Detroit, Michigan	Syracuse
2	J.R. Sims	Guard	6–3	180	Red-Shirt Sophomore	Fort Wayne, Indiana	Snider
3	Austin Harper	Guard	6–2	185	Red-Shirt Sophomore	Grand Haven, Michigan	Western Michigan
5	Derek Thompson	Guard	6–3	180	Junior	Detroit, Michigan	Southeast Missouri State
12	Antoine Chandler	Guard	5–10	155	Freshman	Windsor, Canada	W.F. Herman Secondary
13	Antonio Green	Guard	6-3	190	Senior	Inkster, Michigan	Robichaud
20	Quintin Dailey	Guard	6-3	175	Senior	Las Vegas, Nevada	Sheridan (Wyo.) J.C.
23	Glenn Bryant	Forward	6–8	201	Sophomore	Detroit, Michigan	Arkansas
32	Jamell Harris	Forward	6–9	201	Junior	Euclid, Ohio	Euclid
33	Anthony Strickland	Guard	6–5	219	Redshirt Sophomore	Ypsilanti, Michigan	Adrian
34	Darrell Lampley	Guard	5-10	170	Senior	Linden, New Jersey	Lakeland C.C.
35	Daylen Harrison	Guard/Forward	6–6	214	Sophomore	Akron, Ohio	Wyoming
45	Matt Balkema	Center	6–10	286	Junior	Roseville, Michigan	Cousino
51	Kamil Janton	Center	6-10	230	Senior	Tarnow, Poland	Bartlett

== Schedule ==
Date time, TV	Rank^{#}	Opponent^{#}	Result	Record	High points	High rebounds	High assists	Site (attendance) city, state
Regular season
November 11, 2011*; 7:07 pm		Illinois Chicago	W 68–57	1–0	17 – Thompson	7 – Janton	2 – Lampley, Thompson	Convocation Center (1,208); Ypsilanti, MI
November 15, 2011*; 3:30 pm		at Texas Southern; Auto-Owners Spartan Invitational	L 49–66	1–1	15 – Lampley	7 – Harris	4 – Lampley	H&PE Arena (1,103); Houston, TX
November 18, 2011*; 7:06 pm		Arkansas-Little Rock; Auto-Owners Spartan Invitational	W 62–51	2–1	21 – Lampley	10 – Harris	4 – Lampley	Convocation Center (692); Ypsilanti, MI
November 20, 2011*; 4:00 pm		at IUPUI; Auto-Owners Spartan Invitational	W 66–64	3–1	16 – Lampley	9 – Harris	6 – Lampley	The Jungle (1,065); Indianapolis, IN
November 22, 2011*; 12:02 pm, ESPNU		Michigan State; Auto-Owners Spartan Invitational	L 40–72	4–2	14 – Sims	7 – Harris	3 – Lampley	Convocation Center (3711); Ypsilanti, MI
November 23, 2011*; 7:00 pm		Rochester	W 62–43	4–1	12 – Sims	9 – Balkema	3 – Green	Convocation Center (417); Ypsilanti, MI
November 29, 2011*; 7:07 pm		at No. 3 Syracuse	L 48–84	4–3	19 – Lampley	4 – Sims, Dailey	4 – Green	Carrier Dome (16,649); Syracuse, NY
December 01, 2011*; 7:00 pm		at Colgate	L 70–74	4–4	37 – Lampley	8 – Strickland	2 – Lampley	Cotterell Court (522); Hamilton, NY
December 08, 2011*; 8:06 pm		at Drake	L 53–66	4–5	20 – Lampley	9 – Harris	3 – Lampley	Knapp Center (2,898); Des Moines, IA
December 10, 2011*; 4:00 pm, BTN		at Purdue	L 36–61	4–6	15 – Thompson	8 – Harris	1 – Dailey, Lampley, Thompson	Mackey Arena (14,318); West Lafayette, IN
December 20, 2011*; 7:00 pm		at Radford	W 52–48	5–6	13 – Dailey	5 – Strickland	5 – Thompson	Dedmon Center (618); Radford, VA
December 22, 2011*; 7:00 pm, ESPN3		at Virginia Tech	L 50–71	5–7	13 – Green, Lampley	6 – Harris	3 – Lampley	Cassell Coliseum (9,563); Blacksburg, VA
December 29, 2011*; 8:15 pm		at Santa Clara; Cable Car Classic	L 55–75	5–8	14 – Lampley	4 – Harris	2 – Green, Harper, Strickland	Leavey Center (1,782); Santa Clara, CA
December 30, 2011*; 6:00 pm		at vs. Air Force; Cable Car Classic	L 37–42	5–9	9 – Green, Harris	9 – Harris	3 – Green	Leavey Center (1,702); Santa Clara, CA
January 07, 2012; 3:00 pm		Northern Illinois	W 47–40	6–9 (1–0)	16 – Lampley	7 – Harper, Harris	2 – Harris	Convocation Center (615); DeKalb, IL
January 11, 2012; 7:06 pm		Central Michigan	L 56–60	6–10 (1–1)	12 – Harris	10 – Riley	4 – Harper, Lampley	Convocation Center (1,121); Ypsilanti, MI
January 14, 2012; 2:00 pm		at Ball State	W 51–48	7–10 (2–1)	13 – Dailey	8 – Harris	4 – Harper	John E. Worthen Arena (4,050); Muncie, IN
January 18, 2012; 7:06 pm		Western Michigan	W 62–59	8–10 (3–1)	11 – Green	10 – Harris	7 – Harper	Convocation Center (1,008); Ypsilanti, MI
January 21, 2012; 2:06 pm		Toledo	W 41–38	9–10 (4–1)	9 – Lampley	8 – Balkema	3 – Green, Lampley	Convocation Center (1,009); Ypsilanti, MI
January 24, 2012; 7:00 pm		at Buffalo	L 47–65	9–11 (4–2)	14 – Lampley	8 – Riley	2 – Green, Riley	Alumni Arena (2,154); Amherst, NY
January 28, 2012; 6:07 pm, SportsTime Ohio		Bowling Green	W 55–50	10–11 (5–2)	20 – Lampley	7 – Balkema	4 – Lampley	Convocation Center (1,150); Ypsilanti, MI
February 01, 2012; 7:00 pm		at Miami	L 57–62	10–12 (5–3)	17 – Lampley	11 – Riley	3 – Harper, Lampley	Millett Hall (1,547); Oxford, OH
February 04, 2012; 7:30 pm		at Akron	W 77–47	10–13 (5–4)	15 – Balkema	6 – Balkema	5 – Lampley	James A. Rhodes Arena (4,234); Akron, OH
November 22, 2015; 3:30 pm		Kent State	L 58–62	10–14 (5–5)	18 – Lampley	5 – Balkema, Harris, Lampley	7 – Lampley	Convocation Center (644); Ypsilanti, MI
February 11, 2012; 4:36 pm		Ohio; E-Club Hall of Fame Day	W 68–55	11–14 (6–5)	23 – Thompson	7 – Harris	9 – Lampley	Convocation Center (1,473); Ypsilanti, MI
February 14, 2012; 7:00 pm		at Central Michigan	L 52–55	11–15 (6–6)	18 – Thompson	7 – Harris	2 – Harper, Lampley	McGuirk Arena (1,043); Mount Pleasant, MI
February 18, 2012*; 1:00 pm		at Green Bay; Sears BracketBusters	L 49–54	11–16	13 – Lampley	5 – Harris	3 – Green, Lampley	Resch Center (3,539); Green Bay, WI
February 22, 2012; 7:06 pm		Northern Illinois	W 48–45	12–16 (7–6)	21 – Lampley	6 – Riley	5 – Lampley	Convocation Center (813); Ypsilanti, MI
February 25, 2012; 4:36 pm		Ball State; Senior Day	W 61–50	13–16 (8–6)	13 – Lampley	6 – Harris	8 – Lampley	Convocation Center (1,507); Ypsilanti, MI
February 29, 2012; 3:30 pm		at Western Michigan	W 54–53	14–16 (9–6)	–	–	–	University Arena; Kalamazoo, MI
March 03, 2012; 2:00 pm		at Toledo	L 51–76	14–17 (9–7)	13 – Lampley	9 – Harris	5 – Lampley	Savage Arena (4,763); Toledo, OH
MAC tournament
March 05, 2012; 7:06 pm	(5)	(12) Northern Illinois; First round	L 52–55	14–18	13 – Harris, Lampley	8 – Harris	6 – Lampley	Convocation Center (843); Ypsilanti, MI
*Non-conference game. ^{#}Rankings from AP Poll. (#) Tournament seedings in parentheses. All times are in Eastern Time; Source:.

== Awards ==
MAC Coach Of The Year

- Rob Murphy

3rd Team All MAC

- Darrell Lampley
