= Seton Academy (South Holland, Illinois) =

Location
- 16100 Seton Drive; South Holland, Illinois 60473; United States; 41°36′12″N 87°35′9″W

Information
- Type: Private Catholic Coeducational College Prep High School
- Motto: Empowering Faith-Based Scholars and Innovative Leaders
- Religious affiliation: Roman Catholic
- Established: 1963
- Closed: 2016
- Authority: Archdiocese of Chicago
- Principal: Earl McKay
- Grades: 9–12
- Campus: suburban
- Colors: Black; White; Gold
- Athletics conference: Chicago Catholic League
- Team name: Sting
- Accreditation: North Central Association of Colleges and Schools
- Newspaper: The Buzz
- Yearbook: Embers
- School fees: $200
- Tuition: $8,150 (2008–2009)
- Website: www.seton-academy.org (archived)

Seton Academy was a Catholic coeducational college-preparatory high school in South Holland, Illinois.

== History ==
Seton Academy, a Catholic College Preparatory High School located in South Holland, Illinois, was founded in 1963 by the Sisters of Charity of Saint Joseph, a religious order in Cincinnati, Ohio. Originally known as Elizabeth Seton High School, named in honor of Elizabeth Bayley Seton, the first native-born American saint and foundress of the Sisters of Charity, the school upheld its four founding cornerstones of Faith, Leadership, Scholarship and Community. Initially an all-girls school, it became coeducational in 2003.

On January 5, 2016, the Archdiocese of Chicago announced that Seton Academy would close at the end of the 2015–2016 school year due to declining enrollment and increasing operating costs.

== Athletics ==
Girls Volleyball
Boys and Girls Cross Country
Girls Basketball
Cheerleading
Track & Field
Baseball
Boys Basketball
Softball
Football

== Notable alumni ==
- Susan Carlson (1987), news anchor
- D. J. Cooper (2009), basketball player who plays overseas
- Chris Olivier (2010), basketball player who plays overseas
- Javon Freeman-Liberty (2018 - transferred), NBA player
