= 2011–12 Buffalo Bulls men's basketball team =

American college basketball season

2011–12 Buffalo Bulls men's basketball

CIT, Second Round
- Conference: Mid-American Conference
- East Division
- Record: 20–11 (12–4 MAC)
- Head coach: Reggie Witherspoon (13th season)
- Assistant coaches: Kevin Heck; Jordan Gleason; Turner Battle
- Home arena: Alumni Arena

2011–12 Mid-American Conference men's basketball standings
	Conf.				Overall
Team	W		L	PCT	W		L	PCT
East
Akron	13	–	3	.813	22	–	12	.647
Buffalo	12	–	4	.750	20	–	11	.645
Ohio†	11	–	5	.688	29	–	8	.784
Kent State	10	–	6	.625	21	–	12	.636
Bowling Green	9	–	7	.563	16	–	16	.500
Miami	5	–	11	.313	9	–	21	.300
West
Eastern Michigan	9	–	7	.563	14	–	18	.438
Toledo	7	–	9	.438	19	–	17	.528
Western Michigan	6	–	10	.375	14	–	20	.412
Ball State	6	–	10	.375	15	–	15	.500
Central Michigan	5	–	11	.313	11	–	21	.344
Northern Illinois	3	–	13	.188	5	–	26	.161
† 2012 MAC tournament winner As of March 23, 2012; Rankings from AP Poll

The 2011–12 Buffalo Bulls men's basketball team represented the University at Buffalo during the 2011–12 NCAA Division I men's basketball season. The Bulls, led by 13th-year head coach Reggie Witherspoon, played their home games at Alumni Arena and were members of the East Division of the Mid-American Conference. They finished the season 20–11, 12–4 in MAC play to finish in second place in the East Division. They lost in the semifinals of the MAC tournament to Ohio. The Bulls received an invite to the 2012 CollegeInsider.com Postseason Tournament, where they defeated American in the first round before losing to Oakland in the second round.

== Roster ==
Number	Name	Position	Height	Weight	Year	Hometown
1	Tony Watson	Guard	6–2	185	Junior	West Palm Beach, Florida
3	Jarod Oldham	Guard	6–3	185	Sophomore	Decatur, Illinois
4	Richie Sebuharara	Guard	6–1	160	Junior	Vestal, New York
5	Zach Filzen	Guard	6–3	185	Senior	Northfield, Minnesota
10	Corey Raley-Ross	Guard	6–3	190	Sophomore	Charlotte, North Carolina
12	Javon McCrea	Forward	6–7	245	Sophomore	Newark, New York
21	Mitchell Watt	Forward	6–10	225	Senior	Goodyear, Arizona
22	Auraum Nuiriankh	Guard/forward	6–5	200	Sophomore	Baltimore, Maryland
24	Dave Barnett	Guard/forward	6–5	215	Senior	East Aurora, New York
25	Xavier Ford	Forward	6–7	210	Freshman	Colorado Springs, Colorado
30	Titus Robinson	Forward	6–7	201	Senior	Charlotte, North Carolina
32	Raphell Thomas-Edwards	Forward	6–5	230	Freshman	Leicester, England
33	Cameron Downing	Center	6–9	260	Sophomore	Tulsa, Oklahoma
44	Will Regan	Forward	6–8	230	Sophomore	Williamsville, New York

== Schedule ==
Date time, TV	Rank^{#}	Opponent^{#}	Result	Record	Site (attendance) city, state
Regular season
11/11/2011*; 7:00 pm		Saint Peter's	W 72–65	1–0	Alumni Arena (2,623); Amherst, NY
11/16/2011; 7:00 pm		Cornell	W 68–59	2–0	Alumni Arena (1,731); Amherst, NY
11/19/2011*; 12:30 pm		at Princeton	L 53–61	2–1	Jadwin Gymnasium (1,715); Princeton, NJ
11/22/2011*; 7:00 pm		Canisius	W 94–59	3–1	Alumni Arena (2,122); Amherst, NY
11/30/2011*; 7:00 pm, FS Ohio		at Dayton	W 84–55	4–1	UD Arena (12,215); Dayton, OH
12/03/2011*; 7:00 pm		St. Bonaventure	L 60–66	4–2	Alumni Arena (3,882); Amherst, NY
12/07/2011*; 7:00 pm, TWCSN		at Niagara	W 82–74	5–2	Gallagher Center (2,061); Lewiston, NY
12/10/2011*; 7:00 pm, TWCSN		Youngstown State	W 80–72	6–2	Alumni Arena (1,611); Amherst, NY
12/20/2011*; 9:00 pm, BYUtv		at BYU	L 78–93	6–3	Marriott Center (9,632); Provo, UT
12/28/2011*; 7:00 pm		at Temple	L 85–87 ^{OT}	6–4	Liacouras Center (4,161); Philadelphia, PA
01/04/2012*; 7:00 pm		Buffalo State	W 111–59	7–4	Alumni Arena (719); Amherst, NY
01/07/2012; 7:00 pm, TWCSN		Kent State	W 66–65	8–4 (1–0)	Alumni Arena (2,386); Amherst, NY
01/11/2012; 7:00 pm		at Ohio	L 52–60	8–5 (1–1)	Convocation Center (6,284); Athens, OH
01/14/2012; 6:00 pm, STO		at Miami (OH)	L 51–52	8–6 (1–2)	Millett Hall (1,528); Oxford, OH
01/18/2012; 7:00 pm		Akron	W 82–70	9–6 (2–2)	Alumni Arena (3,095); Amherst, NY
01/21/2012; 4:00 pm		at Bowling Green	W 68–66	10–6 (3–2)	Stroh Center (2,120); Bowling Green, OH
01/24/2012; 7:00 pm, TWCSN		Eastern Michigan	W 65–47	11–6 (4–2)	Alumni Arena (2,154); Amherst, NY
01/28/2012; 11:00 am		at Northern Illinois	W 74–59	12–6 (5–2)	Convocation Center (1,427); DeKalb, IL
02/01/2012; 7:00 pm, TWCSN		Ball State	W 73–57	13–6 (6–2)	Alumni Arena (2,112); Amherst, NY
02/04/2012; 7:00 pm		at Toledo	W 72–65	14–6 (7–2)	Savage Arena (4,099); Toledo, OH
02/08/2012; 7:00 pm		at Central Michigan	W 66–62	15–6 (8–2)	McGuirk Arena (933); Mount Pleasant, MI
02/11/2012; 6:00 pm, STO		Western Michigan	W 59–57	16–6 (9–2)	Alumni Arena (4,561); Amherst, NY
02/14/2012; 7:00 pm, STO		at Kent State	L 71–76	16–7 (9–3)	Memorial Athletic and Convocation Center (2,622); Kent, OH
02/18/2012*; 1:00 pm, ESPNU		South Dakota State; ESPN BracketBusters	L 65–86	16–8	Frost Arena (5,378); Brookings, South Dakota
02/22/2012; 7:00 pm		Ohio	L 77–88	16–9 ((9–4))	Alumni Arena (2,925); Amherst, NY
02/25/2012; 3:00 pm		Miami (OH)	W 84–74	17–9 (10–4)	Alumni Arena (3,645); Amherst, NY
02/29/2012; 7:00 pm		at Akron	W 74–70	18–9 (11–4)	James A. Rhodes Arena (3,875); Akron, OH
03/03/2012; 2:00 pm, STO		Bowling Green	W 68–64	19–9 (12–4)	Alumni Arena (4,015); Amherst, NY
MAC tournament
03/09/2012; 9:30 pm, STO	(2)	vs. (3) Ohio; Semifinals	L 74–77	19–10	Quicken Loans Arena (8,513); Cleveland, OH
CollegeInsider.com tournament
03/14/2012*; 7:30 pm		at American; First round	W 78–61	20–10	Bender Arena (256); Washington, D.C.
03/17/2012*; 2:00 pm		at Oakland; Second round	L 76–84	20–11	Athletics Center O'rena (1,685); Rochester, MI
*Non-conference game. ^{#}Rankings from AP Poll. (#) Tournament seedings in parentheses. All times are in Eastern Time.
