= Javon Freeman-Liberty =

American basketball player (born 1999)

- Freeman-Liberty with Bursaspor in 2026

No. 4 – Bursaspor
- Position: Shooting guard / point guard
- League: Basketbol Süper Ligi

Personal information
- Born: October 20, 1999 (age 27) Chicago, Illinois, U.S.
- Listed height: 6 ft 3 in (1.91 m)
- Listed weight: 190 lb (86 kg)

Career information
- High school: Seton Academy (South Holland, Illinois); Whitney Young (Chicago, Illinois)
- College: Valparaiso (2018–2020); DePaul (2020–2022)
- NBA draft: 2022: undrafted
- Playing career: 2022–present

Career history
- 2022–2023: Windy City Bulls
- 2023–2024: Toronto Raptors
- 2023–2024: →Raptors 905
- 2024: Manisa Basket
- 2024–2025: Windy City Bulls
- 2025–2026: Brisbane Bullets
- 2026: Long Island Nets
- 2026: Montreal Alliance
- 2026–present: Bursaspor

Career highlights
- First-team All-MVC (2020); Second-team All-Big East (2022); 2× MVC All-Defensive Team (2019, 2020); MVC Most-Improved Team (2020); MVC All-Freshman Team (2019)
- Stats at NBA.com
- Stats at Basketball Reference

Javon Jaleen Freeman-Liberty (born October 20, 1999) is an American professional basketball player for Bursaspor of the Basketbol Süper Ligi (BSL). He played college basketball for the Valparaiso Crusaders and the DePaul Blue Demons.

== High school career ==
Freeman-Liberty began playing high school basketball for Seton Academy in South Holland, Illinois. After the school closed, he transferred to Whitney M. Young Magnet High School in Chicago, Illinois. As a junior, Freeman-Liberty averaged 13.6 points, 5.2 rebounds and 2.1 assists per game, helping his team win the Class 4A state title. In his senior season, he averaged about 20 points and six rebounds per game, leading Whitney Young back to the state title game. He committed to playing college basketball for Valparaiso over offers from VCU and Saint Louis, among others.

== College career ==
As a freshman at Valparaiso, Freeman-Liberty averaged 11 points and 4.3 rebounds per game, earning Missouri Valley Conference (MVC) All-Defensive and All-Freshman honors. On November 25, 2019, he posted a sophomore season-high 32 points, nine rebounds, four assists and four steals in an 81–77 overtime loss to Cincinnati. As a sophomore, Freeman-Liberty averaged 19 points, 6.1 rebounds, 3.2 assists and 2.2 steals per game, setting a program single-season record with 74 steals. He was selected to the All-MVC First Team, All-Defensive Team and Most-Improved Team.

Freeman-Liberty declared for the 2020 NBA draft before withdrawing and transferring to DePaul. He was granted immediate eligibility. In his junior season, he averaged 14.4 points, 5.3 rebounds and 2.6 assists per game. On November 20, 2021, Freeman-Liberty recorded a career-high 33 points and 11 rebounds in an 84–80 win over Western Illinois. On January 13, 2022, he aggravated a groin injury in a 96–92 victory over Seton Hall, forcing him to miss several games. Freeman-Liberty was named to the All-Big East Second Team.

== Professional career ==
=== Windy City Bulls (2022–2023) ===
After going undrafted in the 2022 NBA draft, Freeman-Liberty signed with the Chicago Bulls on July 7. He joined the Bulls for the 2022 NBA Summer League. He was waived by Chicago on October 8 and subsequently joined the Windy City Bulls of the NBA G League for the 2022–23 season. He appeared in 17 regular season games and averaged 18.4 points, 5.8 rebounds, 2.9 assists, 1.4 steals and 30.2 minutes.

Freeman-Liberty re-joined the Chicago Bulls for the 2023 NBA Summer League.

=== Toronto Raptors / Raptors 905 (2023–2024) ===
On July 22, 2023, Freeman-Liberty signed a two-way contract with the Toronto Raptors. On March 1, 2024, Toronto converted his two-way contract into a standard NBA contract after averaging 24 points, 6.9 rebounds, 4.3 assists and 1.5 steals per game with Raptors 905 during the 2023–24 NBA G League season. On April 9, 2024, he scored a career-high 20 points in a 140–123 loss to the Indiana Pacers.

Freeman-Liberty joined the Toronto Raptors for the 2024 NBA Summer League. On July 22, 2024, he was waived by the Raptors.

=== Manisa Basket (2024) ===
On September 18, 2024, Freeman-Liberty signed with Manisa Basket of the Turkish Basketbol Süper Ligi (BSL). He appeared in one BSL game and one BCL game before parting ways with Manisa on October 7.

=== Return to Windy City (2024–2025) ===
Freeman-Liberty signed with the Chicago Bulls on October 11, 2024, but was waived the next day. He subsequently joined the Windy City Bulls for the 2024–25 NBA G League season.

Freeman-Liberty joined the Chicago Bulls for the 2025 NBA Summer League.

=== Brisbane Bullets (2025–2026) ===
On August 1, 2025, Freeman-Liberty signed with the Brisbane Bullets of the Australian National Basketball League (NBL) for the 2025–26 season. After appearing in two games, he parted ways with the Bullets on October 9 in order to return home to recover from a hamstring injury and focus on his mental wellbeing. On November 18, the Bullets announced that Freeman-Liberty would returned to Brisbane and re-join the team for the rest of the season. He made his return appearance on December 11. On January 8, 2026, he was ruled out for at least four weeks with a hamstring injury. He was ruled out for the rest of the season on February 5. He made nine appearances for the Bullets.

=== Long Island Nets (2026) ===
On March 16, 2026, Freeman-Liberty was acquired off waivers by the Long Island Nets of the NBA G League.

=== Montreal Alliance (2026) ===
On May 14, 2026, Freeman-Liberty signed with the Montreal Alliance of the Canadian Elite Basketball League (CEBL).

=== Bursaspor Basketbol (2026–present) ===
On August 16, 2026, he signed with Bursaspor Basketbol of the Basketbol Süper Ligi (BSL).

== Career statistics ==
Legend
GP	Games played	GS	Games started	MPG	Minutes per game
FG%	Field goal percentage	3P%	3-point field goal percentage	FT%	Free throw percentage
RPG	Rebounds per game	APG	Assists per game	SPG	Steals per game
BPG	Blocks per game	PPG	Points per game	**Bold**	Career high

=== NBA ===
==== Regular season ====
Year	Team	GP	GS	MPG	FG%	3P%	FT%	RPG	APG	SPG	BPG	PPG
2023–24	Toronto	22	6	18.3	.444	.238	.917	3.2	1.8	.5	.2	7.0
Career		22	6	18.3	.444	.238	.917	3.2	1.8	.5	.2	7.0

=== College ===
Year	Team	GP	GS	MPG	FG%	3P%	FT%	RPG	APG	SPG	BPG	PPG
2018–19	Valparaiso	**33**	**33**	31.3	**.452**	.289	.693	4.3	2.0	1.8	**.4**	11.0
2019–20	Valparaiso	**33**	**33**	33.2	.436	.287	**.750**	6.1	**3.2**	**2.2**	.3	19.0
2020–21	DePaul	14	14	31.9	.427	.293	.740	5.3	2.6	1.5	.1	14.4
2021–22	DePaul	24	24	**34.9**	.430	**.368**	.739	**7.3**	**3.2**	1.7	.1	**21.7**
Career		104	104	32.8	.437	.312	.733	5.7	2.7	1.9	.2	16.5

== Personal life ==
Freeman-Liberty's uncle, Marcus Liberty, played four seasons in the NBA following a college career at Illinois.
