= 2012 CollegeInsider.com Postseason Tournament =

- Teams: 32
- Finals site: Smith Spectrum, Logan, Utah
- Champions: Mercer (1st title)
- Runner-up: Utah State (1st title game)
- Semifinalists: Fairfield (1st semifinal); Oakland (1st semifinal)
- Winning coach: Bob Hoffman (1st title)
- MVP: Langston Hall (Mercer)

The 2012 CollegeInsider.com Postseason Tournament (CIT) was a postseason single-elimination tournament of 32 NCAA Division I teams, up from 24 teams in the 2011 CIT. The CIT began with 16 first-round games. Games took place March 13–28, 2012.

Thirty-two participants who were not invited to the 2012 NCAA tournament, the 2012 National Invitation Tournament, or the 2012 College Basketball Invitational made up the field. The winner of the 2012 Great West Conference men's basketball tournament, North Dakota, received an automatic bid to the tournament.

All games, except for the championship game, were streamed online by America One Sports. Free registration was required to view the games. The championship game was once again broadcast nationally by Fox College Sports on FCS Central.

The tournament was won by Mercer who defeated Utah State in the championship game 70–67. This was the first post-season tournament win for a men's basketball team from the Atlantic Sun Conference.

== Participating teams ==
The following teams received an invitation to the 2012 CIT:

School	Conference	Overall record	Conference record
Albany	America East	19–14	9–7
American	Patriot	20–11	10–4
Bowling Green	Mid-American	16–15	9–7
Buffalo	Mid-American	19–10	12–4
Cal State Bakersfield	Division I independent	16–14	
Cal State Fullerton	Big West	21–9	12–4
Coastal Carolina	Big South	19–11	12–6
Drake	Missouri Valley	17–15	9–9
Fairfield	Metro Atlantic Athletic	19–14	12–6
Georgia State	Colonial Athletic	21–11	11–7
Idaho	Western Athletic	18–13	9–5
Indiana State	Missouri Valley	17–13	8–10
Kent State	Mid-American	21–11	10–6
Louisiana–Lafayette	Sun Belt	16–15	10–6
Loyola Marymount	West Coast	19–12	11–5
Manhattan	Metro Atlantic Athletic	20–12	12–6
McNeese State	Southland	17–15	10–6
Mercer	Atlantic Sun	22–11	13–5
North Dakota	Great West	17–14	6–4
Oakland	Summit League	17–15	11–7
Old Dominion	Colonial Athletic	20–13	13–5
Rice	Conference USA	17–15	8–8
Robert Morris	Northeast	24–10	13–5
Tennessee State	Ohio Valley	20–12	11–5
Tennessee Tech	Ohio Valley	19–13	9–7
Toledo	Mid-American	18–16	7–9
USC Upstate	Atlantic Sun	20–12	13–5
UC Santa Barbara	Big West	20–10	12–4
Utah State	Western Athletic	17–15	8–6
Utah Valley	Great West	20–12	9–1
Weber State	Big Sky	24–6	14–2
Yale	Ivy League	19–9	9–5

== Format ==
The fourth annual CIT used the old NIT model in which matchups in future rounds were determined by the results of the previous round.

== Bracket ==
Bracket is for visual purposes only. The CIT does not have a set bracket.

First round March 13–15
Tennessee Tech	43
Georgia State	74
Tennessee State	60
Mercer	68
Kent State	58
USC Upstate	73
Coastal Carolina	66
Old Dominion	68
Robert Morris	67
Indiana State	60
McNeese State	63
Toledo	76
Manhattan	89
Albany	79
Yale	56
Fairfield	68
North Dakota	64
Drake	70
Rice	68
Louisiana–Lafayette	63
Buffalo	78
American	61
Bowling Green	69
Oakland	86
Utah Valley	69
Weber State	72
Cal State Fullerton	79
Loyola Marymount	88
UC Santa Barbara	83
Idaho	86
Cal State Bakersfield	69
Utah State	75

Second round March 17 & 18
Georgia State	59
Mercer	64
USC Upstate	56
Old Dominion	65
Robert Morris	69
Toledo	51
Manhattan	57
Fairfield	69
Drake	68
Rice	74
Buffalo	76
Oakland	84
Weber State	78
Loyola Marymount	84*
Idaho	56
Utah State	76

Quarterfinals; March 20 & 21
Mercer	79
Old Dominion	73
Robert Morris	61
Fairfield	67
Rice	70
Oakland	77
Loyola Marymount	69
Utah State	77

Semifinals; March 24 & 25
Mercer	64
Fairfield	59
Oakland	81
Utah State	105

Championship; March 28
Mercer	70
Utah State	67

Home teams are listed second.
* Denotes overtime period
