= 2011–12 Bowling Green Falcons men's basketball team =

American college basketball season

2011–12 Bowling Green Falcons men's basketball

CIT, First Round
- Conference: Mid-American Conference
- East Division
- Record: 16–16 (9–7 MAC)
- Head coach: Louis Orr (5th season)
- Assistant coaches: LaMonta Stone; Louis Twigg; Dennis Hopson
- Home arena: Stroh Center

2011–12 Mid-American Conference men's basketball standings
	Conf.				Overall
Team	W		L	PCT	W		L	PCT
East
Akron	13	–	3	.813	22	–	12	.647
Buffalo	12	–	4	.750	20	–	11	.645
Ohio†	11	–	5	.688	29	–	8	.784
Kent State	10	–	6	.625	21	–	12	.636
Bowling Green	9	–	7	.563	16	–	16	.500
Miami	5	–	11	.313	9	–	21	.300
West
Eastern Michigan	9	–	7	.563	14	–	18	.438
Toledo	7	–	9	.438	19	–	17	.528
Western Michigan	6	–	10	.375	14	–	20	.412
Ball State	6	–	10	.375	15	–	15	.500
Central Michigan	5	–	11	.313	11	–	21	.344
Northern Illinois	3	–	13	.188	5	–	26	.161
† 2012 MAC tournament winner As of March 23, 2012; Rankings from AP Poll

The 2011–12 Bowling Green Falcons men's basketball team represented Bowling Green State University during the 2011–12 NCAA Division I men's basketball season. The Falcons, led by fifth year head coach Louis Orr, played their home games at the Stroh Center and are members of the East Division of the Mid-American Conference. They finished the season 16–16, 9–7 in MAC play to finish in fifth place in the East Division. They lost in the first round of the MAC Basketball tournament to Central Michigan. They were invited to the 2012 CollegeInsider.com Tournament where they lost in the first round to Oakland.

== Roster ==
Number	Name	Position	Height	Weight	Year	Hometown
1	Jordon Crawford	Guard	5–6	151	Junior	Cincinnati, Ohio
2	Anthony Henderson	Guard	6–1	168	Freshman	Toledo, Ohio
3	Luke Kraus	Guard	6–1	205	Junior	Findlay, Ohio
5	Desmont Rorie	Forward/Center	6–9	223	Freshman	Canton, Ohio
10	Scott Thomas	Forward	6–7	201	Senior	Ashley, Ohio
11	Damarkeo Lyshe	Guard	5–11	154	Freshman	Westerville, Ohio
12	James Erger	Forward	6–7	192	Junior	McKinney, Texas
15	A'uston Calhoun	Forward	6–7	232	Junior	Southfield, Michigan
20	Jehvon Clarke	Guard	6–1	176	Freshman	Canton, Ohio
21	Chauncey Orr	Guard/Forward	6–4	201	Freshman	Bowling Green, Ohio
22	Dee Brown	Guard	6–2	202	Senior	Detroit, Michigan
23	Craig Sealey	Forward	6–6	195	Sophomore	Columbus, Ohio
32	Torian Oglesby	Forward	6–7	206	Senior	Saginaw, Michigan
34	Antonio Ferrell, Jr.	Forward	6–5	236	Freshman	Springfield, Ohio
35	Cameron Black	Forward/Center	6–10	240	Sophomore	Kent, Ohio

== Schedule ==
Date time, TV	Rank^{#}	Opponent^{#}	Result	Record	Site (attendance) city, state
Exhibition
11/05/2011*; 2:00 pm		Tiffin	W 85–40		Stroh Center (1,295); Bowling Green, OH
Regular season
11/11/2011*; 7:00 pm, BCSN		Howard	W 63–48	1–0	Stroh Center (3,476); Bowling Green, OH
11/13/2011*; 6:00 pm, ESPNU		at Georgia; CBE Classic	L 54–63	1–1	Stegeman Coliseum (4,627); Athens, GA
11/21/2011*; 7:30 pm		Austin Peay; CBE Classic	W 82–72	2–1	Stroh Center (1,513); Bowling Green, OH
11/22/2011*; 7:30 pm		Detroit; CBE Classic	W 67–61	3–1	Stroh Center (1,379); Bowling Green, OH
11/23/2011*; 7:30 pm, BCSN		George Washington; CBE Classic	L 56–77	3–2	Stroh Center (1,392); Bowling Green, OH
11/27/2011*; 2:00 pm, BCSN		Temple	W 67–64	4–2	Stroh Center (1,268); Bowling Green, OH
12/04/2011*; 3:00 pm		at WKU	L 53–60	4–3	E. A. Diddle Arena (3,119); Bowling Green, KY
12/07/2011*; 7:00 pm		Malone	W 87–44	5–3	Stroh Center (1,350); Bowling Green, OH
12/10/2011*; 8:00 pm		at Valparaiso	L 79–82	5–4	Athletics–Recreation Center (3,667); Valparaiso, IN
12/17/2011*; 7:00 pm, BTN		at No. 21 Michigan State	L 60–74	5–5	Breslin Student Events Center (14,797); Lansing, MI
12/22/2011*; 7:30 pm		at FIU	W 61–53	6–5	U.S. Century Bank Arena (835); Miami, FL
12/28/2011*; 7:00 pm		at Duquesne	L 76–86	6–6	Palumbo Center (2,731); Pittsburgh, PA
01/01/2012*; 3:00 pm		at UTSA	L 79–86 ^{OT}	6–7	Convocation Center (1,021); San Antonio, TX
01/07/2012; 6:00 pm, STO		Ohio	W 67–57	7–7 (1–0)	Stroh Center (2,649); Bowling Green, OH
01/11/2012; 7:00 pm, BCSN		Akron	L 55–56	7–8 (1–1)	Stroh Center (2,263); Bowling Green, OH
01/14/2012; 7:00 pm		at Kent State	L 87–92	7–9 (1–2)	Memorial Athletic and Convocation Center (3,610); Kent, OH
01/18/2012; 7:00 pm		at Miami (OH)	W 65–57	8–9 (2–2)	Millett Hall (1,693); Oxford, OH
01/21/2012; 4:00 pm		Buffalo	L 66–68	8–10 (2–3)	Stroh Center (2,120); Bowling Green, OH
01/25/2012; 7:00 pm, BCSN		Central Michigan	W 71–58	9–10 (3–3)	Stroh Center (2,009); Bowling Green, OH
01/28/2012; 6:00 pm, STO		at Eastern Michigan	L 50–55	9–11 (3–4)	Convocation Center (1,150); Ypsilanti, MI
02/01/2012; 7:00 pm		at Western Michigan	W 72–48	10–11 (4–4)	University Arena (2,483); Kalamazoo, MI
02/04/2012; 6:00 pm, STO		Northern Illinois	W 65–40	11–11 (5–4)	Stroh Center (2,144); Bowling Green, OH
02/08/2012; 7:00 pm		at Ball State	W 61–54	12–11 (6–4)	John E. Worthen Arena (3,070); Muncie, IN
02/11/2012; 4:00 pm, BCSN		Toledo	W 66–63	13–11 (7–4)	Stroh Center (4,421); Bowling Green, OH
02/15/2012; 7:00 pm		at Ohio	L 59–72	13–12 (7–5)	Convocation Center (5,028); Athens, OH
02/18/2012*; 2:00 pm		Morehead State; ESPN BracketBusters	W 73–60	14–12	Stroh Center (1,763); Bowling Green, OH
02/22/2012; 7:00 pm		at Akron	L 68–79	14–13 (7–6)	James A. Rhodes Arena (3,234); Akron, OH
02/25/2012; 6:00 pm, STO		Kent State	W 74–58	15–13 (8–6)	Stroh Center (2,612); Bowling Green, OH
02/29/2012; 7:00 pm, BCSN		Miami (OH)	W 56–51	16–13 (9–6)	Stroh Center (2,556); Bowling Green, OH
03/03/2012; 6:00 pm, STO		at Buffalo	L 64–68	16–14 (9–7)	Alumni Arena (4,015); Amherst, NY
2012 MAC men's basketball tournament
03/05/2012; 7:00 pm		Central Michigan; First Round	L 53–54	16–15	Stroh Center (2,295); Bowling Green, OH
2012 CIT
03/14/2012*; 7:00 pm		at Oakland; First Round	L 69–86	16–16	Athletics Center O'rena (2,015); Rochester, MI
*Non-conference game. ^{#}Rankings from AP Poll. (#) Tournament seedings in parentheses. All times are in Eastern Time.
