= 2011–12 Toledo Rockets men's basketball team =

American college basketball season

2011–12 Toledo Rockets men's basketball

CIT, Second Round
- Conference: Mid-American Conference
- West Division
- Record: 19–17 (7–9 MAC)
- Head coach: Tod Kowalczyk (2nd season)
- Assistant coaches: Angret Thorpe; Jason Kalsow; Ryan Pedon
- Home arena: Savage Arena

2011–12 Mid-American Conference men's basketball standings
	Conf.				Overall
Team	W		L	PCT	W		L	PCT
East
Akron	13	–	3	.813	22	–	12	.647
Buffalo	12	–	4	.750	20	–	11	.645
Ohio†	11	–	5	.688	29	–	8	.784
Kent State	10	–	6	.625	21	–	12	.636
Bowling Green	9	–	7	.563	16	–	16	.500
Miami	5	–	11	.313	9	–	21	.300
West
Eastern Michigan	9	–	7	.563	14	–	18	.438
Toledo	7	–	9	.438	19	–	17	.528
Western Michigan	6	–	10	.375	14	–	20	.412
Ball State	6	–	10	.375	15	–	15	.500
Central Michigan	5	–	11	.313	11	–	21	.344
Northern Illinois	3	–	13	.188	5	–	26	.161
† 2012 MAC tournament winner As of March 23, 2012; Rankings from AP Poll

The 2011–12 Toledo Rockets men's basketball team represented the University of Toledo during the 2011–12 NCAA Division I men's basketball season. The Rockets, led by second-year head coach Tod Kowalczyk, played their home games at Savage Arena and are members of the West Division of the Mid-American Conference. They finished the season 19–17, 7–9 in MAC play to finish in second place in the West Division. They lost in the quarterfinals of the MAC tournament to Ohio. They were invited to the 2012 CollegeInsider.com Tournament, where they defeated McNeese State in the first round before falling to Robert Morris in the second round.

== Roster ==
Number	Name	Position	Height	Weight	Year	Hometown
0	James Ewing	Forward	6–6	240	Sophomore	Buffalo, New York
1	Dominique Buckley	Guard	6–2	200	Junior	Romulus, Michigan
3	A.J. Mathew	Guard	6–3	185	Freshman	Ypsilanti, Michigan
4	Ryan Majerle	Guard	6–4	180	Freshman	Belmont, Michigan
5	Rian Pearson	Guard	6–4	190	Sophomore	Raytown, Missouri
12	Zack Riddle	Guard	6–1	180	Freshman	Dublin, Ohio
15	Michael Speicher	Forward	6–6	195	Freshman	Steinhausen, Switzerland
20	Julius Brown	Guard	5–10	165	Freshman	Markham, Illinois
21	DeLino Dear	Forward/Center	6–9	205	Sophomore	McKinney, Texas
32	Reese Holliday	Forward	6–4	220	Sophomore	Kansas City, Kansas
33	Curtis Dennis	Guard	6–5	195	Junior	Bronx, New York
43	Matt Smith	Forward	6–7	215	Sophomore	Whitewright, Texas
55	Richard Wonnell	Center	6–10	240	Sophomore	Detroit, Michigan

== Schedule ==
Date time, TV	Rank^{#}	Opponent^{#}	Result	Record	Site (attendance) city, state
Exhibition
November 3, 2011*; 7:00 pm		Northwestern Ohio	W 88–62	—	Savage Arena; Toledo, OH
Regular season
November 18, 2011*; 5:30 pm		vs. Texas State; UTPA Tip-Off Classic	L 91–94	0–1	UTPA Fieldhouse (142); Edinburg, TX
November 19, 2011*; 5:30 pm		vs. USC Upstate; UTPA Tip-Off Classic	W 75–70	1–1	UTPA Fieldhouse (347); Edinburg, TX
November 20, 2011*; 8:00 pm		at Texas–Pan American; UTPA Tip-Off Classic	W 64–54	2–1	UTPA Fieldhouse (237); Edinburg, TX
November 21, 2011*; 8:00 pm		vs. Victory; UTPA Tip-Off Classic	W 90–47	3–1	UTPA Fieldhouse (106); Edinburg, TX
November 26, 2011*; 7:30 pm		UIC	W 82–67	4–1	Savage Arena (4,093); Toledo, OH
November 30, 2011*; 7:00 pm		UNC Wilmington	W 75–73	5–1	Savage Arena (3,785); Toledo, OH
December 3, 2011*; 3:00 pm		at Chicago State	W 73–61	6–1	Emil and Patricia Jones Convocation Center (435); Chicago, IL
December 7, 2011*; 7:00 pm		Temple	L 58–77	6–2	Savage Arena (4,353); Toledo, OH
December 10, 2011*; 3:00 pm		Loyola Chicago	L 55–57	6–3	Savage Arena (4,279); Toledo, OH
December 17, 2011*; 7:00 pm		Youngstown State	W 86–77	7–3	Savage Arena (4,661); Toledo, OH
December 20, 2011*; 7:00 pm		Norfolk State	L 70–72	7–4	Savage Arena (3,781); Toledo, OH
December 22, 2011*; 7:00 pm		at Florida Gulf Coast	L 80–83	7–5	Alico Arena (1,314); Fort Myers, FL
December 28, 2011*; 8:00 pm		Cleveland State	L 64–72	7–6	Savage Arena (4,032); Toledo, OH
January 3, 2012*; 8:00 pm		IU Northwest	W 107–43	8–6	Savage Arena (3,652); Toledo, OH
January 7, 2012; 7:00 pm		at Central Michigan	W 67–57	8–7 (0–1)	McGuirk Arena (2,649); Mount Pleasant, MI
January 10, 2012; 7:00 pm, STO		Ball State	L 68–70	8–8 (0–2)	Savage Arena (4,079); Toledo, OH
January 14, 2012; 2:00 pm		at Western Michigan	L 52–74	8–9 (0–3)	University Arena (2,538); Kalamazoo, MI
January 18, 2012; 7:00 pm		Northern Illinois	W 71–41	9–9 (1–3)	Savage Arena (4,015); Toledo, OH
January 21, 2012; 2:00 pm		at Eastern Michigan	L 38–41	9–10 (1–4)	Convocation Center (1,009); Ypsilanti, MI
January 25, 2012; 7:00 pm		at Miami (OH)	W 63–61	10–10 (2–4)	Millett Hall (1,192); Oxford, OH
January 28, 2012; 7:00 pm		Kent State	L 61–77	10–11 (2–5)	Savage Arena (4,720); Toledo, OH
Feabruary 1, 2012; 7:00 pm, STO		at Akron	L 72–86	10–12 (2–6)	James A. Rhodes Arena (3,037); Akron, OH
February 4, 2012; 7:00 pm		Buffalo	L 65–72	10–13 (2–7)	Savage Arena (4,099); Toledo, OH
February 8, 2012; 7:00 pm		Ohio	W 77–73	11–13 (3–7)	Savage Arena (4,139); Toledo, OH
February 11, 2012; 4:00 pm		at Bowling Green	L 63–66	11–14 (3–8)	Stroh Center (4,421); Bowling Green, OH
February 15, 2012; 7:00 pm		at Ball State	W 63–55	12–14 (4–8)	John E. Worthen Arena (3,144); Muncie, IN
February 18, 2012*; 3:00 pm		at Sam Houston State; ESPN BracketBusters	W 59–58	13–14	Bernard Johnson Coliseum (1,763); Huntsville, TX
February 22, 2012; 7:00 pm		Central Michigan	W 72–67	14–14 (5–8)	Savage Arena (3,895); Toledo, OH
February 25, 2012; 7:00 pm		Western Michigan	W 83–74	15–14 (6–8)	Savage Arena (5,108); Toledo, OH
February 29, 2012; 8:00 pm		at Northern Illinois	L 61–65	15–15 (6–9)	Convocation Center (996); DeKalb, IL
March 3, 2012; 2:00 pm		Eastern Michigan	W 76–51	16–15 (7–9)	Savage Arena (4,764); Toledo, OH
MAC tournament
March 5, 2012; 7:00 pm	(7)	(10) Miami (OH); First Round	W 60–53	17–15	Savage Arena (2,295); Toledo, OH
March 7, 2012; 9:30 pm, STO	(7)	vs. (11) Central Michigan; Second Round	W 75–72	18–15	Quicken Loans Arena (2,523); Cleveland, OH
March 8, 2012; 9:30 pm, STO	(7)	vs. (3) Ohio; Quarterfinals	L 57–65	18–16	Quicken Loans Arena (3,351); Cleveland, OH
CollegeInsider.com tournament
March 13, 2012*; 7:00 pm		McNeese State; First Round	W 76–63	19–16	Savage Arena (1,140); Toledo, OH
March 17, 2012*; 2:00 pm		Robert Morris; Second Round	L 51–69	19–17	Savage Arena (1,321); Toledo, OH
*Non-conference game. ^{#}Rankings from AP Poll. (#) Tournament seedings in parentheses. All times are in Eastern Time.
