= 2011–12 Akron Zips men's basketball team =

American college basketball season

2011–12 Akron Zips men's basketball
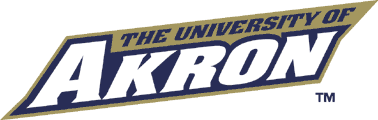

MAC East Division Champions MAC Regular Season Champions

NIT, First Round
- Conference: Mid-American Conference
- East Division
- Record: 22–12 (13–3 MAC)
- Head coach: Keith Dambrot (8th season)
- Assistant coaches: Rick McFadden; Charles Thomas; Terry Weigand
- Home arena: James A. Rhodes Arena

2011–12 Mid-American Conference men's basketball standings
| | Conf. | | | | Overall |
| Team | W | | L | PCT | W | | L | PCT |
|---|---|---|---|---|---|---|---|---|
East
| Akron | 13 | – | 3 | .813 | 22 | – | 12 | .647 |
| Buffalo | 12 | – | 4 | .750 | 20 | – | 11 | .645 |
| Ohio† | 11 | – | 5 | .688 | 29 | – | 8 | .784 |
| Kent State | 10 | – | 6 | .625 | 21 | – | 12 | .636 |
| Bowling Green | 9 | – | 7 | .563 | 16 | – | 16 | .500 |
| Miami | 5 | – | 11 | .313 | 9 | – | 21 | .300 |
West
| Eastern Michigan | 9 | – | 7 | .563 | 14 | – | 18 | .438 |
| Toledo | 7 | – | 9 | .438 | 19 | – | 17 | .528 |
| Western Michigan | 6 | – | 10 | .375 | 14 | – | 20 | .412 |
| Ball State | 6 | – | 10 | .375 | 15 | – | 15 | .500 |
| Central Michigan | 5 | – | 11 | .313 | 11 | – | 21 | .344 |
| Northern Illinois | 3 | – | 13 | .188 | 5 | – | 26 | .161 |
† 2012 MAC tournament winner As of March 23, 2012; Rankings from AP Poll

The 2011–12 Akron Zips men's basketball team represented the University of Akron during the 2011–12 NCAA Division I men's basketball season. The Zips, led by eighth year head coach Keith Dambrot, played their home games at James A. Rhodes Arena and were members of the East Division of the Mid-American Conference. The Zips finished the season 22–12, 13–3 in MAC play to finish as East Division champions and overall regular season champions. Akron failed to win the MAC tournament losing in the championship game to Ohio. As regular season champions, the Zips received an automatic bid into the National Invitation Tournament where they lost in the first round to Northwestern.

== Roster ==
| Number | Name | Position | Height | Weight | Year | Hometown |
|---|---|---|---|---|---|---|
| 1 | Demetrius Treadwell | Forward | 6–7 | 225 | Sophomore | Euclid, Ohio |
| 2 | Brian Walsh | Guard | 6–5 | 200 | Junior | Coraopolis, Pennsylvania |
| 3 | Luke Avsec | Guard | 5–10 | 180 | Sophomore | Cleveland, Ohio |
| 4 | Deji Ibitayo | Guard | 6–3 | 205 | Freshman | Country Club Hills, Illinois |
| 5 | Brett McClanahan | Guard | 6–4 | 205 | Senior | Nitro, West Virginia |
| 10 | Nick Harney | Forward | 6–7 | 210 | Sophomore | Cleveland, Ohio |
| 11 | Alex Abreu | Guard | 5–10 | 175 | Sophomore | Bayamón, Puerto Rico |
| 12 | Kyle Petersen | Guard | 6–4 | 190 | Senior | Naples, Florida |
| 13 | Nikola Cvetinović | Forward | 6–8 | 230 | Senior | Loznica, Serbia |
| 14 | Blake Justice | Guard | 6–3 | 195 | Freshman | Peebles, Ohio |
| 15 | C.J. Oldham | Forward | 6–5 | 190 | Sophomore | Solon, Ohio |
| 22 | Quincy Diggs | Forward | 6–6 | 215 | Junior | Wichita, Kansas |
| 23 | Chauncey Gilliam | Forward | 6–5 | 230 | Junior | Columbia, Maryland |
| 32 | Michael Green | Forward | 6-6 | 230 | Freshman | Dublin, Ohio |
| 33 | Josh Egner | Forward | 6–7 | 215 | Sophomore | Massillon, Ohio |
| 44 | Zeke Marshall | Center | 7–0 | 235 | Junior | McKeesport, Pennsylvania |

== Schedule ==
| Date time, TV | Rank^{#} | Opponent^{#} | Result | Record | Site (attendance) city, state |
Exhibition
| 11/03/2011*; 7:00 pm | | John Carroll | W 84–62 | | James A. Rhodes Arena (2,734); Akron, OH |
Regular season
| 11/09/2011*; 6:00 pm, ESPNU | | at Mississippi State; 2K Sports Classic | W 68–58 | 1–0 | Humphrey Coliseum (6,897); Starkville, MS |
| 11/12/2011*; 7:00 pm | | Hiram; 2K Sports Classic | W 95–65 | 2–0 | James A. Rhodes Arena (3,292); Akron, OH |
| 11/18/2011*; 7:30 pm | | at Valparaiso; 2K Sports Classic | L 59–62 | 2–1 | Athletics–Recreation Center (3,876); Valparaiso, IN |
| 11/19/2011*; 5:00 pm | | vs. Duquesne; 2K Sports Classic | L 76–81 | 2–2 | Athletics–Recreation Center (2,244); Valparaiso, IN |
| 11/26/2011*; 7:00 pm | | Detroit | W 81–63 | 3–2 | James A. Rhodes Arena (2,585); Akron, OH |
| 11/28/2011*; 7:00 pm, ESPN3 | | at West Virginia | L 56–77 | 3–3 | WVU Coliseum (7,334); Morgantown, WV |
| 12/04/2011*; 2:00 pm | | at Middle Tennessee | L 53–77 | 3–4 | Murphy Center (3,298); Murfreesboro, TN |
| 12/10/2011*; 2:00 pm | | at Cleveland State | L 66–69 | 3–5 | Wolstein Center (4,739); Cleveland, OH |
| 12/15/2011*; 7:00 pm | | Arkansas-Pine Bluff | W 87–64 | 4–5 | James A. Rhodes Arena (2,073); Akron, OH |
| 12/17/2011*; 4:00 pm | | Florida A&M | W 91–69 | 5–5 | James A. Rhodes Arena (2,425); Akron, OH |
| 12/19/2011*; 8:00 pm | | Youngstown State | W 88–62 | 6–5 | James A. Rhodes Arena (2,408); Akron, OH |
| 12/21/2011*; 7:00 pm | | North Carolina A&T | W 79–52 | 7–5 | James A. Rhodes Arena (2,909); Akron, OH |
| 12/29/2011*; 7:00 pm | | VCU | L 75–76 ^{OT} | 7–6 | James A. Rhodes Arena (3,993); Akron, OH |
| 01/01/2012*; 5:00 pm | | at Marshall | W 67–51 | 8–6 | Cam Henderson Center (6,063); Huntington, WV |
| 01/07/2012; 7:00 pm, ONN | | at Miami (OH) | W 65–60 | 9–6 (1–0)) | Millett Hall (1,513); Oxford, OH |
| 01/11/2012; 7:00 pm | | at Bowling Green | W 56–55 | 10–6 (2–0) | Stroh Center (2,263); Bowling Green, OH |
| 01/14/2012; 4:00 pm, ESPNU | | Ohio | W 68–63 | 11–6 (3–0) | James A. Rhodes Arena (4,661); Akron, OH |
| 01/18/2012; 7:00 pm, TWCSN | | at Buffalo | L 70–82 | 11–7 (3–1) | Alumni Arena (5,924); Amherst, NY |
| 01/21/2012; 6:00 pm, STO | | Kent State | W 84–75 | 12–7 (4–1) | James A. Rhodes Arena (5,252); Akron, OH |
| 01/24/2012; 7:00 pm, STO | | at Ball State | W 70–58 | 13–7 (5–1) | John E. Worthen Arena (3,757); Muncie, IN |
| 01/28/2012; 7:00 pm | | at Central Michigan | W 74–64 | 14–7 (6–1) | McGuirk Arena (1,787); Mount Pleasant, MI |
| 02/01/2012; 7:00 pm, STO | | Toledo | W 86–72 | 15–7 (7–1) | James A. Rhodes Arena (3,037); Akron, OH |
| 02/04/2012; 7:30 pm | | Eastern Michigan | W 77–47 | 16–7 (8–1) | James A. Rhodes Arena (4,234); Akron, OH |
| 02/08/2012; 7:00 pm, STO | | at Western Michigan | W 69–66 ^{OT} | 17–7 (9–1) | University Arena (2,416); Kalamazoo, MI |
| 02/11/2012; 7:30 pm | | Northern Illinois | W 75–51 | 18–7 (10–1) | James A. Rhodes Arena (4,378); Akron, OH |
| 02/15/2012; 7:00 pm | | Miami (OH) | W 74–59 | 19–7 (11–1) | James A. Rhodes Arena (3,237); Akron, OH |
| 02/18/2012*; 2:00 pm, ESPN2 | | at Oral Roberts; ESPN BracketBusters | L 61–67 | 19–8 | Mabee Center (7,745); Tulsa, OK |
| 02/22/2012; 7:00 pm | | at Bowling Green | W 79–68 | 20–8 (12–1) | James A. Rhodes Arena (3,234); Akron, OH |
| 02/25/2012; 8:00 pm, ESPNU | | at Ohio | L 61–85 | 20–9 (12–2) | Convocation Center (8,018); Athens, OH |
| 02/29/2012; 7:00 pm | | Buffalo | L 70–74 | 20–10 (12–3) | James A. Rhodes Arena (3,875); Akron, OH |
| 03/02/2012; 7:00 pm, ESPN2 | | at Kent State | W 61–55 | 21–10 (13–3) | Memorial Athletic and Convocation Center (6,335); Kent, OH |
MAC tournament
| 03/09/2012; 7:00 pm, STO | (1) | vs. (4) Kent State; Semifinals | W 78–74 | 22–10 | Quicken Loans Arena (8,513); Cleveland, OH |
| 03/10/2012; 8:00 pm, ESPN2 | (1) | vs. (3) Ohio; Championship | L 63–64 | 22–11 | Quicken Loans Arena (10,301); Cleveland, OH |
NIT
| 03/13/2012*; 9:00 pm, ESPN2 | (5) | at (4) Northwestern; First round | L 74–76 | 22–12 | Welsh-Ryan Arena (2,319); Evanston, IL |
*Non-conference game. ^{#}Rankings from AP Poll. (#) Tournament seedings in parentheses. All times are in Eastern Time.
