= 2011–12 Ohio Bobcats men's basketball team =

American college basketball season

2011–12 Ohio Bobcats men's basketball

MAC Tournament Champions

NCAA Tournament, Sweet Sixteen
- Conference: Mid-American Conference
- East Division

Ranking
- Coaches: No. 25
- Record: 29–8 (11–5 MAC)
- Head coach: John Groce (4th season)
- Assistant coaches: Dustin Ford; Jamall Walker; Ramon Williams
- Home arena: Convocation Center

2011–12 Mid-American Conference men's basketball standings
	Conf.				Overall
Team	W		L	PCT	W		L	PCT
East
Akron	13	–	3	.813	22	–	12	.647
Buffalo	12	–	4	.750	20	–	11	.645
Ohio†	11	–	5	.688	29	–	8	.784
Kent State	10	–	6	.625	21	–	12	.636
Bowling Green	9	–	7	.563	16	–	16	.500
Miami	5	–	11	.313	9	–	21	.300
West
Eastern Michigan	9	–	7	.563	14	–	18	.438
Toledo	7	–	9	.438	19	–	17	.528
Western Michigan	6	–	10	.375	14	–	20	.412
Ball State	6	–	10	.375	15	–	15	.500
Central Michigan	5	–	11	.313	11	–	21	.344
Northern Illinois	3	–	13	.188	5	–	26	.161
† 2012 MAC tournament winner As of March 23, 2012; Rankings from AP Poll

The 2011–12 Ohio Bobcats men's basketball team represented Ohio University during the 2011–12 NCAA Division I men's basketball season. The Bobcats, led by fourth year head coach John Groce, played their home games at the Convocation Center and are members of the East Division of the Mid-American Conference. They finished the season 29–8, 11–5 in MAC play to finish in third place in the East Division. They were champions of the MAC Basketball tournament and earned an automatic bid into the 2012 NCAA tournament where the 13th seeded Bobcats defeated Michigan in the second round and South Florida in the third round to advance to school's first Sweet Sixteen since 1964. They lost in the Sweet Sixteen to top-seed North Carolina in overtime. After the season Groce accepted the head coach position at Illinois

== Roster ==
2011–12 Ohio Bobcats men's basketball team
Players
Coaches

Pos.	#	Name	Height	Weight	Year	Hometown
G	2	Nick Goff	6 ft 4 in (1.93 m)	180 lb (82 kg)	So	Columbus, Ohio
G	3	Walter Offutt	6 ft 3 in (1.91 m)	190 lb (86 kg)	Jr	Indianapolis, Indiana
G	4	David McKinley	5 ft 9 in (1.75 m)	156 lb (71 kg)	Jr	Dublin, Ohio
G	5	D. J. Cooper	5 ft 11 in (1.8 m)	165 lb (75 kg)	Jr	Chicago, Illinois
F	13	T. J. Hall	6 ft 6 in (1.98 m)	210 lb (95 kg)	So	Gainesville, Florida
G	15	Nick Kellogg	6 ft 3 in (1.91 m)	185 lb (84 kg)	So	Westerville, Ohio
G	20	Ricardo Johnson	6 ft 4 in (1.93 m)	190 lb (86 kg)	So	Covington, Kentucky
F	21	Jon Smith	6 ft 7 in (2.01 m)	190 lb (86 kg)	So	Columbus, Ohio
G	22	Stevie Taylor	5 ft 9 in (1.75 m)	150 lb (68 kg)	Fr	Gahanna, Ohio
F	23	Ivo Baltic	6 ft 8 in (2.03 m)	214 lb (97 kg)	Jr	Kansas City, Missouri
F	30	Reggie Keely	6 ft 8 in (2.03 m)	263 lb (119 kg)	Jr	University Heights, Ohio
F	32	TyQuane Goard	6 ft 7 in (2.01 m)	195 lb (88 kg)	Fr	Charleston, West Virginia
F/C	45	Kenny Belton	6 ft 8 in (2.03 m)	280 lb (127 kg)	Sr	Greensboro, North Carolina
C	53	Ethan Jacobs	6 ft 10 in (2.08 m)	220 lb (100 kg)	So	Tipton, Indiana

Head coach

John Groce

Assistant coach(es)

Jamall Walker
Ramon Williams
Dustin Ford

Legend

- (C) Team captain
- (S) Suspended
- (I) Ineligible
- (W) Walk-on
- Injured
- Current redshirt

Roster
Last update: 2014-03-18

== Coaching staff ==
Name	Position	College	Graduating year
John Groce	Head coach	Taylor University	1994
Jamall Walker	Assistant coach	Saint Louis University	2000
Dustin Ford	Assistant coach	Ohio University	2001
Ramon Williams	Assistant coach	Virginia Military Institute	1990

== Preseason ==
The preseason coaches' poll and league awards were announced by the league office on October 28, 2015. Ohio was picked third in the MAC East.

=== Preseason poll ===
(First place votes in parentheses)

==== East Division ====
1. Kent State 132 (16)
2. Akron 104 (8)
3. Ohio 94
4. Miami 80
5. Buffalo 62
6. Bowling Green 32

==== West Division ====
1. Western Michigan 128 (14)
2. Ball State 111 (9)
3. Central Michigan 92 (1)
4. Toledo 76
5. Northern Illinois 59
6. Eastern Michigan 38

==== Tournament champs ====
Kent State (12), Akron (6), Ball State (3), Western Michigan (2), Central Michigan (1)

=== Preseason All-MAC ===
Preseason All-MAC teams
Team	Player	Position	Year
Preseason All-MAC East	DJ Cooper	G	Jr.

== Schedule ==
Date time, TV	Rank^{#}	Opponent^{#}	Result	Record	Site (attendance) city, state
Exhibition
11/07/2011*; 7:00 pm		Mercyhurst	W 82–63		Convocation Center (3,314); Athens, OH
Regular Season
11/13/2011*; 2:00 pm		UT Martin; Global Sports Invitational	W 74–65	1–0	Convocation Center (3,835); Athens, OH
11/15/2011*; 7:00 pm		Lamar; Global Sports Invitational	W 85–78 ^{OT}	2–0	Convocation Center (3,672); Athens, OH
11/20/2011*; 2:00 pm		Arkansas State; Global Sports Invitational	W 69–54	3–0	Convocation Center (3,455); Athens, OH
11/25/2011*; 7:00 pm, ESPN3		at No. 7 Louisville; Global Sports Invitational	L 54–59	3–1	KFC Yum! Center (21,334); Louisville, KY
11/30/2011*; 7:00 pm		at Marshall	W 70–68	4–1	Cam Henderson Center (7,061); Huntington, WV
12/03/2011*; 2:00 pm		Morgan State	W 61–53	5–1	Convocation Center (2,768); Athens, OH
12/07/2011*; 7:00 pm		at Oakland	W 84–82	6–1	Athletics Center O'rena (2,175); Rochester, MI
12/30/2011*; 10:00 pm		at Portland	W 72–54	7–1	Chiles Center (2,002); Portland, OR
12/14/2011*; 7:00 pm		Marietta College	W 88–54	8–1	Convocation Center (8,672); Athens, OH
12/17/2011*; 7:00 pm, WBDT		at Wright State	W 82–54	9–1	Nutter Center (3,749); Dayton, OH
12/20/2011*; 8:00 pm		at Northern Iowa	W 76–59	10–1	McLeod Center (3,486); Cedar Fals, IA
12/23/2011*; 7:00 pm		North Carolina A&T	W 82–66	11–1	Convocation Center (4,255); Athens, OH
12/30/2011*; 7:00 pm		Kennesaw State	W 71–63	12–1	Convocation Center (5,863); Athens, OH
01/02/2012*; 7:00 pm		Robert Morris	L 67–70	12–2	Convocation Center (6,018); Athens, OH
MAC regular season
01/07/2012; 6:00 pm, STO		at Bowling Green	L 57–67	12–3 (0–1)	Stroh Center (2,649); Bowling Green, OH
01/11/2012; 7:00 pm		Buffalo	W 60–52	13–3 (1–1)	Convocation Center (6,284); Athens, OH
01/14/2012; 4:00 pm, ESPNU		at Akron	L 63–68	13–4 (1–2)	James A. Rhodes Arena (4,661); Akron, OH
01/18/2012; 7:00 pm, STO		Kent State	W 87–65	14–4 (2–2)	Convocation Center (5,924); Athens, OH
01/21/2012; 2:00 pm		Miami (OH)	W 69–65	15–4 (3–2)	Convocation Center (13,011); Athens, OH
01/25/2012; 7:00 pm, STO		Western Michigan	W 56–51	16–4 (4–2)	Convocation Center (4,638); Athens, OH
01/28/2012; 11:00 am, ESPNU		Ball State	W 59–55	17–4 (5–2)	Convocation Center (6,018); Athens, OH
02/01/2012; 8:00 pm		at Northern Illinois	W 67–58	18–4 (6–2)	Convocation Center (784); DeKalb, IL
02/04/2012; 2:00 pm		Central Michigan	W 68–42	19–4 (7–2)	Convocation Center (7,581); Athens, OH
02/08/2012; 7:00 pm		at Toledo	L 73–77	19–5 (7–3)	Savage Arena (4,139); Toledo, OH
02/11/2012; 4:30 pm		at Eastern Michigan	L 55–68	19–6 (7–4)	Convocation Center (1,473); Ypsilanti, MI
02/15/2012; 7:00 pm		Bowling Green	W 72–59	20–6 (8–4)	Convocation Center (5,028); Athens, OH
02/18/2012*; 7:00 pm, ESPN3		UNC Asheville; ESPN BracketBusters	W 81–62	21–6	Convocation Center (9,961); Athens, OH
02/22/2012; 7:00 pm		at Buffalo	W 88–77	22–6 (9–4)	Alumni Arena (2,925); Amherst, NY
02/26/2012; 8:00 pm, ESPNU		Akron	W 85–61	23–6 (10–4)	Convocation Center (8,018); Athens, OH
02/29/2012; 7:00 pm		at Kent State	L 61–68	23–7 (10–5)	Memorial Athletic and Convocation Center (2,965); Kent, OH
03/03/2012; 12:00 pm		at Miami (OH)	W 63–54	24–7 (11–5)	Millett Hall (1,683); Oxford, OH
MAC tournament
03/08/2012; 9:30 pm, STO	(3)	vs. (7) Toledo; Quarterfinals	W 65–57	25–7	Quicken Loans Arena (3,351); Cleveland, OH
03/09/2012; 9:30 pm, STO	(3)	vs. (2) Buffalo; Semifinals	W 77–74	26–7	Quicken Loans Arena (8,513); Cleveland, OH
03/10/2012; 8:00 pm, ESPN2	(3)	vs. (1) Akron; Championship Game	W 64–63	27–7	Quicken Loans Arena (10,301); Cleveland, OH
NCAA tournament
03/16/2012*; 7:20 pm, TNT	(13)	vs. (4) No. 13 Michigan; First Round	W 65–60	28–7	Bridgestone Arena (11,625); Nashville, TN
03/18/2012*; 7:10 pm, TBS	(13)	vs. (12) South Florida; Second Round	W 62–56	29–7	Bridgestone Arena (11,033); Nashville, TN
03/23/2012*; 7:47 pm, TBS	(13)	vs. (1) No. 4 North Carolina; Sweet Sixteen	L 65–73 ^{OT}	29–8	Edward Jones Dome (21,471); St. Louis, MO
*Non-conference game. ^{#}Rankings from AP Poll. (#) Tournament seedings in parentheses. All times are in Eastern Time (#) during NCAA Tournament is seed with Region.

== Statistics ==
=== Team statistics ===
Final 2011–12 statistics

Record	Ohio	OPP
Scoring	2597	2311
Scoring Average	70.19	62.46
Field goals – Att	901–2107	775–1880
3-pt. Field goals – Att	278–809	198–673
Free throws – Att	517–749	563–787
Rebounds	1136	1297
Assists	488	415
Turnovers	481	644
Steals	347	221
Blocked Shots	103	127

=== Player statistics ===
						Minutes		Scoring		Total FGs			3-point FGs			Free-Throws			Rebounds					
Player	GP	GS	Tot	Avg	Pts	Avg	FG	FGA	Pct	3FG	3FA	Pct	FT	FTA	Pct	Off	Def	Tot	Avg	A	PF	TO	Stl	Blk
D.J. Cooper	37	37	1199	32.4	545	14.7	162	465	0.348	75	244	0.307	146	196	0.745	28	109	137	3.7	211	51	106	85	3
Walter Offutt	37	37	1088	29.4	457	12.4	148	329	0.45	53	139	0.381	108	152	0.711	48	86	134	3.6	65	94	62	57	4
Reggie Keely	37	3	792	21.4	334	9	128	251	0.51	0	1	0	78	113	0.69	82	100	182	4.9	18	100	70	22	15
Nick Kellogg	37	36	1019	27.5	332	9	106	236	0.449	85	199	0.427	35	39	0.897	7	68	75	2	39	70	30	40	4
Ivo Baltic	37	34	1015	27.4	323	8.7	137	293	0.468	5	18	0.278	44	86	0.512	49	137	186	5	55	100	71	34	13
Stevie Taylor	37	0	422	11.4	162	4.4	59	170	0.347	31	102	0.304	13	22	0.591	8	33	41	1.1	38	40	32	28	1
T.J. Hall	37	1	443	12	140	3.8	49	147	0.333	23	80	0.288	19	30	0.633	27	50	77	2.1	14	71	25	17	7
Jon Smith	37	36	724	19.6	132	3.6	51	82	0.622	0	0	0	30	44	0.682	84	82	166	4.5	17	90	39	23	44
Ricardo Johnson	36	1	487	13.5	113	3.1	36	82	0.439	5	20	0.25	36	55	0.655	33	54	87	2.4	22	72	26	32	6
TyQuane Goard	29	0	208	7.2	48	1.7	20	39	0.513	0	1	0	8	11	0.727	21	24	45	1.6	6	26	12	8	6
Nick Goff	9	0	13	1.4	5	0.6	2	5	0.4	1	3	0.333	0	0	0	1	1	2	0.2	1	2	2	0	0
Kenny Belton	3	0	3	1	4	1.3	2	2	1	0	0	0	0	1	0	1	0	1	0.3	0	0	0	0	0
Ethan Jacobs	13	0	22	1.7	2	0.2	1	4	0.25	0	0	0	0	0	0	1	1	2	0.2	1	7	1	0	0
David McKinley	9	0	15	1.7	0	0	0	2	0	0	2	0	0	0	0	0	1	1	0.1	1	0	2	1	0
Total	37	-	7450	-	2597	70.2	901	2107	0.428	278	809	0.344	517	749	0.690	451	685	1136	30.7	488	723	481	347	103
Opponents	37	-	7450	-	2311	62.5	775	1880	0.412	198	673	0.294	563	787	0.715	416	881	1297	35.1	415	696	644	221	127

Legend
GP	Games played	GS	Games started	Avg	Average per game
FG	Field-goals made	FGA	Field-goal attempts	Off	Offensive rebounds
Def	Defensive rebounds	A	Assists	TO	Turnovers
Blk	Blocks	Stl	Steals	High	Team high

== Awards and honors ==
=== All-MAC Awards ===
Postseason All-MAC teams
Team	Player	Position	Year
All-MAC First Team	DJ Cooper	G	Jr.
All-MAC Honorable Mention	Walter Offutt	G	Jr.
All-MAC Honorable Mention	Ivo Baltic	F	Jr.

=== National Awards ===
National Award Honors
Honors	Player	Position	Ref.
NCAA Midwest Regional All-Tournament Team	Walter Offutt	F	
