= 2011–12 Ball State Cardinals men's basketball team =

American college basketball season

2011–12 Ball State Cardinals men's basketball
- Conference: Mid-American Conference
- West Division
- Record: 15–15 (6–10 MAC)
- Head coach: Billy Taylor
- Assistant coaches: Bob Simmons; Jay Newberry; Mitch Gilfillan
- Home arena: Worthen Arena

2011–12 Mid-American Conference men's basketball standings
	Conf.				Overall
Team	W		L	PCT	W		L	PCT
East
Akron	13	–	3	.813	22	–	12	.647
Buffalo	12	–	4	.750	20	–	11	.645
Ohio†	11	–	5	.688	29	–	8	.784
Kent State	10	–	6	.625	21	–	12	.636
Bowling Green	9	–	7	.563	16	–	16	.500
Miami	5	–	11	.313	9	–	21	.300
West
Eastern Michigan	9	–	7	.563	14	–	18	.438
Toledo	7	–	9	.438	19	–	17	.528
Western Michigan	6	–	10	.375	14	–	20	.412
Ball State	6	–	10	.375	15	–	15	.500
Central Michigan	5	–	11	.313	11	–	21	.344
Northern Illinois	3	–	13	.188	5	–	26	.161
† 2012 MAC tournament winner As of March 23, 2012; Rankings from AP Poll

The 2011–12 Ball State Cardinals men's basketball team represent Ball State University in the 2011–12 NCAA Division I men's basketball season. The team is coached by Billy Taylor and play their homes game in John E. Worthen Arena. They are a member of the West Division of the Mid-American Conference. They finished the season 15–15, 6–10 in MAC play to finish in fourth place in the West Division. They lost in the first round of the MAC Tournament to Western Michigan.

== Roster ==
2011–12 Ball State Cardinals men's basketball team
Players
Coaches

Pos.	#	Name	Height	Weight	Year	Hometown
F	2	Matt Kamieniecki	6 ft 7 in (2.01 m)	238 lb (108 kg)	So	Clarkston, MI
G	3	Randy Davis	5 ft 11 in (1.8 m)	180 lb (82 kg)	Sr	Plymouth, IN
G	4	Jauwan Scaife	6 ft 2 in (1.88 m)	204 lb (93 kg)	Jr	Muncie, IN
G	5	Zeke Chapman	6 ft 2 in (1.88 m)	183 lb (83 kg)	Fr	Scottsdale, AZ
F	11	Aaron Adeoye	6 ft 6 in (1.98 m)	253 lb (115 kg)	Fr	Marion, IL
G	12	Tyrae Robinson	6 ft 2 in (1.88 m)	185 lb (84 kg)	So	Gary, IN
F	20	Chris Bond	6 ft 4 in (1.93 m)	195 lb (88 kg)	So	Gary, IN
G	23	Pierre Sneed	6 ft 4 in (1.93 m)	206 lb (93 kg)	Sr	Chicago, IL
G	32	Jesse Berry	6 ft 1 in (1.85 m)	189 lb (86 kg)	So	Lafayette, IN
F	34	Tyler Koch	6 ft 5 in (1.96 m)	222 lb (101 kg)	RS So	Winchester, IN
F	45	Jarrod Jones	6 ft 9 in (2.06 m)	234 lb (106 kg)	Sr	Michigan City, IN
C	50	Zach Fields	6 ft 10 in (2.08 m)	296 lb (134 kg)	Jr	North Vernon, IN

Head coach

- Billy Taylor (Notre Dame)

Assistant coach(es)

- Bob Simmons (Wilkes)
- Jay Newberry (Rollins)
- Mitch Gilfillan (Lehigh)

Legend

- (C) Team captain
- (S) Suspended
- (I) Ineligible
- (W) Walk-on
- Injured
- Current redshirt

Roster
Last update: 2011-Oct-30

== Schedule ==
Date time, TV	Rank^{#}	Opponent^{#}	Result	Record	Site (attendance) city, state
Exhibition
Nov. 7*; 7:00 pm		Taylor	W 72–47		John E. Worthen Arena (3,247); Muncie, IN
Regular season
Nov. 13*; 6:00 pm, Fox Sports AZ		at No. 16 Arizona	L 63–73	0–1	McKale Center (12,833); Tucson, AZ
Nov. 18*; 5:05 pm		at Indiana State	L 50–57	0–2	Hulman Center (5,773); Terre Haute, IN
Nov. 23*; 7:00 pm		IUPUI	W 69–62	1–2	John E. Worthen Arena (3,225); Muncie, IN
Nov. 27*; 2:00 pm		Calumet College	W 74–39	2–2	John E. Worthen Arena (3,055); Muncie, IN
Nov. 29*; 7:00 pm		Texas Southern	W 64–53	3–2	John E. Worthen Arena (2,906); Muncie, IN
Dec. 3*; 3:00 pm		at Tennessee–Martin	W 71–48	4–2	Skyhawk Arena (1,201); Martin, TN
Dec. 6*; 8:30 pm		at SIU Edwardsville	W 76–55	5–2	Vadalabene Center (1,708); Edwardsville, IL
Dec. 10*; 2:00 pm, BSSN		Butler	W 58–55	6–2	John E. Worthen Arena (8,412); Muncie, IN
Dec. 19*; 7:00 pm		at IUPUI	L 57–66	6–3	IUPUI Gymnasium (2,074); Indianapolis, IN
Dec. 23*; 6:00 pm		at Morehead State	L 54–62	6–4	Ellis Johnson Arena (1,010); Morehead, KY
Dec. 31*; 2:00 pm		Chicago State	W 86–58	7–4	John E. Worthen Arena (3,202); Muncie, IN
Jan. 4*; 7:00 pm		Florida A&M	W 70–55	8–4	John E. Worthen Arena (2,736); Muncie, IN
Jan. 7; 2:00 pm, BSSN		Western Michigan	W 78–69	9–4 (1–0)	John E. Worthen Arena (4,213); Muncie, IN
Jan. 10; 7:00 pm, STO/ESPN3		at Toledo	W 70–68	10–4 (2–0)	Savage Arena (4,079); Toledo, OH
Jan. 14; 2:00 pm		Eastern Michigan	L 48–51	10–5 (2–1)	John E. Worthen Arena (4,050); Muncie, IN
Jan. 18; 7:00 pm		at Central Michigan	W 73–52	11–5 (3–1)	McGuirk Arena (1,541); Mount Pleasant, MI
Jan. 21; 8:00 pm, BSSN		at Northern Illinois	W 75–65	12–5 (4–1)	Convocation Center (1,961); DeKalb, IL
Jan. 24; 7:00 pm, STO		Akron	L 58–70	12–6 (4–2)	John E. Worthen Arena (3,757); Muncie, IN
Jan. 28; 11:00 am, ESPNU		at Ohio	L 55–59	12–7 (4–3)	Convocation Center (6,018); Athens, OH
Feb. 1; 7:00 pm		at Buffalo	L 57–73	12–8 (4–4)	Alumni Arena (2,112); Buffalo, NY
Feb. 4; 4:00 pm		Miami (OH)	W 59–53	12–9 (4–5)	John E. Worthen Arena (3,917); Muncie, IN
Feb. 8; 7:00 pm, BSSN		Bowling Green	L 54–61	12–10 (4–6)	John E. Worthen Arena (3,070); Muncie, IN
Feb. 11; 11:00 am, ESPNU		at Kent State	L 55–76	12–11 (4–7)	MAC Center (2,472); Kent, OH
Feb. 15; 7:00 pm		Toledo	L 55–63	12–12 (4–8)	John E. Worthen Arena (3,144); Muncie, IN
Feb. 18*; 2:00 pm		Southern Illinois; Bracket Busters	W 71–62	13–12	John E. Worthen Arena (3,272); Muncie, IN
Feb. 22; 7:00 pm, STO		at Western Michigan	L 61–78	13–13 (4–9)	University Arena (2,877); Kalamazoo, MI
Feb. 25; 4:30 pm, BSSN		at Eastern Michigan	L 50–61	13–14 (4–10)	Convocation Center (1,507); Ypsilanti, MI
Feb. 29; 7:00 pm		Central Michigan	W 71–52	14–14 (5–10)	John E. Worthen Arena (2,964); Muncie, IN
Mar. 2; 2:00 pm		Northern Illinois	W 62–51	15–14 (6–10)	John E. Worthen Arena (3,935); Muncie, IN
Mid-American Conference tournament
Mar. 5; 7:00 pm		at Western Michigan; First Round	L 64–76	15–15	Convocation Center (Ohio) (4,153); Athens, OH
*Non-conference game. ^{#}Rankings from AP Poll. (#) Tournament seedings in parentheses. All times are in Eastern Time..
