= D. J. Cooper =

American basketball player (born 1990)

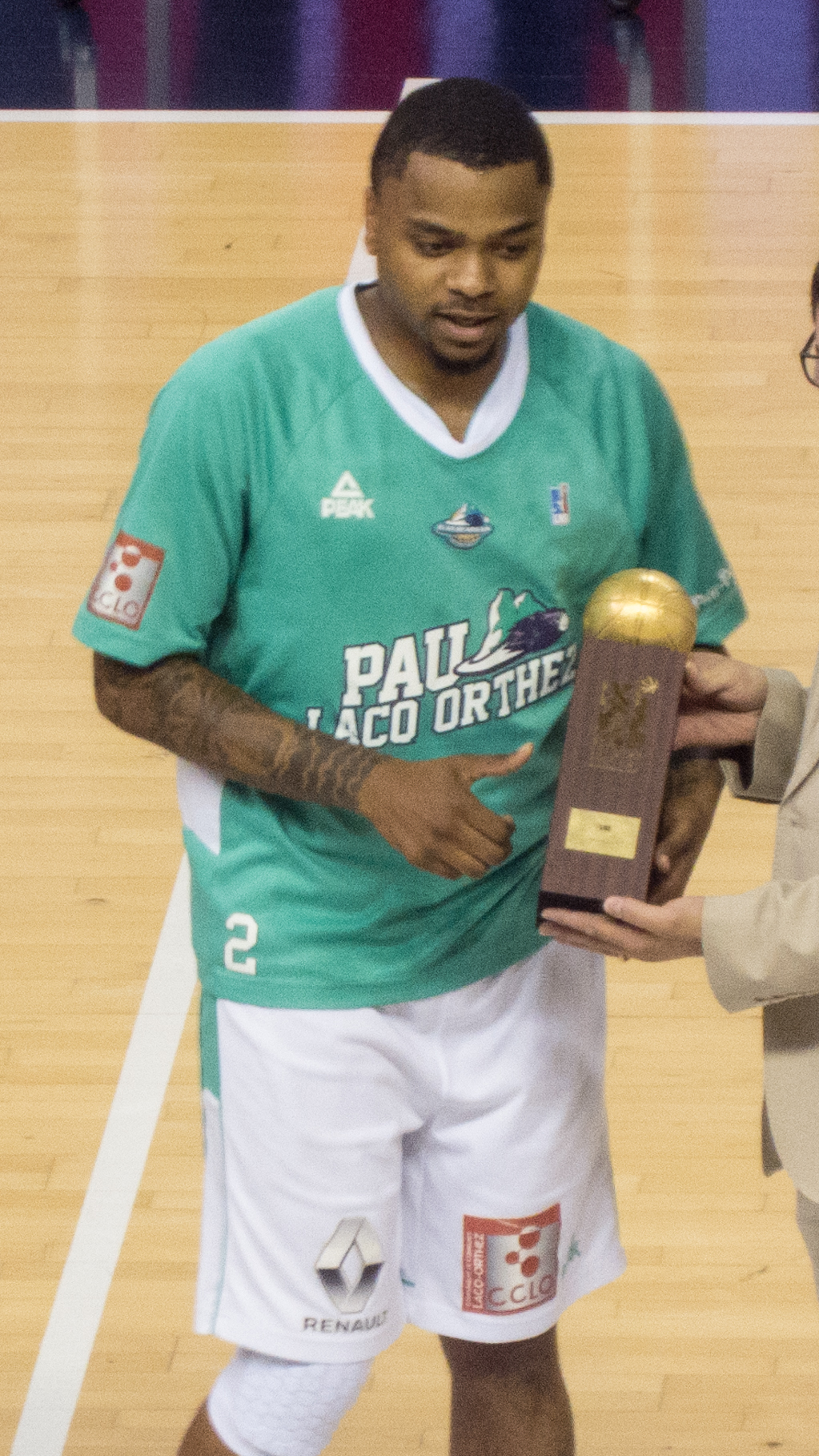
- Cooper holding the Pro A MVP Award in 2017.

No. 12 – Dewa United Banten
- Position: Point guard
- League: IBL

Personal information
- Born: December 6, 1990 (age 35) Chicago, Illinois, U.S.
- Listed height: 6 ft 0 in (1.83 m)
- Listed weight: 176 lb (80 kg)

Career information
- High school: Hales Franciscan (Chicago, Illinois); Seton Academy (South Holland, Illinois)
- College: Ohio (2009–2013)
- NBA draft: 2013: undrafted
- Playing career: 2013–present

Career history
- 2013–2014: PAOK
- 2014–2015: Enisey
- 2015: Panathinaikos
- 2015: Krasny Oktyabr
- 2015–2016: AEK Athens
- 2016: Monaco
- 2016–2017: Élan Béarnais Pau-Orthez
- 2017: BCM Gravelines
- 2017–2018: Monaco
- 2020: Élan Chalon
- 2020: Dorados de Chihuahua
- 2021–2022: Dnipro
- 2022: Bnei Herzliya
- 2022–2023: Ironi Ness Ziona
- 2023–2024: Chorale Roanne
- 2024–2025: Śląsk Wrocław
- 2025: Indomables de Ciudad Juárez
- 2025: Hapoel Holon
- 2025-2026: Astros de Jalisco
- 2025-present: Dewa United Banten BC

Career highlights
- FIBA Europe Cup assists leader (2017); All-Israeli Premier League First Team (2023); Indonesian League assist leader (2026); All-IBL First Team (2026); Israeli Premier League assists leader (2023); Ukrainian Superleague assists leader (2021); French League Cup MVP (2018); 2× French League Cup winner (2016, 2018); LNB Pro A assists leader (2017); LNB Pro A MVP (2017); LNB Pro A All-Star (2017); VTB United League steals leader (2015); VTB United League assists leader (2015); Greek League assists leader (2014); All-Greek League Team (2014); AP honorable mention All-American (2013); MAC Player of the Year (2013); 3× First-team All-MAC (2011–2013); MAC Tournament MVP (2012); MAC Freshman of the Year (2010)

Donell "D. J." Cooper Jr. (born December 6, 1990) is an American professional basketball player for Dewa United Banten BC of the Indonesian Basketball League (IBL). After a successful four years of college basketball at Ohio University, Cooper entered the 2013 NBA draft but was not selected in the draft's two rounds. As a player at Ohio University, Cooper cracked the top 25 all-time Division I assists leaders list early in his final season and steadily rose up on the record as the season progressed. He was named the preseason Mid-American Conference Player of the Year by the league's media, a prediction which proved correct when he was named Player of the Year after the regular season. In 2021-22, he led the Israeli Basketball Premier League in both assists per game and steals per game.

== Early life ==
Cooper grew up in the Chicago area and spent his first three years of high school at Hales Franciscan High School. By the time he was a senior, and after transferring to Seton Academy, Cooper began to get national recognition. He was named a McDonald's All-America nominee and ranked as the 30th best player overall by ESPN.com for the class of 2009. Cooper averaged approximately 16 points and seven assists per game and led Seton Academy to the school's first-ever state championship in any sport when they won Illinois' Class 2A state title.

Cooper was recruited by some major Division I colleges such as Baylor. He ultimately chose to play for Ohio University, a mid-major Division I school, and head coach John Groce because Cooper "wanted to feel like [he] was someone's main priority", which Groce made him feel. He then signed with Ohio and enrolled in the fall of 2009.

== College career ==
Cooper made an immediate impact as a freshman in 2009–10. He averaged 13.5 points, 5.4 rebounds, 5.9 assists and 2.5 steals per game. He finished 11th in scoring and 17th in rebounding in the MAC, while his steals and assists ranked him 5th and 7th nationally. He was named the MAC Freshman of the Year while also helping the Bobcats upset the #3-seeded Georgetown Hoyas in the first round of the 2010 NCAA tournament. No player in the conference recorded more minutes played than Cooper all year and he also set new school records in single-season steals (93) and assists (218).

Heading into his sophomore campaign, Cooper was tabbed as the MAC Preseason Player of the Year. Although he didn't win the award, he was still a first team all-conference selection after breaking his own school record for assists (263), while his 7.5 assists-per-game average ranked third nationally. In a game against the Miami RedHawks he scored his 1,000th career point; in another game against the Akron Zips, he almost recorded a triple-double with 25 points, nine assists and eight rebounds. The team earned a postseason bid to that year's CollegeInsider.com Tournament. They lost in the quarterfinals, however.

Cooper's junior year saw him burst onto the national scene during the 2012 NCAA tournament. The #13-seed Bobcats scored two upsets en route to the school's third ever Sweet 16 appearance. They upset #4-seed Michigan and then took down #12-seed South Florida before finally succumbing to #1-seed North Carolina. Earlier in the season, Cooper recorded Ohio University's first-ever triple double with 14 points, 10 rebounds and 10 assists in a win at Portland. He was named a finalist for both the Cousy Award and Lute Olson Award; at the end of the season Cooper already held the school record for career assists and needed only one more steal to surpass that record as well. He was also named a first team all-conference performer for the second year in a row.

ESPN college basketball analyst Jay Bilas dubbed him as one of the best passers in the nation during Bilas' Weekly Report segment on January 29, 2013. He said of Cooper, "[He] can score, he can dish, does a great job off the pick and roll and always seems to make the right decision. He can absolutely pass it, but more important than that, he can absolutely play. He's among the best point guards in the country."

On March 5, 2013, Cooper scored 24 points at Buffalo to become the only player in the history of college basketball to record 2,000 points, 900 assists, 600 rebounds and 300 steals in a career. Six days later he was named to the All-MAC First Team for the third consecutive year. Cooper finished his collegiate career with 934 assists and 328 steals, which at the time of his graduation ranked him 12th and 18th all-time, respectively, in Division I history.

On March 13, 2013, Cooper was named the Mid-American Conference Player of the Year.

On 5 April 2013, Cooper was announced the East Perfect Player of the Game in the Reese's Division I College All-Star Game. He recorded 11 points, 9 assists, and 4 rebounds in 30 minutes.

=== Statistics ===
| Season | Team | Min | FGM-FGA | FG% | 3PM-3PA | 3P% | FTM-FTA | FT% | Reb | Ast | Blk | Stl | PF | TO | PTS |
|---|---|---|---|---|---|---|---|---|---|---|---|---|---|---|---|
| 2009–10 | Ohio | 35.5 | 4.2–11.2 | .374 | 1.8–5.5 | .319 | 3.2–4.3 | .766 | 5.4 | 5.9 | 0.3 | 2.5 | 2.1 | 2.7 | 13.5 |
| 2010–11 | Ohio | 35.7 | 5.1–13.5 | .382 | 1.7–5.5 | .299 | 3.8–5.1 | .749 | 5.0 | 7.5 | 0.3 | 2.3 | 2.1 | 3.5 | 15.8 |
| 2011–12 | Ohio | 32.4 | 4.4–12.6 | .348 | 2.0–6.6 | .307 | 3.9–5.3 | .745 | 3.7 | 5.7 | 0.1 | 2.3 | 1.4 | 2.8 | 14.7 |
| 2012–13 | Ohio | 31.6 | 4.4–10.4 | .424 | 2.2–6.1 | .364 | 3.1–4.4 | .703 | 3.2 | 7.1 | 0.2 | 2.0 | 1.6 | 3.5 | 14.1 |

== Professional career ==
=== 2013–15 ===
After going undrafted in the 2013 NBA draft, Cooper signed his first professional contract in August 2013, with the Greek Basket League's PAOK for the 2013–14 season.

On August 18, 2014, he signed with Enisey Krasnoyarsk of Russia for the 2014–15 season. On May 12, 2015, he signed with the Greek club Panathinaikos for the rest of the 2014–15 Greek Basket League season.

On August 1, 2015, he signed with Krasny Oktyabr of Russia. On November 21, 2015, he left the Russian club and signed a two-year contract with AEK Athens of Greece. He left AEK after appearing in seven games. On January 25, 2016, he signed with AS Monaco Basket for the rest of the season.

=== 2016–18 ===
On August 8, 2016, Cooper signed with Élan Béarnais Pau-Orthez of France. Cooper was the assists leader in the 2016–17 Pro A season, and after the regular season he was named the competition's Most Valuable Player.

On July 8, 2017, Cooper signed a two-year deal with French club BCM Gravelines. On October 16, 2017, he parted ways with Gravelines after appearing in four games. Three days later, he returned to AS Monaco. After averaging 6.9 points and 7.2 assists per game in the 2017–18 season, Cooper announced he was leaving Monaco on September 7, 2018.

=== 2020–present ===
On June 10, 2020, Cooper signed with Élan Chalon of the LNB Pro A in France. He parted ways with the team on October 8, after appearing in three games and averaging 9.6 points and 6.6 assists per game. On November 3, Cooper signed with the Dorados de Chihuahua of the Liga Nacional de Baloncesto Profesional in Mexico; he played two games for them. On December 14, 2020, he signed with Stal Ostrów Wielkopolski in Poland, but he left them on December 23. On February 25, 2021, he signed with Dnipro Dnipropetrovsk in Ukraine. The Ukrainian Basketball SuperLeague paused in March 2022.

Cooper then signed with Bnei Herzliya Basket in the Israeli Basketball Premier League. In the 2021-22 season, he led the league in assist average, averaging 10.2 per game, and in steals average, at 2.4 per game.

On July 5, 2022, he signed with Ironi Ness Ziona of the Israeli Basketball Premier League.

On November 7, 2024, he signed with Śląsk Wrocław of the Polish Basketball League (PLK).

On February 18, 2025, he signed with Hapoel Holon of the Israeli Basketball Premier League.

=== Suspension ===
In 2019, FIBA issued Cooper a two-year suspension for using another person's urine in an attempt to cheat a doping test. The test initially indicated an elevated level of human chorionic gonadotropin, which is most commonly produced by the placenta during pregnancy. That urine, according to the report, belonged to his girlfriend.

== National team career ==
Cooper applied for Bosnian citizenship in 2014. He was named a member of the senior men's Bosnian national basketball team, and was going to play with Bosnia at the EuroBasket 2015 qualification tournament. However, he first left Bosnia for a family emergency. After his return, he suffered an injury during Bosnia's training camp, and he was unable to play at the qualification tournament. Ultimately, his Bosnian citizenship was never processed, according to FIBA.

== Career statistics ==
Legend
| GP | Games played | MPG | Minutes per game | FG% | Field goal percentage |
| 3P% | 3-point field goal percentage | FT% | Free throw percentage | RPG | Rebounds per game |
| APG | Assists per game | SPG | Steals per game | BPG | Blocks per game |
| PPG | Points per game | **Bold** | Career high | | Led the league |

=== Domestic leagues ===
==== Regular season ====
Note: Only games in the primary domestic competitions are included. Therefore, games in cup or European competitions are left out.

| Year | Team | League | GP | MPG | FG% | 3P% | FT% | RPG | APG | SPG | BPG | PPG |
|---|---|---|---|---|---|---|---|---|---|---|---|---|
| 2013–14 | PAOK | GBL | 26 | 30.5 | .531 | .317 | .783 | 4.8 | 6.6 | 1.6 | 0.0 | 10.6 |

==== Playoffs ====
| Year | Team | League | GP | MPG | FG% | 3P% | FT% | RPG | APG | SPG | BPG | PPG |
|---|---|---|---|---|---|---|---|---|---|---|---|---|
| 2013–14 | PAOK | GBL | **9** | **30.5** | .545 | **.285** | **.757** | **3.9** | **6.2** | **1.9** | **0.2** | **10.7** |
| 2014–15 | Panathinaikos | GBL | 8 | 15.0 | **.600** | .235 | .333 | 2.5 | 2.5 | 0.6 | 0.0 | 3.4 |

== See also ==
- List of NCAA Division I men's basketball career assists leaders
