= Carlton Guyton =

American basketball player

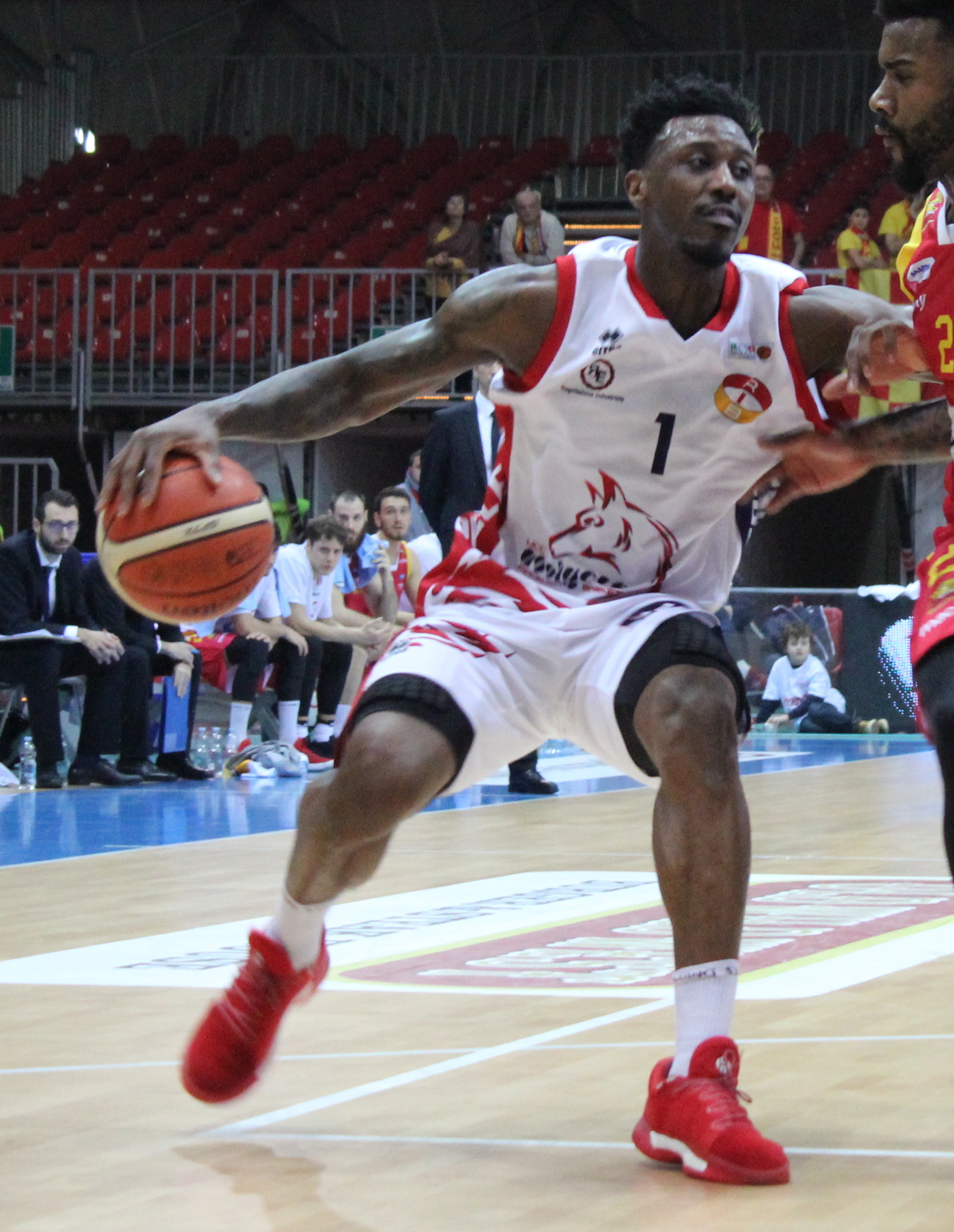
- Guyton in action with Assigeco Casalpusterlengo.

No. 1 – ZTE
- Position: Shooting guard
- League: NB I/A; FIBA Europe Cup

Personal information
- Born: August 7, 1990 (age 36) Chicago, Illinois
- Listed height: 6 ft 4 in (1.93 m)
- Listed weight: 195 lb (88 kg)

Career information
- High school: Rich South (Chicago, Illinois)
- College: Mineral Area College (2008–2010); Kent State (2010–2012)
- NBA draft: 2012: undrafted
- Playing career: 2012–present

Career history
- 2012–2013: Stockholm Eagles
- 2013–2014: Ehingen Urspring
- 2014–2016: Oettinger Rockets
- 2016–2017: Löwen Braunschweig
- 2017–2018: Assigeco Casalpusterlengo
- 2018: Rethymno Cretan Kings
- 2018–2019: Hamburg Towers
- 2019–2020: Alba Fehérvár
- 2020–2021: DEAC
- 2021–present: ZTE

Career highlights
- ProA champion (2019); MAC Sixth Man of the Year (2011)

Carlton Guyton (born August 7, 1990) is an American professional basketball player for ZTE of the Hungarian Nemzeti Bajnokság I/A (NB I/A). Standing at 1.93 m (6 ft 4 in), he plays at the shooting guard position. He played college basketball at Mineral Area College and Kent State.

== High school career ==
Guyton played high school basketball at Rich South High School in Richton Park, Illinois. He averaged 17.1 points, 3.4 rebounds, 2.4 assists and shot over 75 percent from the foul line while earning all-conference honors. He also played AAU ball with the Illinois Ice and Bobcat squad.

== College career ==
=== Mineral Area College ===
As a freshman at Mineral Area College, he started the final 15 games and helped lead to a 19–12 record and a Region XVI Championship game appearance. He earned all-conference and all-region honors while leading his team to a 20–12 record and an NJCAA Regional XVI semifinal appearance. During the 2009–10 season, Guyton averaged 15 points, 5.1 rebounds, 3.7 assists and 1.3 steals per game.

=== Kent State ===
During his junior year, Guyton joined Kent State. He played in 32 games averaging 12.4 points, 3.8 rebounds and 2.4 assists. At his first season, he was named the MAC Sixth Man of the Year. At his senior year, he appeared in all 33 games, starting in 31 of them, averaging 9.9 points per game to go along with 2.7 rebounds.

== Professional career ==
After going undrafted in the 2012 NBA draft, Guyton joined Stockholm Eagles of the Basketligan. After a solid season, he moved to Germany and joined Ehingen Urspring.

On May 29, 2014, Guyton joined Oettinger Rockets of the ProA. He stayed at the club for two seasons, before joining Löwen Braunschweig of the Bundesliga, where he averaged 11.2 points per game.

On July 20, 2017, he joined Assigeco Casalpusterlengo of the Serie A2.

On June 21, 2018, Guyton joined Rethymno Cretan Kings of the Greek Basket League. On October 7, 2018, he parted ways with Cretan Kings, after being replaced by Elijah Johnson on the team's squad.

On July 26, 2019, he has signed with Alba Fehérvár of the Hungarian League. He averaged 15 points, 3.4 rebounds and 4.6 assists per game. On June 14, 2020, Guyton signed with DEAC. He averaged 9.4 points, 3.4 rebounds, and 2.4 assists per game. On July 25, 2021, Guyton signed with ZTE.
