= John Groce =

American basketball coach (born 1971)

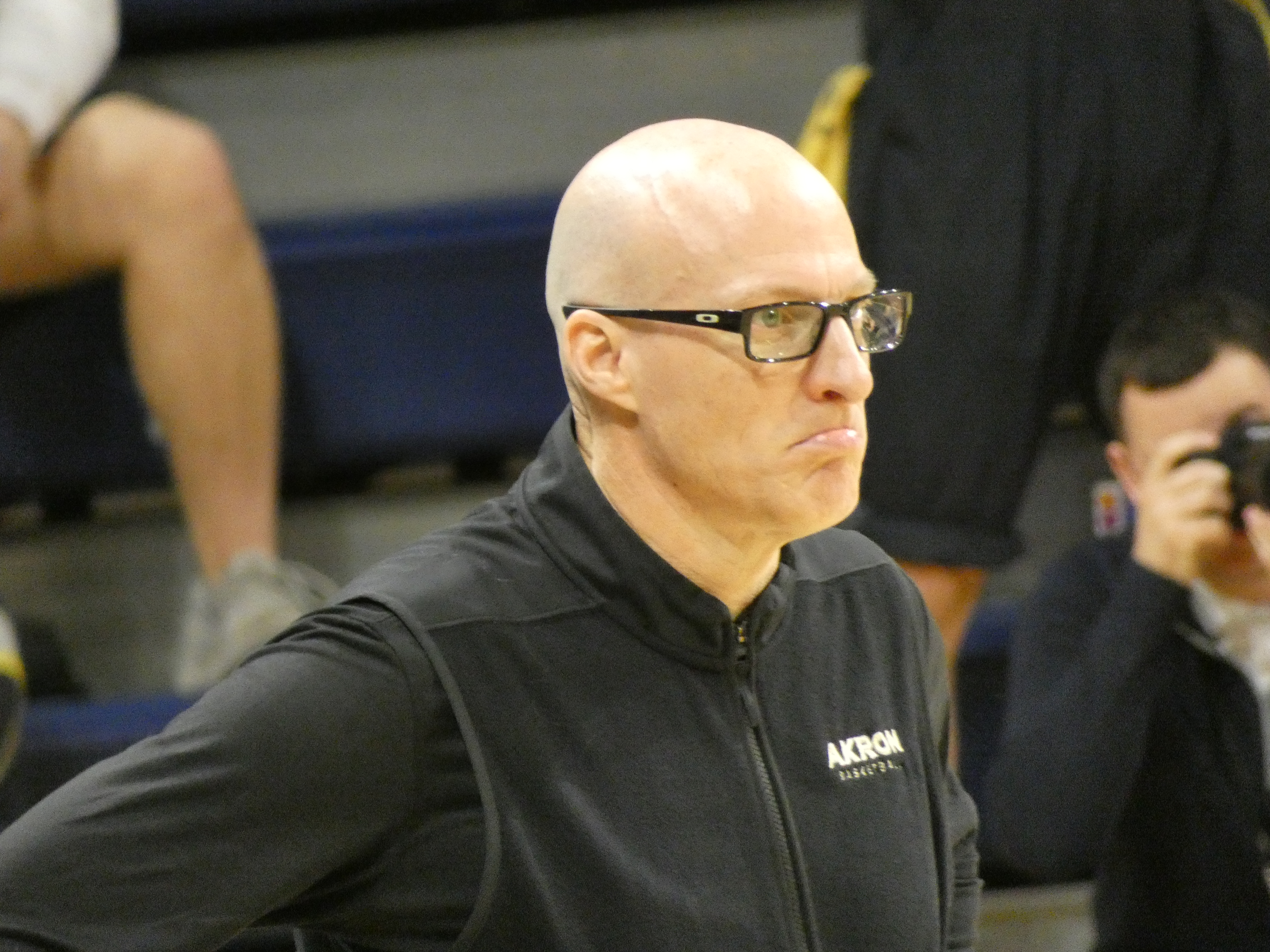
- Groce with Akron in 2024

Current position
- Title: Head coach
- Team: Charleston
- Conference: CAA
- Record: 4–1 (.800)

Biographical details
- Born: September 7, 1971 (age 55); Muncie, Indiana, U.S.

Playing career
- 1991–1994: Taylor

Coaching career (HC unless noted)
- 1993–1996: Taylor (assistant)
- 1996–2000: NC State (assistant)
- 2000–2001: Butler (assistant)
- 2001–2004: Xavier (assistant)
- 2004–2008: Ohio State (assistant)
- 2008–2012: Ohio
- 2012–2017: Illinois
- 2017–2026: Akron
- 2026–present: Charleston

Head coaching record
- Overall: 381–226 (.628)
- Tournaments: 4–7 (NCAA Division I); 3–3 (NIT); 1–1 (CIT)

Accomplishments and honors

Championships
- 6 MAC tournament (2010, 2012, 2022, 2024–2026); 2 MAC regular season (2020, 2025); MAC East Division (2020)

Awards
- Hugh Durham Award (2025); 2× MAC Coach of the Year (2020, 2025)

John Gordon Groce (/ɡroʊs/; born September 7, 1971) is an American college basketball coach, currently the head coach for the Charleston Cougars men's basketball team. Prior to coaching for Charleston, he was the head coach at Akron, Illinois and Ohio.

== Coaching career ==
=== Player and assistant coach ===
Groce graduated from Taylor University, an NAIA Division II school in Upland, Indiana, in 1994 and played basketball for the school while he was there. Groce started his coaching career as an assistant with his alma mater, Taylor University, under Paul Patterson from 1993 to 1996. His next job was an assistant at North Carolina State under Herb Sendek from 1996 to 2000. He then moved on to Butler as an assistant to Thad Matta and was there just one season (2000–01). When Matta accepted the head coaching position at Xavier, Groce went with him and served as an assistant from 2001 to 2004, before moving again with Matta when he was named as the head coach of Ohio State. He served as an assistant from 2004 to 2008.

=== Ohio University ===
Following the resignation of Tim O'Shea, Groce was named the head coach at Ohio University on June 27, 2008. In his first year, the Bobcats finished 7–9 in Mid-American Conference play and failed to qualify for postseason play. The team's overall record improved the following year, but the Bobcats finished with another 7–9 record. However, the Bobcats went on a run in the MAC tournament, winning the championship as the No. 9 seed. As a result, the Bobcats received the conference's automatic bid to the NCAA tournament. They received a No. 14 seed in the Midwest region and Groce led the Bobcats to an upset win over 3-seeded Georgetown in the First Round. They then lost in the Second Round to Tennessee.

In 2011, the Bobcats increased their conference record to 9–7 and earned a bid to the CollegeInsider.com Tournament (CIT). A first round victory over Marshall preceded a loss to East Tennessee State in the CIT Quarterfinals.

In 2012, Groce led the Bobcats to an 11–5 conference record and another MAC tournament championship. As the conference's automatic bid to the NCAA tournament, the Bobcats received a No. 13 seed. In the Tournament, Ohio defeated No. 4-seeded Michigan and No. 12-seeded South Florida to earn a trip to the Sweet Sixteen, Ohio's first trip to the Sweet Sixteen since 1964. In the Sweet Sixteen, they pushed No. 1-seed North Carolina to overtime before losing 73–65.

In four seasons at Ohio, Groce was 85–56 overall and 34–30 in Mid-American Conference games.

=== University of Illinois ===
Groce finalized negotiations to become the men's basketball head coach at the University of Illinois on March 28, 2012, after both Shaka Smart and Brad Stevens declined interest in the position.

The Illini started 12–0 in 2013 under Groce, the best start for a first-year coach in the team's modern era. The team won the 2012 Maui Invitational by defeating Butler in the championship game. Illinois finished the year 23–13, but with a losing conference record at 8–10. The Illini did receive a bid to the NCAA tournament advancing to the Third Round (formerly known as the Second Round) before losing to No. 2-seeded Miami.

During their 2014 season, Illinois' success in the month of November improved to 21–0 under Groce. Until losing five non-conference games in the 2015–16 season, Illinois was the only program in the nation with an undefeated November record, dating back to 2011. The Illini would slip however, finishing 20–15, 7–11 in Big Ten play and failing to make the NCAA tournament. They did receive a bid to the NIT advancing to the second round.

The Illini continued to struggle in 2015, finishing 19–14, 9–9 and again failing to make the NCAA tournament. They did receive a bid to the NIT where they lost in the first round.

Before the end of their 2016 season, new Illinois AD Josh Whitman gave Groce a vote of confidence, praising his leadership and stating that "John Groce is going to continue to be our basketball coach." However, the Illini finished the season 15–19, 5–13.

From 2013 to 2016, Groce reversed Illinois' prior four-game losing streak in the annual Braggin' Rights interstate rivalry against Missouri by winning the contest for four straight seasons.

The Illini fared better in 2017, finishing 20–15, 8–10. The team did win four in a row toward the end of the season leading to talks of an NCAA tournament bid, but a loss at Rutgers in the final regular season game likely ended their Tournament hopes. On March 11, 2017, Groce was relieved of his duties, two days after the Illini lost its Big Ten tournament opening-round game to Michigan. Following his dismissal, the Illini advanced to the NIT quarterfinals before losing to UCF. He was eventually replaced by Oklahoma State head coach Brad Underwood.

=== University of Akron ===
Following his dismissal from Illinois, Groce was hired on April 5, 2017, to become the new head coach of the Akron Zips. In 2020, Groce's Zips won the MAC regular season title, but were not able to participate in the postseason due to the COVID pandemic. In 2022, the Zips won the MAC Tournament Championship against their rival, Kent State. He took the Zips to the 2022 NCAA Tournament as a 13 seed where they lost in the First Round to 4th seeded UCLA. In 2023, Groce led his team to the MAC Championship Semifinal, but were unable to make consecutive appearances in the NCAA Tournament. In 2024, Groce's Zips won the MAC Tournament Championship, also against Kent State, and clinched Akron's 6th appearance in the NCAA Tournament. They entered as a 14 seed and lost their first round matchup against 3 seed Creighton. In 2025 they won the MAC and the MAC tournament As a 13 seed, they lost their first round matchup in the NCAA tournament match to Arizona.

His 2026 team had a 17–1 record MAC play which was good for second place. Their only conference loss was to Miami who finished the regular season unbeaten and ranked 20th. Their 34–2 conference record over two seasons set a new MAC mark for best record over a two-year span. Akron won the MAC tournament and earned a spot in the 2026 NCAA tournament. This was Akron's third straight MAC tournament championship. They lost to Texas Tech in the first round.

=== College of Charleston ===
On March 30, 2026, he accepted the head coach position at the College of Charleston.

== Head coaching record ==
Record table
Season	Team	Overall	Conference	Standing	Postseason
Ohio Bobcats (Mid-American Conference) (2008–2012)
2008–09	Ohio	15–17	7–9	6th (East)	
2009–10	Ohio	22–15	7–9	5th (East)	NCAA Division I Round of 32
2010–11	Ohio	19–16	9–7	3rd (East)	CIT Quarterfinal
2011–12	Ohio	29–8	11–5	3rd (East)	NCAA Division I Sweet 16
Ohio:		85–56 (.603)	34–30 (.531)		
Illinois Fighting Illini (Big Ten Conference) (2012–2017)
2012–13	Illinois	23–13	8–10	T–7th	NCAA Division I Round of 32
2013–14	Illinois	20–15	7–11	T–8th	NIT Second Round
2014–15	Illinois	19–14	9–9	T–7th	NIT First Round
2015–16	Illinois	15–19	5–13	12th	
2016–17	Illinois	18–14	8–10	9th	NIT Quarterfinal
Illinois:		95–75 (.559)	37–53 (.411)		
Akron Zips (Mid-American Conference) (2017–2026)
2017–18	Akron	14–18	6–12	6th (East)	
2018–19	Akron	17–16	8–10	4th (East)	
2019–20	Akron	24–7	14–4	1st (East)	No postseason held
2020–21	Akron	15–8	12–6	T–3rd	
2021–22	Akron	24–10	14–6	4th	NCAA Division I Round of 64
2022–23	Akron	22–11	13–5	3rd	
2023–24	Akron	24–11	13–5	T–2nd	NCAA Division I Round of 64
2024–25	Akron	28–7	17–1	1st	NCAA Division I Round of 64
2025–26	Akron	29–6	17–1	2nd	NCAA Division I Round of 64
Akron:		197–94 (.677)	116–51 (.695)		
Charleston Cougars (Coastal Athletic Association) (2026–present)
2026–27	Charleston	4–1	0–0		
Charleston:		4–1 (.800)	0–0 (–)		
Total:		381–226 (.628)			
National champion Postseason invitational champion Conference regular season champion Conference regular season and conference tournament champion Division regular season champion Division regular season and conference tournament champion Conference tournament champion

== Personal life ==
Groce's brother is Travis Steele, the current head coach of Miami (OH).
