= Justin Greene =

American basketball player and coach

Ohio Cardinals
- Title: Assistant coach

Personal information
- Born: August 13, 1989 (age 37) Brooklyn, New York, U.S.
- Listed height: 6 ft 8 in (2.03 m)
- Listed weight: 230 lb (104 kg)

Career information
- High school: Abraham Lincoln (Brooklyn, New York)
- College: Kent State (2008–2012)
- NBA draft: 2012: undrafted
- Playing career: 2012–2014
- Position: Small forward
- Number: 15
- Coaching career: 2018–present

Career history

Playing
- 2012–2013: NH Ostrava
- 2013–2014: Musel Pikes

Coaching
- 2018–present: Ohio Cardinals (assistant)

Career highlights
- MAC Player of the Year (2011); AP Honorable mention All-American (2011); First-team All-MAC (2011)

Justin Pierre Greene (born August 13, 1989) is an American former basketball player and current coach. He played college basketball for the NCAA Division I Kent State Golden Flashes. On May 20, 2008, Greene committed to attend Kent State University. In his freshman season, Greene saw limited playing time, averaging 8.8 minutes per game and 2.2 points per game. His minutes per game increased to 28.1 in his sophomore season and his points per game also went up to 13.6 to go along 6.9 rebounds per game. In Greene's junior season, he averaged 15.4 points per game, 8.3 rebounds per game and 1.6 assists per game, which was good enough for him to be recognized as the Mid-American Conference Men's Basketball Player of the Year.

== Professional career ==
Justin Greene played professionally for two seasons. In 2014 he became a graduate assistant coach for Kent State University. On October 20, he was named an assistant coach for the Ohio Cardinals via Twitter.
