= 2011–12 Houston Baptist Huskies men's basketball team =

American college basketball season

2011–12 Houston Baptist Huskies men's basketball
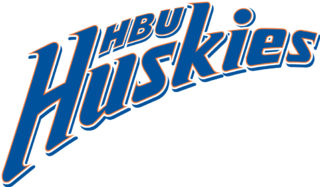
- Conference: Great West Conference
- Record: 10–20 (3–7 Great West)
- Head coach: Ron Cottrell (21st season)
- Assistant coaches: Steven Key; Keith Berard; Justin Kinne
- Home arena: Sharp Gymnasium

2011–12 Great West Conference men's basketball standings
	Conf.				Overall
Team	W		L	PCT	W		L	PCT
Utah Valley	9	–	1	.900	20	–	13	.606
North Dakota †	6	–	4	.600	17	–	15	.531
Texas-Pan American	5	–	5	.500	11	–	21	.344
NJIT	5	–	5	.500	15	–	17	.469
Houston Baptist	3	–	7	.300	10	–	20	.333
* Chicago State	2	–	8	.200	4	–	26	.133
† 2012 Great West tournament winner As of March 14, 2012; Rankings from AP Poll * Ineligible for conference tournament

The 2011–12 Houston Baptist Huskies men's basketball team represented Houston Baptist University in the 2011–12 college basketball season. This was head coach Ron Cottrell's twenty-first season at HBU. The Huskies played their home games at the Sharp Gymnasium and are members of the Great West Conference. They finished the season 10–20, 3–7 in Great West play to finish in fifth place. They lost in the quarterfinal of the Great West Basketball tournament to NJIT.

== Roster ==
2011–12 Houston Baptist Huskies men's basketball team
Players
Coaches

Pos.	#	Name	Height	Weight	Year	Previous school	Hometown
G	2	Marcel Smith	5 ft 6 in (1.68 m)	150 lb (68 kg)	Fr	Academy for Business and Technology in Melvindale	Detroit, MI
G	3	Tyler Russell	6 ft 0 in (1.83 m)	180 lb (82 kg)	Fr	Millennium	Goodyear, AZ
F	4	Art Bernardi	6 ft 9 in (2.06 m)	225 lb (102 kg)	Jr	Colegio Avanco; New Mexico JC	Caxias do Sul, Brazil
G	5	Ronald March Jr.	6 ft 5 in (1.96 m)	170 lb (77 kg)	Fr	Thunderbird	Phoenix, AZ
F	10	Lamar Thomas	6 ft 9 in (2.06 m)	235 lb (107 kg)	Jr	Solebury Prep; Fordham	Littleton, CO
G	11	Anthony Hill	6 ft 0 in (1.83 m)	175 lb (79 kg)	Jr	Plano East; Colgate	Plano, TX
G	14	Aaron Asp	5 ft 10 in (1.78 m)	180 lb (82 kg)	So	CHSA	Houston, TX
G	20	T. J. Berry	6 ft 2 in (1.88 m)	190 lb (86 kg)	So	Spring	Spring, TX
F	22	Marcus Davis	6 ft 5 in (1.96 m)	190 lb (86 kg)	Jr	La Joya; South Mountain CC	Glendale, AZ
G	23	Dewayne Bowden	5 ft 11 in (1.8 m)	165 lb (75 kg)	Fr	Aldine	Houston, TX
F	24	Terry Bembry	6 ft 7 in (2.01 m)	225 lb (102 kg)	Sr	Bush; IPFW; North Dakota State College of Science	Houston, TX
G	25	Dustin Hobaugh	6 ft 4 in (1.93 m)	190 lb (86 kg)	Fr	Clear Creek	League City, TX
G	35	Jonathan Evans	5 ft 10 in (1.78 m)	170 lb (77 kg)	So	Bellaire	Houston, TX
	51	Joe Latas	6 ft 11 in (2.11 m)	275 lb (125 kg)	Sr	Bedford Chanel; Cleveland State	Cleveland, OH

Head coach

- Ron Cottrell (Arkansas)

Assistant coach(es)

- Steven Key (Houston Baptist)
- Keith Berard (Southern Utah)
- Justin 'Jud' Kinne (Albion)

Legend

- (C) Team captain
- (S) Suspended
- (I) Ineligible
- (W) Walk-on
- Injured
- Current redshirt

== Schedule and results ==
Date time, TV	Rank^{#}	Opponent^{#}	Result	Record	High points	High rebounds	High assists	Site (attendance) city, state
Exhibition
11/5/2011*; 7:05pm		Augsburg; Homecoming	L 68–74	—	18 – Latas	9 – Latas	5 – Smith	Sharp Gymnasium (1,025); Houston, TX
Regular Season
11/11/2011*; 6:30pm		at Campbell	L 68–82	0–1	17 – Latas & Hobaugh	6 – Latas & Hobaugh	5 – Evans	John W. Pope, Jr. Convocation Center (1,305); Buies Creek, NC
11/14/2011*; 7:05pm		Bethune–Cookman	W 76–74 ^{OT}	1–1	19 – Latas	14 – Latas	5 – Evans	Sharp Gymnasium (570); Houston, TX
11/18/2011*; 7:30pm		at Louisiana–Lafayette; Beryl Shipley Classic	L 64–73	1–2	15 – Russell	8 – March	2 – Davis	Cajundome (3,473); Lafayette, LA
11/19/2011*; 5:00pm		vs. Nicholls State; Beryl Shipley Classic	L 70–80	1–3	14 – March	5 – March	6 – Russell	Cajundome (3,460); Lafayette, LA
11/20/2011*; 1:00pm		vs. Cal State Fullerton; Beryl Shipley Classic	W 88–83	2–3	20 – Russell	6 – Russell	3 – Smith	Cajundome (3,460); Lafayette, LA
11/25/2011*; 5:00pm		at Washington	L 65–88	2–4	20 – Davis	14 – Davis	4 – Smith & Russell	Alaska Airlines Arena (9,273); Seattle, WA
11/30/2011*; 7:05pm		Rice	L 66–78	2–5	20 – Russell	9 – Davis	3 – Smith	Sharp Gymnasium (1,041); Houston, TX
12/03/2011*; 4:00pm		at Texas State	L 76–103	2–6	20 – Bernardi	6 – Davis	3 – Hill & Evans	Strahan Coliseum (1,352); San Marcos, TX
12/10/2011*; 7:05pm		Dallas Christian	W 112–80	3–6	30 – Davis	8 – March & Bembry	3 – Davis, Hill, & Evans	Sharp Gymnasium (681); Houston, TX
12/14/2011*; 7:05pm, FS Houston		Campbell	W 87–76	4–6	14 – Smith	8 – Bembry	4 – Bernardi & Davis	Sharp Gymnasium (602); Houston, TX
12/17/2011*; 7:05pm		at No. 25 Creighton	L 62–97	4–7	16 – Bernardi & Hill	5 – Bernardi & Latas	3 – Smith	CenturyLink Center Omaha (16,513); Omaha, NE
12/21/2011*; 7:05pm, FS Houston		Santa Clara	W 72–71	5–7	19 – Russell	6 – Latas & Bembry	3 – Russell	Sharp Gymnasium (579); Houston, TX
12/31/2011*; 3:05pm		at Duquesne	L 72–118	5–8	16 – Bembry	5 – Russell & Bembry	6 – Smith	A. J. Palumbo Center (2,487); Pittsburgh, PA
01/03/2012*; 8:05 pm, KASY		at New Mexico	L 61–98	5–9	12 – Hobaugh	5 – Thomas	4 – Evans	The Pit (12,789); Albuquerque, NM
01/07/2012*; 7:05 pm		Eastern Illinois	L 62–74	5–10	13 – Latas	7 – Hill	3 – Evans	Sharp Gymnasium (462); Houston, TX
01/12/2012*; 7:05 pm		Crowley's Ridge	W 123–43	6–10	40 – Davis	13 – Davis	7 – Evans	Sharp Gymnasium (527); Houston, TX
01/19/2012; 6:00pm		at NJIT	L 62–85	6–11 (0–1)	14 – Bernardi	7 – Latas	4 – Hill & Smith	Fleisher Center (383); Newark, NJ
01/21/2012; 2:05pm		at Chicago State	L 95–98 ^{OT}	6–12 (0–2)	20 – Bembry	13 – Davis	4 – Russell & Evans	Emil and Patricia Jones Convocation Center (300); Chicago, IL
01/24/2012*; 7:05pm		Texas–Arlington	L 74–79	6–13	19 – Bembry	8 – Bernardi	4 – Russell & Hill	Sharp Gymnasium (489); Houston, TX
01/28/2012; 7:00pm		at Texas-Pan American	L 71–81	6–14 (0–3)	17 – Bembry	9 – Latas	3 – Smith	UTPA Fieldhouse (823); Edinburg, TX
02/02/2012; 7:05pm		North Dakota	W 69–62	7–14 (1–3)	19 – Bernardi	6 – Bembry & Bernardi	4 – Bembry	Sharp Gymnasium (632); Houston, TX
02/04/2012; 7:05pm		Utah Valley	L 66–68	7–15 (1–4)	17 – Bembry	7 – Bembry	5 – Smith	Sharp Gymnasium (649); Houston, TX
02/08/2012*; 6:05pm		at Bethune–Cookman	L 76–84	7–16	15 – Bembry	9 – Davis	2 – Bembry, Bernardi, Hill, Hobaugh, & Smith	Moore Gymnasium (668); Daytona Beach, FL
02/11/2012*; 7:05pm		Ecclesia	W 93–72	8–16	22 – Russell	13 – Thomas	4 – Smith	Sharp Gymnasium (503); Houston, TX
02/16/2012; 7:05pm		Chicago State	L 56–65	8–17 (1–5)	15 – Bembry	6 – Bernardi	3 – Evans	Sharp Gymnasium (531); Houston, TX
02/18/2012; 7:05pm		NJIT	W 75–68	9–17 (2–5)	21 – Russell	4 – Bernardi, Davis, & Latas	3 – Russell & Smith	Sharp Gymnasium (704 ) Houston, TX
02/23/2012; 8:05pm, UVU-TV		at Utah Valley	L 56–75	9–18 (2–6)	11 – Hill, Russell, & Bernardi	6 – Latas	4 – Davis	UCCU Center (2,733); Orem, UT
02/25/2012; 4:00pm, FCS Central		at North Dakota	L 62–66	9–19 (2–7)	22 – Davis	6 – Davis	6 – Evans	Betty Engelstad Sioux Center (1,576); Grand Forks, ND
03/03/2012; 7:05pm		Texas–Pan American	W 65–58	10–19 (3–7)	18 – Latas	10 – Latas	4 – Russell	Sharp Gymnasium (827); Houston, TX
Great West tournament
03/08/2012; 2:30pm	(5)	vs. (4) NJIT; Quarterfinal	L 64–65	10–20	17 – Russell	6 – Latas & Russell	4 – Latas	Emil and Patricia Jones Convocation Center (N/A); Chicago, IL
*Non-conference game. ^{#}Rankings from AP Poll. (#) Tournament seedings in parentheses.
