= 2011–12 Texas–Pan American Broncs men's basketball team =

American college basketball season

2011–12 Texas–Pan American Broncs men's basketball
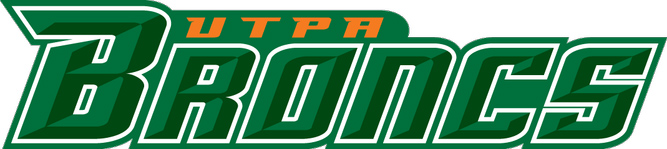
- Conference: Great West Conference
- Record: 11–21 (5–5 Great West)
- Head coach: Ryan Marks (3rd season)
- Assistant coaches: Tim Anderson; Nick Bennett; Joel Weiss
- Home arena: UTPA Fieldhouse

2011–12 Great West Conference men's basketball standings
| | Conf. | | | | Overall |
| Team | W | | L | PCT | W | | L | PCT |
|---|---|---|---|---|---|---|---|---|
| Utah Valley | 9 | – | 1 | .900 | 20 | – | 13 | .606 |
| North Dakota † | 6 | – | 4 | .600 | 17 | – | 15 | .531 |
| Texas-Pan American | 5 | – | 5 | .500 | 11 | – | 21 | .344 |
| NJIT | 5 | – | 5 | .500 | 15 | – | 17 | .469 |
| Houston Baptist | 3 | – | 7 | .300 | 10 | – | 20 | .333 |
| * Chicago State | 2 | – | 8 | .200 | 4 | – | 26 | .133 |
† 2012 Great West tournament winner As of March 14, 2012; Rankings from AP Poll * Ineligible for conference tournament

The 2011–12 Texas–Pan American Broncs men's basketball team represented the University of Texas–Pan American in the 2011–12 college basketball season. This was head coach Ryan Mark's third season at UTPA. The Broncs play their home games at the UTPA Fieldhouse and are members of the Great West Conference. They finished the season 11–21, 5–5 in Great West play to finish in a tie for third place. They lost in the semifinals of the Great West Basketball tournament to North Dakota.

== Media ==
The Broncs have all their home games televised online at http://www.utpa.edu/broncslive/. However no Broncs games are broadcast on the radio.

== Roster ==
2011–12 UTPA Broncs men's basketball team
Players
Coaches

| Pos. | # | Name | Height | Weight | Year | Previous school | Hometown |
|---|---|---|---|---|---|---|---|
| G | 1 | Brandon Provost | 6 ft 3 in (1.91 m) | 189 lb (86 kg) | Jr | Seven Lakes; Air Force | Katy, TX |
| G | 3 | Aaron Urbanus | 6 ft 0 in (1.83 m) | 147 lb (67 kg) | Jr | James Bowie | Austin, TX |
| G | 4 | Josh Sanchez | 5 ft 11 in (1.8 m) | 160 lb (73 kg) | Fr | Carroll | Corpus Christi, TX |
| G | 10 | Kieondre Arkwright | 6 ft 1 in (1.85 m) | 155 lb (70 kg) | Sr | Carman-Ainsworth; St. Clair | Flint, MI |
| G | 11 | Jared Maree | 6 ft 3 in (1.91 m) | 200 lb (91 kg) | Sr | Chávez | Houston, TX |
| G | 12 | Nick Weiermiller | 6 ft 1 in (1.85 m) | 203 lb (92 kg) | Sr | Elmira Free Academy | Elmira, NY |
| F | 13 | Ruben Cabrera | 6 ft 7 in (2.01 m) | 245 lb (111 kg) | Jr | Marianapolis Prep; Collin | Bayamón, Puerto Rico |
| C | 15 | Enique Mason | 6 ft 9 in (2.06 m) | 255 lb (116 kg) | So | Fishburne Military | Indianapolis, IN |
| F | 20 | Earl Jefferson | 6 ft 5 in (1.96 m) | 190 lb (86 kg) | Jr | Barstow; Fresno City | Barstow, CA |
| G | 21 | Julio Oyervides | 6 ft 0 in (1.83 m) | 180 lb (82 kg) | So | McAllen | McAllen, TX |
| G | 23 | Jesus Delgado | 6 ft 4 in (1.93 m) | 200 lb (91 kg) | Jr | Montwood; Collin | El Paso, TX |
| F | 25 | Josh Cleveland | 6 ft 6 in (1.98 m) | 225 lb (102 kg) | So | Elsik | Houston, TX |
| F | 32 | Michael Yahnke | 6 ft 7 in (2.01 m) | 220 lb (100 kg) | Fr | Delano | Delano, MN |
| G | 33 | Neo Sanchez | 6 ft 0 in (1.83 m) | 178 lb (81 kg) | Jr | PSJA North; Paris | Pharr, TX |

Head coach

- Ryan Marks (USC)

Assistant coach(es)

- Tim Anderson (Oklahoma Panhandle State)
- Nick Bennett (UW–Stevens Point)
- Joel Weiss (Claremont McKenna)

Legend

- (C) Team captain
- (S) Suspended
- (I) Ineligible
- (W) Walk-on
- Injured
- Current redshirt

== Schedule and results ==
- All times are Central

| Date time, TV | Rank^{#} | Opponent^{#} | Result | Record | Site (attendance) city, state |
Regular season
| 11/11/2011*; 8:00pm | | at DePaul | L 72–91 | 0–1 | Allstate Arena (4,001); Chicago, IL |
| 11/13/2011*; 6:00pm, BTN | | at Northwestern | L 36–60 | 0–2 | Welsh-Ryan Arena (3,613); Evanston, IL |
| 11/18/2011*; 7:00pm | | USC Upstate; UTPA Tip-Off Classic | L 66–70 | 0–3 | UTPA Fieldhouse (478); Edinburg, TX |
| 11/19/2011*; 7:00pm | | Texas State; UTPA Tip-Off Classic | W 79–77 | 1–3 | UTPA Fieldhouse (347); Edinburg, TX |
| 11/20/2011*; 7:00pm | | Toledo; UTPA Tip-Off Classic | L 54–64 | 1–4 | UTPA Fieldhouse (237); Edinburg, TX |
| 11/22/2011*; 7:00pm | | Victory; UTPA Tip-Off Classic | W 83–64 | 2–4 | UTPA Fieldhouse (223); Edinburg, TX |
| 11/25/2011*; 7:00pm | | at USC Upstate | L 63–78 | 2–5 | G. B. Hodge Center (409); Spartanburg, SC |
| 11/28/2011*; 7:00pm | | at UT–Arlington | L 60–92 | 2–6 | Texas Hall (440); Arlington, TX |
| 12/03/2011*; 11:00 am | | at No. 2 Ohio State | L 35–64 | 2–7 | Value City Arena (14,041); Columbus, OH |
| 12/05/2011*; 7:00 pm | | at Lamar | L 49–60 | 2–8 | Montagne Center (2,467); Beaumont, TX |
| 12/10/2011*; 7:00 pm | | Texas A&M International | W 77–61 | 3–8 | UTPA Fieldhouse (313); Edinburg, TX |
| 12/15/2011*; 7:00 pm | | Wentworth Institute | W 65–48 | 4–8 | UTPA Fieldhouse (444); Edinburg, TX |
| 12/18/2011*; 1:00 pm | | at Army | L 59–61 | 4–9 | Christl Arena (537); West Point, NY |
| 12/21/2011*; 6:00 pm, ESPN3 | | at St. John's | L 61–66 | 4–10 | Carnesecca Arena (3,821); Queens, NY |
| 12/29/2011*; 7:00 pm | | UT–Arlington | L 56–83 | 4–11 | UTPA Fieldhouse (512); Edinburg, TX |
| 12/31/2011*; 1:00 pm | | Tulane | L 42–53 | 4–12 | UTPA Fieldhouse (467); Edinburg, TX |
| 01/03/2012*; 7:00 pm | | No. 20 (D3) Oswego State | W 59–54 | 5–12 | UTPA Fieldhouse (309); Edinburg, TX |
| 01/07/2012*; 9:00 pm | | at Cal State Bakersfield | L 57–72 | 5–13 | Rabobank Arena (1,184); Bakersfield, CA |
| 01/09/2012*; 8:00 pm | | at Air Force | L 50–67 | 5–14 | Clune Arena (869); Colorado Springs, CO |
| 01/11/2012*; 7:00 pm | | at TCU | L 58–88 | 5–15 | Daniel–Meyer Coliseum (3,882); Ft. Worth, TX |
| 01/19/2012; 7:00 pm | | at Chicago State | W 72–65 | 6–15 (1–0) | Emil and Patricia Jones Convocation Center (234); Chicago, IL |
| 01/21/2012; 1:00 pm | | at NJIT | L 57–58 | 6–16 (1–1) | Fleisher Center (200); Newark, NJ |
| 01/28/2012; 7:00 pm | | Houston Baptist | W 81–71 | 7–16 (2–1) | UTPA Fieldhouse (823); Edinburg, TX |
| 02/02/2012; 7:00 pm | | Utah Valley | L 69–77 | 7–17 (2–2) | UTPA Fieldhouse (961); Edinburg, TX |
| 02/04/2012; 7:00 pm | | North Dakota | W 70–58 | 8–17 (3–2) | UTPA Fieldhouse (643); Edinburg, TX |
| 02/08/2012*; 7:00 pm | | Cal State Bakersfield | W 72–57 | 9–17 | UTPA Fieldhouse (1,184); Edinburg, TX |
| 02/16/2012; 7:00 pm | | NJIT | W 75–67 | 10–17 (4–2) | UTPA Fieldhouse (1,104); Edinburg, TX |
| 02/18/2012; 7:00 pm | | Chicago State | W 74–70 | 11–17 (5–2) | UTPA Fieldhouse (1,784); Edinburg, TX |
| 02/25/2012; 7:00 pm, UVU-TV | | at Utah Valley | L 64–74 | 11–18 (5–3) | UCCU Center (6,602); Orem, UT |
| 02/27/2012; 7:00 pm, FCS Central | | at North Dakota | L 60–86 | 11–19 (5–4) | Betty Engelstad Sioux Center (1,496); Grand Forks, ND |
| 03/03/2012; 7:00 pm | | at Houston Baptist | L 58–65 | 11–20 (5–5) | Sharp Gymnasium (827); Houston, TX |
2012 Great West Conference men's basketball tournament
| 03/09/2012; 2:30 pm | | vs. North Dakota; Semifinal | L 53–69 | 11–21 | Emil and Patricia Jones Convocation Center (N/A); Chicago, IL |
*Non-conference game. ^{#}Rankings from AP Poll. (#) Tournament seedings in parentheses.
