= 2012 Great West Conference men's basketball tournament =

- Classification: Division I
- Season: 2011–12
- Teams: 5
- Site: Emil and Patricia Jones Convocation Center; Chicago, IL
- Champions: North Dakota (2nd title)
- Winning coach: Brian Jones (2nd title)
- MVP: Jamal Webb (North Dakota)

2011–12 Great West Conference men's basketball standings
	Conf.				Overall
Team	W		L	PCT	W		L	PCT
Utah Valley	9	–	1	.900	20	–	13	.606
North Dakota †	6	–	4	.600	17	–	15	.531
Texas-Pan American	5	–	5	.500	11	–	21	.344
NJIT	5	–	5	.500	15	–	17	.469
Houston Baptist	3	–	7	.300	10	–	20	.333
* Chicago State	2	–	8	.200	4	–	26	.133
† 2012 Great West tournament winner As of March 14, 2012; Rankings from AP Poll * Ineligible for conference tournament

The 2012 Great West Conference men's basketball tournament was held March 8–10, 2012, in Chicago, Illinois. at the Emil and Patricia Jones Convocation Center. Per NCAA regulations as a new Division I conference, the Great West champion did not receive an automatic bid into the NCAA tournament; however, the winner received an automatic bid to the CollegeInsider.com Tournament.

== Format ==
With South Dakota joining The Summit League for the 2011-12 season, a new format was used for the 2012 tournament.

Five teams qualified for the 2012 Great West tournament (Chicago State did not compete in the 2012 Great West tournament due to failing to meet the NCAA's Academic Progress Rate requirements, leading to a postseason ban).

== Bracket ==
The entire tournament was streamed online by Sidearm Sports at http://www.gocsucougars.com/showcase/#liveevents%5B%5D.

First round March 8, 2012
4	NJIT	65
5	Houston Baptist	64

Semifinal round March 9, 2012
1	Utah Valley	78 ^{OT}
4	NJIT	88
2	North Dakota	63
3	Texas–Pan American	59

Championship round March 10, 2012
4	NJIT	60
2	North Dakota	75

== Game summaries ==
Mar 8
2:30 pm

Recap

NJIT Highlanders 65, Houston Baptist Huskies 64
Scoring by half: 29-29, 36-35
Pts: Isaiah Wilkerson 20; Rebs: 3 tied with 5 Asts: Chris Flores 6	Pts: Tyler Russell 17; Rebs: 2 tied with 6 Asts: Joe Latas 4

Emil and Patricia Jones Convocation Center
Chicago, IL
Attendance: N/A
Referees: Lamar Simpson, Ryan Holmes, Scott Young

Mar 9
12:00 pm

Recap

Utah Valley Wolverines 78, NJIT Highlanders 88 (OT)
Scoring by half: 35-28, 34-41 Overtime: 9-19
Pts: Isiah Williams 26; Rebs: Geddes Robinson 16; Asts: 2 tied with 4	Pts: Chris Flores 27; Rebs: Ryan Woods 6 Asts: Chris Flores 5

Emil and Patricia Jones Convocation Center
Chicago, IL
Attendance: N/A
Referees: Rob Crieger, Bill Neketis, Kyle Ingram

Mar 9
2:30 pm

Recap

North Dakota Fighting Sioux 63, UTPA Broncs 59
Scoring by half: 23-37, 40-22
Pts: Jamal Webb 19; Rebs: Brandon Brekke 9 Asts: 2 tied with 3	Pts: Brandon Provost 17; Rebs: Jesus Delgado 7 Asts: Jared Maree 3

Emil and Patricia Jones Convocation Center
Chicago, IL
Attendance: N/A
Referees: Ron Olesiak, Tom O'Neil Jr., Tyler Holmes

Mar 10
4:00 pm

Recap

NJIT Highlanders 60, North Dakota Fighting Sioux 75
Scoring by half: 29-27, 31-48
Pts: Isaiah Wilkerson 19; Rebs: Isaiah Wilkerson 11; Asts: Chris Flores 3	Pts: Troy Huff 15; Rebs: Troy Huff 8 Asts: 2 tied with 4

Emil and Patricia Jones Convocation Center
Chicago, IL
Attendance: N/A
Referees: Kyle Ingram, Rick O'Neil
