= 2011–12 Utah Valley Wolverines men's basketball team =

American college basketball season

2011–12 Utah Valley Wolverines men's basketball

Great West Regular Season Champions

CIT, First Round
- Conference: Great West Conference
- Record: 20–13 (9–1 Great West)
- Head coach: Dick Hunsaker (10th season)
- Assistant coaches: Mike Kelly; Steve Payne; Paul Moss
- Home arena: UCCU Center

2011–12 Great West Conference men's basketball standings
	Conf.				Overall
Team	W		L	PCT	W		L	PCT
Utah Valley	9	–	1	.900	20	–	13	.606
North Dakota †	6	–	4	.600	17	–	15	.531
Texas-Pan American	5	–	5	.500	11	–	21	.344
NJIT	5	–	5	.500	15	–	17	.469
Houston Baptist	3	–	7	.300	10	–	20	.333
* Chicago State	2	–	8	.200	4	–	26	.133
† 2012 Great West tournament winner As of March 14, 2012; Rankings from AP Poll * Ineligible for conference tournament

The 2011–12 Utah Valley Wolverines men's basketball team represented Utah Valley University in the 2011–12 college basketball season. This was head coach Dick Hunsaker's tenth season at UVU. The Wolverines played their home games at the UCCU Center and are members of the Great West Conference. They finished the season 20–13, 9–1 in Great West play to be crowned regular season champions. They lost in the semifinals of the Great West Basketball tournament in overtime to NJIT. They were invited to the 2012 CollegeInsider.com Tournament where they lost in the first round to Weber State.

== Roster ==
2011–12 Utah Valley Wolverines men's basketball team
Players
Coaches

Pos.	#	Name	Height	Weight	Year	Previous school	Hometown
G	2	Isiah Williams	6 ft 1 in (1.85 m)	—	Sr	Farragut; Eastern Utah	Chicago, IL
G	3	Keawe Enos	6 ft 1 in (1.85 m)	—	So	Red Mountain; Mesa CC	Mesa, AZ
G	5	Kevin Woods	6 ft 1 in (1.85 m)	—	Sr	Chicago Leo Catholic	Bloomington, IL
G	12	Holton Hunsaker	6 ft 0 in (1.83 m)	—	So	Woods Cross	North Salt Lake City, UT
F	15	Geddes Robinson	6 ft 5 in (1.96 m)	230 lb (104 kg)	Sr	God's Academy; Western Nebraska	Bronx, NY
F	20	Alfonzo Hubbard	6 ft 4 in (1.93 m)	—	Jr	Gallup; Salt Lake Community College	Gallup, NM
F	24	Zach Jones	6 ft 8 in (2.03 m)	—	Jr	Arcadia; Central Arizona	Phoenix, AZ
G	32	Taylor Brown	6 ft 5 in (1.96 m)	—	So	Alta	Draper, UT
F	33	Keith Thompson	6 ft 6 in (1.98 m)	—	Sr	Mayfair; Citrus College	Bellflower, CA
C	34	Ben Aird	6 ft 9 in (2.06 m)	—	So	Bountiful	Bountiful, UT
C	42	Rory Fannon	6 ft 9 in (2.06 m)	—	Sr	Westlake Boys	Milford, New Zealand
C	45	Will Sinclair	6 ft 8 in (2.03 m)	—	Fr	Lilydale Heights College	Lilydale, Victoria

Head coach

- Dick Hunsaker (Weber State)

Assistant coach(es)

- Mike Kelly (Westmont)
- Steve Payne (Ball State)
- Paul Moss (Utah)

Legend

- (C) Team captain
- (S) Suspended
- (I) Ineligible
- (W) Walk-on
- Injured
- Current redshirt

== Schedule and results ==
Date time, TV	Rank^{#}	Opponent^{#}	Result	Record	High points	High rebounds	High assists	Site (attendance) city, state
Regular season
11/11/2011*; 4:30pm		Simpson	W 80–53	1–0	21 – Williams	12 – Robinson	8 – Woods	UCCU Center (1,014); Orem, UT
11/14/2011*; 6:00pm		at Houston	L 71–84	1–1	19 – Williams	14 – Robinson	4 – Williams	Hofheinz Pavilion (3,007); Houston, TX
11/16/2011*; 7:05pm, UVU-TV		Grambling State	W 64–34	2–1	12 – (2 tied)	8 – Hubbard	3 – (2 tied)	UCCU Center (1,016); Orem, UT
11/19/2011*; 7:05pm, UVU-TV; FCS Pacific		UMKC; Homecoming	W 78–54	3–1	17 – Williams	13 – Robinson	3 – (2 tied)	UCCU Center (6,437); Orem, UT
11/22/2011*; 6:00pm		at Arkansas	L 59–67	3–2	13 – Thompson	15 – Robinson	4 – (2 tied)	Bud Walton Arena (7,200); Fayetteville, AR
11/25/2011*; 5:00pm		at Oakland	L 83–89	3–3	35 – Williams	11 – Robinson	3 – (2 tied)	Athletics Center O'rena (2,035); Rochester, MI
11/28/2011*; 7:05pm, UVU-TV		Northern Illinois	W 58–47	4–3	15 – Williams	11 – Robinson	3 – Hunsaker	UCCU Center (1,044); Orem, UT
11/30/2011*; 7:00pm		at Wyoming	L 41–74	4–4	10 – Hubbard	6 – Hubbard	2 – Hunsaker	Arena-Auditorium (4,137); Laramie, WY
12/02/2011*; 7:05pm		Haskell Indian Nations	W 84–49	5–4	14 – Hubbard	9 – Robinson	5 – Hunsaker	UCCU Center (1,213); Orem, UT
12/06/2011*; 7:00pm, KCSG; ESPN3		at Utah State	L 54–63	5–5	16 – Williams	9 – Robinson	3 – Williams	Smith Spectrum (10,141); Logan, UT
12/10/2011*; 7:05pm, UVU-TV		Portland State	W 93–87	6–5	26 – Hunsaker	5 – (2 tied)	3 – (2 tied)	UCCU Center (2,220); Orem, UT
12/17/2011*; 7:05pm, UVU-TV		Georgia State	L 68–71	6–6	16 – Robinson	17 – Robinson	5 – Williams	UCCU Center (3,088); Orem, UT
12/19/2011*; 5:00pm		at Maine	L 60–77	6–7	13 – Aird	8 – Aird	3 – (2 tied)	Memorial Gym (1,239); Orono, ME
12/22/2011*; 7:00pm		at Montana	L 52–65	6–8	12 – Aird	10 – Robinson	4 – Woods	Dahlberg Arena (2,591); Missoula, MT
12/29/2011*; 2:30pm		vs. Hampton; Dr. Pepper Classic at Chattanooga	W 42–40	7–8	15 – Aird	13 – Robinson	2 – (3 tied)	McKenzie Arena (N/A); Chattanooga, TN
12/30/2011*; 5:00 pm		at Chattanooga; Dr. Pepper Classic at Chattanooga Championship	L 59–74	7–9	21 – Hunsaker	11 – Robinson	8 – Williams	McKenzie Arena (2,652); Chattanooga, TN
01/03/2012*; 7:05pm, Altitude; FCS Pacific		Wyoming	L 70–76	7–10	23 – Williams	11 – Robinson	5 – Hunsaker	UCCU Center (6,556); Orem, UT
01/07/2012*; 7:05pm, UVU-TV		Seattle	W 77–72	8–10	22 – Williams	12 – Aird	6 – Hunsaker	UCCU Center (2,486); Orem, UT
01/13/2012*; 8:10pm		at Seattle	W 84–74	9–10	19 – Williams	13 – Robinson	6 – Hunsaker	KeyArena (2,363); Seattle, WA
01/16/2012*; 7:05pm		Saint Mary	W 98–72	10–10	18 – Aird	12 – Robinson	9 – Hunsaker	UCCU Center (1,426); Orem, UT
01/21/2012; 7:05pm, UVU-TV		North Dakota	W 72–64	11–10 (1–0)	17 – Hubbard	13 – Robinson	6 – Hunsaker	UCCU Center (2,512); Orem, UT
01/26/2012; 7:05pm, UVU-TV		Chicago State	W 65–56	12–10 (2–0)	18 – Hunsaker	16 – Robinson	3 – Aird	UCCU Center (2,587); Orem, UT
01/28/2012; 7:05pm, UVU-TV		NJIT	W 81–58	13–10 (3–0)	26 – Williams	18 – Robinson	3 – (3 tied)	UCCU Center (3,623); Orem, UT
02/02/2012; 6:00pm		at Texas-Pan American	W 77–69	14–10 (4–0)	21 – Williams	9 – Robinson	5 – Hunsaker	UTPA Fieldhouse (961); Edinburg, TX
02/04/2012; 6:05pm		at Houston Baptist	W 68–66	15–10 (5–0)	13 – Aird	14 – Aird	4 – Robinson	Sharp Gymnasium (649); Houston, TX
02/09/2012; 5:00pm		at NJIT	W 99–97 ^{2OT}	16–10 (6–0)	24 – (2 tied)	11 – Aird	5 – (2 tied)	Fleisher Center (N/A); Newark, NJ
02/11/2012; 1:05pm		at Chicago State	W 66–61	17–10 (7–0)	16 – Hunsaker	11 – Aird	3 – Thompson	Emil and Patricia Jones Convocation Center (328); Chicago, IL
02/13/2012*; 7:05pm		Montana Tech	W 70–60	18–10	25 – Aird	10 – Aird	6 – Hunsaker	UCCU Center (2,678); Orem, UT
02/23/2012; 7:05pm, UVU-TV		Houston Baptist	W 75–56	19–10 (8–0)	15 – Williams	8 – Robinson	9 – Hunsaker	UCCU Center (2,733); Orem, UT
02/25/2012; 7:05pm, UVU-TV		Texas-Pan American	W 74–64	20–10 (9–0)	28 – Williams	16 – Robinson	2 – Aird, Hubbard, Hunsaker, and Woods II	UCCU Center (6,602); Orem, UT
03/03/2012; 1:00pm		at North Dakota	L 56–57	20–11 (9–1)	14 – Aird	9 – Robinson	6 – Hunsaker	Betty Engelstad Sioux Center (1,903); Grand Forks, ND
2012 Great West Conference Tournament
03/09/2012; 11:00am		vs. NJIT; Semifinals	L 78–88 ^{OT}	20–12	26 – Williams	16 – Robinson	4 – Hunsaker & Williams	Emil and Patricia Jones Convocation Center (N/A); Chicago, IL
2012 CollegeInsider.com Postseason Tournament
03/13/2012*; 7:00pm		at Weber State; First Round	L 69–72	20–13	26 – Williams	11 – Robinson	4 – Robinson	Dee Events Center (2,334); Ogden, UT
*Non-conference game. ^{#}Rankings from AP Poll. (#) Tournament seedings in parentheses.
