= 2011–12 University of North Dakota men's basketball team =

American college basketball season

2011–12 University of North Dakota men's basketball

Great West tournament champions

CIT, First Round
- Conference: Great West Conference
- Record: 17–15 (6–4 Great West)
- Head coach: Brian Jones (6th season)
- Assistant coaches: Bryan Martin; Gameli Ahelegbe; Dean Oliver
- Home arena: Betty Engelstad Sioux Center; Ralph Engelstad Arena

2011–12 Great West Conference men's basketball standings
	Conf.				Overall
Team	W		L	PCT	W		L	PCT
Utah Valley	9	–	1	.900	20	–	13	.606
North Dakota †	6	–	4	.600	17	–	15	.531
Texas-Pan American	5	–	5	.500	11	–	21	.344
NJIT	5	–	5	.500	15	–	17	.469
Houston Baptist	3	–	7	.300	10	–	20	.333
* Chicago State	2	–	8	.200	4	–	26	.133
† 2012 Great West tournament winner As of March 14, 2012; Rankings from AP Poll * Ineligible for conference tournament

The 2011–12 University of North Dakota men's basketball team represented the University of North Dakota during the 2011–12 NCAA Division I men's basketball season. They were led by sixth year head coach Brian Jones, played their home games at the Betty Engelstad Sioux Center, with one home game at Ralph Engelstad Arena, and are members of the Great West Conference. They were champions of the Great West Basketball tournament for the second consecutive year and earned an automatic bid into the 2012 CollegeInsider.com Tournament where they lost in the first round to Drake.

This season North Dakota officially played without a mascot name after the decision to retire "Fighting Sioux" as the school's mascot amid controversy. However, the school is fighting to keep the mascot name and some continue to use it.

This was also North Dakota's final year as a member of the Great West as they became a full member of the Big Sky Conference in July 2012.

== Roster ==
Number	Name	Position	Height	Weight	Year	Hometown
0	Aaron Anderson	Guard	5–10	150	Sophomore	Brooklyn Park, Minnesota
2	Nick Haugen	Guard	6–2	200	Junior	Rockford, Minnesota
3	Lenny Antwi	Guard	6–1	173	Freshman	Montreal, Quebec
4	Mike Mathison	Center	6–10	265	Senior	Walhalla, North Dakota
5	Troy Huff	Guard/Forward	6–4	175	Sophomore	Milwaukee, Wisconsin
10	Shane Benton	Guard	6–3	195	Freshman	Cedar Rapids, Iowa
11	Jamal Webb	Guard	6–1	185	Sophomore	Buffalo, New York
12	Jordan Allard	Guard	6–7	225	Junior	Fargo, North Dakota
20	Josh Gentry	Guard	6–4	170	Freshman	Indianapolis, Indiana
22	Mitch Wilmer	Center	6–11	245	Junior	Warroad, Minnesota
23	Spencer Goodman	Forward	6–5	185	Junior	Jackson, Missouri
24	Brandon Brekke	Forward/Center	6–8	215	Sophomore	East Grand Forks, Minnesota
32	Josh Schuler	Guard	6–2	187	Sophomore	Urbana, Ohio
33	Doug Archer	Forward/Center	6–8	210	Junior	Conception Junction, Missouri
40	Dan Stockdale	Forward	6–8	180	Junior	Sheboygan, Wisconsin
45	Patrick Mitchell	Guard	6–8	220	Senior	Des Moines, Iowa

== Schedule ==
Date time, TV	Rank^{#}	Opponent^{#}	Result	Record	Site (attendance) city, state
Exhibition
October 30, 2011*; 3:00 pm		at Minot State	W 80–60	—	MSU Dome (1,340); Minot, ND
Regular season
November 12, 2011*; 3:00 pm		Waldorf	W 93–62	1–0	Betty Engelstad Sioux Center (1,642); Grand Forks, ND
November 14, 2011*; 8:00 pm		Idaho State	W 63–47	2–0	Betty Engelstad Sioux Center (1,645); Grand Forks, ND
November 19, 2011*; 7:00 pm		at Bradley	L 69–78	2–1	Carver Arena (7,777); Peoria, IL
November 23, 2011*; 7:00 pm, FCS Central		Montana	W 88–81 ^{OT}	3–1	Betty Engelstad Sioux Center (1,760); Grand Forks, ND
November 26, 2011*; 2:00 pm		Western Illinois	L 62–65	3–2	Betty Engelstad Sioux Center (1,566); Grand Forks, ND
November 30, 2011*; 7:00 pm		Jamestown	W 74–66	4–2	Betty Engelstad Sioux Center (1,509); Grand Forks, ND
December 3, 2011*; 8:00 pm		at Idaho State	L 63–76	4–3	Holt Arena (2,001); Pocatello, ID
December 7, 2011*; 7:00 pm		at UMKC	L 75–78	4–4	Swinney Recreation Center (1,131); Kansas City, MO
December 10, 2011*; 7:30 pm		at South Dakota State	L 54–92	4–5	Frost Arena (4,104); Brookings, SD
December 15, 2011*; 7:00 pm		South Dakota State	W 89–70	5–5	Betty Engelstad Sioux Center (1,495); Grand Forks, ND
December 18, 2011*; 7:00 pm		at Sacramento State	L 64–75	5–6	Colberg Court (406); Sacramento, CA
December 22, 2011*; 7:00 pm		at Western Illinois	L 46–68	5–7	Western Hall (426); Macomb, IL
December 31, 2011*; 3:00 pm, ESPNU		at No. 17 Kansas	L 58–84	5–8	Allen Fieldhouse (16,300); Lawrence, KS
January 4, 2012*; 7:00 pm		Mayville State	W 72–54	6–8	Betty Engelstad Sioux Center (1,508); Grand Forks, ND
January 7, 2012*; 2:30 pm		at New Mexico	L 57–85	6–9	The Pit (14,094); Albuquerque, NM
January 12, 2012*; 8:00 pm		Valley City State	W 69–46	7–9	Betty Engelstad Sioux Center (2,021); Grand Forks, ND
January 17, 2012*; 7:00 pm, FCS		North Dakota State	W 59–54	8–9	Ralph Engelstad Arena (7,169); Grand Forks, ND
January 21, 2012; 9:00 pm		at Utah Valley	L 64–72	8–10 (0–1)	UCCU Center (2,512); Orem, UT
January 26, 2012; 7:00 pm, FCS Atlantic		NJIT	W 80–63	9–10 (1–1)	Betty Engelstad Sioux Center (1,498); Grand Forks, ND
January 28, 2012; 7:00 pm		Chicago State	W 71–61	10–10 (2–1)	Betty Engelstad Sioux Center (1,844); Grand Forks, ND
February 2, 2012; 7:00 pm		at Houston Baptist	L 62–69	10–11 (2–2)	Sharp Gymnasium (1,844); Houston, TX
February 4, 2012; 7:00 pm		at Texas-Pan American	L 58–70	10–12 (2–3)	UTPA Fieldhouse (643); Edinburg, TX
February 9, 2012; 7:00 pm		at Chicago State	W 75–69	11–12 (3–3)	Emil and Patricia Jones Convocation Center (126); Chicago, IL
February 11, 2012; 1:00 pm		at NJIT	L 57–72	11–13 (3–4)	Fleisher Center (553); Newark, NJ
February 16, 2012*; 8:00 pm		at Louisiana Tech	L 53–58	11–14	Thomas Assembly Center (4,071); Ruston, LA
February 18, 2012*; 1:00 pm		at Longwood	W 67–59	12–14	Willett Hall (718); Farmville, VA
February 25, 2012; 4:00 pm, FCS Central		Houston Baptist	W 66–62	13–14 (4–4)	Betty Engelstad Sioux Center (1,576); Grand Forks, ND
February 27, 2012; 7:00 pm, FCS Central		Texas-Pan American	W 86–60	14–14 (5–4)	Betty Engelstad Sioux Center (1,496); Grand Forks, ND
March 3, 2012; 2:00 pm		Utah Valley	W 57–56	15–14 (6–4)	Betty Engelstad Sioux Center (1,903); Grand Forks, ND
Great West tournament
March 9, 2012; 2:30 pm	(2)	vs. (3) Texas–Pan American; Semifinals	W 63–59	16–14	Emil and Patricia Jones Convocation Center (NA); Chicago, IL
March 10, 2012; 4:00 pm	(2)	vs. (4) NJIT; Championship Game	W 75–60	17–14	Emil and Patricia Jones Convocation Center (NA); Chicago, IL
CollegeInsider.com tournament
March 14, 2012*; 7:00 pm		at Drake; First Round	L 64–70	17–15	Knapp Center (1,829); Des Moines, IA
*Non-conference game. ^{#}Rankings from AP Poll. (#) Tournament seedings in parentheses. All times are in Central Time.
