= 2009–10 Weber State Wildcats men's basketball team =

American college basketball season

2009–10 Weber State Wildcats men's basketball

Big Sky Regular Season Champions

NIT, First Round
- Conference: Big Sky Conference
- Record: 20–11 (13–3 Big Sky)
- Head coach: Randy Rahe
- Assistant coaches: Eric Duft; Tim Gardner; Charles Harral
- Home arena: Dee Events Center

2009–10 Big Sky men's basketball standings
| | Conf. | | | | Overall |
| Team | W | | L | PCT | W | | L | PCT |
|---|---|---|---|---|---|---|---|---|
| Weber State | 13 | – | 3 | .813 | 20 | – | 11 | .645 |
| Northern Colorado | 12 | – | 4 | .750 | 25 | – | 7 | .781 |
| Montana State | 10 | – | 6 | .625 | 15 | – | 14 | .517 |
| Montana † | 10 | – | 6 | .625 | 22 | – | 9 | .710 |
| Northern Arizona | 8 | – | 8 | .500 | 14 | – | 14 | .500 |
| Portland State | 7 | – | 9 | .438 | 12 | – | 19 | .387 |
| Eastern Washington | 5 | – | 11 | .313 | 9 | – | 21 | .300 |
| Idaho State | 4 | – | 12 | .250 | 7 | – | 22 | .241 |
| Sacramento State | 3 | – | 13 | .188 | 9 | – | 21 | .300 |
† Conference tournament winner

The 2009–10 Weber State Wildcats men's basketball team represented Weber State University during the 2009–10 NCAA Division I men's basketball season. This was head coach Randy Rahe's fourth season at Weber State. The Wildcats competed in the Big Sky Conference and played their home games at the Dee Events Center.

Weber State won the Big Sky regular season championship for the third time in the last four years and as the champion hosted the semifinals and championship game of the 2010 Big Sky men's basketball tournament. The Wildcats lost to Montana in the championship game and were invited to the 2010 National Invitation Tournament where they lost in the first round for the second consecutive year.

== Roster ==
| # | Name | Height | Weight (lbs.) | Position | Class | Hometown | Previous Team(s) |
|---|---|---|---|---|---|---|---|
| 1 | Damian Lillard | 6'2" | 185 | G | So. | Oakland, CA | Oakland HS |
| 3 | Kyle Bullinger | 6'6" | 215 | F | So. | Mountain View, WY | Mountain View HS |
| 11 | Dee Crandall | 6'2" | 170 | G | Fr. | Salt Lake City, UT | Judge Memorial Catholic HS |
| 12 | Nick Hansen | 6'4" | 200 | G | Sr. | Pocatello, ID | Pocatello HS; College of Southern Idaho |
| 15 | Lindsey Hughey | 6'3" | 200 | G | Jr. | Grand Prairie, TX | South Grand Prairie HS; Seminole State |
| 20 | Pablo Coro | 6'3" | 190 | G | Fr. | Osorno, Chile | Juan Diego Catholic HS |
| 21 | Josh Noble | 6'2" | 195 | G/F | Jr. | Brooklyn, NY | Hillcrest High School HS; Snead State CC |
| 23 | Franklin Session | 6'2" | 175 | G/F | Jr. | Los Angeles, CA | Jordan HS; Saddleback CC |
| 25 | Byron Fulton | 6'7" | 220 | F | Fr. | Phoenix, AZ | St. Mary's HS |
| 30 | Darin Mahoney | 6'8" | 225 | F | So. | Heber City, UT | Wasatch HS |
| 33 | Matt Washington | 6'7" | 210 | F | Jr. | New Orleans, LA | John Ehret HS; West Hills College Coalinga |
| 40 | Blake Davis | 6'5" | 210 | F | Fr. | Phoenix, AZ | St. Mary's HS |
| 45 | Steve Panos | 6'8" | 240 | C | Sr. | Salt Lake City, UT | Highland HS |
| 55 | Tevor Morris | 6'9" | 240 | C | Jr. | Nampa, ID | Nampa HS |

== Schedule and results ==
- All times are Mountain

| Date time, TV | Rank^{#} | Opponent^{#} | Result | Record | Site (attendance) city, state |
Exhibition
| 11/2/2009*; 7:00pm | | Colorado–Colorado Springs | W 110–58 | | Dee Events Center (NA); Ogden, UT |
| 11/7/2009*; 7:00pm | | Colorado Christian | W 75–65 | | Dee Events Center (NA); Ogden, UT |
Regular Season
| 11/13/2009*; 7:30pm | | Utah State; Old Oquirrh Bucket | L 66–60 | 0–1 | Dee Events Center (9,272); Ogden, UT |
| 11/17/2009*; 8:00pm | | at UC Santa Barbara | L 66–57 | 0–2 | UC Santa Barbara Events Center (2,021); Santa Barbara, CA |
| 11/22/2009*; 3:00pm | | at Seattle | L 91–87 | 0–3 | KeyArena (2,213); Seattle, WA |
| 11/24/2009*; 7:00pm | | Western State | W 89–62 | 1–3 | Dee Events Center (3,354); Ogden, UT |
| 11/27/2009*; 7:30pm | | at BYU; Old Oquirrh Bucket | L 87–70 | 1–4 | Marriott Center (11,892); Provo, UT |
| 12/2/2009*; 7:00pm | | Utah; Old Oquirrh Bucket | W 83–76 | 2–4 | Dee Events Center (5,779); Ogden, UT |
| 12/5/2009; 8:00pm | | at Sacramento State | W 80–65 | 3–4 (1–0) | Colberg Court (703); Sacramento, CA |
| 12/9/2009*; 7:30pm | | Montana Tech | W 73–70 | 4–4 | Dee Events Center (3,383); Ogden, UT |
| 12/12/2009*; 7:00pm | | Southern Utah; Old Oquirrh Bucket | W 84–66 | 5–4 | Dee Events Center (3,518); Ogden, UT |
| 12/17/2009*; 8:00pm | | at UNLV | L 73–62 | 5–5 | Thomas & Mack Center (15,715); Las Vegas, NV |
| 12/21/2009*; 5:30pm | | vs. Cal State Fullerton; Basketball Travelers Invitational | W 82–71 | 6–5 | Smith Spectrum (708); Logan, UT |
| 12/22/2009*; 5:30pm | | vs. Morehead State; Basketball Travelers Invitational | W 66–64 | 7–5 | Smith Spectrum (1,187); Logan, UT |
| 12/23/2009*; 8:00pm | | at Utah State; Basketball Travelers Invitational | L 85–73 | 7–6 | Smith Spectrum (9,427); Logan, UT |
| 12/31/2010; 3:00pm | | Montana State | W 75–62 | 8–6 (2–0) | Dee Events Center (4,182); Ogden, UT |
| 1/2/2010; 7:00pm | | Montana | W 64–56 | 9–6 (3–0) | Dee Events Center (4,490); Ogden, UT |
| 1/7/2010; 7:00pm | | at Northern Colorado | L 84–75 | 9–7 (3–1) | Butler–Hancock Sports Pavilion (1,340); Greeley, CO |
| 1/9/2010; 6:30pm | | at Northern Arizona | W 87–62 | 10–7 (4–1) | Walkup Skydome (982); Flagstaff, AZ |
| 1/16/2010; 7:00pm | | at Idaho State | W 95–93 ^{3OT} | 11–7 (5–1) | Holt Arena (2,923); Pocatello, ID |
| 1/22/2010; 7:00pm | | Portland State | W 86–83 | 12–7 (6–1) | Dee Events Center (6,011); Ogden, UT |
| 1/23/2010; 7:00pm | | Eastern Washington | W 89–67 | 13–7 (7–1) | Dee Events Center (5,728); Ogden, UT |
| 1/29/2010; 7:00pm | | Sacramento State | W 81–59 | 14–7 (8–1) | Dee Events Center (5,118); Ogden, UT |
| 2/5/2010; 7:00pm | | at Montana | L 75–61 | 14–8 (8–2) | Dahlberg Arena (4,557); Missoula, MT |
| 2/6/2010; 7:00pm | | at Montana State | W 75–71 | 15–8 (9–2) | Worthington Arena (3,686); Bozeman, MT |
| 2/12/2010; 7:00pm | | Northern Arizona | W 76–66 | 16–8 (10–2) | Dee Events Center (5,791); Ogden, UT |
| 2/13/2010; 7:00pm | | Northern Colorado | W 81–76 | 17–8 (11–2) | Dee Events Center (5,819); Ogden, UT |
| 2/20/2010; 7:00pm, Altitude | | Idaho State | W 89–64 | 18–8 (12–2) | Dee Events Center (6,508); Ogden, UT |
| 2/26/2010; 8:00pm | | at Eastern Washington | W 85–57 | 19–8 (13–2) | Reese Court (2,113); Cheney, WA |
| 2/28/2010; 3:00pm, Altitude | | at Portland State | L 84–79 | 19–9 (13–3) | Peter Stott Center (1,102); Portland, OR |
2010 Big Sky men's basketball tournament
| 3/9/2010; 7:00pm | | Portland State; Semifinals | W 69–60 | 20–9 | Dee Events Center (4,387); Ogden, UT |
| 3/10/2010; 7:00pm, ESPN2 | | Montana; Finals | L 66–65 | 20–10 | Dee Events Center (6,308); Ogden, UT |
2010 National Invitation Tournament
| 3/17/2010; 5:00pm, ESPN2 | | at Cincinnati; First round | L 76–62 | 20–11 | Fifth Third Arena (2,410); Cincinnati, OH |
*Non-conference game. ^{#}Rankings from AP Poll. (#) Tournament seedings in parentheses.
