= 2009–10 Montana Grizzlies basketball team =

American college basketball season

2009–10 Montana Grizzlies basketball

Big Sky tournament champions

NCAA tournament, Round of 64
- Conference: Big Sky Conference
- Record: 22–10 (10–6 Big Sky)
- Head coach: Wayne Tinkle (4th season)
- Assistant coaches: Bill Evans; Freddie Owens; Kurt Paulson
- Home arena: Dahlberg Arena

2009–10 Big Sky men's basketball standings
	Conf.				Overall
Team	W		L	PCT	W		L	PCT
Weber State	13	–	3	.813	20	–	11	.645
Northern Colorado	12	–	4	.750	25	–	7	.781
Montana State	10	–	6	.625	15	–	14	.517
Montana †	10	–	6	.625	22	–	9	.710
Northern Arizona	8	–	8	.500	14	–	14	.500
Portland State	7	–	9	.438	12	–	19	.387
Eastern Washington	5	–	11	.313	9	–	21	.300
Idaho State	4	–	12	.250	7	–	22	.241
Sacramento State	3	–	13	.188	9	–	21	.300
† Conference tournament winner

The 2009–10 Montana Grizzlies basketball team represented the University of Montana during the 2009–10 NCAA Division I men's basketball season. The Grizzlies, led by fourth-year head coach Wayne Tinkle, played their home games at Dahlberg Arena and were members of the Big Sky Conference. They finished the season 22–10, 10–6 in Big Sky play to finish tied for third place in the conference regular season standings. Montana won the Big Sky Basketball tournament to earn the conference's automatic berth into the NCAA tournament where they lost in the first round to New Mexico.

== Roster ==
2009–10 Montana Grizzlies men's basketball team
Players
Coaches

Pos.	#	Name	Height	Weight	Year	Hometown
G	5	Will Cherry	6 ft 1 in (1.85 m)	177 lb (80 kg)	Fr	West Oakland, California
G	23	Anthony Johnson	6 ft 3 in (1.91 m)	210 lb (95 kg)	Sr	Tacoma, Washington

Head coach

- Wayne Tinkle

Assistant coach(es)

Legend

- (C) Team captain
- (S) Suspended
- (I) Ineligible
- (W) Walk-on
- Injured
- Current redshirt

Roster

== Schedule and results ==
Date time, TV	Rank^{#}	Opponent^{#}	Result	Record	Site (attendance) city, state
Regular season
Nov 13, 2009*		North Dakota	W 61–37	1–0	Dahlberg Arena (3,176); Missoula, Montana
Nov 14, 2009*		Boise State	W 95–82	2–0	Dahlberg Arena (3,135); Missoula, Montana
Nov 15, 2009*		Loyola Marymount	W 64–63	3–0	Dahlberg Arena (2,551); Missoula, Montana
Nov 19, 2009*		at Denver	L 49–56	3–1	Magness Arena (1,625); Denver, Colorado
Nov 23, 2009*		at Oregon	W 68–55	4–1	McArthur Court (7,095); Eugene, Oregon
Nov 29, 2009*		at No. 14 Washington	L 59–63	4–2	Bank of America Arena (8,515); Seattle, Washington
Dec 4, 2009		Northern Arizona	W 71–54	5–2 (1–0)	Dahlberg Arena (3,479); Missoula, Montana
Dec 5, 2009		Northern Colorado	L 48–59	5–3 (1–1)	Dahlberg Arena (3,308); Missoula, Montana
Dec 10, 2009*		at Loyola Marymount	W 82–73	6–3	Gersten Pavilion (1,444); Los Angeles, California
Dec 12, 2009*		at Colorado State	L 61–62	6–4	Moby Arena (2,498); Fort Collins, Colorado
Dec 16, 2009*		Montana State–Northern	W 57–43	7–4	Dahlberg Arena (2,407); Missoula, Montana
Dec 19, 2009*		UC Riverside	W 67–52	8–4	Dahlberg Arena (2,790); Missoula, Montana
Dec 21, 2009*		Fresno State	W 59–56	9–4	Dahlberg Arena (2,726); Missoula, Montana
Dec 23, 2009*		Great Falls	W 100–52	10–4	Dahlberg Arena (2,371); Missoula, Montana
Dec 31, 2009		at Idaho State	L 65–67	10–5 (1–2)	Holt Arena (1,933); Pocatello, Idaho
Jan 2, 2010		at Weber State	L 56–64	10–6 (1–3)	Dee Events Center (4,490); Ogden, Utah
Jan 8, 2010		Eastern Washington	W 79–66	11–6 (2–3)	Dahlberg Arena (3,243); Missoula, Montana
Jan 9, 2010		Portland State	W 90–58	12–6 (3–3)	Dahlberg Arena (3,276); Missoula, Montana
Jan 15, 2010		at Sacramento State	W 57–56	13–6 (4–3)	Hornets Nest (709); Sacramento, California
Jan 23, 2010		at Montana State	L 52–61	13–7 (4–4)	Worthington Arena (6,427); Bozeman, Montana
Jan 28, 2010		at Northern Colorado	W 64–62	14–7 (5–4)	Butler–Hancock Sports Pavilion (2,892); Greeley, Colorado
Jan 30, 2010		at Northern Arizona	W 84–64	15–7 (6–4)	Walkup Skydome (1,437); Flagstaff, Arizona
Feb 5, 2010		Weber State	W 75–61	16–7 (7–4)	Dahlberg Arena (4,557); Missoula, Montana
Feb 6, 2010		Idaho State	W 91–68	17–7 (8–4)	Dahlberg Arena (3,761); Missoula, Montana
Feb 12, 2010		at Portland State	W 81–76	18–7 (9–4)	Peter W. Stott Center (1,408); Portland, Oregon
Feb 14, 2010		at Eastern Washington	L 68–69	18–8 (9–5)	Reese Court (2,147); Cheney, Washington
Feb 20, 2010		Sacramento State	W 86–58	19–8 (10–5)	Dahlberg Arena (3,749); Missoula, Montana
Feb 27, 2010		Montana State	L 67–73	19–9 (10–6)	Dahlberg Arena (6,927); Missoula, Montana
Big Sky tournament
Mar 6, 2010	(4)	(5) Northern Arizona; Big Sky Quarterfinals	W 81–60	20–9	Dahlberg Arena (2,652); Missoula, Montana
Mar 9, 2010*	(4)	vs. (2) Northern Colorado; Big Sky Semifinals	W 68–63	21–9	Dee Events Center; Ogden, Utah
Mar 10, 2010*	(4)	at (1) Weber State; Big Sky Championship Game	W 66–65	22–9	Dee Events Center (6,308); Ogden, Utah
NCAA tournament
Mar 18, 2010*	(14 E)	vs. (3 E) No. 8 New Mexico; NCAA First Round	L 57–62	22–10	HP Pavilion (15,427); San Jose, California
*Non-conference game. ^{#}Rankings from AP Poll. (#) Tournament seedings in parentheses. E=NCAA East Regional. All times are in Mountain Time. Source
