= 2011–12 Montana Grizzlies basketball team =

American college basketball season

2011–12 Montana Grizzlies men's basketball

Big Sky Regular Season & tournament champions

NCAA Tournament, Round of 64
- Conference: Big Sky Conference
- Record: 25–7 (15–1 Big Sky)
- Head coach: Wayne Tinkle (6th season)
- Assistant coaches: Bill Evans; Freddie Owens; Kurt Paulson
- Home arena: Dahlberg Arena

2011–12 Big Sky men's basketball standings
	Conf.				Overall
Team	W		L	PCT	W		L	PCT
Montana †	15	–	1	.938	25	–	7	.781
Weber State	14	–	2	.875	25	–	7	.781
Portland State	10	–	6	.625	17	–	14	.548
Eastern Washington	8	–	8	.500	15	–	17	.469
Idaho State	7	–	9	.438	9	–	21	.300
Montana State	7	–	9	.438	12	–	17	.414
Northern Colorado	5	–	11	.313	9	–	19	.321
Sacramento State	5	–	11	.313	10	–	18	.357
Northern Arizona	1	–	15	.063	5	–	24	.172
† Conference tournament winner

The 2011–12 Montana Grizzlies basketball team represented the University of Montana during the 2011–12 NCAA Division I men's basketball season. The Grizzlies, led by sixth year head coach Wayne Tinkle, played their home games at Dahlberg Arena and are members of the Big Sky Conference. They finished the season 25–7, 15–1 in Big Sky play to be crowned regular season champions. They were also champions the Big Sky Basketball tournament to earn the conference's automatic berth into the NCAA tournament where they lost in the second round to Wisconsin.

== Roster ==
Number	Name	Position	Height	Weight	Year	Hometown
1	Art Steward	Forward	6–4	210	Senior	Casper, Wyoming
2	Kevin Henderson	Guard/Forward	6–5	190	Freshman	Auburn, Washington
5	Will Cherry	Guard	6–1	177	Junior	West Oakland, California
10	Jordan Gregory	Guard	6–2	185	Freshman	Pueblo, Colorado
12	Jordan Wood	Guard	6–3	200	Senior	Cedar City, Utah
20	Keron DeShields	Guard	6–2	177	Freshman	Baltimore, Maryland
22	Shawn Stockton	Guard	6–1	195	Senior	Spokane, Washington
24	Derek Selvig	Forward	7–0	230	Senior	Glendive, Montana
32	Kareem Jamar	Guard/Forward	6–5	210	Sophomore	Los Angeles, California
33	Michael Weisner	Forward	6–7	185	Freshman	Walla Walla, Washington
40	Mathias Ward	Forward	6–7	236	Junior	Gig Harbor, Washington
45	Eric Hutchison	Forward	6–9	230	Sophomore	Longview, Washington
50	Billy Reader	Forward/Center	6–9	217	Freshman	Lake Oswego, Oregon

== Schedule ==
Date time, TV	Rank^{#}	Opponent^{#}	Result	Record	Site (attendance) city, state
Exhibition
11/03/2011*; 7:00 pm		Lewis–Clark State	W 64–52		Dahlberg Arena; Missoula, MT
Regular season
11/11/2011*; 7:00 pm		at Colorado State	L 58–64	0–1	Moby Arena (4,666); Fort Collins, CO
11/14/2011*; 7:00 pm		Great Falls	W 60–59	1–1	Dahlberg Arena (2,445); Missoula, MT
11/17/2011*; 7:00 pm		Idaho	W 57–52	2–1	Dahlberg Arena (2,684); Missoula, MT
11/20/2011*; 6:00 pm		at San Diego	W 73–60	3–1	Jenny Craig Pavilion (1,659); San Diego, CA
11/28/2011*; 6:00 pm		at North Dakota	L 81–88 ^{OT}	3–2	Betty Engelstad Sioux Center (1,760); Grand Forks, ND
11/26/2011*; 7:00 pm		Long Beach State	W 73–71	4–2	Dahlberg Arena (3,529); Missoula, MT
12/01/2011*; 7:00 pm		San Francisco	L 62–65	4–3	Dahlberg Arena (3,212); Missoula, MT
12/04/2011*; 6:00 pm		at Oregon State	L 46–71	4–4	Gill Coliseum (5,518); Corvallis, OR
12/07/2011*; 7:00 pm		Montana Tech	W 64–49	5–4	Dahlberg Arena (2,835); Missoula, MT
12/10/2011*; 7:00 pm		Nevada	L 64–70	5–5	Dahlberg Arena (2,946); Missoula, MT
12/17/2011*; 8:00 pm		at Portland	W 80–65	6–5	Chiles Center (1,312); Portland, OR
12/22/2011*; 7:00 pm		Utah Valley	W 65–52	7–5	Dahlberg Arena (2,591); Missoula, MT
12/28/2011; 7:00 pm		Portland State	W 75–64	8–5 (1–0)	Dahlberg Arena (3,490); Missoula, MT
12/30/2011; 1:00 pm		Eastern Washington	W 79–71	9–5 (2–0)	Dahlberg Arena (3,363); Missoula, MT
01/07/2012; 7:00 pm		at Idaho State	W 68–44	10–5 (3–0)	Holt Arena (2,203); Pocatello, ID
01/12/2012; 6:30 pm		at Northern Arizona	W 78–53	11–5 (4–0)	Walkup Skydome (561); Flagstaff, AZ
01/14/2012; 7:00 pm		at Weber State	L 64–80	11–6 (4–1)	Dee Events Center (7,236); Ogden, UT
01/19/2012; 7:00 pm		Northern Colorado	W 76–58	12–6 (5–1)	Dahlberg Arena (2,844); Missoula, MT
01/19/2012; 7:00 pm		Sacramento State	W 85–56	13–6 (6–1)	Dahlberg Arena (3,709); Missoula, MT
01/26/2012; 7:00 pm		at Eastern Washington	W 74–60	14–6 (7–1)	Reese Court (3,512); Cheney, WA
01/29/2012; 2:00 pm		at Portland State	W 69–67	15–6 (8–1)	Stott Center (1,307); Portland, OR
02/04/2012; 7:00 pm, KPAX		at Montana State	W 67–58	16–6 (9–1)	Worthington Arena (6,018); Bozeman, MT
02/06/2012; 7:00 pm		Idaho State	W 76–40	17–6 (10–1)	Dahlberg Arena (3,444); Missoula, MT
02/09/2012; 7:00 pm		at Northern Colorado	W 75–68	18–6 (11–1)	Butler–Hancock Sports Pavilion (1,419); Greeley, CO
02/11/2012; 8:00 pm		at Sacramento State	W 67–58	19–6 (12–1)	Colberg Court (818); Sacramento, CA
02/18/2012*; 7:00 pm		Hawaiʻi; Sears BracketBusters	W 94–79	20–6	Dahlberg Arena (5,009); Missoula, MT
02/23/2012; 7:00 pm, Altitude		Northern Arizona	W 78–60	21–6 (13–1)	Dahlberg Arena (3,227); Missoula, MT
02/25/2012; 7:00 pm, KPAX		Montana State	W 57–47	22–6 (14–1)	Dahlberg Arena (7,003); Missoula, MT
02/28/2012; 7:00 pm, Altitude		Weber State	W 66–51	23–6 (15–1)	Dahlberg Arena (7,157); Missoula, MT
2012 Big Sky Conference men's basketball tournament
03/06/2012; 8:00 pm, Altitude		Eastern Washington; Semifinals	W 74–66	24–6	Dahlberg Arena (5,563); Missoula, MT
03/07/2012; 7:00 pm, ESPN2		Weber State; Championship Game	W 85–66	25–6	Dahlberg Arena (7,042); Missoula, MT
2012 NCAA tournament
03/15/2012*; 12:10 pm, TNT	No. (E 13)	vs. No. 14 (E 4) Wisconsin; Second Round	L 49–73	25–7	The Pit (10,774); Albuquerque, NM
*Non-conference game. ^{#}Rankings from AP Poll. (#) Tournament seedings in parentheses. All times are in Mountain Time (#) during NCAA Tournament is seed with Region.
