= 2011–12 Weber State Wildcats men's basketball team =

American college basketball season

2011–12 Weber State Wildcats men's basketball

CIT, Second Round
- Conference: Big Sky Conference
- Record: 25–7 (14–2 Big Sky)
- Head coach: Randy Rahe (6th season)
- Assistant coaches: Eric Duft; Phil Beckner; Tim Gardner
- Home arena: Dee Events Center

2011–12 Big Sky men's basketball standings
	Conf.				Overall
Team	W		L	PCT	W		L	PCT
Montana †	15	–	1	.938	25	–	7	.781
Weber State	14	–	2	.875	25	–	7	.781
Portland State	10	–	6	.625	17	–	14	.548
Eastern Washington	8	–	8	.500	15	–	17	.469
Idaho State	7	–	9	.438	9	–	21	.300
Montana State	7	–	9	.438	12	–	17	.414
Northern Colorado	5	–	11	.313	9	–	19	.321
Sacramento State	5	–	11	.313	10	–	18	.357
Northern Arizona	1	–	15	.063	5	–	24	.172
† Conference tournament winner

The 2011–12 Weber State Wildcats men's basketball team represented Weber State University during the 2011–12 NCAA Division I men's basketball season. The Wildcats, led by sixth year head coach Randy Rahe, played their home games at Dee Events Center and are members of the Big Sky Conference. They finished the season 25–7, 14–2 in Big Sky play to finish in second place. They lost in the championship game of the Big Sky Basketball tournament to Montana. They were invited to the 2012 CollegeInsider.com Tournament where they defeated Utah Valley in the first round before falling to Loyola Marymount in the second round.

== Roster ==
2011–12 Weber State Wildcats men's basketball team
Players
Coaches

Pos.	#	Name	Height	Weight	Year	Previous school	Hometown
G	1	Damian Lillard	6 ft 2 in (1.88 m)	195 lb (88 kg)	Jr	Oakland HS	Oakland, California
G/F	2	Shai Fields	6 ft 4 in (1.93 m)	170 lb (77 kg)	Fr		Houston, Texas
F	3	Kyle Bullinger	6 ft 6 in (1.98 m)	215 lb (98 kg)	Sr		Mountain View, Wyoming
G/F	4	Scott Bamforth	6 ft 2 in (1.88 m)	190 lb (86 kg)	Jr	Western Nebraska CC	Albuquerque, New Mexico
G	5	Jordan Richardson	6 ft 1 in (1.85 m)	185 lb (84 kg)	So		Lewisville, Texas
G	11	Gelaun Wheelwright	6 ft 1 in (1.85 m)	195 lb (88 kg)	Fr		Corona, California
G	12	Logan Foster	6 ft 3 in (1.91 m)	160 lb (73 kg)	Fr		Los Angeles, California
F	13	Frank Otis	6 ft 6 in (1.98 m)	220 lb (100 kg)	Jr		Oakland, California
G/F	20	Davion Berry	6 ft 4 in (1.93 m)	185 lb (84 kg)	Jr	Cal State Monterey Bay	Hayward, California
F	25	Byron Fulton	6 ft 7 in (2.01 m)	235 lb (107 kg)	So		Phoenix, Arizona
F	30	Darin Mahoney	6 ft 8 in (2.03 m)	225 lb (102 kg)	Sr		Heber City, Utah
G	31	Mike Brown	6 ft 2 in (1.88 m)	175 lb (79 kg)	Fr		Heber City, Utah
C	44	Kyle Tresnak	6 ft 10 in (2.08 m)	255 lb (116 kg)	So		Scottsdale, Arizona
C	45	James Hajek	6 ft 10 in (2.08 m)	250 lb (113 kg)	RS Fr	Skutt Catholic HS	Omaha, Nebraska
F/C	50	Ryan Van Pelt	6 ft 10 in (2.08 m)	200 lb (91 kg)	Fr	Timpanogos Academy	Lindon, Utah

Head coach

- Randy Rahe (Buena Vista)

Assistant coach(es)

- Eric Duft (Sterling (KS))
- Phil Beckner (Southern Utah)
- Tim Gardner (Johnson & Wales)

Legend

- (C) Team captain
- (S) Suspended
- (I) Ineligible
- (W) Walk-on
- Injured
- Current redshirt

Roster
Last update: May 21, 2021

== Schedule ==
Date time, TV	Rank^{#}	Opponent^{#}	Result	Record	Site (attendance) city, state
Exhibition
11/7/2011*; 7:00 pm		UC Colorado Springs	W 101–55		Dee Events Center; Ogden, UT
Regular season
11/11/2011*; 8:00 pm		Northern New Mexico	W 109–50	1–0	Dee Events Center (4,882); Ogden, UT
11/15/2011*; 7:00 pm		Utah State	W 73–63	2–0	Dee Events Center (9,359); Ogden, UT
11/19/2011*; 5:30 pm		at UC Irvine	W 80–72	3–0	Bren Events Center (1,655); Irvine, CA
11/27/2011*; 7:30 pm		vs. Jacksonville State; Shamrock Office Solutions Classic	W 69–61	4–0	McKeon Pavilion (1,791); Moraga, CA
11/28/2011*; 8:30 pm		at Saint Mary's; Shamrock Office Solutions Classic	L 70–87	4–1	McKeon Pavilion (1,488); Moraga, CA
12/3/2011*; 7:30 pm		San Jose State	W 91–89 ^{2OT}	5–1	Dee Events Center (5,765); Ogden, UT
12/07/2011*; 7:00 pm, BYUtv		at BYU	L 66–94	5–2	Marriott Center (11,676); Provo, UT
12/10/2011*; 7:00 pm		Southern Utah	W 84–66	6–2	Dee Events Center (6,043); Ogden, UT
12/16/2011*; 8:30 pm		at California	L 57–77	6–3	Haas Pavilion (7,987); Berkeley, CA
12/19/2011*; 7:00 pm		Mayville State	W 106–57	7–3	Dee Events Center (5,304); Ogden, UT
12/22/2011*; 7:00 pm, Altitude		Utah	W 80–51	8–3	Dee Events Center (8,239); Ogden, UT
12/29/2011; 7:00 pm		Idaho State	W 78–64	9–3 (1–0)	Dee Events Center (6,071); Ogden, UT
12/31/2011; 4:00 pm		Sacramento State	W 74–63	10–3 (2–0)	Dee Events Center (5,903); Ogden, UT
01/05/2012; 7:00 pm, SWX		at Eastern Washington	W 76–69	11–3 (3–0)	Reese Court (2,376); Cheney, WA
01/07/2012; 8:00 pm		at Portland State	W 88–81	12–3 (4–0)	Stott Center (922); Portland, OR
01/12/2012; 7:00 pm		Montana State	W 63–49	13–3 (5–0)	Dee Events Center (6,134); Ogden, UT
01/14/2012; 7:00 pm		Montana	W 80–64	14–3 (6–0)	Dee Events Center (7,236); Ogden, UT
01/19/2012; 7:00 pm		Northern Arizona	W 81–67	15–3 (7–0)	Dee Events Center (6,059); Ogden, UT
01/26/2012; 8:00 pm		at Sacramento State	W 75–60	16–3 (8–0)	Colberg Court (823); Sacramento, CA
01/28/2012; 7:00 pm		at Idaho State	L 62–64	16–4 (8–1)	Holt Arena (3,309); Pocatello, ID
02/02/2012; 7:00 pm		Portland State	W 92–79	17–4 (9–1)	Dee Events Center (6,285); Ogden, UT
02/04/2012; 5:00 pm, Altitude		Northern Colorado	W 93–81	18–4 (10–1)	Dee Events Center (6,966); Ogden, UT
02/09/2012; 6:30 pm, FCS Pacific		at Northern Arizona	W 67–49	19–4 (11–1)	Walkup Skydome (843); Flagstaff, AZ
02/11/2012; 7:30 pm		Eastern Washington	W 84–75	20–4 (12–1)	Dee Events Center (8,361); Ogden, UT
02/15/2012; 7:00 pm		at Montana State	W 79–70	21–4 (13–1)	Worthington Arena (2,655); Bozeman, MT
02/18/2012*; 6:00 pm, ESPN3		Texas–Arlington; ESPN BracketBusters	W 72–70	22–4	Dee Events Center (8,952); Ogden, UT
02/23/2012; 7:00 pm, CET		at Northern Colorado	W 88–71	23–4 (14–1)	Butler–Hancock Sports Pavilion (1,769); Greeley, CO
02/28/2012; 7:00 pm, Altitude		at Montana	L 51–66	23–5 (14–2)	Dahlberg Arena (7,157); Missoula, MT
Big Sky tournament
03/06/2012; 5:30 pm, Altitude		vs. Portland State; Semifinals	W 69–63	24–5	Dahlberg Arena (5,563); Missoula, MT
03/07/2012; 7:00 pm, ESPN2		at Montana; Championship Game	L 66–85	24–6	Dahlberg Arena (7,042); Missoula, MT
[[2012 CollegeInsider.com Postseason tournament]]
03/13/2012*; 7:00 pm		Utah Valley; First Round	W 72–69	25–6	Dee Events Center (2,334); Ogden, UT
03/18/2012*; 4:00 pm		at Loyola Marymount; Second Round	L 78–84 ^{OT}	25–7	Gersten Pavilion (1,292); Los Angeles, CA
*Non-conference game. ^{#}Rankings from AP Poll. (#) Tournament seedings in parentheses. All times are in Mountain Time.

== NBA draft ==
Round	Pick	Player	NBA club
1	6	Damian Lillard	Portland Trail Blazers
