= 2012 Big Sky Conference men's basketball tournament =

- Classification: Division I
- Season: 2011–12
- Teams: 6
- First round site: campus sites
- Semifinals site: Dahlberg Arena; Missoula, Montana
- Finals site: Dahlberg Arena; Missoula, Montana
- Champions: Montana (8th title)
- Winning coach: Wayne Tinkle (1st title)
- MVP: Kareem Jamar (Montana)
- Television: Altitude, ESPN2 (final)

2011–12 Big Sky men's basketball standings
| | Conf. | | | | Overall |
| Team | W | | L | PCT | W | | L | PCT |
|---|---|---|---|---|---|---|---|---|
| Montana † | 15 | – | 1 | .938 | 25 | – | 7 | .781 |
| Weber State | 14 | – | 2 | .875 | 25 | – | 7 | .781 |
| Portland State | 10 | – | 6 | .625 | 17 | – | 14 | .548 |
| Eastern Washington | 8 | – | 8 | .500 | 15 | – | 17 | .469 |
| Idaho State | 7 | – | 9 | .438 | 9 | – | 21 | .300 |
| Montana State | 7 | – | 9 | .438 | 12 | – | 17 | .414 |
| Northern Colorado | 5 | – | 11 | .313 | 9 | – | 19 | .321 |
| Sacramento State | 5 | – | 11 | .313 | 10 | – | 18 | .357 |
| Northern Arizona | 1 | – | 15 | .063 | 5 | – | 24 | .172 |
† Conference tournament winner

The 2012 Big Sky Conference men's basketball tournament began on March 3 and continued through March 7. The regular-season champion Montana Grizzlies won the tournament and with it an automatic bid to the NCAA tournament.

Unlike many NCAA Division I conferences, the Big Sky does not invite all of its teams to its postseason tournament—only the top six teams in regular-season play qualify. The top two teams receive a bye into the semifinals, and the field is reseeded after the first round so that the 1 seed plays the lowest remaining seed.

The tournament's first round, involving the 3 through 6 seeds, was played on campus sites, specifically the home arenas of the 3 and 4 seeds—respectively the Peter Stott Center in Portland, Oregon, home to the Portland State Vikings, and Reese Court in Cheney, Washington, home to the Eastern Washington Eagles. The semifinals and championship were at Montana's home of Dahlberg Arena in Missoula.

== Bracket ==
Quarterfinals; March 3, 2012
4 | Eastern Washington | 81
5 | Idaho State | 75
(Pairings are reseeded after the first round)
3 | Portland State | 75
6 | Montana State | 53

Re-seeded Semifinals; March 6, 2012; Altitude
1 | Montana | 74
4 | Eastern Washington | 66
2 | Weber State | 69
3 | Portland State | 63

Championship Game; March 7, 2012; ESPN2
1 | Montana | 85
2 | Weber State | 66

First round games at campus sites of lower-numbered seeds
Semifinals and Championship game hosted by Montana
