= Ron Cottrell =

American basketball coach (born 1960)

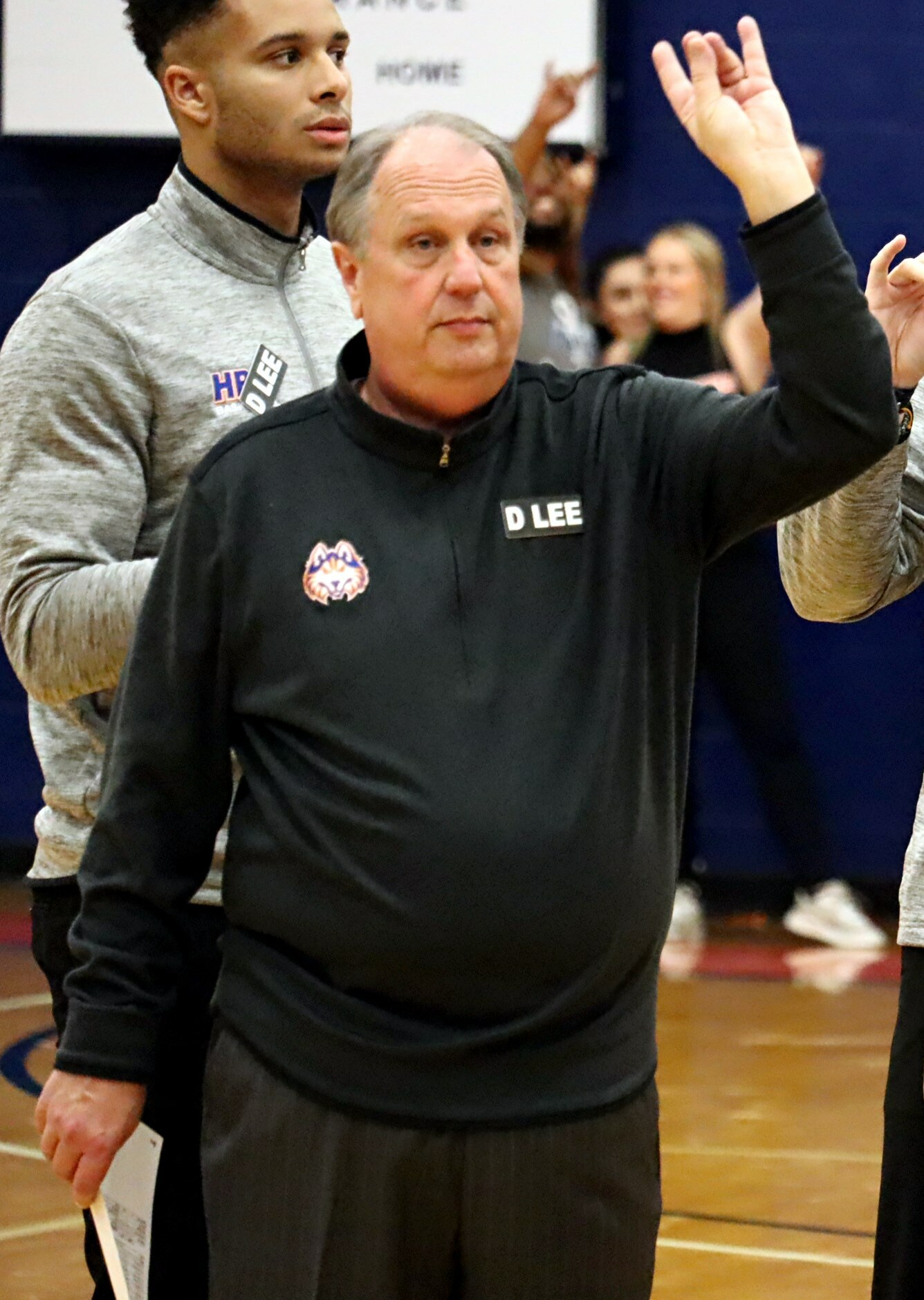
- Cottrell with Houston Christian in 2023

Current position
- Record: 524–512 (.506)

Biographical details
- Born: October 11, 1960 (age 66)
- Education: Arkansas ('88)

Coaching career (HC unless noted)
- 1986–87: North Dakota State College of Science (assistant)
- 1987–1990: Arkansas (assistant)
- 1990–2024: Houston Christian

Head coaching record
- Overall: 524–512 (.506)

Ron Cottrell (born October 11, 1960) is an American basketball coach. He is most known for being the head men's basketball coach at Houston Christian University in Houston, Texas from 1990 to 2024. After beginning his career as a student assistant on Nolan Richardson's staff at Arkansas, Cottrell took over as Athletic Director and head men's basketball coach at Houston Christian, then known as Houston Baptist. From 1998 to 2007, the Huskies made the NAIA men's basketball tournament each season. On December 7, 2021, Cottrell earned his 500th win as a head coach. On March 7, 2024, it was announced that HCU and Cottrell would be parting ways after 34 years.

== Career head coaching record ==
Record table
Season	Team	Overall	Conference	Standing	Postseason
Houston Baptist () (1991–1998)
1991–92	Houston Baptist	7–23			
1992–93	Houston Baptist	14–19			
1993–94	Houston Baptist	17–16			
1994–95	Houston Baptist	21–13			
1995–96	Houston Baptist	16–14			
1996–97	Houston Baptist	17–15			
1997–98	Houston Baptist	26–6			NAIA Division I first round
Houston Baptist (Red River Athletic Conference) (1998–2007)
1998–99	Houston Baptist	25–10		1st	NAIA Division I first round
1999–00	Houston Baptist	28–6		1st	NAIA Division I second round
2000–01	Houston Baptist	31–5		1st	NAIA Division I first round
2001–02	Houston Baptist	26–9		1st	NAIA Division I first round
2002–03	Houston Baptist	31–3		1st	NAIA Division I first round
2003–04	Houston Baptist	27–6		1st	NAIA Division I first round
2004–05	Houston Baptist	23–10		1st	NAIA Division I first round
2005–06	Houston Baptist	27–6		1st	NAIA Division I second round
2006–07	Houston Baptist	22–7		1st	NAIA Division I second round
Houston Baptist (Independent) (2007–2009)
2007–08	Houston Baptist	13–15			
2008–09	Houston Baptist	5–25			
Houston Baptist (Great West Conference) (2009–2013)
2009–10	Houston Baptist	12–21	9-3	2nd	
2010–11	Houston Baptist	5–26	2–10	T-6th	
2011–12	Houston Baptist	10–20	3–7	5th	
2012–13	Houston Baptist	14–17	3–5	T-3rd	
Houston Baptist/Houston Christian (Southland Conference) (2013–2024)
2013–14	Houston Baptist	6–25	2–16	14th	
2014–15	Houston Baptist	12–16	7–11	T–8th	
2015–16	Houston Baptist	17–17	10–8	5th	CBI first round
2016–17	Houston Baptist	17–14	12–6	T–2nd	CIT first round
2017–18	Houston Baptist	6–25	2–16	T–11th	
2018–19	Houston Baptist	12–18	8–10	T–7th	
2019–20	Houston Baptist	4–25	4–16	13th	
2020–21	Houston Baptist	6–19	4–11	11th	
2021–22	Houston Baptist	11–18	6–8	5th	
2022–23	Houston Christian	10–22	7–11	T–6th	
2023–24	Houston Christian	6–23	4–14	T–8th	
Total:		524–512 (.506)			
National champion Postseason invitational champion Conference regular season champion Conference regular season and conference tournament champion Division regular season champion Division regular season and conference tournament champion Conference tournament champion
