= Wayne Tinkle =

American basketball player and coach (born 1966)

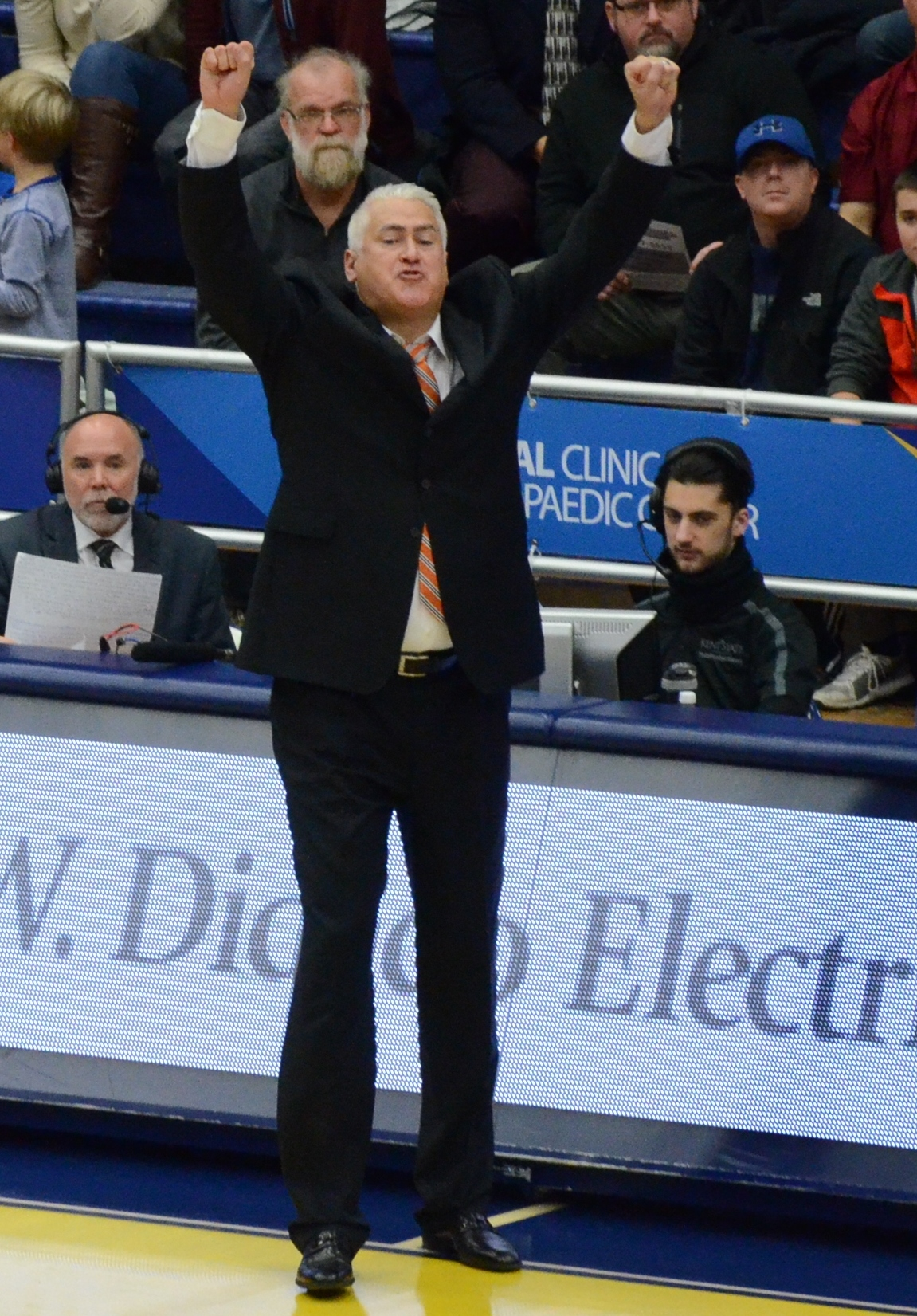
- Tinkle with the Oregon State Beavers in 2017

Personal information
- Born: January 26, 1966 (age 60) Milwaukee, Wisconsin, U.S.
- Listed height: 6 ft 10 in (2.08 m)
- Listed weight: 233 lb (106 kg)

Career information
- High school: Joel E. Ferris (Spokane, Washington)
- College: Montana (1985–1989)
- NBA draft: 1989: undrafted
- Playing career: 1989–2001
- Position: Center
- Coaching career: 2001–present

Career history

Playing
- 1989: Topeka Sizzlers
- 1989–1990: Liège Basket
- 1990–1991: Solna Vikings
- 1991–1993: Tri-City Chinook
- 1993: Juver Murcia
- 1993: Rapid City Thrillers
- 1993–1994: Onyx Caserta
- 1994: Rapid City Thrillers
- 1994: Pagrati
- 1994–1996: Peñas Huesca / Grupo AGB Huesca
- 1996–1997: Covirán Granada
- 1997–1998: Fórum Filatélico Valladolid
- 1998–1999: Cáceres
- 2001: Las Vegas Silver Bandits

Coaching
- 2001–2006: Montana (assistant)
- 2006–2014: Montana
- 2014–2026: Oregon State

Career highlights
- As head coach: 2× Big Sky regular season champion (2012, 2013); 3× Big Sky tournament champion (2010, 2012, 2013); Pac-12 tournament champion (2021); 2× Big Sky Coach of the Year (2012, 2013); As player: CBA All-Star (1993)

Wayne Francis Tinkle II (born January 26, 1966) is an American former basketball player and college basketball coach. He was most recently the head coach at Oregon State University from 2014 to 2026. Tinkle was also the head coach at his alma mater, the University of Montana, from 2006 to 2014. He played professionally for twelve seasons until 2000, including stints in the Continental Basketball Association (CBA) and International Basketball League (IBL), as well as in Sweden, Spain, Italy, and Greece.

== Early life and college ==
Born in Milwaukee, Wisconsin, Tinkle's family moved to Spokane, Washington, and he graduated from Ferris High School in 1984. In his senior season, he led the Greater Spokane League in scoring and field goal percentage (61.8).

Tinkle played college basketball at the University of Montana in Missoula from 1984 to 1989, under head coaches Mike Montgomery and Stew Morrill. As a senior, he was named to the conference's second team.

== Professional playing career ==
Tinkle played professionally for twelve years, spending most of his time in Europe in Sweden, Italy, Spain, and Greece. The Topeka Sizzlers selected him in the second round, 26th overall, in the 1989 CBA draft. Tinkle played in 12 games for the Sizzlers and averaged 19.0 points and 10.4 rebounds. Later in his first season, he signed with Liège Basket of Basketball League Belgium and averaged 24.1 points and 11.5 rebounds. In the 1990–91 season, Tinkle played for the Solna Vikings of the Swedish Basketligan, averaging 21.3 points and 11.0 rebounds.

From 1991 to 1993, Tinkle played for the Tri-City Chinook of the CBA. He played in the CBA All-Star Game in 1993. On February 19, 1993, Tinkle signed with Juver Murcia of the Spanish Liga ACB. In 5 regular season games, Tinkle averaged 15.4 points and 7.6 rebounds.

Tinkle began the 1993–94 season with the CBA's Rapid City Thrillers, until he signed with Onyx Caserta of the Italian Lega Basket on December 28, 1993. In nine games with Caserta, he averaged 18.7 points and 6.8 rebounds. On March 4, 1994, Tinkle re-signed with Rapid City.

In the 1994–95 season, Tinkle began with Pagrati Athens of the Greek Basket League, before signing with Somontano Huesca of Liga ACB on November 25. In 21 regular season games, he averaged 12.5 points and 6.9 rebounds, and remained with the team the following season, when it became Grupo AGB Huesca. Tinkle improved to 16.8 points and 7.2 rebounds in the 1995–96 season.

For Covirán Granada in the 1996–97 season, Tinkle averaged 16.2 points and 9.8 rebounds in 34 regular season games. The following season with Fórum Filatélico Valladolid, he averaged 14.1 points and 7.0 rebounds in 34 regular season games. With Cáceres CB in the 1998–99 season, Tinkle averaged 10.3 points and 6.6 rebounds.

After sitting out the 1999–2000 season due to injuries, Tinkle signed with the Las Vegas Silver Bandits of the International Basketball League in January 2001, in what would be his final time playing professionally and the final season of the team. In 17 games with Las Vegas, Tinkle averaged 11.4 points and 5.1 rebounds.

== Personal life ==
Wayne is married to Lisa McLeod, a former player for the Lady Griz. They have two daughters; Joslyn, who plays for the Sydney Uni Flames professional women's basketball team, and Elle, a former player at Gonzaga; and a son Tres, who played for him at Oregon State. In 2014, Tinkle was named the Sexiest Man in College Basketball by CollegeInsider.com.

== Coaching career ==
=== Montana ===
Tinkle was hired as an assistant coach at his alma mater in September 2001, and served under three head coaches. When Larry Krystkowiak left Missoula for an assistant's job in the NBA with the Milwaukee Bucks, Tinkle was promoted to head coach in June 2006. He became one of the winningest coaches in school history, boasting an overall record of 158–89 (.640).

Tinkle was the first at Montana to advance to the NCAA tournament three times, and his 158 victories are the fourth-highest. He was 97–39 (.713) in Big Sky Conference games, the most league wins by any coach at UM. In his penultimate season in Missoula, Tinkle led the Grizzlies to their second straight trip to the NCAA tournament, as UM played 19th-ranked Syracuse in San Jose, California. It was Montana's third trip to the Big Dance in four seasons, and the tenth in school history.

With its NCAA berth in 2012, Montana advanced to post-season play a school-record four straight seasons. Montana went 19–1 in conference play that season en route to winning the conference's regular-season title, and those 19 victories are a Big Sky record. Tinkle was tabbed the Big Sky's "Coach of the Year" in the 2011–12 and 2012–13 seasons. He is the first coach in Montana history to be named the Big Sky's coach of the year twice, and was a finalist for the Hugh Durham Award, presented annually to the mid-major coach of the year.

In 2011–12, the 13th-seeded Grizzlies played the fourth-seeded and 14th-ranked (Associated Press) Wisconsin Badgers in an NCAA tournament game in Albuquerque, New Mexico. The Grizzlies lost to finish at 25–7, and tied a school record with their fourth consecutive twenty-win season (25–7, 25–7, 21–11, and 22–10). Montana was ranked 14th in the final Mid-Major Top 25 Poll following the 2012–13 season. Their 25 wins in 2012–13 tied the previous season's team for the second-most ever in school history. (The 1991–92 and 1949–50 squads are tied for the most victories.)

When the Grizzlies defeated Weber State in the Big Sky tournament final on March 16, 2013, it was their 93rd win over the last four seasons – a school record. Tinkle was recognized for the Grizzlies' success in 2012, as he was named the NABC Division I All-District 6 "Coach of the Year" by NABC. In 2010–11, he guided Montana to a 21–11 record and a berth in the College Basketball Invitational (CBI) tournament. In 2009–10, the Griz went 22–10, won the league's tourney and advanced to the NCAAs, but lost by five points to New Mexico.

Tinkle went to the NCAA tournament six times at Montana: three as the head coach and three as an assistant (2002 against Oregon (head coach Don Holst), 2005 vs. Washington, and 2006 against Nevada and Boston College with mentor Larry Krystkowiak).

=== Oregon State ===
On May 19, 2014, Tinkle left for Oregon State of the Pac–12 Conference.

In the 2016–17 season, Tinkle tied the record for most losses (27) in a single season by a major conference coach.

In the 2020–21 season, the Beavers were projected to finish last in the Pac-12. The Beavers finished tied for 6th in the regular season standings and eventually won the Pac-12 tournament, where they automatically received a bid to the 2021 NCAA tournament. The Beavers were selected as a 12 seed in the NCAA tournament and made a run to the Elite 8, with victories over Tennessee, Oklahoma State, and Loyola-Chicago, before losing to the Houston Cougars with their best finish in the tournament since 1965–66.

In the 2021–22 season, Tinkle broke his own record for most losses in a single season by a major conference coach. The record only lasted one year before being broken by Mark Fox.

On February 26, 2026, Oregon State announced that Tinkle would not be retained for the next season. He was given the option to finish the 2025–26 season and chose to do so.

== Head coaching record ==
Record table
Season	Team	Overall	Conference	Standing	Postseason
Montana Grizzlies (Big Sky Conference) (2006–2014)
2006–07	Montana	17–15	10–6	3rd	
2007–08	Montana	14–16	8–8	4th	
2008–09	Montana	17–12	11–5	T–2nd	
2009–10	Montana	22–10	10–6	T–3rd	NCAA Division I Round of 64
2010–11	Montana	21–11	12–4	2nd	CBI first round
2011–12	Montana	25–7	15–1	1st	NCAA Division I Round of 64
2012–13	Montana	25–7	19–1	1st	NCAA Division I Round of 64
2013–14	Montana	17–13	12–8	T–2nd	
Montana:		158–91 (.640)	97–39 (.713)		
Oregon State Beavers (Pac-12 Conference) (2014–2024)
2014–15	Oregon State	17–14	8–10	7th	
2015–16	Oregon State	19–13	9–9	6th	NCAA Division I Round of 64
2016–17	Oregon State	5–27	1–17	12th	
2017–18	Oregon State	16–16	7–11	10th	
2018–19	Oregon State	18–13	10–8	T–4th	
2019–20	Oregon State	18–13	7–11	T–8th	
2020–21	Oregon State	20–13	10–10	T–6th	NCAA Division I Elite Eight
2021–22	Oregon State	3–28	1–19	12th	
2022–23	Oregon State	11–21	5–15	11th	
2023–24	Oregon State	13–19	5–15	12th	
Oregon State Beavers (West Coast Conference) (2024–2026)
2024–25	Oregon State	20–13	10–8	5th	CBC First Round
2025–26	Oregon State	17–16	9–9	4th	
Oregon State:		176–206 (.461)	82–142 (.366)		
Total:		334–297 (.529)			
National champion Postseason invitational champion Conference regular season champion Conference regular season and conference tournament champion Division regular season champion Division regular season and conference tournament champion Conference tournament champion
