= 2010 Big Sky Conference men's basketball tournament =

- Classification: Division I
- Season: 2009–10
- Teams: 6
- First round site: campus sites (2); Bozeman, Montana; Missoula, Montana
- Semifinals site: Dee Events Center; Ogden, Utah
- Finals site: Dee Events Center; Ogden, Utah
- Champions: Montana Grizzlies (7th title)
- Winning coach: Wayne Tinkle (1st title)
- MVP: Anthony Johnson (Montana)

2009–10 Big Sky men's basketball standings
	Conf.				Overall
Team	W		L	PCT	W		L	PCT
Weber State	13	–	3	.813	20	–	11	.645
Northern Colorado	12	–	4	.750	25	–	7	.781
Montana State	10	–	6	.625	15	–	14	.517
Montana †	10	–	6	.625	22	–	9	.710
Northern Arizona	8	–	8	.500	14	–	14	.500
Portland State	7	–	9	.438	12	–	19	.387
Eastern Washington	5	–	11	.313	9	–	21	.300
Idaho State	4	–	12	.250	7	–	22	.241
Sacramento State	3	–	13	.188	9	–	21	.300
† Conference tournament winner

The 2010 Big Sky men's basketball tournament was played March 6–10, with the opening round quarterfinals held at the higher seed's home arena, both in Montana at Bozeman and Missoula. The semifinals and final were held at the Dee Events Center in Ogden, Utah, the home of regular season champion Weber State.

The top six teams from regular season play qualified and the top two received a bye to the semifinals. Fourth-seed Montana upset host Weber State by a point in the final to earn the automatic bid to the NCAA tournament. As regular season champions who failed to win the tournament, Weber State received an automatic bid to the National Invitation Tournament (NIT).

== Bracket ==
Quarterfinals; Saturday, March 6
3	Montana State	65
6	Portland State	68
4	Montana	81
5	Northern Arizona	60

Re-seeded Semifinals; Tuesday, March 9
1	Weber State	69
6	Portland State	60
4	Montana	68
2	Northern Colorado	63

Championship; Wednesday, March 10
1	Weber State	65
4	Montana	66
