= NJIT Highlanders men's basketball =

NJIT Highlanders
2026–27 NJIT Highlanders men's basketball team
- Institution: New Jersey Institute of Technology
- Head coach: Grant Billmeier (4th season)
- Location: Newark, New Jersey
- Arena: Joel and Diane Bloom Wellness and Events Center (capacity: 3,500)
- Conference: America East
- Nickname: Highlanders
- Colors: Red and white

NCAA Division I tournament Elite Eight
- 1995*
Other NCAA Division I tournament results
Sweet Sixteen	1995*
Appearances	1991*, 1993*, 1994*, 1995*, 1996*

Conference regular-season champions
- Great West Conference; 2013
- * - at Division III level

The NJIT Highlanders men's basketball team is the basketball team that represents New Jersey Institute of Technology in Newark, New Jersey, United States. The school's teams are members of the America East Conference.

== Postseason ==
=== CIT results ===
The Highlanders have appeared in the CollegeInsider.com Postseason Tournament (CIT) three times. Their combined record is 7–3. The 2015 CIT was their first NCAA Division I postseason tournament.

Year	Round	Opponent	Result
2015	First round Second Round; Quarterfinals; Semifinals	New Hampshire; Cleveland State; Canisius; Northern Arizona	W 84–77; W 80–77; W 78–73; L 61–68
2016	First round Second Round; Quarterfinals; Semifinals	Army; Boston University; Texas–Arlington; Columbia	W 79–65; W 83–72; W 63–60; L 65–80
2019	First round Quarterfinals	Quinnipiac; Hampton	W 92–81; L 70–82

=== NCAA Division III tournament results ===
The Highlanders appeared in the NCAA Division III tournament five times. Their combined record was 3–5.

Year	Round	Opponent	Result
1991	Regional First round	Glassboro State	L 80–88
1993	Regional Quarterfinals	Hunter	L 70–83
1994	Regional Quarterfinals	Richard Stockton	L 69–74
1995	Regional First round Regional Quarterfinals; Regional semifinals Regional Finals	York; Jersey City State; Hamilton; Rowan	W 87–70; W 97–86; W 96–86; L 87–101
1996	Regional First round	NYU	L 88–105
