= 2019–20 Ukrainian Basketball SuperLeague =

Ukrainian Basketball SuperLeague
- Season: 2019–20
- Teams: 9

Finals
- Champions: Dnipro (2nd title)
- Runners-up: Kyiv-Basket
- Third place: Prometey

The 2019–20 Ukrainian Basketball SuperLeague was the 2019–20 edition of the Ukrainian top-tier basketball championship. Khimik were the defending champions.

This season will mark the debut season of Prometey Kamianske and Kharkivski Sokoly.

On 13 March 2020, the season was ended prematurely due to the coronavirus pandemic, with Dnipro named champions and Kyiv-Basket as runner-up.

== Teams ==
Location of teams in 2019–20 Basketball SuperLeague

On 13 August 2019, the Basketball Federation of Ukraine (FBU) announced that nine teams will participate in this SuperLeague season, including two newcomers. Prometey Kamianske was promoted as champions of the Ukrainian Higher League. Kharkivski Sokoly entered the league as replacement for BC Politekhnik, which could not give the financial guarantees needed and left the league after three seasons.

Team	City	Arena	Capacity
Cherkaski Mavpy	Cherkasy	Sportpalace Budivelnyk	1,500
Dnipro	Dnipro	Sportcomplex Shynnik	5,600
Kharkivski Sokoly	Kharkiv	Lokomotyv Sports Palace	4,000
Khimik	Yuzhne	Sportcomplex Olymp	2,000
Kyiv-Basket	Kyiv	Kyiv Sports Palace	7,000
Mykolaiv	Mykolaiv	Sports School Nadiya	2,000
Odesa	Odesa	Palace of Sports	3,500
Prometey	Kamianske		
Zaporizhzhia	Zaporizhzhia	Palace of Sports ZAB	

== Squads ==
=== BC Dnipro ===
BC Dnipro roster
Players
Coaches

Pos.	No.	Nat.	Name	Ht.	Wt.	Age
SG		(United States)	Terrell, Jared	1.91 m (6 ft 3 in)	103 kg (227 lb)	31 – 10 February 1995
C	2	(Ukraine)	Chumakov, Igor	2.08 m (6 ft 10 in)	86 kg (190 lb)	36 – 13 February 1990
PG	5	(United States)	Dugat, Henry	1.83 m (6 ft 0 in)	82 kg (181 lb)	39 – 1 January 1987
SG	7	(Ukraine)	Shundel, Anatolii	1.90 m (6 ft 3 in)	75 kg (165 lb)	32 – 5 December 1993
SF	11	(Ukraine)	Dubonenko, Igor	1.93 m (6 ft 4 in)	78 kg (172 lb)	28 – 11 February 1998
C	12	(Ukraine)	Korniyenko, Maksym	2.07 m (6 ft 9 in)	100 kg (220 lb)	39 – 22 June 1987
C	15	(Ukraine)	Natyazhko, Kyrylo	2.10 m (6 ft 11 in)	123 kg (271 lb)	35 – 30 November 1990
PF	21	(Ukraine)	Tymofeyenko, Stanislav	2.06 m (6 ft 9 in)	103 kg (227 lb)	37 – 3 June 1989
F	25	(Ukraine)	Bondarchuk, Roman	1.96 m (6 ft 5 in)	91 kg (201 lb)	28 – 1 May 1998
PG	30	(Ukraine)	Sanon, Issuf	1.94 m (6 ft 4 in)	86 kg (190 lb)	26 – 30 October 1999
PG	33	(Ukraine)	Zakurdaev, Maksym	1.97 m (6 ft 6 in)	97 kg (214 lb)	33 – 16 June 1993
F	39	(Ukraine)	Sizov, Oleksandr	1.93 m (6 ft 4 in)	80 kg (176 lb)	38 – 16 June 1988
C	44	(Ukraine)	Fesenko, Kyrylo	2.16 m (7 ft 1 in)	135 kg (298 lb)	39 – 24 December 1986
PF	45	(Switzerland)	Kolomoisky, Gregory	1.93 m (6 ft 4 in)	95 kg (209 lb)	28 – 12 August 1998
PF	77	(Ukraine)	Glebov, Dmytro	1.98 m (6 ft 6 in)	105 kg (231 lb)	38 – 20 July 1988

Head coach

- (Ukraine) Denys Zhuravliov

Assistant coach(es)

- (Ukraine) Pavlo Agapov

Legend

- (C) Team captain
- Injured

- Roster
Updated: 7 January 2020

=== Kharkivski Sokoly ===
Kharkivski Sokoly roster
Players
Coaches

Pos.	No.	Nat.	Name	Ht.	Wt.	Age
PG	3	(Ukraine)	Boyarkin, Igor (C)	1.80 m (5 ft 11 in)	85 kg (187 lb)	31 – 13 June 1995
SG	12	(Ukraine)	Musiyenko, Anton	1.92 m (6 ft 4 in)	85 kg (187 lb)	28 – 31 October 1997
SG	13	(Ukraine)	Kozlov, Roman	1.92 m (6 ft 4 in)	82 kg (181 lb)	35 – 13 November 1990
C	15	(Ukraine)	Tykhonov, Dmytro	2.05 m (6 ft 9 in)	120 kg (265 lb)	34 – 19 January 1992
PG	17	(Ukraine)	Shapovalov, Andrii	1.89 m (6 ft 2 in)	88 kg (194 lb)	32 – 10 November 1993
SF	22	(United States)	Jackson, Zach	1.96 m (6 ft 5 in)	83 kg (183 lb)	29 – 13 August 1997
PF/C	23	(United States)	Graham, Delwan	2.01 m (6 ft 7 in)	100 kg (220 lb)	37 – 27 October 1988
PG	31	(United States)	Burnett, DeAndre	1.91 m (6 ft 3 in)	87 kg (192 lb)	32 – 21 January 1994
SG	32	(United States)	Jamar, Kareem	1.96 m (6 ft 5 in)	95 kg (209 lb)	33 – 16 October 1992
PF	37	(Ukraine)	Tarasenko, Oleksandr	2.03 m (6 ft 8 in)	90 kg (198 lb)	30 – 8 April 1996
PF/C	47	(Ukraine)	Tishchenko, Oleksandr	2.06 m (6 ft 9 in)	110 kg (243 lb)	37 – 25 March 1989

Head coach

- (Ukraine) Yevgen Murzin

Assistant coach(es)

- (Ukraine) Oleg Manoylenko

Athletic trainer(s)

- (Ukraine) Olena Belousova

Doctor

- (Ukraine) Volodymyr Klymenko

Manager

- (Ukraine) Kseniia Fedenko

Legend

- (C) Team captain
- Injured

- Roster
Updated: 7 January 2020

=== SC Prometey ===
SC Prometey roster
Players
Coaches

Pos.	No.	Nat.	Name	Ht.	Wt.	Age
G		(United States)	Creek, Maurice	1.96 m (6 ft 5 in)	88 kg (194 lb)	36 – 16 August 1990
F	5	(Ukraine)	Ungurian, Vladyslav	1.90 m (6 ft 3 in)	90 kg (198 lb)	31 – 3 April 1995
G	7	(Ukraine)	Lukashov, Denys	1.88 m (6 ft 2 in)	82 kg (181 lb)	37 – 30 April 1989
G	9	(Ukraine)	Otverchenko, Ruslan	1.95 m (6 ft 5 in)	82 kg (181 lb)	36 – 6 January 1990
F	10	(Ukraine)	Misyats, Oleksandr	2.02 m (6 ft 8 in)	100 kg (220 lb)	34 – 6 January 1992
F	13	(Ukraine)	Konate, Maks	2.00 m (6 ft 7 in)	91 kg (201 lb)	35 – 22 March 1991
F	15	(United States)	Miller, J.D.	2.03 m (6 ft 8 in)	107 kg (236 lb)	29 – 1 December 1996
F	24	(United States)	Myers, Mike	2.06 m (6 ft 9 in)	111 kg (245 lb)	34 – 2 June 1992
F	25	(Ukraine)	Malchevskiy, Vitalii	2.01 m (6 ft 7 in)	100 kg (220 lb)	39 – 5 September 1987
SG	33	(United States)	Culpepper, Randy	1.83 m (6 ft 0 in)	75 kg (165 lb)	37 – 16 May 1989
F	42	(Ukraine)	Antypov, Oleksandr	2.04 m (6 ft 8 in)	104 kg (229 lb)	31 – 22 August 1995
G	55	(Ukraine)	Sydorov, Illia	1.83 m (6 ft 0 in)	80 kg (176 lb)	29 – 4 December 1996

Head coach

- (Latvia) Kārlis Muižnieks

Legend

- (C) Team captain
- Injured

- Roster
Updated: 7 January 2020

=== BC Khimik ===
BC Khimik roster
Players
Coaches

Pos.	No.	Nat.	Name	Ht.	Wt.	Age
PG	00	(United States)	Williams, Isaiah	1.85 m (6 ft 1 in)	80 kg (176 lb)	31 – 23 June 1995
F	2	(United States)	Jones, Christian (injured)	2.01 m (6 ft 7 in)	102 kg (225 lb)	33 – 6 July 1993
PF	3	(United States)	Ugba, Averyl	1.97 m (6 ft 6 in)	106 kg (234 lb)	31 – 4 December 1994
F	5	(Ukraine)	Marchenko, Kyrylo (C)	1.92 m (6 ft 4 in)	80 kg (176 lb)	28 – 23 September 1997
SG	7	(Ukraine)	Rahimshaikov, Anuar	1.92 m (6 ft 4 in)	81 kg (179 lb)	29 – 25 March 1997
SG	11	(Ukraine)	Kozak, Vadym	1.82 m (6 ft 0 in)	77 kg (170 lb)	27 – 15 March 1999
SG	12	(Ukraine)	Klevzunyk, Denys	1.95 m (6 ft 5 in)	89 kg (196 lb)	25 – 12 November 2000
PF	17	(Ukraine)	Voinalovych, Andrii	2.03 m (6 ft 8 in)	93 kg (205 lb)	26 – 11 December 1999
PG	19	(Ukraine)	Ryabchuk, Oleksandr	1.86 m (6 ft 1 in)	91 kg (201 lb)	37 – 15 January 1989
C	20	(Ukraine)	Fresh-Stakhanov, Artur	2.07 m (6 ft 9 in)	87 kg (192 lb)	25 – 16 February 2001
PF	23	(United States)	Sullivan, Lewis	1.98 m (6 ft 6 in)	107 kg (236 lb)	31 – 29 May 1995
F	35	(Ukraine)	Kovalov, Artem	2.04 m (6 ft 8 in)	84 kg (185 lb)	28 – 28 November 1997
PG	45	(Ukraine)	Horobchenko, Mykhailo	1.84 m (6 ft 0 in)	77 kg (170 lb)	28 – 10 January 1998

Head coach

- (Ukraine) Vitalii Stepanovskyi

Assistant coach(es)

Legend

- (C) Team captain
- Injured

- Roster
Updated: 7 January 2020

=== Kyiv-Basket ===
Kyiv-Basket roster
Players
Coaches

Pos.	No.	Nat.	Name	Ht.	Wt.	Age
PG	2	(United States)	Shepherd, Kasey	1.91 m (6 ft 3 in)	76 kg (168 lb)	32 – 5 June 1994
C	3	(Ukraine)	Karl Radovic, Yevhen vitaliy	2.10 m (6 ft 11 in)	115 kg (254 lb)	22 – 12 May 2004
SF	4	(Ukraine)	Bliznyuk, Bogdan	1.98 m (6 ft 6 in)	98 kg (216 lb)	31 – 31 March 1995
C	5	(Ukraine)	Sandul, Maksim	2.08 m (6 ft 10 in)	113 kg (249 lb)	35 – 20 February 1991
	6	(Ukraine)	Sydoruk, Oleksandr	1.90 m (6 ft 3 in)	87 kg (192 lb)	24 – 5 November 2001
G	7	(Ukraine)	Zaiets, Illia			24 – 11 November 2001
G	8	(Ukraine)	Kondrakov, Yuriy	1.85 m (6 ft 1 in)	80 kg (176 lb)	30 – 30 January 1996
PG	10	(Canada)	Klassen, Marek	1.85 m (6 ft 1 in)	82 kg (181 lb)	34 – 11 June 1992
PF	11	(United States)	Hill, Kyndahl	2.01 m (6 ft 7 in)	91 kg (201 lb)	32 – 21 August 1994
SF	12	(Ukraine)	Krutous, Pavlo	1.96 m (6 ft 5 in)	85 kg (187 lb)	34 – 9 April 1992
SF	13	(Ukraine)	Pavlov, Serhii	2.06 m (6 ft 9 in)	102 kg (225 lb)	29 – 18 July 1997
SF	14	(Ukraine)	Pustozvonov, Maksym	2.01 m (6 ft 7 in)	98 kg (216 lb)	39 – 16 April 1987
G	15	(United States)	Edwin, Deon	1.91 m (6 ft 3 in)	95 kg (209 lb)	33 – 9 October 1992
PF	22	(Ukraine)	Petrov, Viacheslav	2.04 m (6 ft 8 in)	116 kg (256 lb)	32 – 13 August 1994

Head coach

- (Latvia) Ainars Bagatskis

Legend

- (C) Team captain
- Injured

- Roster
Updated: 7 January 2020

=== MBC Mykolaiv ===
MBC Mykolaiv roster
Players
Coaches

Pos.	No.	Nat.	Name	Ht.	Wt.	Age
С		(Ukraine)	Tsykaliuk, Oleksandr	2.03 m (6 ft 8 in)	100 kg (220 lb)	32 – 13 October 1993
G	3	(Ukraine)	Bobrov, Denys	1.91 m (6 ft 3 in)	80 kg (176 lb)	29 – 1 August 1997
G	7	(Ukraine)	Khokhonyk, Andrii	1.88 m (6 ft 2 in)	78 kg (172 lb)	29 – 7 August 1997
F	8	(Ukraine)	Onufriev, Oleksiy (C)	2.02 m (6 ft 8 in)	95 kg (209 lb)	44 – 24 February 1982
G	9	(Ukraine)	Lutsenko, Maksym	1.91 m (6 ft 3 in)	86 kg (190 lb)	33 – 30 January 1993
PG	11	(United States)	Peterson, QJ	1.83 m (6 ft 0 in)	83 kg (183 lb)	31 – 12 October 1994
G	15	(Ukraine)	Davydiuk, Anton	2.05 m (6 ft 9 in)	94 kg (207 lb)	34 – 6 May 1992
C	18	(Ukraine)	Yurchenko, Serhii	2.02 m (6 ft 8 in)	100 kg (220 lb)	39 – 17 March 1987
F	22	(Ukraine)	Pryimak, Serhii	2.04 m (6 ft 8 in)	91 kg (201 lb)	30 – 17 September 1996
C	33	(Russia)	Adediran, Aleksey	2.01 m (6 ft 7 in)	113 kg (249 lb)	43 – 30 October 1982
F	34	(Ukraine)	Meshcheriakov, Kyrylo	1.97 m (6 ft 6 in)	82 kg (181 lb)	31 – 17 August 1995
G	45	(Ukraine)	Zotov, Vitalii	1.88 m (6 ft 2 in)	84 kg (185 lb)	29 – 3 March 1997
C	55	(United States)	Bristol, Kervin	2.04 m (6 ft 8 in)	101 kg (223 lb)	38 – 4 September 1988

Head coach

- (Ukraine) Vitaliy Cherniy

Assistant coach(es)

Legend

- (C) Team captain
- Injured

- Roster
Updated: 7 January 2020

=== BC Zaporizhzhia ===
BC Zaporizhzhia roster
Players
Coaches

Pos.	No.	Nat.	Name	Ht.	Wt.	Age
F		(Ukraine)	Rahimov, Rustam	1.88 m (6 ft 2 in)	85 kg (187 lb)	27 – 7 June 1999
F		(Ukraine)	Sorochan, Dmytro	2.00 m (6 ft 7 in)	103 kg (227 lb)	28 – 6 August 1998
PF	1	(Ukraine)	Lypovtsev, Dmytro	2.03 m (6 ft 8 in)	105 kg (231 lb)	39 – 8 October 1986
G	2	(Ukraine)	Kozhemiakin, Andrii	1.90 m (6 ft 3 in)	85 kg (187 lb)	29 – 13 December 1996
SG	4	(Ukraine)	Titov, Yakiv	1.95 m (6 ft 5 in)	85 kg (187 lb)	27 – 29 August 1999
SF	7	(Ukraine)	Niemtsu, Illia	1.98 m (6 ft 6 in)	90 kg (198 lb)	28 – 30 July 1998
PF	9	(Ukraine)	Sokolenko, Danylo	2.03 m (6 ft 8 in)	85 kg (187 lb)	27 – 13 September 1999
F	11	(Ukraine)	Shevchenko, Volodymyr	2.00 m (6 ft 7 in)	87 kg (192 lb)	31 – 3 December 1994
G	13	(United States)	Stallworth, Lew	1.85 m (6 ft 1 in)	91 kg (201 lb)	30 – 29 May 1996
PF	14	(Ukraine)	Mikhieiev, Ivan	1.90 m (6 ft 3 in)	82 kg (181 lb)	27 – 14 January 1999
C	19	(Ukraine)	Buts, Anton	2.01 m (6 ft 7 in)	115 kg (254 lb)	38 – 13 May 1988
C	21	(Ukraine)	Sandul, Maksym	2.06 m (6 ft 9 in)	105 kg (231 lb)	35 – 20 February 1991
SF	23	(United States)	Randolph, Brandon	1.88 m (6 ft 2 in)	87 kg (192 lb)	31 – 26 May 1995
PF	24	(Ukraine)	Morozov, Roman	2.04 m (6 ft 8 in)	87 kg (192 lb)	27 – 24 October 1998
PF	44	(Ukraine)	Myronenko, Andriy (C)	2.00 m (6 ft 7 in)	100 kg (220 lb)	31 – 8 December 1994

Head coach

- (Ukraine) Valerii Plekhanov

Legend

- (C) Team captain
- Injured

- Roster
Updated: 7 January 2020

== Regular season ==
=== Standings ===
Pos	Team	Pld	W	L	PF	PA	PD	Pts	Qualification
1	Dnipro (C)	25	20	5	2206	1980	+226	45	Qualification for Champions League qualifying round
2	Kyiv-Basket	23	17	6	2044	1828	+216	40	Qualification for FIBA Europe Cup
3	Prometey	24	16	8	2145	1994	+151	40	Qualification for FIBA Europe Cup
4	Khimik	25	14	11	2019	1986	+33	39	
5	Odesa	25	13	12	1987	2048	−61	38	
6	Cherkaski Mavpy	24	12	12	1992	1989	+3	36	
7	Mykolaiv	26	8	18	2084	2186	−102	34	
8	Zaporizhzhia	26	8	18	2174	2404	−230	34	
9	Kharkivski Sokoly	26	4	22	2042	2278	−236	30	

Source: Flashscore
(C) Champions

=== Results ===
Home \ Away	CHE	DNI	KHI	KYI	MYK	ODE	KHS	PRO	ZAP	CHE	DNI	KHI	KYI	MYK	ODE	KHS	PRO	ZAP
Cherkaski Mavpy	—	67–78	74–81	85–77	97–87	92–76	104–102	90–85	95–97	—	86–101		87–95			91–77		89–92
Dnipro	82–70	—	65–57	75–78	94–87	84–70	95–57	60–67	96–85	103–95	—	95–80			95–70	91–80	94–97	92–64
Khimik	91–71	101–91	—	92–87	77–65	100–94	90–66	84–93	92–84	69–74		—	93–88	73–70	88–77			
Kyiv-Basket	95–87	81–86	91–56	—	96–91	111–114	79–71	82–63	110–73		97–82		—			96–79	82–63	
Mykolaiv	68–76	73–80	72–74	90–81	—	73–69	74–73	73–92	96–81	63–74	76–87		84–85	—		81–64	84–83	95–88
Odesa	69–80	78–84	86–73	51–90	74–73	—	75–63	81–79	94–84	65–69		74–68	74–70	77–74	—			
Kharkivski Sokoly	77–72	90–93	77–93	68–76	98–100	66–87	—	70–81	86–90	77–75		77–76	95–98		86–89	—	96–71	83–85
Prometey	92–99	93–99	83–72	74–88	115–86	91–88	114–77	—	98–89			87–76		90–77	96–72		—	105–95
Zaporizhzhia	85–80	81–94	81–88	60–93	84–73	77–87	102–87	77–103	—			64–85		104–99	82–96		85–93	—

Updated to match(es) played on 8 March 2020. Source:
Legend: Blue = home team win; Red = away team win.

== Ukrainian clubs in European competitions ==
Team	Competition	Progress
Kyiv-Basket	Champions League	Second qualifying round
Kyiv-Basket	FIBA Europe Cup	Quarterfinals
Dnipro	FIBA Europe Cup	Regular season
