= Western Carolina Catamounts men's basketball statistical leaders =

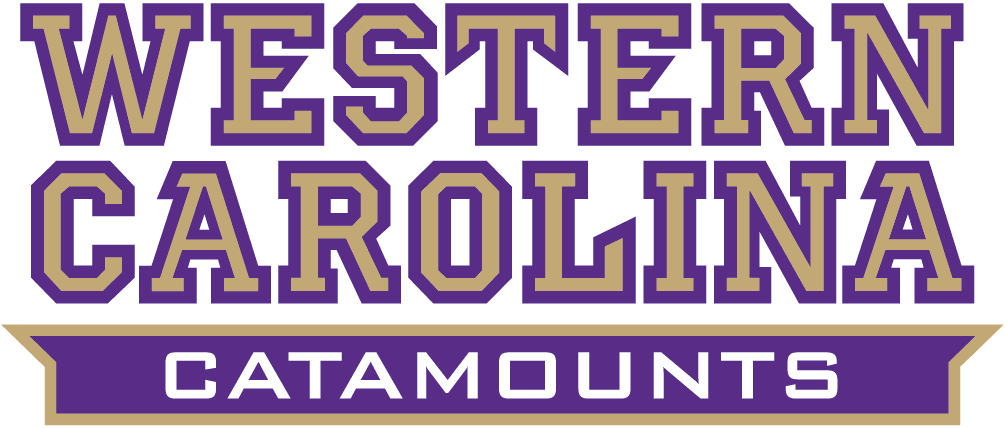

The Western Carolina Catamounts men's basketball statistical leaders are individual statistical leaders of the Western Carolina Catamounts men's basketball program in various categories, including points, assists, blocks, rebounds, and steals. Within those areas, the lists identify single-game, single-season, and career leaders. The Catamounts represent Western Carolina University in the NCAA's Southern Conference.

Western Carolina began competing in intercollegiate basketball in 1928. However, the school's record book does not generally list records from before the 1950s, as records from before this period are often incomplete and inconsistent. Since scoring was much lower in this era, and teams played much fewer games during a typical season, it is likely that few or no players from this era would appear on these lists anyway.

The NCAA did not officially record assists as a stat until the 1983–84 season, and blocks and steals until the 1985–86 season, but Western Carolina's record books includes players in these stats before these seasons. These lists are updated through the end of the 2020–21 season.

== Scoring ==
Career
Rk	Player	Points	Seasons
1	Henry Logan	3,290	1964–65 1965–66 1966–67 1967–68
2	Mel Gibson	2,020	1959–60 1960–61 1961–62 1962–63
3	Trey Sumler	1,996	2010–11 2011–12 2012–13 2013–14
4	Kevin Martin	1,838	2001–02 2002–03 2003–04
5	Ronald Rogers	1,818	1950–51 1951–52 1952–53
6	Greg Dennis	1,793	1978–79 1979–80 1980–81 1981–82
7	Anquell McCollum	1,777	1992–93 1993–94 1994–95 1995–96
8	Robert Gaines	1,680	1989–90 1990–91 1991–92 1992–93
9	Greg Wittman	1,628	1966–67 1967–68 1968–69
10	Gene McConnell	1,589	1966–67 1967–68 1968–69 1969–70

Season
Rk	Player	Points	Season
1	Henry Logan	1,049	1967–68
2	Henry Logan	816	1965–66
3	Henry Logan	757	1966–67
4	Frankie King	752	1993–94
5	Anquell McCollum	751	1995–96
6	Frankie King	743	1994–95
7	Mel Gibson	695	1962–63
8	Vonterius Woolbright	675	2023–24
9	Kevin Martin	673	2003–04
10	Henry Logan	668	1964–65

Single game
Rk	Player	Points	Season	Opponent
1	Henry Logan	60	1966–67	Atlantic Christian
2	Henry Logan	58	1967–68	Elon
3	Henry Logan	57	1965–66	Pfeiffer
4	Henry Logan	55	1967–68	Appalachian State
5	Henry Logan	53	1967–68	Quincy
6	Henry Logan	52	1967–68	High Point
7	Tre Jackson	47	2022–23	Wofford
8	Henry Logan	46	1965–66	Atlantic Christian
	Kevin Martin	46	2002–03	Coastal Carolina
10	Henry Logan	45	1965–66	Guilford
	Henry Logan	45	1966–67	Newberry

== Rebounds ==
Career
Rk	Player	Rebounds	Seasons
1	Greg Wittman	1,354	1966–67 1967–68 1968–69
2	Tommy Lavelle	1,281	1960–61 1961–62 1962–63 1963–64
3	Darrell Murray	1,208	1960–61 1961–62 1962–63 1963–64
4	Kenny Trimier	857	1979–80 1980–81 1981–82 1982–83
5	Gene McConnell	796	1966–67 1967–68 1968–69 1969–70
6	Vonterius Woolbright	784	2021–22 2022–23 2023–24
7	Gaston Seal	781	1959–60 1960–61 1961–62 1962–63
8	Bob Thompson	771	1965–66 1966–67 1967–68
9	Wilson Scott	756	1970–71 1971–72 1972–73
10	John Brintnall	700	1962–63 1963–64 1964–65 1965–66

Season
Rk	Player	Rebounds	Season
1	Greg Wittman	446	1967–68
2	Tommy Lavelle	433	1962–63
3	Bob Thompson	405	1967–68
4	Darrell Murray	401	1962–63
5	Dave Jones	395	1959–60
	Wilson Scott	395	1971–72
7	Vonterius Woolbright	384	2023–24
8	John Brintnall	369	1964–65
9	Kirby Thurston	348	1973–74
10	Greg Wittman	320	1966–67

Single game
Rk	Player	Rebounds	Season	Opponent
1	Bob Thompson	29	1967–68	Atlantic Christian
2	Greg Wittman	28	1967–68	High Point
3	Tommy Lavelle	24	1963–64	Piedmont
4	David Smith	23	1971–72	Carson-Newman
	Greg Wittman	23	1967–68	Catawba
6	Bob Thompson	22	1967–68	Catawba
7	Andre Gault	21	1987–88	Ferrum
	Terry Rutherford	21	1977–78	Marshall
	Greg Wittman	21	1967–68	Presbyterian
10	John Brintnall	20	1964–65	Pfeiffer
	Darrell Murray	20	1962–63	Earlham
	Bob Thompson	20	1966–67	Elon
	Bob Thompson	20	1967–68	Pfeiffer
	Bob Thompson	20	1967–68	Newberry
	Kirby Thurston	20	1973–74	Walsh
	Greg Wittman	20	1967–68	Atlantic Christian

== Assists ==
Career
Rk	Player	Assists	Seasons
1	Henry Logan	1,037	1964–65 1965–66 1966–67 1967–68
2	Casey Rogers	647	1998–99 1999–00 2000–01 2001–02
3	Larry Grant	557	1969–70 1970–71 1971–72 1972–73
4	Kevin Young	530	1978–79 1979–80 1980–81 1981–82
5	Lee Gibbs	520	1973–74 1974–75 1975–76
6	Vincent Walker	501	1983–84 1984–85 1985–86 1986–87
7	Trey Sumler	496	2010–11 2011–12 2012–13 2013–14
8	Larry Caldwell	475	1977–78 1978–79 1979–80 1980–81
9	Joel Fleming	463	1994–95 1995–96 1996–97 1997–98
10	Vonterius Woolbright	451	2021–22 2022–23 2023–24

Season
Rk	Player	Assists	Season
1	Henry Logan	298	1967–68
2	Henry Logan	272	1965–66
3	Henry Logan	262	1964–65
4	Lee Gibbs	231	1975–76
5	Casey Rogers	213	1999–00
6	Henry Logan	205	1966–67
7	Mason Faulkner	187	2019–20
8	Vonterius Woolbright	179	2023–24
9	Vincent Walker	177	1986–87
10	Larry Grant	176	1971–72

Single game
Rk	Player	Assists	Season	Opponent
1	Henry Logan	22	1967–68	Presbyterian
2	Henry Logan	19	1964–65	Catawba
3	Lee Gibbs	18	1975–76	Mars Hill
4	Henry Logan	17	1965–66	Atlantic Christian
5	Henry Logan	15	1967–68	High Point
	Henry Logan	15	1967–68	Newberry
	Henry Logan	15	1967–68	Catawba
	Vincent Walker	15	1986–87	Marshall
9	Henry Logan	14	1967–68	Pembroke State
	Henry Logan	14	1967–68	Montclair
	Kevin Young	14	1980–81	The Citadel

== Steals ==
Career
Rk	Player	Steals	Seasons
1	Brigham Waginger	285	2006–07 2007–08 2008–09 2009–10
2	Henry Logan	221	1964–65 1965–66 1966–67 1967–68
3	Harouna Mutombo	185	2008–09 2009–10 2010–11 2011–12
4	Trey Sumler	182	2010–11 2011–12 2012–13 2013–14
5	Bubba Wilson	179	1974–75 1975–76 1976–77 1977–78
6	Casey Rogers	170	1998–99 1999–00 2000–01 2001–02
7	Justin Browning	149	2012–13 2013–14 2014–15 2015–16
8	Anquell McCollum	147	1992–93 1993–94 1994–95 1995–96
9	Greg Dennis	142	1978–79 1979–80 1980–81 1981–82
10	Brandon Boggs	138	2010–11 2011–12 2012–13 2013–14

Season
Rk	Player	Steals	Season
1	Brigham Waginger	90	2009–10
2	Brigham Waginger	81	2008–09
3	Justin Browning	73	2015–16
4	Lee Gibbs	72	1975–76
5	Brigham Waginger	69	2007–08
6	Mike Williams	67	2010–11
7	Bubba Wilson	66	1976–77
8	Henry Logan	62	1967–68
9	Frankie King	61	1993–94
	Jay Lassiter	61	1975–76
	Trey Sumler	61	2012–13
	Bubba Wilson	61	1975–76

Single game
Rk	Player	Steals	Season	Opponent
1	Henry Logan	9	1967–68	High Point
2	Jay Lassiter	8	1975–76	UNC Wilmington
3	Terry Boyd	7	1990–91	Chattanooga
	Scott Bradley	7	1992–93	St. Andrews
	B.J. Thompson	7	1992–93	Marshall
	Brigham Waginger	7	2007–08	Elon
	Brigham Waginger	7	2006–07	Wofford
	Brigham Waginger	7	2009–10	Chattanooga
9	Nick Aldridge	6	2006–07	Appalachian State
	David Berghoefer	6	2004–05	Liberty
	Ricky Gandy	6	1999–00	Lees McRae
	Brandon Giles	6	2009–10	Gardner-Webb
	Kyle Greathouse	6	2006–07	UNC Greensboro
	Kyle Greathouse	6	2006–07	Atlanta Christian
	Kevin Martin	6	2003–04	Appalachian State
	Casey Rogers	6	2000–01	Belmont
	Antonio Russell	6	2004–05	Appalachian State
	Dennis Sluder	6	1974–75	St. Leo
	Brigham Waginger	6	2008–09	Col. of Charleston
	Brigham Waginger	6	2008–09	UNC Greensboro
	Brigham Waginger	6	2008–09	Col. of Charleston
	Brigham Waginger	6	2008–09	UNC Greensboro

== Blocks ==
Career
Rk	Player	Blocks	Seasons
1	Rans Brempong	308	2000–01 2001–02 2002–03 2003–04 2004–05
2	Kenneth Hall	124	2011–12 2012–13 2013–14 2014–15
3	Richie Gordon	120	2007–08 2008–09 2009–10 2010–11
4	Justin Browning	88	2012–13 2013–14 2014–15 2015–16
5	Bubba Wilson	84	1974–75 1975–76 1976–77 1977–78
6	Johnny Scott	80	1992–93 1993–94 1994–95 1996–97
7	Brandon Boggs	74	2010–11 2011–12 2012–13 2013–14
8	Torrion Brummitt	72	2012–13 2013–14 2014–15 2015–16
9	Ike Mims	71	1975–76 1976–77
10	Jeff VanDeMark	70	1991–92 1992–93 1993–94

Season
Rk	Player	Blocks	Season
1	Rans Brempong	93	2000–01
2	Rans Brempong	83	2004–05
3	Rans Brempong	66	2001–02
4	Rans Brempong	65	2002–03
5	Kirby Thurston	60	1974–75
6	Kenneth Hall	59	2013–14
7	Charles Lampten	49	2023–24
8	Richie Gordon	42	2010–11
9	Ike Mims	38	1975–76
10	Richie Gordon	37	2009–10
	Xavier Cork	37	2020–21

Single game
Rk	Player	Blocks	Season	Opponent
1	Charles Lampten	7	2023–24	The Citadel
	Rans Brempong	7	2004–05	UNC Greensboro
	Rans Brempong	7	2004–05	Chattanooga
	Jeff VanDeMark	7	1992–93	Appalachian State
	Tommy Lavelle	7	1963–64	Atlantic Christian
6	Rans Brempong	6	2004–05	Georgia Southern
	Kenneth Hall	6	2013–14	Samford
	Kenneth Hall	6	2013–14	Appalachian State
9	Rans Brempong	5	2002–03	VMI
	Rans Brempong	5	2002–03	Reinhardt
	Rans Brempong	5	2002–03	UNC Greensboro
	Rans Brempong	5	2004–05	Emmanuel
	Rans Brempong	5	2004–05	UNC Asheville
	Rans Brempong	5	2004–05	Atlanta Christian
	Richie Gordon	5	2009–10	Campbell
	Kenneth Hall	5	2011–12	UNC Asheville
	Kenneth Hall	5	2013–14	Limestone
	Xavier Cork	5	2020–21	Newberry
	Abdulai Fanta Kabba	5	2025–26	Virginia-Lynchburg
