= List of NCAA Division I basketball career triple-doubles leaders =

In basketball, a triple-double is defined as a performance in which one player accumulates a double-digit total in three of five positive statistical categories—points, rebounds, assists, steals, and blocked shots—in a game. The most common way for a player to achieve a triple-double is with points, rebounds, and assists, though on occasion players may record 10 or more steals or blocked shots in a game. Each player on this list has accomplished this feat at least five times in a National Collegiate Athletic Association (NCAA) Division I men's or women's game.

Individual scoring totals have been recognized as official NCAA statistics throughout what it calls the "modern era" of men's basketball, which it considers to have started with the 1937–38 season, the first without the center jump after each made basket. Individual rebounding was added in the 1950–51 season. Similarly, the NCAA has recognized the same statistics in women's basketball since it began sponsoring competition in that sport in the 1981–82 season. However, official recognition of the other possible components of the triple-double did not come until later. In men's basketball, the NCAA first kept individual assist totals in the 1950–51 season, but discontinued the practice after the 1951–52 season, not resuming until 1983–84. Blocked shots and steals became official men's statistics in 1985–86. In women's basketball, assists became an official Division I statistic in 1985–86, with blocks and steals following in 1987–88. Both the men's and women's lists include only triple-doubles that are officially recognized by the NCAA.

Through the 2023–24 season, the career record for triple-doubles in Division I men's basketball is held by BYU's Kyle Collinsworth with 12. On the women's Division I side, Sabrina Ionescu of Oregon holds the record with 26. The only active player with five or more triple-doubles through the end of 2023–24 is St. John's Deivon Smith (5).

The lone program to have had more than one player record five or more career triple-doubles is the Iowa women's program, with Caitlin Clark joined by Samantha Logic. The only other school to have had more than one player accomplish this feat is Saint Mary's, with Brian Shaw having split his college career between Saint Mary's and UC Santa Barbara, and Louella Tomlinson having played her entire college career at Saint Mary's.

== Key ==
Pos.	G	F	C
Position	Guard	Forward	Center

^	Player still competing in NCAA Division I
*	Elected to the Naismith Memorial Basketball Hall of Fame
Team (X)	Denotes the number of times a given school has had a player appear on a specific list

== Men ==
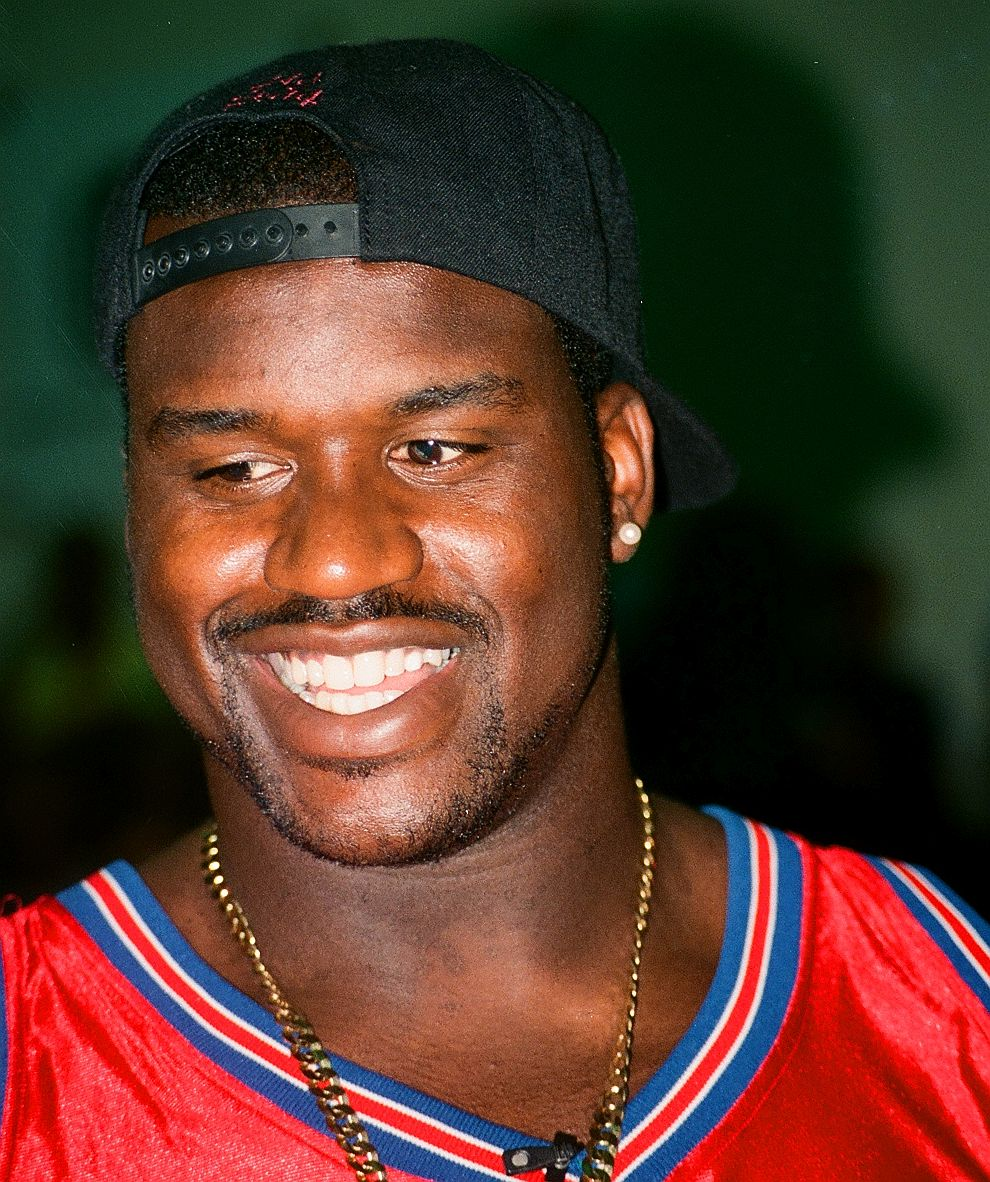
Shaquille O'Neal is the only member of the Naismith Hall of Fame to have recorded as many as 5 triple-doubles in his college career.

Current through the end of the 2024–25 season.

Player	Pos.	Team	Career start	Career end	Triple-doubles	Ref. (Note: Except as otherwise noted, references for each entry are from the most recent edition of the NCAA Division I men's or women's basketball record books, both cited in the "General references" section below.)
Kyle Collinsworth	G/F	BYU	2010	2016 (Note: After playing his freshman season in 2010–11, Collinsworth went on a two-year Mormon mission and did not play his sophomore season until 2013–14.)	12	
Michael Anderson	G	Drexel	1984	1988	6	
Shaquille O'Neal*	C	LSU	1989	1992	6	
Vonterius Woolbright	G	Western Carolina	2021	2024	6	
Shawn James	F/C	Northeastern / Duquesne	2004	2008	5	
Kevin Roberson	F/C	Vermont	1988	1992	5	
Brian Shaw	G	Saint Mary's / UC Santa Barbara	1983	1988	5	
Deivon Smith	G	Mississippi State / Georgia Tech / Utah / St. John's	2020	2025	5	

== Women ==
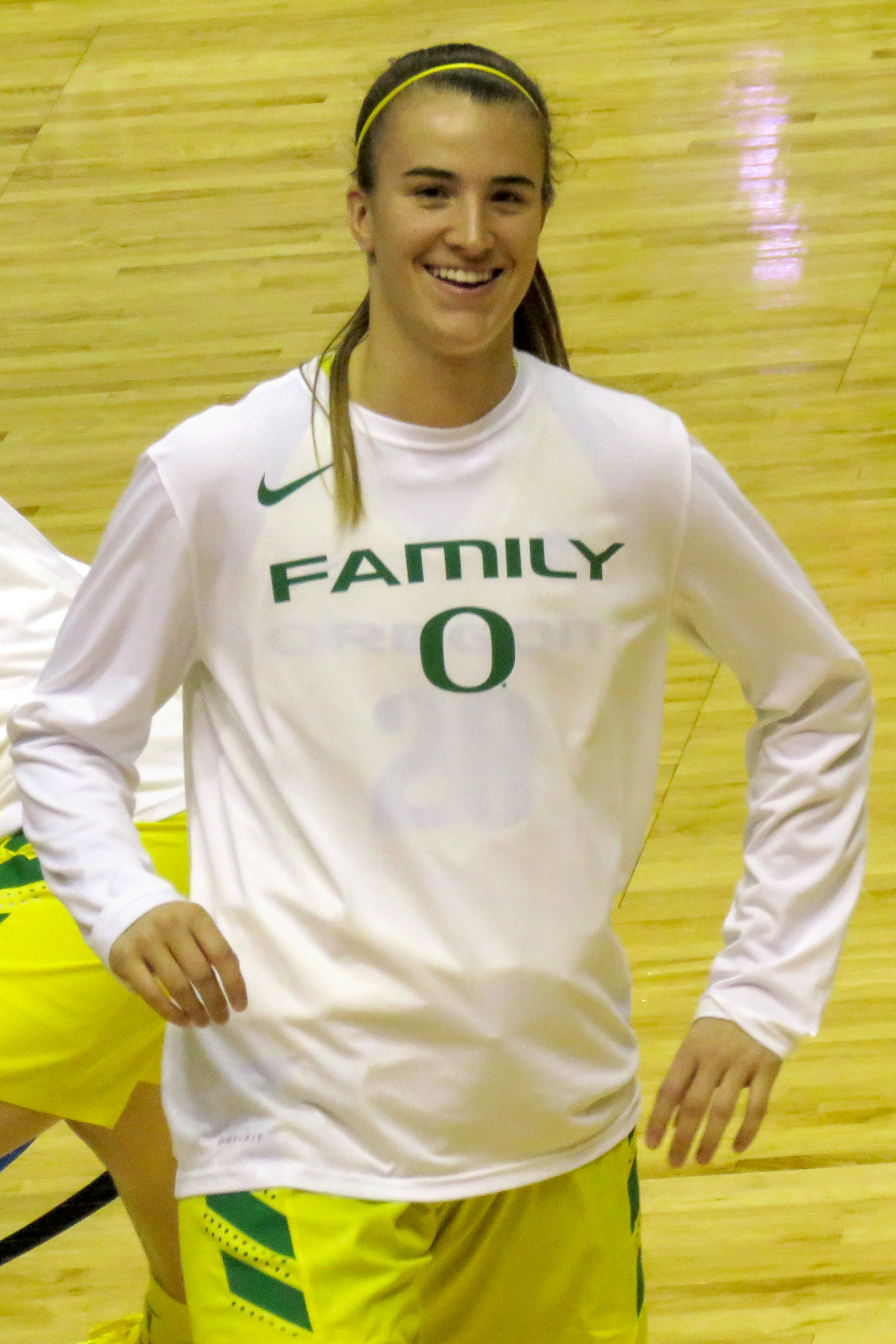
Sabrina Ionescu has recorded 26 triple-doubles, the most in Division I regardless of sex.

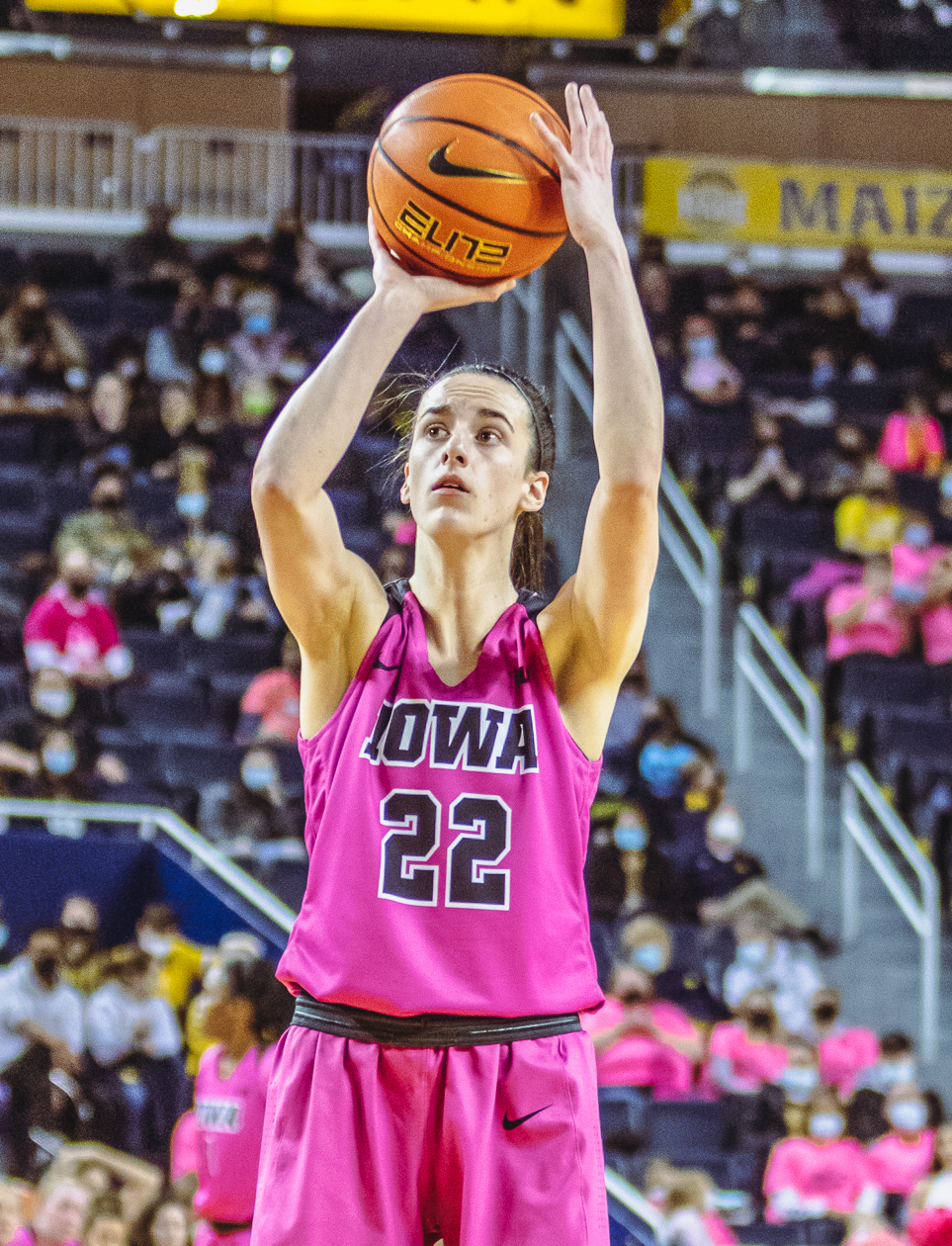
Caitlin Clark recorded with 10 or more career triple-doubles, being the third player men or women to achieve this.

Player	Pos.	Team	Career start	Career end	Triple-doubles	Ref.
Sabrina Ionescu	G	Oregon	2016	2020	26	
Caitlin Clark	G	Iowa	2020	2024	17	
Chastadie Barrs	G	Lamar	2015	2019	9	
Suzie McConnell	G	Penn State	1984	1988	7	
Louella Tomlinson	F	Saint Mary's	2007	2011	7	
Danielle Carson	G	Youngstown State	1981	1986	6	
Samantha Logic	G	Iowa (2)	2011	2015	6	
Nicole Powell	F	Stanford	2000	2004	6	
Alyssa Thomas	F	Maryland	2010	2014	6	
Joskeen Garner	F	Northwestern State	1992	1996	5	
Brittney Griner	C	Baylor	2009	2013	5	
Shalee Lehning	G	Kansas State	2005	2009	5	
