= Zach Jackson =

Zach Jackson may refer to:

- Zach Jackson (pitcher, born 1983), American former baseball player
- Zach Jackson (pitcher, born 1994), American baseball player
- Zach Jackson (basketball), American basketball player
