= Musiyenko =

Musiyenko, sometimes Musienko, Moussienko, etc. (Ukrainian: Мусієнко, Russian: Мусиенко) is a patronymic surname of Ukrainian language origin derived from the given name Musiy (Мусі́й), Ukrainian colloquial form of the given name Moses (the official form is Мойсей, 'Moysey'). Belarusian-language spelling: Musiyenka. Notable people with this surname include:

- Anton Musiyenko (born 1997), Ukrainian basketball player
- Ihor Musiyenko (born 1993), Ukrainian shot putter
- Mykola Musiyenko (born 1959), Ukrainian triple jumper
- Oleksandr Musiyenko (born 1987), Ukrainian footballer
- Oksana Musiyenko, Ukrainian film critic

== See also ==
- Musiy
