= Dajuan Graf =

American basketball player

No. 92 – Cherno More
- Position: Point guard

Personal information
- Born: December 16, 1992 (age 33) Charlotte, North Carolina, U.S.
- Listed height: 6 ft 1 in (1.85 m)
- Listed weight: 185 lb (84 kg)

Career information
- High school: Phillip O. Berry Academy of Technology (Charlotte, North Carolina)
- College: Florida Gulf Coast (2012–2014); North Carolina Central (2015–2017)
- NBA draft: 2017: undrafted
- Playing career: 2017–present

Career history
- 2017–2018: KK Alkar
- 2018–2020: VfL Kirchheim Knights
- 2020–2021: Kharkivski Sokoly
- 2021–2022: Ylli
- 2022–2023: Bashkimi
- 2023–2024: Golden Eagle Ylli
- 2024–present: Cherno More

Career highlights
- Kosovo Superleague champion (2022)

Dajuan Graf (born December 16, 1992) is an American professional basketball player for Cherno More. He attended and played college basketball for North Carolina Central University.

== Early life ==
Graf was born in Charlotte, North Carolina.

== Club career ==
In July 2020, Graf signed with Kharkivski Sokoly of the Ukrainian Basketball Superleague. He left the team in January 2022. On March 16, 2022, Graf signed with KB Ylli of the Kosovo Basketball Superleague.
