= Paulius Žalys =

Lithuanian basketball player

No. 11 – Rapla KK
- Position: Power forward
- League: Latvian–Estonian Basketball League

Personal information
- Born: 24 September 1995 (age 31) Kaunas, Lithuania
- Listed height: 2.00 m (6 ft 7 in)
- Listed weight: 95 kg (209 lb)

Career information
- College: Lafayette (2015–2019)
- NBA draft: 2019: undrafted
- Playing career: 2012–present

Career history
- 2012–2015: Žalgiris Kaunas
- 2019: Kharkivski Sokoly
- 2019–2020: Rapla KK

Paulius Žalys (born 24 September 1995) was a Lithuanian professional basketball player for Kharkivski Sokoly of the Ukrainian Basketball Superleague. Paulius retired from professional basketball after the 2019–2020 season in the Latvian-Estonian Basketball League.

== Professional career ==
Professional career started in Žalgiris Kaunas.

In September 2019, Žalys signed with Kharkivski Sokoly of the Ukrainian Basketball Superleague.

In January 2020, Žalys signed with Avis Utilitas Rapla of the Latvian–Estonian Basketball League.
