= Bubba Wilson =

American basketball player

Personal information
- Born: August 7, 1955 (age 71) Gastonia, North Carolina, U.S.
- Listed height: 6 ft 3 in (1.91 m)
- Listed weight: 175 lb (79 kg)

Career information
- High school: Hunter Huss (Gastonia, North Carolina)
- College: Western Carolina (1974–1978)
- NBA draft: 1978: 5th round, 101st overall pick
- Drafted by: Golden State Warriors
- Position: Shooting guard
- Number: 17

Career history
- 1979: Golden State Warriors
- 1980: Royal Tru-Orange
- Stats at NBA.com
- Stats at Basketball Reference

Thomas Eugene "Bubba" Wilson (born August 7, 1955) is an American former professional basketball player. He played for the Golden State Warriors in the National Basketball Association (NBA) for 16 games during 1979–80 after a collegiate career at Western Carolina University.

== Career statistics ==
Legend
GP	Games played	GS	Games started	MPG	Minutes per game
FG%	Field goal percentage	3P%	3-point field goal percentage	FT%	Free throw percentage
RPG	Rebounds per game	APG	Assists per game	SPG	Steals per game
BPG	Blocks per game	PPG	Points per game	**Bold**	Career high

=== NBA ===
==== Regular season ====
Year	Team	GP	MPG	FG%	3P%	FT%	RPG	APG	SPG	BPG	PPG
1979–80	Golden State	16	8.9	.280	–	.500	1.0	.8	.1	.0	1.1
