= Gene Teague =

American basketball player

Personal information
- Born: December 2, 1989 (age 36) Brooklyn, New York, U.S.
- Listed height: 6 ft 9 in (2.06 m)
- Listed weight: 265 lb (120 kg)

Career information
- High school: Living Faith Christian Academy
- College: Southern Illinois University (2009–2011), Seton Hall University (2012–2014)
- NBA draft: 2014: undrafted
- Playing career: 2014–present
- Position: Center

Career history
- 2014–2015: ALM Évreux Basket
- 2014–2015: Argentino de Junín
- 2015–2016: Leuven Bears
- 2015–2016: Trikala Aries
- 2016–2017: Türk Telekom
- 2017–2018: Sluneta Ústí nad Labem
- 2018–2019: Karesi Spor
- 2018–2019: Toros de Aragua
- 2019: Kharkivski Sokoly
- 2020: CEB Puerto Montt

Eugene Nathaniel Teague (born December 2, 1989) is an American professional basketball player.

== Early life ==
Teague was born in Brooklyn, New York.

== Club career ==
In September 2019, Teague signed with Kharkivski Sokoly of the Ukrainian Basketball Superleague.
