= Phillip O. Berry Academy of Technology =

American magnet high school in North Carolina

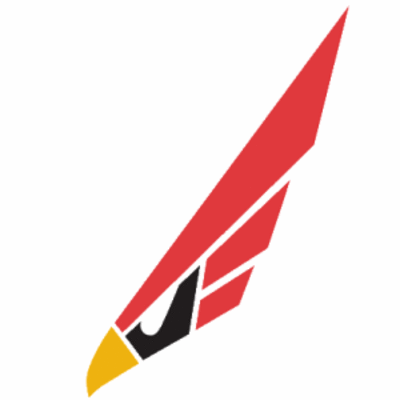

Location
- 1430 Alleghany Street; Charlotte, North Carolina 28208; United States; 35°14′20″N 80°53′31″W

Information
- Other names: Berry or POB
- Type: Public
- Motto: Next Step Ready
- Established: 2003 (23 years ago)
- School district: Charlotte-Mecklenburg Schools
- CEEB code: 340716
- NCES School ID: 370297002641
- Principal: Marvin Moore
- Staff: 113
- Grades: 9–12
- Enrollment: 1,552 (2022-23)
- Campus: 310,000 square feet (29,000 m^{2})
- Campus type: Urban
- Colours: Black, red and gold
- Athletics: NCHSAA 6A
- Athletics conference: Greater Metro 6A/7A
- Sports: Track & field, soccer, basketball, softball, volleyball, baseball, tennis, golf, wrestling, American football, swimming, cross country, cheerleading
- Mascot: Cardinal
- Rival: Harding University High School
- National ranking: 300
- Website: phillipoberryhs.cmsk12.org

Phillip O. Berry Academy of Technology (also known as Berry or POB) is a magnet high school located in Charlotte, North Carolina, United States. It is part of the Charlotte-Mecklenburg School System (CMS) and was opened in 2003. The mascot is a cardinal and the school colors are appropriately black and red (rarely, white and gold are thrown into the mix when more colors are necessary). The school is named after the educational activist Phillip O. Berry (1940–1984).

The overall mission statement is that education will be centered on a rigorous and relevant curriculum with focused human relations between students, parents, staff and the community. The school has a student body of 1,800–2,000 students, housed in a 310,000-square-foot (29,000 m^{2}) building.

Berry Academy is the only school in Mecklenburg County to offer AP Earth/Environmental course to freshman students. It is recognized as one of the few full magnet high schools in CMS. The school and Harding University High School are both located on Alleghany Street. As rivals, whenever Berry Academy and Harding University face each other in their American football game, it is known as the "Battle of Alleghany".

The school offers a rigorous and relevant technical curriculum that is divided into three career academies, where students place themselves based upon their interests: the academies of engineering, information technology and medical sciences and biotechnology. Programs not available at most other CMS high schools include biotechnology, advanced biotechnology, oracle database programming, automotive, construction, civil and electrical engineering technology and computer engineering technology.

In 2010, Phillip O. Berry was one of only six schools in the United States to win the National School Change Award. due to significant improvement.

== Notable alumni ==
- Khalia Braswell, computer scientist, technologist, founder of INTech
- Dajuan Graf, professional basketball player
- Alex Lake, contestant on season 1 of The Circle on Netflix
- Sean Mason, pianist, composer, 2025 Grammy Nominee, leader of the Sean Mason Quintet, distinguished Steinway Artist, Juilliard School alum
- Kendall Ramseur, 4th Place Winner of America's Got Talent, Cellist, Composer, Singer-Songwriter, Founding Member of Sons of Serendip
