= BC Kharkivski Sokoly =

Ukrainian basketball team

Kharkivski Sokoly
- Nickname: The Falcons (Ukrainian: Соколи)
- Leagues: Ukrainian Basketball Superleague
- Founded: 2017; 8 years ago
- History: Kharkivski Sokoly; 2017–present
- Arena: Sports Palace "Lokomotyv"
- Capacity: 4,000
- Location: Kharkiv, Ukraine
- Team colors: White, Navy Blie
- Main sponsor: Avantazh, SunOil, Porsche
- Head coach: (Ukraine) Aleksey Zolotous
- Team captain: (Ukraine) Igor Boyarkin
- Website: sokoly.club
Home	Away

Kharkivski Sokoly (Ukrainian: Харківські Соколи, lit. 'Kharkiv Falcons') is a Ukrainian basketball club based in Kharkiv. Founded in 2017, the team made its debut in the Ukrainian Basketball Superleague in 2019.

== History ==
Founded in 2017, Sokoly entered the Ukrainian Higher League, the country's second-tier league. In its first two seasons, the team finished 6th and 9th. After the 2018–19 season, Kharkiv based BC Politekhnik left the SuperLeague as it could not give financial guarantees. Instead, Sokoly received a spot for the 2019–20 campaign.

In July 2023 Aleksey Ivanovich Zolotous agreed with the club's management and will lead the "Kharkiv Falcons" in the 2023/2024 season during performances in the Higher League of Ukraine.

== Season by season ==
Key
Playoff berth

Season	Tier	League	Finish	Wins	Losses	Win%	Playoffs	Ukrainian Cup	Head coach
Kharkivski Sokoly
2018–19	2	Higher League	9th	19	18	.514	DNQ	–	Oleh Manoylenko
2019–20 (Note: The 2019–20 season was ended early due to the COVID-19 pandemic.)	1	SuperLeague	9th	4	22	.154	DNQ	Round of 16 (eliminated by Politekhnik)	Volodymyr Koval; Yevgen Murzin; Oleh Manoylenko
2020–21	1	SuperLeague	10th	9	31	.225	DNQ		Oleh Manoylenko; Renatas Kurilionokas

== Players ==
=== Current roster ===
Kharkivski Sokoly roster
Players
Coaches

Pos.	No.	Nat.	Name	Ht.	Wt.	Age
PG	2	(Ukraine)	Iskenderov, Artur	1.85 m (6 ft 1 in)	75 kg (165 lb)	22 – 7 March 2003
PG	3	(Ukraine)	Boyarkin, Igor (C)	1.80 m (5 ft 11 in)	85 kg (187 lb)	29 – 13 June 1995
PF	8	(Ukraine)	Shevchenko, Volodymyr	2.02 m (6 ft 8 in)	98 kg (216 lb)	30 – 3 December 1994
PF	10	(Ukraine)	Misyats, Oleksandr	2.02 m (6 ft 8 in)	100 kg (220 lb)	33 – 6 January 1992
SG	12	(Ukraine)	Musiyenko, Anton	1.92 m (6 ft 4 in)	85 kg (187 lb)	27 – 31 October 1997
SF	15	(United States)	Boggs, Brandon	1.95 m (6 ft 5 in)	86 kg (190 lb)	32 – 11 July 1992
PF/C	21	(Ukraine)	Chumakov, Igor	2.08 m (6 ft 10 in)	105 kg (231 lb)	35 – 13 February 1990
SG	22	(United States)	Paige, J.D.	1.90 m (6 ft 3 in)	75 kg (165 lb)	29 – 16 February 1996
SF	25	(Ukraine)	Niemtsu, Illia	1.98 m (6 ft 6 in)	95 kg (209 lb)	26 – 30 July 1998
C	30	(United States)	Pressley, Jervon	2.03 m (6 ft 8 in)	119 kg (262 lb)	32 – 16 December 1992
PF	32	(Ukraine)	Bondarenko, Mykyta	2.00 m (6 ft 7 in)	87 kg (192 lb)	24 – 28 April 2000
PF	37	(Ukraine)	Tarasenko, Oleksandr (injured)	2.03 m (6 ft 8 in)	90 kg (198 lb)	28 – 8 April 1996
PG	92	(United States)	Graf, Dajuan	1.82 m (6 ft 0 in)	84 kg (185 lb)	32 – 16 December 1992
C	99	(Ukraine)	Anisimov, Valerii	2.10 m (6 ft 11 in)	115 kg (254 lb)	34 – 25 July 1990

Head coach

- (Ukraine) Aleksey Zolotous

Assistant coach(es)

- (Ukraine) Oleh Manoylenko
- (Ukraine) Volodymyr Chursin

Legend

- (C) Team captain
- Injured

- Roster
Updated: 6 March 2021

=== Depth chart ===
Pos.	Starting 5	Bench 1	Bench 2	Bench 3
C	Jervon Pressley	Igor Chumakov	Valerii Anisimov
PF	Volodymyr Shevchenko	Brandon Boggs	Oleksandr Tarasenko	Mykyta Bondarenko
SF	Oleksandr Misyats	Illia Niemtsu
SG	J.D. Paige	Anton Musiyenko
PG	Igor Boyarkin	Dajuan Graf	Artur Iskenderov

4+8 formula (colours: Ukrainian players; foreign players;)

=== Squad changes 2020/2021 ===
==== In ====
No.	Pos.	Nat.	Name	Age	Moving from		Type	Ends	Transfer fee	Date	Source
25	SF	(Ukraine)	Illia Niemtsu	22	Zaporizhya	(Ukraine)	1 year	2021	Free	22 Jul 2020	
10	PF/C	(Ukraine)	Oleksandr Misyats	28	Prometey	(Ukraine)	1 year	2021	Free	24 Jul 2020	
32	PF	(United States)	LaRon Dendy	31	APOEL	(Cyprus)	1 year	2021	Free	29 Jul 2020	
92	PG	(United States)	Dajuan Graf	27	VfL Kirchheim Knights	(Germany)	1 year	2021	Free	31 Jul 2020	
8	PF	(Ukraine)	Volodymyr Shevchenko	25	Zaporizhya	(Ukraine)	1 year	2021	Free	5 Aug 2020	
21	PF/C	(Ukraine)	Igor Chumakov	30	Dnipro	(Ukraine)	1 year	2021	Free	10 Aug 2020	
15	SF	(United States)	Brandon Boggs	28	Kobrat	(Finland)	1 year	2021	Free	18 Aug 2020	
30	C	(United States)	Jervon Pressley	28	Zaporizhya	(Ukraine)	1 year	2021	Free	19 Jan 2021	
22	SG	(United States)	J.D. Paige	25	Ponte Prizreni	(Kosovo)	1 year	2021	Free	27 Feb 2021	
99	C	(Ukraine)	Valerii Anisimov	30	Kryvbas	(Ukraine)	1 year	2021	Free	27 Jan 2021	

==== Out ====
No.	Pos.	Nat.	Name	Age	Moving to		Type	Transfer fee	Date	Source
15	C	(Ukraine)	Dmytro Tykhonov	27	BC Zaporizhya	(Ukraine)		mutual consent	18 Jun 2020	
47	PF/C	(Ukraine)	Oleksandr Tishchenko	31	Ternopil	(Ukraine)		mutual consent	12 Aug 2020	
23	PF/C	(United States)	Delwan Graham	31	Ironi Ramat Gan	(Israel)		mutual consent	8 October 2020	
32	SG	(United States)	Kareem Jamar	27				mutual consent		
22	SG	(United States)	Zach Jackson	22	Leicester Riders	(United Kingdom)		mutual consent		
13	SG	(Ukraine)	Roman Kozlov	29	Budivelnyk	(Ukraine)		mutual consent		
17	PG	(Ukraine)	Andrii Shapovalov	27	Kryvbas	(Ukraine)		mutual consent		
32	PF/C	(United States)	LaRon Dendy	32				mutual consent	15 Jan 2021	

=== Squad changes 2019/2020 ===
==== In ====
No.	Pos.	Nat.	Name	Age	Moving from		Type	Ends	Transfer fee	Date	Source
47	PF	(Ukraine)	Dmytro Lypovtsev	33	Cherkaski Mavpy	(Ukraine)	1 year	2020	Free	19 Aug 2019	
13	SG	(Ukraine)	Roman Kozlov	29	BC Politekhnik	(Ukraine)	1 year	2020	Free	20 Aug 2019	
3	PG	(Ukraine)	Igor Boyarkin	24	Cherkaski Mavpy	(Ukraine)	1 year	2020	Free	22 Aug 2019	
17	PG	(United States)	Deonte Burton	28	Bendigo Braves	(Australia)	1 year	2020	Free	28 Aug 2019	
8	PF	(Lithuania)	Paulius Žalys	24	Lafayette Leopards	(United States)	1 year	2020	Free	1 Sep 2019	
21	C	(United States)	Gene Teague	29	Toros de Aragua	(Venezuela)	1 year	2020	Free	2 Sep 2019	
37	PF	(Ukraine)	Oleksandr Tarasenko	23	BC Zaporizhya	(Ukraine)	1 year	2020	Free	3 Sep 2019	
22	SF	(United States)	Zach Jackson	23	Omaha Maverics	(United States)	1 year	2020	Free	5 Sep 2019	
17	PG	(Ukraine)	Andrii Shapovalov	26	Sokół Ostrów Mazowiecka	(Poland)	1 year	2020	Free	6 Sep 2019	
15	C	(Ukraine)	Dmytro Tykhonov	27	BC Barsy Atyrau	(Kazakhstan)	1 year	2020	Free	29 Sep 2019	
32	SG	(United States)	Kareem Jamar	27	Elitzur Yavne	(Israel)	1 year	2020	Free	30 Sep 2019	
47	PF	(Ukraine)	Oleksandr Tishchenko	30	Kyiv-Basket	(Ukraine)	1 year	2020	Free	16 Oct 2019	
12	SG	(Ukraine)	Anton Musiyenko	22	Kyiv-Basket	(Ukraine)	1 year	2020	On loan	28 Oct 2019	
31	PG	(United States)	DeAndre Burnett	25	Leicester Riders	(United Kingdom)	1 year	2020	Free	1 Dec 2019	
23	PF/C	(United States)	Delwan Graham	31	Al-Wehda Club	(Saudi Arabia)	1 year	2020	Free	25 Dec 2019	

==== Out ====
No.	Pos.	Nat.	Name	Age	Moving to		Type	Transfer fee	Date	Source
17	PG	(United States)	Deonte Burton	28				mutual consent	23 Sep 2019	
47	PF	(Ukraine)	Dmytro Lypovtsev	33	BC Zaporizhya	(Ukraine)		mutual consent	23 Oct 2019	
31	PG	(Ukraine)	Yaroslav Udodenko	32				mutual consent	Nov 2019	
8	PF	(Lithuania)	Paulius Žalys	24	Rapla KK	(Estonia)		mutual consent	Nov 2019	
21	C	(United States)	Gene Teague	30	CEB Puerto Montt	(Chile)		mutual consent	13 Dec 2019	
31	PG	(United States)	DeAndre Burnett	26	Free agent			mutual consent	24 Feb 2020	

== Notable players ==
- (Ukraine) Igor Boyarkin 1 season: 2019–20
- (United States) Delwan Graham 1 season: 2019–20
- (United States) Kareem Jamar 1 season: 2019–20
- Aleksandar Zečević
