= Oleksandr Tarasenko (basketball) =

Ukrainian basketball player

No. 37 – BC "Kharkivski Sokoly"
- Position: Power forward

Personal information
- Born: April 8, 1996 (age 30) Dnipro, Ukraine
- Listed height: 6 ft 8 in (2.03 m)
- Listed weight: 198 lb (90 kg)

Career information
- NBA draft: 2018: undrafted
- Playing career: 2016–present

Career history
- 2016–2017: Dnipro
- 2017–2018: BC Politekhnik
- 2018–2019: BC Zaporizhya
- 2019–: Kharkivski Sokoly

Oleksandr Tarasenko (Ukrainian: Олександр Тарасенко; born April 8, 1996) is a Ukrainian professional basketball player for the Kharkivski Sokoly.

== Professional career ==
Born in Dnipro, Oleksandr Tarasenko began his basketball career in the Ukrainian Basketball SuperLeague, with the BC Dnipro in season 2016-2017.

Before season 2018-2019, he joined to the BC Zaporizhya.

In September 2019, Tarasenko signed with the Ukrainian Basketball SuperLeague team Kharkivski Sokoly for the 2019–2020 season.
