= List of NCAA Division I women's basketball career blocks leaders =

In basketball, a block (short for blocked shot) occurs when a defender deflects or stops a field goal attempt without committing a foul. The top 25 highest blocks totals in National Collegiate Athletic Association (NCAA) Division I women's basketball history are listed below. While the NCAA's current three-division format has been in place since the 1973–74 season, the organization did not sponsor women's sports until the 1981–82 school year; before that time, women's college sports were governed by the Association of Intercollegiate Athletics for Women (AIAW). Blocks are a relatively new statistic in college basketball, having only become an official statistic in NCAA women's basketball beginning with the 1987–88 season.

No individual on the list is enshrined in the Naismith Memorial Basketball Hall of Fame as a player. Rebecca Lobo is a Hall of Fame member as a contributor.

All players listed played in four seasons; none were ever redshirted, and none transferred to a second school during their respective careers.

Three schools have two or more players represented on this list—Duke and UConn with three each, and Ohio State with two. Duke is represented by Alison Bales, Elizabeth Williams, and Bego Faz Davalos; UConn by Breanna Stewart, Lobo, and Kara Wolters; and Ohio State by Jessica Davenport and Brianne Turner.

== Key ==
Pos.	G	F	C	Ref.
Position	Guard	Forward	Center	References

Team (X)	Denotes the number of times a player from that team is represented on this list

== Top 25 career blocks leaders ==
Player	Position	Height	Team	Career start (Note: Reflects the calendar year in which the player's Division I career began. All listings of player records in official NCAA record books categorize seasons by the calendar years in which they ended.)	Career end	Games played	Blocks	BPG	Ref. (Note: Except as otherwise noted, references for each entry are from the most recent edition of the NCAA Division I women's basketball record book, cited in the "General references" section below.)
Brittney Griner	C	6 ft 8 in (2.03 m)	Baylor	2009	2013	148	748	5.1	
Louella Tomlinson	C	6 ft 4 in (1.93 m)	Saint Mary's	2007	2011	125	663	5.3	
Allyssa DeHaan	C	6 ft 9 in (2.06 m)	Michigan State	2006	2010	136	503	3.7	
Sandora Irvin	C	6 ft 3 in (1.91 m)	TCU	2002	2005	127	480	3.8	
Kailyn Williams	C	6 ft 4 in (1.93 m)	Bethune–Cookman	2013	2017	122	455	3.7	
Brooke McAfee	F	6 ft 2 in (1.88 m)	IUPUI	2002	2006	111	447	4.0	
Courtney Paris	C	6 ft 4 in (1.93 m)	Oklahoma	2005	2009	137	446	3.3	
Jasmine Joyner	F	6 ft 2 in (1.88 m)	Chattanooga	2013	2017	122	436	3.6	
Alison Bales	C	6 ft 7 in (2.01 m)	Duke	2003	2007	129	434	3.4	
Genia Miller	C	6 ft 3 in (1.91 m)	Cal State Fullerton	1987	1991	118	428	3.6	
Elizabeth Williams	F	6 ft 3 in (1.91 m)	Duke (2)	2011	2015	136	426	3.1	
Ruth Hamblin	C	6 ft 6 in (1.98 m)	Oregon State	2012	2016	132	425	3.2	
Breanna Stewart	F	6 ft 4 in (1.93 m)	UConn	2012	2016	152	414	2.7	
Heidi Gillingham	C	6 ft 10 in (2.08 m)	Vanderbilt	1990	1994	128	413	3.2	
Zane Teiläne	C	6 ft 7 in (2.01 m)	Western Illinois	2002	2006	106	406	3.8	
Rebecca Lobo (Note: As noted above, Lobo is a member of the Naismith Hall of Fame as a contributor instead of a player.)	C	6 ft 4 in (1.93 m)	UConn (Note: Officially known for athletic purposes as "Connecticut" before 2013–14.) (2)	1991	1995	126	396	3.1	
Brooke Flowers	C	6 ft 5 in (1.96 m)	Saint Louis	2019	2023	140	392	2.8	
Jessica Davenport	C	6 ft 5 in (1.96 m)	Ohio State	2003	2007	130	384	3.0	
Ae'Rianna Harris	F	6 ft 1 in (1.85 m)	Purdue	2017	2020	136	380	2.8	
Marita Payne	C	6 ft 5 in (1.96 m)	Auburn	2002	2006	122	377	3.1	
Chris Enger	C	6 ft 4 in (1.93 m)	San Diego	1989	1993	96	372	3.9	
Ashley Gayle	C	6 ft 4 in (1.93 m)	Texas	2008	2012	130	372	2.9	
Brianne Turner	F	6 ft 3 in (1.91 m)	Ohio State (2)	2015	2019	139	372	2.7	
Kara Wolters	C	6 ft 7 in (2.01 m)	UConn (3)	1993	1997	137	370	2.7	
Ruth Riley	C	6 ft 5 in (1.96 m)	Notre Dame	1997	2001	131	370	2.8	
