= 1980 San Miguel Beermen season =

- Head coach: Edgardo Ocampo
- Owner: San Miguel Corporation

Open Conference results
- Record: 4–14 (22.2%)
- Place: N/A
- Playoff finish: N/A

Invitational Championship results
- Record: 0–0
- Place: N/A
- Playoff finish: N/A

All Filipino Conference results
- Record: 5–9 (35.7%)
- Place: 6th
- Playoff finish: Round of six

San Miguel Beermen seasons

The 1980 San Miguel Beermen season was the 6th season of the franchise in the Philippine Basketball Association (PBA). Beginning the Third Conference, the ballclub will be known as San Miguel Beermen, a beer brand long been used by the company in the MICAA will finally makes its debut in the PBA.

== Transactions ==
ADDITIONS
Salvador Ramas and Biboy Ravanes ^{Rookies signed from their farm team in the MICAA}

== Summary ==
The defending champions bring back Otto Moore as their import in the Open Conference along with Bubba Wilson, a one-time backcourt man of the Golden State Warriors in the NBA. The Orangemen lost their first game to U-Tex but pick up their first win of the season four days after against Toyota Tamaraws, 93-84 on March 22. RTO ends up last in the conference and tied with Tanduay at the bottom of the standings after 18 games in the eliminations.

San Miguel advances in the round of six of the All-Filipino Conference and the Beermen lost all their five assignments in the quarterfinal phase of the tournament.

== Win–loss record vs opponents ==
Teams	Win	Loss	1st (Open)	3rd (All-Filipino)
Galleon Shippers	0	3	0-2	0-1
Gilbey’s Gin	2	2	1-1	1-1
Great Taste / Presto	1	2	0-2	1-0
Honda	2	1	1-1	1-0
Tanduay	1	3	1-1	0-2
Tefilin	1	2	0-2	1-0
Toyota Tamaraws	2	2	1-1	1-1
U-Tex Wranglers	0	4	0-2	0-2
Walk Tall / Crispa	0	4	0-2	0-2
Total	9	23	4-14	5-9

== Roster ==
1980 San Miguel Beermen roster
Players

Pos.	#	POB	Name	Height	Weight	DOB (YYYY–MM–DD)	From
F/C	5	(Philippines)	Jesus Migalbin	6 ft 3 in (1.91 m)			San Agustin
G/F	6	(Philippines)	Biboy Ravanes	6 ft 1 in (1.85 m)			Cebu
G	7	(Philippines)	Antonio Torrente	6 ft 1 in (1.85 m)
G	8	(Philippines)	Ramon Dizon	6 ft 0 in (1.83 m)			PSBA
F	11	(Philippines)	Salvador Ramas	6 ft 1 in (1.85 m)			Cebu
G	12	(Philippines)	Danilo Salvador	5 ft 9 in (1.75 m)			San Sebastian
F	13	(Philippines)	Teodulfo Gregorio	6 ft 3 in (1.91 m)			Mapúa
G	14	(Philippines)	Yoyong Martirez	5 ft 8 in (1.73 m)			Southwestern-U
F/C	15	(Philippines)	Rodolfo Lalota	6 ft 3 in (1.91 m)			Mapúa
G	16	(Philippines)	Leonardo Paguntalan	6 ft 1 in (1.85 m)			Western Institute
F	17	(Philippines)	Evalson Valencia	6 ft 1 in (1.85 m)			Western Institute
G	25	(United States)	Bubba Wilson (I)	6 ft 2 in (1.88 m)			Western Carolina
C	34	(United States)	Otto Moore (I)	6 ft 10 in (2.08 m)			Texas

Coaches

Head coach

- (Philippines) Edgardo Ocampo

Assistant coach(es)

Legend

- (C) Team captain
- (I) Import
- Injured
