= Louella Tomlinson =

Australian basketball player

Personal information
- Born: 8 April 1988 (age 38) Melbourne, Victoria
- Listed height: 193 cm (6 ft 4 in)

Career information
- High school: Lake Ginninderra (Canberra, ACT)
- College: Saint Mary's (2007–2011)
- WNBA draft: 2011: undrafted
- Playing career: 2004–2021
- Position: Center

Career history
- 2004–2007: AIS
- 2011–2012: Dandenong Rangers
- 2012–2013: Napoli Basket
- 2013–2014: PINKK-Pécsi 424
- 2014–2015: West Coast Waves
- 2015–2016: Perth Lynx
- 2016: Campus Promete Logrono
- 2016–2017: Diósgyőri VTK
- 2017–2018: Melbourne Boomers
- 2018–2019: Bendigo Spirit
- 2019–2020: Southside Flyers
- 2020–2021: Adelaide Lightning

Career highlights
- Hungarian League champion (2014); WNBL champion (2012); 3× First-team All-WCC (2009–2011); 2× WCC Defensive Player of the Year (2009, 2010); WCC All-Freshman Team (2008)
Medals
Representing Australia
Basketball
World University Games
Bronze medal – third place	2009 Belgrade	Team
Bronze medal – third place	2011 Shenzhen	Team

Louella Brooke Tomlinson (born 8 April 1988) is an Australian former professional basketball player. She retired in June 2021.

== Early life and career ==
Tomlinson was born and raised in the Melbourne suburb of Fitzroy, Victoria. She moved to Canberra in 2004 on a scholarship to the Australian Institute of Sport (AIS) and attended Lake Ginninderra College. Tomlinson debuted in the WNBL with the AIS during the 2004–05 season, but played minimal minutes in her first season. She played a further two seasons with the AIS before departing to play college basketball in the United States.

== College career ==
Between 2007 and 2011, Tomlinson played at Saint Mary's College of California. As a senior (fourth and final season) with the Gaels in 2010–11, she averaged 14.1 points, 9.5 rebounds, 2.5 assists and 4.7 blocks in 32 games. She earned conference Defensive Player of the Year honours two times, and first-team All-West Coast Conference honours three times. Tomlinson ended her U.S. college career as the sole leader in career blocks in NCAA Division I women's basketball with 663, and the joint leader in career D-I triple-doubles alongside former Penn State star Suzie McConnell with 7. The blocks record fell during the 2012–13 season to Baylor's Brittney Griner, who finished her college career with 748. The triple-doubles record fell to Oregon's Sabrina Ionescu, who surpassed the career record as a sophomore (second-year player) in 2017–18 and ended her college career in 2020 with 26.

=== Saint Mary's statistics ===
Ratios
Year	Team	GP	FG%	3P%	FT%	RBG	APG	BPG	SPG	PPG
2007-08	Saint Mary's	32	41.2%	29.6%	69.5%	6.25	1.38	4.88	0.44	13.00
2008-09	Saint Mary's	30	40.8%	40.9%	69.7%	9.20	1.93	5.37	0.93	15.20
2009-10	Saint Mary's	31	50.9%	33.3%	73.5%	11.07	2.61	6.29	0.68	16.90
2010-11	Saint Mary's	32	52.1%	15.8%	65.6%	9.44	2.47	4.72	0.59	14.13
Career		125	45.9%	30.1%	69.7%	8.97	2.10	5.30	0.66	14.78

Totals
Year	Team	GP	FG	FGA	3P	3PA	FT	FTA	REB	A	BK	ST	PTS
2007-08	Saint Mary's	32	155	376	8	27	98	141	200	44	156	14	416
2008-09	Saint Mary's	30	173	424	9	22	101	145	276	58	161	28	456
2009-10	Saint Mary's	31	193	379	5	15	133	181	343	81	195	21	524
2010-11	Saint Mary's	32	173	332	3	19	103	157	302	79	151	19	452
Career		125	694	1511	25	83	435	624	1121	262	663	82	1848

== Professional career ==
=== WNBL ===
Tomlinson returned to Australia to begin her professional career, joining the Dandenong Rangers for the 2011–12 WNBL season. In 22 games on the season, she averaged 3.1 points and 2.9 rebounds per game, helping the Rangers win the championship alongside Jenna O'Hea and Kathleen MacLeod. Tomlinson returned to Australia for the 2014–15 WNBL season, moving to Perth to join the West Coast Waves. An injury plagued season limited her to just 12 games, averaging 12.4 points and 6.0 rebounds per game. The Waves were rebranded as the Perth Lynx in 2015 and Tomlinson signed on with the new program. On 17 October 2015, she scored a career-high 29 points against the Melbourne Boomers, which earned her a spot on the Round 2 WNBL Team of the Week. On 13 January 2016, she was ruled out for four to six weeks with an ankle injury. She returned to the line-up for the team's final three games of the regular season, helping the Lynx finish second on the ladder with a 16–8 win–loss record. The Lynx went on to defeat the first-seeded Townsville Fire in the semi-finals, thus advancing to the WNBL grand final for the first time since 1999. There they were outclassed by the defending champion Townsville (who made it to the grand final via the preliminary final), losing the best-of-three series 2–0. In 23 games for the Lynx in 2015–16, she averaged 9.0 points, 5.3 rebounds, 1.4 assists and 2.0 blocks per game. Tomlinson will return home to Victoria after a year abroad in Europe, after signing with the Melbourne Boomers for the 2017–18 WNBL season.

After two one-season stints in Bendigo and Southside respectively, Tomlinson then signed with the Adelaide Lightning for the 2020–21 season.

=== Europe ===
For the 2012–13 season, Tomlinson played in Italy for Napoli Basket where she averaged 14.7 points, 12.9 rebounds, 2.1 steals and 3.4 blocks in 29 games. She moved to Hungary for the 2013–14 season, joining PINKK-Pécsi 424. She helped her Hungarian club win the league championship behind averages of 14.2 points, 6.0 rebounds, 1.6 assists and 2.7 blocks per game. In July 2016, Tomlinson signed with Campus Promete Logrono of the Spanish Liga Femenina de Baloncesto. However, her tenure was short lived as then she returned to Hungary after signing with Diósgyőri VTK for the remainder of the 2016–17 season.

== See also ==
- List of NCAA Division I women's basketball career blocks leaders
- List of NCAA Division I basketball career triple-doubles leaders
