= Delwan Graham =

American basketball player

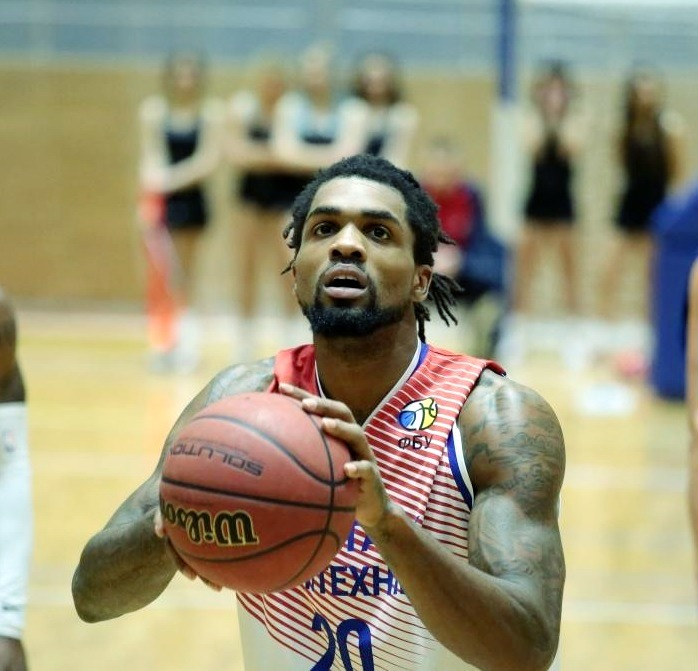

Al-Shorta
- Position: Power forward/center
- League: Iraqi Basketball League

Personal information
- Born: October 27, 1988 (age 38) Atlanta, Georgia
- Listed height: 6 ft 7 in (2.01 m)
- Listed weight: 220 lb (100 kg)

Career information
- College: Jacksonville (2010–2012)
- NBA draft: 2012: undrafted
- Playing career: 2012–present

Career history
- 2012–2013: UCC Demons
- 2013–2014: UL Eagles
- 2014: Knox Raiders
- 2015: Nunawading Spectres
- 2016–2018: Temperley
- 2018–2019: Politekhnik
- 2019: Chongqing Huaxi International
- 2019: Al Wehda
- 2019–2020: Kharkivski Sokoly
- 2020–2021: Maccabi Ramat Gan
- 2021–2022: Sharjah
- 2022: Llaneros de Guárico
- 2022–2023: Olimpia
- 2023: REG
- 2023–present: Al-Shorta

Career highlights
- 2× Ukrainian League All-Star (2019, 2020)

Delwan Donte Graham (born October 27, 1988) is an American professional basketball player who currently plays for Al-Shorta.

== Club career ==
In December 2019, Graham returned to Kharkiv and signed with Kharkivski Sokoly.

On February 21, 2023, Graham joined Rwandan club REG ahead of the 2023 BAL season.
