= DeAndre Burnett =

American basketball player

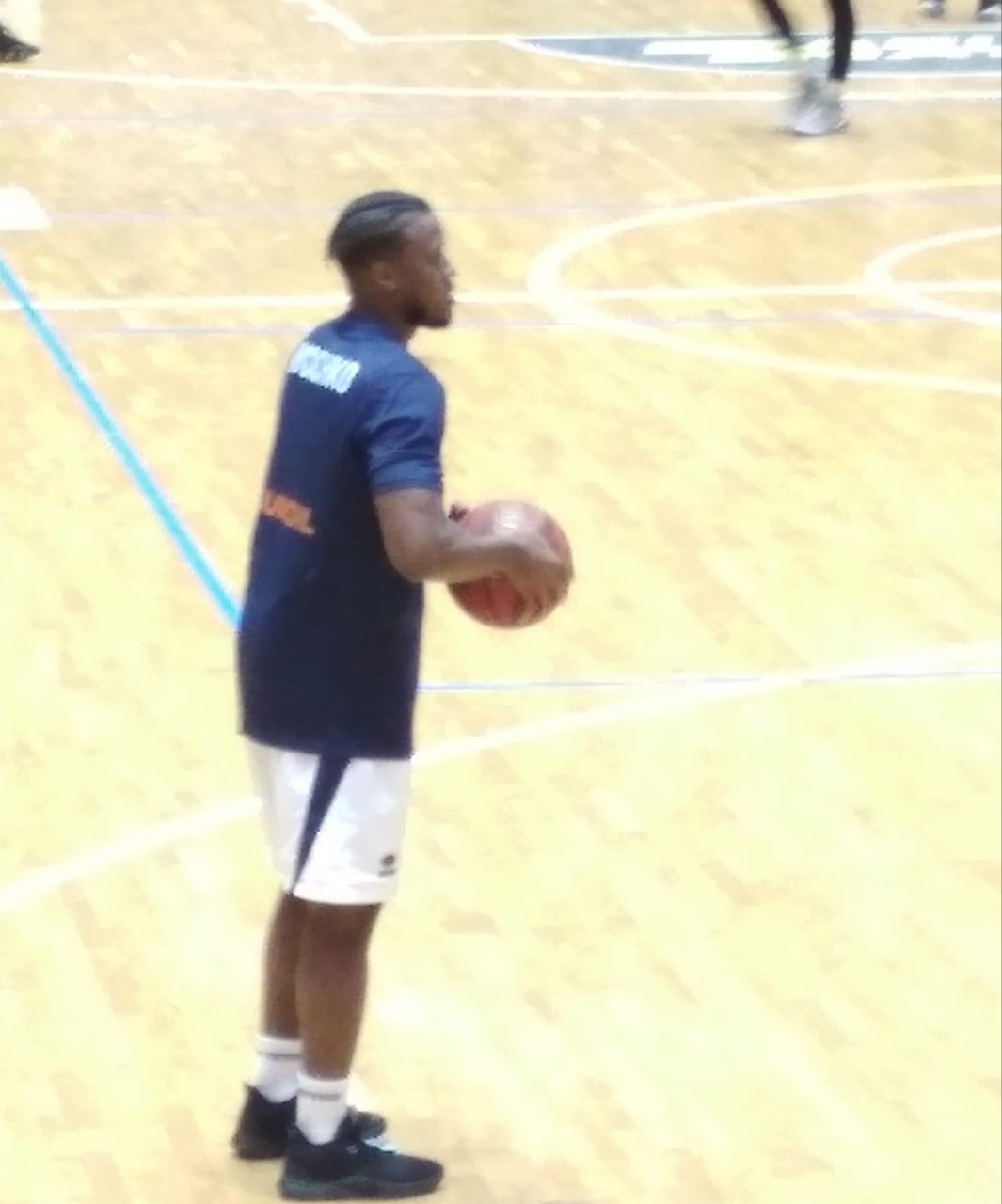

Free agent
- Position: Point guard

Personal information
- Born: January 21, 1994 (age 32) Miami Gardens, Florida, U.S.
- Listed height: 6 ft 3 in (1.91 m)
- Listed weight: 192 lb (87 kg)

Career information
- High school: Carol City (Miami Gardens, Florida); Massanutten Military Academy (Woodstock, Virginia)
- College: Miami (Florida) (2014–2015); Ole Miss (2016–2018)
- NBA draft: 2018: undrafted
- Playing career: 2018–present

Career history
- 2018–2019: Leicester Riders
- 2019–2020: Kharkivski Sokoly

DeAndre Burnett (born January 21, 1994) is an American former professional basketball player.

== Early life ==
Burnett was born in Miami Gardens, Florida. His brothers are Dallas Cowboys running back Dalvin Cook, and Buffalo Bills starting running back, James Cook

== College career ==
Burnett averaged 7.0 points per game as a redshirt freshman for the Miami Hurricanes, making 28 three-pointers. He scored a season-high 21 points against Wisconsin-Green Bay. After the season, Burnett decided to transfer to Ole Miss. Burnett averaged 16.5 points and 3.2 assists per game but was sidelined by a late-season leg injury. As a senior, Burnett averaged 13.5 points and 3.9 assists per game shooting 36% from behind the arc.

== Professional career ==
On September 19, 2018, Burnett signed with the Leicester Riders of the British Basketball League as a replacement for the injured Niem Stevenson. In November 2019, Burnett signed with Kharkivska Sokoly of the Ukrainian Basketball Superleague. He parted ways with the team on February 24, 2020.
