= Vonterius Woolbright =

American basketball player (born 2000)

Free agent
- Position: Point guard

Personal information
- Born: October 6, 2000 (age 26)
- Listed height: 6 ft 6 in (1.98 m)
- Listed weight: 215 lb (98 kg)

Career information
- High school: Thomasville (Thomasville, Georgia)
- College: Lawson State CC (2019–2021); Western Carolina (2021–2024)
- Playing career: 2024–present

Career history
- 2024: KB Bora
- 2025–2026: Ármann

Career highlights
- SoCon Player of the Year (2024); First-team All-SoCon (2024); Second-team All-SoCon (2023)

Vonterius Woolbright (born October 6, 2000) is an American professional basketball player who is a free agent. He played college basketball for the Lawson State Community College Cougars and the Western Carolina Catamounts.

== High school career ==
Woolbright attended Thomasville High School. As a junior, he helped lead the Bulldogs to the GSHA Class AA State Championship, scoring 17 points in the title game. Woolbright committed to play college basketball at Lawson State Community College.

== College career ==
As a freshman, Woolbright averaged 8.3 points, 2.3 rebounds, and 2.3 assists per game. He averaged 17.4 points, 8.6 rebounds, and 7.7 assists per game as a sophomore, earning National Junior College Athletic Association Honorable Mention All-America honors. Woolbright committed to transfer to Western Carolina He averaged 9.7 points, 5.8 rebounds, and 3.9 assists per game as a junior on a team that finished 11–21. As a senior, Woolbright averaged 14.5 points. 7.4 rebounds, and 5.1 assists per game. He was named Preseason SoCon Player of the Year. On January 31, 2024, Woolbright scored a career-high 36 points in a 91–85 loss to Chattanooga. He averaged 21.1 points and 12 rebounds per game and earned SoCon Player of the Year honors.

== Professional career ==
On October 25, 2024, Woolbright joined the Delaware Blue Coats. He was waived by the team on November 4.

In December 2024, he appeared in four games for KB Bora in the Kosovo Basketball Superleague. In December 2025, he joined Úrvalsdeild karla club Ármann. He left the team in early January after averaging 8.8 points, 6.3 rebounds and 4.5 assists in four games.

== See also ==
- List of NCAA Division I basketball career triple-doubles leaders
