= Lokomotyv Sports Palace =

Indoor arena in the eastern Ukrainian city Kharkiv

Coordinates: 50°0′0″N 36°12′18″E

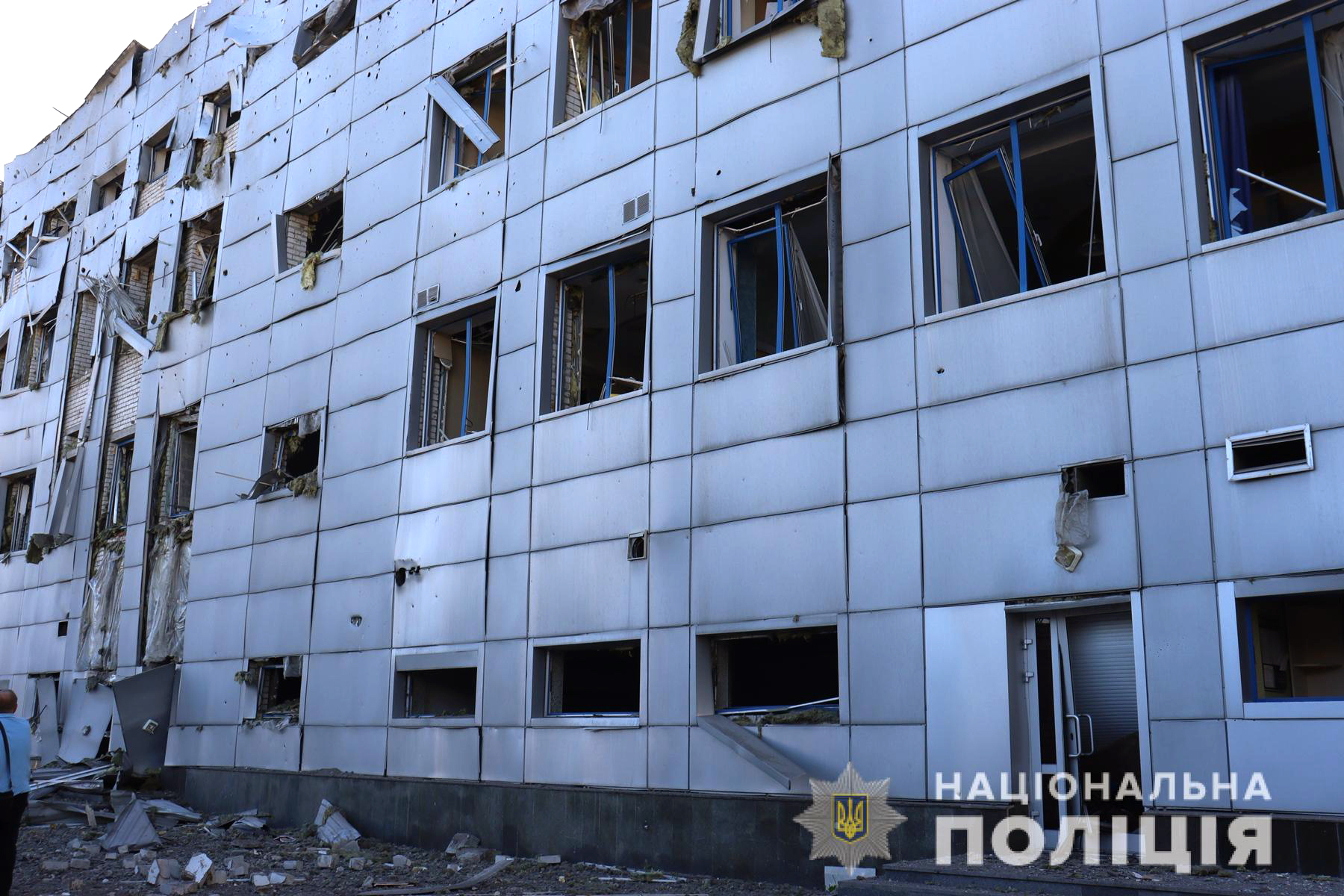
Palace of sports Lokomotyv after Russian shelling, 2022-09-02 (03).

Palace of Sports "Lokomotyv" (Ukrainian: Палац спорту «Локомотив») is an indoor arena in the eastern Ukrainian city Kharkiv. Rebuilt in 2004, it has a seating capacity for 4,000 people.

It is the home for the matches of the Ukrainian Fed Cup team, volleyball and it is also used for boxing matches. The arena is the regular home venue of basketball club Kharkivski Sokoly, futsal team MFK Lokomotiv Kharkiv and Lokomotiv Kharkiv volleyball team.

On 2 September 2022, the Palace was partially destroyed by Russian rocket strike. It was later restored
