= Anquell McCollum =

American basketball player and coach (born 1973)

Elizabeth City State Vikings
- Title: Assistant coach
- League: CIAA

Personal information
- Born: 1973 (age 52–53) Fayetteville, North Carolina, U.S.
- Listed height: 6 ft 1 in (1.85 m)

Career information
- High school: E. E. Smith (Fayetteville, North Carolina)
- College: Western Carolina (1992–1996)
- NBA draft: 1996: undrafted
- Playing career: 1996–2000
- Position: Shooting guard

Career history

Playing
- 1996: TC Tropics
- 1996–1997: Nantes
- 1998–1999: Toros de Aragua
- 2000: CDP Domingo Paulino Santiago

Coaching
- 2004–2018: Western Carolina (assistant)
- 2018–2019: Freedom Christian Academy
- 2019–2025: Fayetteville State (assistant)
- 2025–present: Elizabeth City State (assistant)

Career highlights
- SoCon Player of the Year (1996); 2× First-team All-SoCon (1995, 1996); SoCon tournament MVP (1996)

Anquell McCollum (born 1973) is an American college basketball assistant coach for Elizabeth City State University. McCollum previously coached college and high school basketball, and as a professional player he competed in numerous countries during a four-year career between 1996 and 2000. His collegiate career at Western Carolina University was also successful, as he was named the Southern Conference Player of the Year in 1996.

== Early life ==
A native of Fayetteville, North Carolina, McCollum attended his hometown's E. E. Smith High School. In a game played on March 5, 1992, he set a then-state record with 24 three-point field goal attempts, which was later broken in 2004. Of the 24 attempts, McCollum made 11, which was also a state record at the time.

== College and professional careers ==
McCollum played for the Western Carolina Catamounts between 1992–93 and 1995–96. As a freshman he secured a Southern Conference (SoCon) All-Freshmen Team selection. Between his sophomore and senior seasons, McCollum earned three All-SoCon tournament selections, was a two-time First Team All-SoCon player, and in 1995–96 he was named both the conference player of the year as well as the conference tournament's MVP. That season, McCollum averaged 25 points per game (ranked fifth nationally) and led the Catamounts to one of the most historic seasons in school history. Western Carolina began the 1995–96 season with a 3–10 overall record, but rattled off 11 wins in their final 13 games to clinch the Southern Conference South Division title with a 10–4 conference record; that was the school's first-ever SoCon basketball title. The Catamounts then went on to win all three SoCon Tournament games, including a win over Davidson, who at the time was on a 19-game winning streak. By winning the 1996 SoCon Tournament (of which McCollum was named MVP), Western Carolina clinched its first NCAA tournament berth. In the 1996 NCAA tournament, Western Carolina nearly became the first #16-seed to defeat a #1-seed when they narrowly lost to Purdue 73–71 in the opening round.

Following his collegiate career, McCollum did not get selected in the 1996 NBA draft. He instead played professionally overseas, spending time in five countries in four years before returning home to play in the United States Basketball League – his final stop before retiring. McCollum played in France (1996–97), Venezuela (1997–99), Colombia (1998), Hong Kong (1998), and the Dominican Republic (2000) during his tenure.

== Coaching career ==
After returning to the United States in 2000, he returned to Western Carolina University to finish attaining his degree in Computer Information Systems. Between 2000 and 2004, and aside from obtaining his degree, McCollum worked as a middle school computer skills teacher and then as an assistant director of admissions for Western Carolina. In 2004–05 he became an official assistant coach for the men's basketball team at his alma mater, a position he held for 14 seasons. In 2018–19 he spent one season as the head coach for Freedom Christian Academy in Fayetteville, North Carolina. The next year, he accepted an assistant coaching position at Fayetteville State University, where he stayed through the 2024–25 season. He left Fayetteville to become an assistant coach at Elizabeth City State University.
