= Greg Wittman =

American basketball player

Personal information
- Born: May 10, 1947 (age 79) Rockingham, North Carolina, U.S.
- Listed height: 6 ft 8 in (2.03 m)
- Listed weight: 210 lb (95 kg)

Career information
- High school: Rockingham County (Rockingham, North Carolina)
- College: Western Carolina (1966–1969)
- NBA draft: 1969: 7th round, 88th overall pick
- Drafted by: Seattle SuperSonics
- Position: Power forward
- Number: 54, 22, 31

Career history
- 1969–1970: Denver Rockets
- 1970: The Floridians
- 1970: Texas Chaparrals
- Stats at Basketball Reference

H. Gregory Wittman (born May 10, 1947) is an American former professional basketball player. He played in the American Basketball Association for three teams during the 1969–70 and 1970–71 seasons. In his ABA career, Wittman scored 212 points.
