= BC Politekhnik =

Politekhnik
- Founded: 1991; 34 years ago
- History: List: Budilvenyk-HOVUFKS 1991–1992 Polytechnic 1994–present
- Arena: Lokomotiv PS
- Location: Kharkiv, Ukraine
- Championships: 1 Higher League
- Website: bcap.kh.ua

BC Politekhnik, (Ukrainian: Політехнік) is a Ukrainian basketball club based in Kharkiv. Established in 1991, it played in the Ukrainian Basketball SuperLeague in 1992, 2004–2007 and 2016–2019.

== History ==
After the 2018–19 season, Politekhnik left the SuperLeague as it could not give financial guarantees. Instead, Kharkivski Sokoly from the city of Kharkiv received a spot for the 2019–20 campaign.

In 2021–22 season, the club plays in the third division of Ukrainian basketball.

== Honours ==
Ukrainian Higher League

- Winners (1): 2015–16

== Season by season ==
Playoff berth

| Season | Tier | League | Finish | Wins | Losses | Win% | Playoffs | Other competitions | Head coach |
|---|---|---|---|---|---|---|---|---|---|
BC Politekhnik
| 2016–17 | 1 | SuperLeague | 10th | 3 | 24 | .111 | – | – | |
| 2017–18 | 1 | SuperLeague | 7th | 7 | 21 | .250 | Lost quarterfinals (Cherkaski Mavpy), 0–2 | – | |
| 2018–19 | 1 | SuperLeague | 7th | 9 | 19 | .321 | Lost quarterfinals (Khimik), 0–2 | – | |

== Players ==
=== Current squad ===
BC Politekhnik roster
Players
Coaches

| Pos. | No. | Nat. | Name | Ht. | Wt. | Age |
|---|---|---|---|---|---|---|
| G | | (Ukraine) | Fisun, Vladyslav | | | 22 – 9 October 2002 |
| F | 1 | (Ukraine) | Riznychenko, Bohdan | | | 23 – 24 April 2001 |
| F | 3 | (Ukraine) | Stalmakov, Mykyta | 1.90 m (6 ft 3 in) | 70 kg (154 lb) | 22 – 10 July 2002 |
| F | 4 | (Ukraine) | Popov, Yehor | 1.94 m (6 ft 4 in) | | 24 – 3 March 2001 |
| C | 5 | (Ukraine) | Kolotilov, Viktor | 2.05 m (6 ft 9 in) | | 27 – 24 October 1997 |
| G | 8 | (Ukraine) | Kuznetsov, Serhii | 2.03 m (6 ft 8 in) | | 27 – 23 October 1997 |
| | 9 | (Ukraine) | Shalamov, Andrii | 2.02 m (6 ft 8 in) | 106 kg (234 lb) | 29 – 29 January 1996 |
| PF | 9 | (Ukraine) | Sharko, Mykhailo | 2.08 m (6 ft 10 in) | | 29 – 6 September 1995 |
| G | 10 | (Ukraine) | Savchenko, Yevhenii | 1.90 m (6 ft 3 in) | | 27 – 30 May 1997 |
| F | 11 | (Ukraine) | Chuhunov, Illia | 1.86 m (6 ft 1 in) | | 27 – 5 July 1997 |
| PG | 13 | (United States) | Bradford, Christian Alexander | 1.85 m (6 ft 1 in) | | 29 – 9 July 1995 |
| G | 13 | (Ukraine) | Khrysostomidi, Rafail | | | 22 – 25 September 2002 |
| F | 14 | (Ukraine) | Pavlenko, Borys | 1.87 m (6 ft 2 in) | 90 kg (198 lb) | 27 – 6 May 1997 |
| PF | 15 | (Ukraine) | Rochniak, Anton (C) | 2.05 m (6 ft 9 in) | 96 kg (212 lb) | 33 – 2 July 1991 |
| G | 17 | (Ukraine) | Pyvovar, Yaroslav | | | 21 – 25 October 2003 |
| PF | 19 | (United States) | Banks, Isaac | 2.01 m (6 ft 7 in) | | 30 – 21 November 1994 |

Head coach

- (Ukraine) Tymur Arabadzhy

Assistant coach(es)

Athletic trainer(s)

Doctor

Manager

Legend

- (C) Team captain
- Injured

- Roster
Updated: 30 January 2020

== Notable players ==
- (Ukraine) Roman Kozlov 7 seasons: 2012–19
- (United States) Delwan Graham 1 season: 2018–19
