= Kareem Jamar =

American basketball player (born 1992)

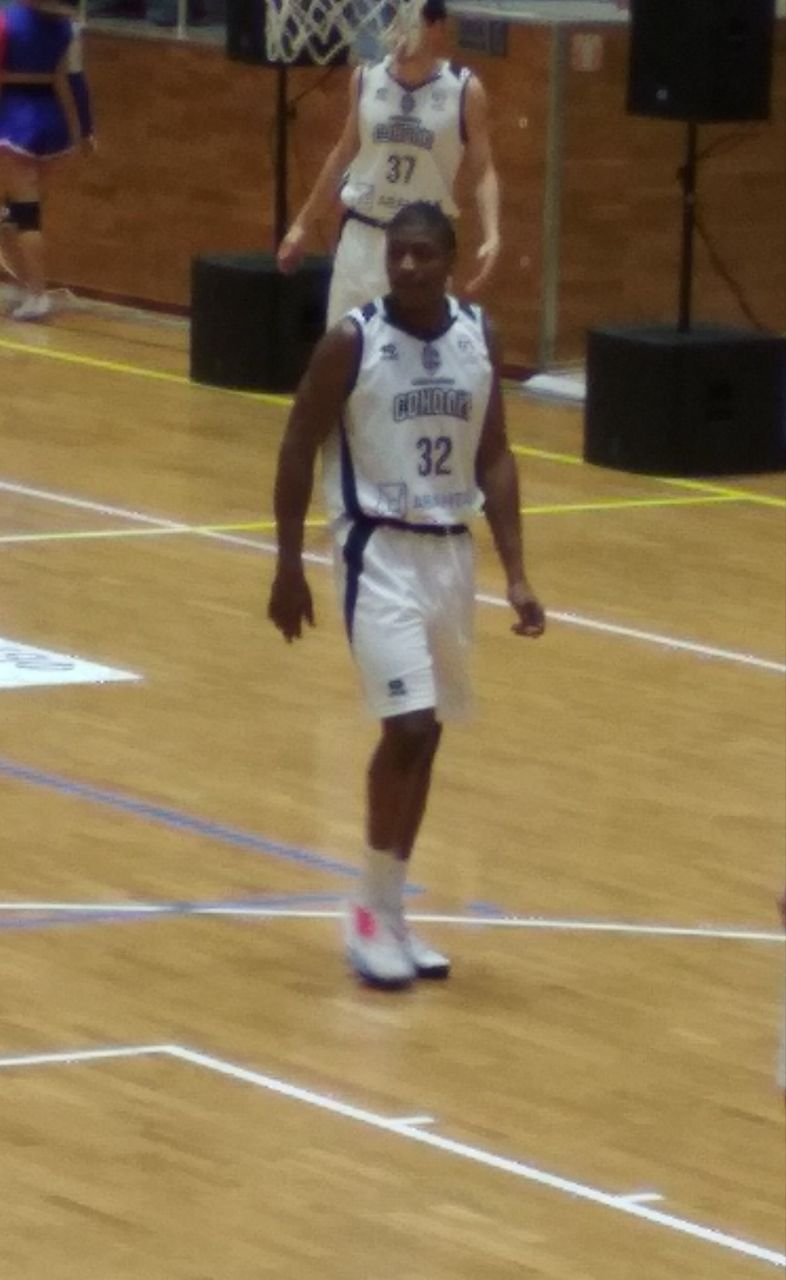
- Jamar with Kharkivski Sokoly in 2019

No. 4 – Kapfenberg Bulls
- Position: Shooting guard / small forward
- League: Austrian Basketball Bundesliga

Personal information
- Born: October 16, 1992 (age 34)
- Listed height: 6 ft 5 in (1.96 m)
- Listed weight: 210 lb (95 kg)

Career information
- High school: Westchester (Los Angeles, California)
- College: Montana (2010–2014)
- NBA draft: 2014: undrafted
- Playing career: 2014–present

Career history
- 2014–2015: Kolossos Rodou
- 2015–2016: Omonia Nicosia
- 2016–2018: Kapfenberg Bulls
- 2018–2019: Elitzur Yavne
- 2019–2021: Kharkivski Sokoly
- 2021–present: Kapfenberg Bulls

Career highlights
- 2× Austrian League champion (2017, 2018); 2× Austrian Cup winner (2017, 2018); Austrian Supercup winner (2017); Big Sky Player of the Year (2013); AP Honorable mention All-American (2013); 3× First-team All-Big Sky (2012–2014)

Kareem Jamar (born October 16, 1992) is an American basketball player for Kapfenberg Bulls of the Austrian Basketball Bundesliga. He played college basketball at the University of Montana, where he was named an honorable mention All-American and the Big Sky Conference Player of the Year in 2013.

== High school ==
Jamar played high school basketball at Westchester High School in Los Angeles, where he was a key player on two California state championship teams.

== College career ==
For college, he chose Montana and coach Wayne Tinkle. As a freshman, started 18 games and averaged 8.1 points and 4.8 rebounds per game as the Grizzlies went to the 2011 College Basketball Invitational. As a sophomore in 2011–12, Jamar became one of the top players in the Big Sky Conference. He increased his output to 13.6 points, 5.6 rebounds and 3.8 assists per game. Jamar made the all conference team and led the Grizzlies to the NCAA Tournament.

In his junior season, Jamar led the Grizzlies to 25 wins and a second straight NCAA Tournament appearance. He averaged 14.2 points, 5.9 rebounds and 4 assists per game. At the close of the season, he was named Big Sky Player of the Year and an Associated Press honorable mention All-American.

== Professional career ==
On September 13, 2014, Jamar started his professional career with the Greek team Kolossos Rodou.

On August 31, 2015, Jamar signed with the Cypriot team Omonia Nicosia for the 2015–16 season. In 20 games played for Omonia, he averaged 13.4 points, 5.8 rebounds, 3.4 assists and 1.2 steals per game.

On August 29, 2016, Jamar signed a one-year deal with the Kapfenberg Bulls of the Austrian Basketball Bundesliga. On January 15, 2017, Jamar recorded a career-high 32 points, shooting 10-of-14 from the field, along with five rebounds, three assists and two steals in a 98–55 blowout win over UBSC Graz. On July 1, 2017, Jamar signed a one-year contract extension with the Bulls. Jamar won Austrian League and the Austrian Cup titles with the Bulls for two consecutive years.

On July 27, 2018, Jamar signed a one-year deal with Elitzur Yavne of the Israeli National League. In 29 games played for Yavne, he averaged 16.8 points, 5.7 rebounds, 3.4 assists and 1.6 steals per game.

On September 27, 2019, Jamar signed with Kharkivski Sokoly of the Ukrainian SuperLeague. He averaged 15.6 points, 5.1 rebounds, and 3.6 assists per game during the 2020–21 season. On June 28, 2021, Jamar rejoined the Kapfenberg Bulls in Austria.
