= Oleksandr Tishchenko =

Ukrainian basketball player

No. 17 – Kharkivski Sokoly
- Position: Power forward
- League: Ukrainian Superleague

Personal information
- Born: March 25, 1989 (age 37) Kyiv, Ukraine
- Listed height: 6 ft 9 in (2.06 m)
- Listed weight: 243 lb (110 kg)

Career information
- NBA draft: 2011: undrafted
- Playing career: 2007–present

Career history
- 2007–2013: Kyiv
- 2013–2016: Budivelnyk
- 2016–2017: Sukhumi
- 2017–2019: Odesa
- 2018–2019: Grodno-93
- 2019: Kyiv-Basket
- 2019–present: Kharkivski Sokoly

Career highlights
- 2× Ukrainian Basketball SuperLeague champion (2013/2014, 2014/2015)

Oleksandr Tishchenko (born March 25, 1989) is a Ukrainian professional basketball player for Kharkivski Sokoly in the Ukrainian Basketball Superleague.

== Club career ==
In October 2019, Tishchenko signed with Kharkivski Sokoly of the Ukrainian Basketball Superleague.
