= Igor Boyarkin =

Ukrainian basketball player

Free agent
- Position: Point guard

Personal information
- Born: June 13, 1995 (age 31) Druzhkivka, Ukraine
- Listed height: 5 ft 11 in (1.80 m)
- Listed weight: 187 lb (85 kg)

Career information
- NBA draft: 2018: undrafted
- Playing career: 2013–present

Career history
- 2013–2014: Donetsk
- 2014–2015: Goverla
- 2015–2017: Kryvbasbasket-Lux
- 2017–2019: Cherkaski Mavpy
- 2019-2021: Kharkivski Sokoly
- 2021-2022: BC Ternopil
- 2022-2024: Kanazawa Samuraiz
- 2023: → Alvark Tokyo

Career highlights
- Ukrainian Basketball SuperLeague champion (2017/2018)

Igor Boyarkin (Ukrainian: Ігор Бояркін; born June 13, 1995) is a Ukrainian professional basketball player for the Kanazawa Samuraiz. He represents the Ukrainian national basketball team.

== Professional career ==
Born in Druzhkivka, Boyarkin began his basketball career in the Ukrainian Basketball SuperLeague, with the BC Donetsk from 2013 to 2014.

In September 2019, he signed with the Kharkivski Sokoly for the 2019–2020 season.

On August 20, 2022, Boyarkin signed with Kanazawa Samuraiz of Japanese B.League. On January 19, 2023, Boyarkin signed loan deal with Alvark Tokyo.

== National team career ==
Boyarkin was a member of the Ukrainian national basketball team at the 2019 FIBA Basketball World Cup qualification.
