= Andrii Shapovalov =

Ukrainian basketball player

No. 17 – SC Kryvbas
- Position: Point guard
- League: Ukrainian Higher League

Personal information
- Born: November 10, 1993 (age 33) Kharkiv, Ukraine
- Listed height: 6 ft 2 in (1.88 m)
- Listed weight: 195 lb (88 kg)

Career information
- NBA draft: 2015: undrafted
- Playing career: 2015–present

Career history
- 2017–2018: Kharkivski Sokoly
- 2018–2019: Sokół Ostrów Mazowiecka
- 2019–2020: Kharkivski Sokoly
- 2020–present: SC Kryvbas

Andrii Shapovalov (born November 10, 1993) is a Ukrainian professional basketball player for Kharkivski Sokoly in the Ukrainian Basketball Superleague.

== Club career ==
In season 2018/2019 playing for Sokół Ostrów Mazowiecka he was named one of the best players in the second division of Poland championship.

In September 2019, Shapovalov returned to Kharkivski Sokoly.
