= Vladyslav Fisun =

Ukrainian journalist, club DJ, music radio show host, producer and fixer

Vlad Fisun
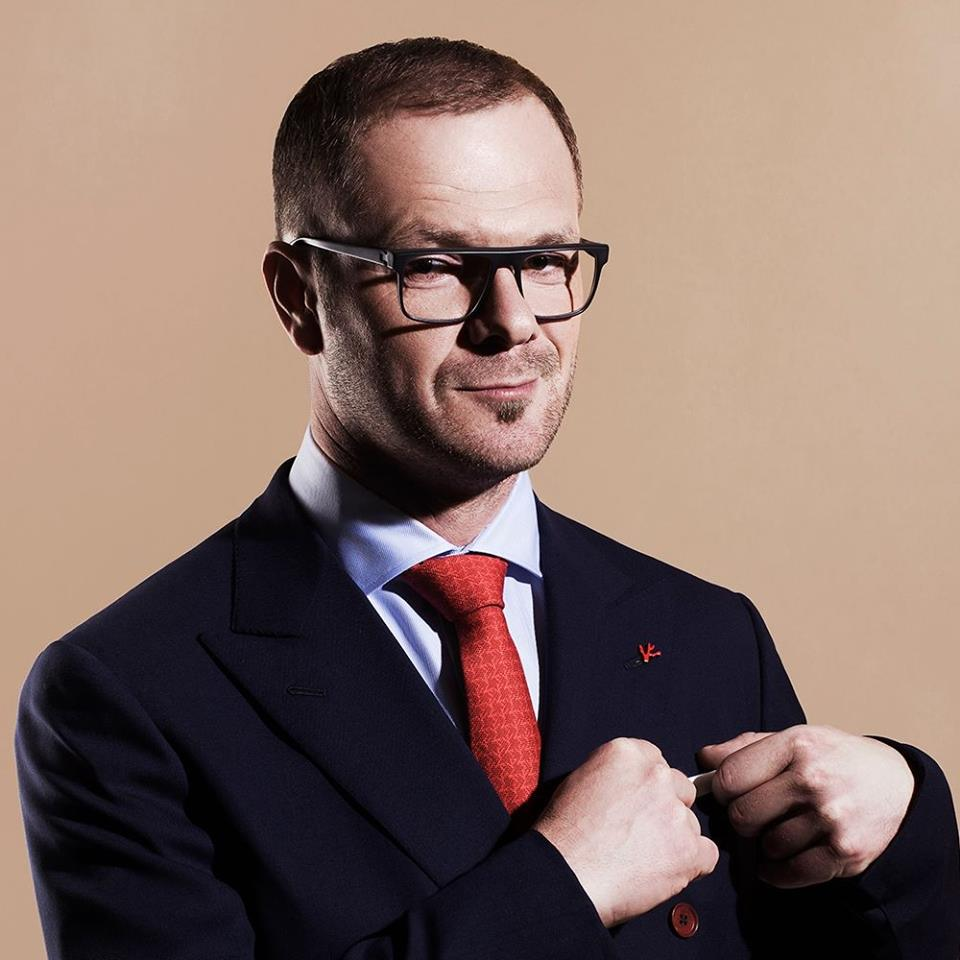
- Vladyslav Fisun
- Born: Владислав Фісун (Vladyslav Fisun); 7 June 1974 (age 51); Kharkiv, Kharkiv Oblast, Soviet Ukraine
- Other names: Fun2mass
- Occupations: DJ, music producer, radio show host, journalist

Vladyslav Fisun (Владислав Фісун, Kharkiv, Ukraine, 7 June 1974), better known as Vlad Fisun (also Влад Фісун), is a Ukrainian journalist who worked as the editor-in-chief of the magazines Playboy Ukraine, Viva!, and Афіша (Afisha) and BBC assistant producer.

Also Vlad Fisun is well known as a club and radio DJ, music show host, producer, and DJ agent (founder of DJBuro agency).

== Biography and work ==
Vlad Fisun began his media career in the 2000s with Afisha magazine, a prominent city guide, eventually becoming its editor-in-chief. In 2004, he launched Viva! Ukraine magazine, and in 2005, he took on the role of editor-in-chief at Playboy Ukraine. By 2010, Vlad transitioned to creative marketing, working as a music supervisor for the Pepsi Stars of Now! competition and later as the host and creative director of the Atlas Weekend festival.

In 2014, Vlad joined Aristocrats.fm, a digital broadcasting platform, as a host and producer. Between 2014 and 2022, he hosted several regular shows, including Big Fisun, Festive Life, and 33/45. He also produced special DJ streams and projects for brands such as Dell CIS, Borjomi, Silpo, and Eastpak.

Vlad Fisun has hosted the radio music shows "Big Fisun" (2016–2018), "Festive Life" and "33/45" on Radio Aristocrats (Радіо Аристократи, Kyiv, Ukraine). He is a regular jury member of the Aprize Music Awards.

In 2015 Vlad Fisun was the first Ukrainian to perform at the Sziget Festival in Budapest (2015). He has performed alongside many well-known artists, such as De Phazz's Karl Frierson at the 2015 Koktebel Jazz Festival held in Zatoka (Odessa Province, Ukraine).

In 2018, Vlad Fisun served as the creative director of Atlas Weekend, one of the most important music festivals in Ukraine.

In 2019, Vlad performed a DJ set in the Chernobyl exclusion zone, which UATV channel filmed. The resulting film, Chernobyl: Territory of Change (Чорнобиль. Територія змін), directed by Viktor Cherevko and others, was nominated for the special jury prize at the Asian Broadcasting Union Awards. That same year, he helped organize the Kurenevka Precompression event and DJed at the first Ukrainian Kurenevka Camp at the Burning Man festival in Nevada.

Vlad Fisun has also been active in contributing to the war effort during Russia's full-scale invasion of Ukraine. He volunteered with the Dobrovoz NGO (2022–2023), assisting with the transportation of medicine, and has participated in various fundraising initiatives to support Ukrainian defenders.

In 2024, Vlad Fisun co-founded the non-profit initiative EnterDJ, which leverages DJing as a form of art therapy and psychosocial rehabilitation. The organization's mission is to offer creative engagement and therapeutic workshops primarily for Ukrainian veterans and others experiencing trauma from the full-scale invasion. As a co-founder, Fisun has been instrumental in the development and content as well as strategic development and public presentation of the program, which works in collaboration with medical and cultural partners to restore participants' mental health and social skills.

== See also ==
- Disc jockey
- Music of Ukraine
