= Brandon Boggs (basketball) =

American basketball player (born 1992)

Club Social y Deportivo Urupan
- Position: Small forward
- League: Liga Uruguaya de Básquetbol

Personal information
- Born: May 2, 1992 (age 34) Greenville, South Carolina, U.S.
- Listed height: 6 ft 5 in (1.96 m)
- Listed weight: 190 lb (86 kg)

Career information
- High school: J.L. Mann High School (Greenville, South Carolina)
- College: Western Carolina (2010–2014)
- NBA draft: 2014: undrafted
- Playing career: 2015–present

Career history
- 2015–2016: Kongsberg Miners
- 2016–2018: Bristol Flyers
- 2018–2019: BK NH Ostrava
- 2019–2020: Kobrat
- 2020–2021: Kharkivski Sokoly
- 2021–present: Club Social y Deportivo Urupan

Brandon Boggs (born May 2, 1992) is an American professional basketball player for Club Social y Deportivo Urupan of the Liga Uruguaya de Básquetbol.

== Early life ==
Boggs was born in Greenville, South Carolina.

== Professional career ==
During the 2015–16 season, Boggs played for the Kongsberg Miners and averaged 20.5 points and 6.6 rebounds per game. In 2016, he signed with the Bristol Flyers and played two seasons with the team. In August 2020, Boggs signed with Kharkivski Sokoly of the Ukrainian Basketball Superleague. He averaged 10 points, 2.9 rebounds and 1.7 assists per game. On September 15, 2021, Boggs signed with Club Social y Deportivo Urupan of the Liga Uruguaya de Básquetbol.
