= Roman Kozlov (basketball) =

Ukrainian basketball player

Kharkivski Sokoly
- Position: Shooting guard
- League: Ukrainian Superleague

Personal information
- Born: November 13, 1990 (age 36) Kharkiv, Ukraine
- Listed height: 6 ft 4 in (1.93 m)
- Listed weight: 181 lb (82 kg)

Career information
- NBA draft: 2012: undrafted
- Playing career: 2012–present

Career history
- 2012–2019: BC Politekhnik
- 2019–2020: Kharkivski Sokoly
- 2020–2022: BC Budivelnyk
- 2022–present: Kharkivski Sokoly

Roman Kozlov (born November 13, 1989) is a Ukrainian professional basketball player for Kharkivski Sokoly in the Ukrainian Basketball Superleague.

== Early life ==
Kozlov was born in Kharkiv, Ukraine.

== Club career ==
In August 2019, Kozlov signed with Kharkivski Sokoly of the Ukrainian Basketball Superleague. He averaged 8.2 points and 1.1 assists per game. On October 8, 2020, Kozlov signed with BC Budivelnyk. On February 16, 2022, Kozlov returned to Kharkivski Sokoly.
