= Henry Logan (basketball) =

American basketball player (1946–2023)

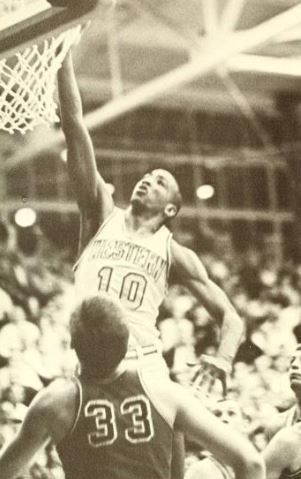
- Logan in his junior season at Western Carolina, 1967

Personal information
- Born: March 14, 1946 Asheville, North Carolina, U.S.
- Died: July 26, 2023 (aged 77)
- Listed height: 6 ft 0 in (1.83 m)
- Listed weight: 180 lb (82 kg)

Career information
- High school: Stephens-Lee (Asheville, North Carolina)
- College: Western Carolina (1964–1968)
- NBA draft: 1968: 4th round, 38th overall pick
- Drafted by: Seattle SuperSonics
- Position: Shooting guard / point guard
- Number: 12

Career history
- 1968–1970: Oakland Oaks / Washington Caps

Career highlights
- ABA champion (1969)
- Stats at Basketball Reference

Henry Lee Logan (March 14, 1946 – July 26, 2023) was an American basketball player. Logan was a 6-foot (183 cm) guard.

== Amateur ==
Logan played high school basketball at Stephens-Lee High School in Asheville, North Carolina.

After high school Logan became the first African-American collegiate basketball player in the history of North Carolina and perhaps at any predominantly white institution in the southeastern United States when he enrolled at and played basketball for Western Carolina University.

The Western Carolina University Board of Trustees wrote that Logan was "the first African-American basketball player to be recruited by and play for a predominantly white institution in the Southeast".

At WCU Logan scored 60 points in a game against Atlantic Christian in 1967, and he holds the record for most points in a season (1,049), a career (3,290) and highest career points average (30.7).

Logan led the nation in scoring for the 1967–68 season, when he averaged 36.2 points a game.

Logan helped the United States take the gold medal in the 1967 Pan American Games.

== Professional ==
Logan was drafted in the fourth round of the 1968 NBA draft by the Seattle SuperSonics. He was also drafted by the Oakland Oaks in the 1968 ABA draft.

Logan played for the Oakland Oaks in the 1968–69 ABA season, when the Oaks won the 1969 ABA championship.

Playing in 76 games, Logan scored 947 points for an average of 12.5 points per game. He increased that to an average of 13.6 points per game during the playoffs.

During the 1969–70 season Logan played for the ABA's Washington Caps. He played in 32 games, scoring 311 points for an average of 9.7 points per game.

Despite averaging 11.6 points per game throughout his professional career, his 1969–70 season with the Washington Caps was Logan's final full professional season. He did appear in one game, briefly, for the Virginia Squires during the 1971 ABA Playoffs, scoring one point on a free throw.

In 2000, the North Carolina Sports Hall of Fame inducted Logan as member of its 37th class.

== Death ==
Henry Logan died on July 26, 2023, at the age of 77.
