= Anton Musiyenko =

Ukrainian basketball player

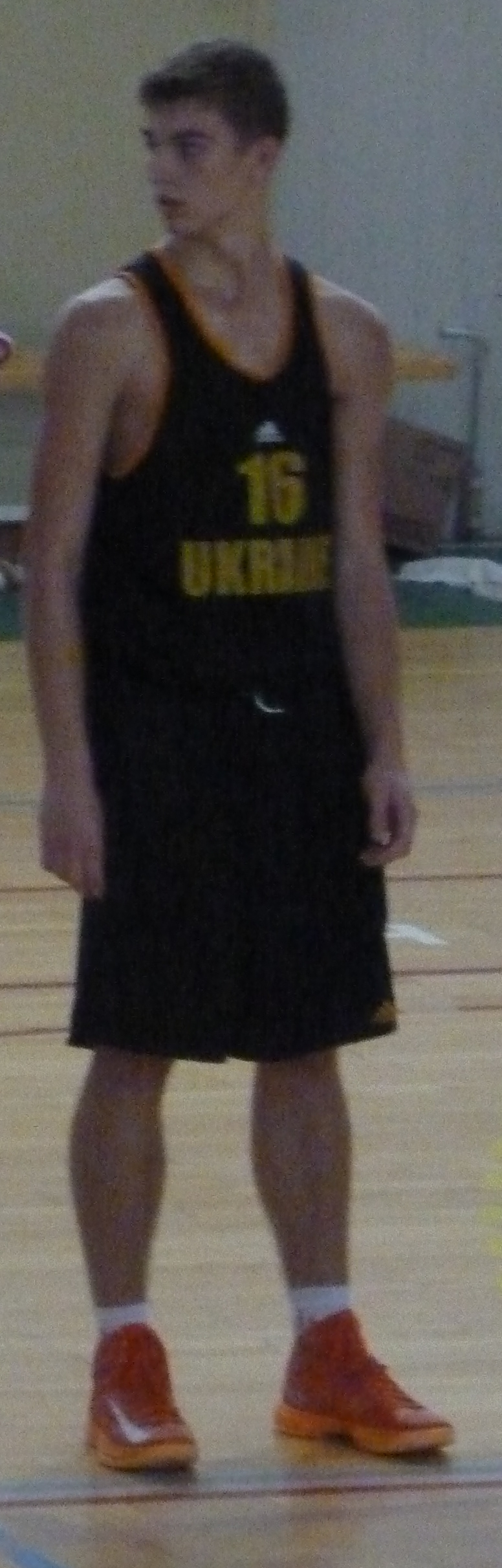
- Anton Musiyenko, 2013.

No. 12 – Kharkivski Sokoly
- Position: Shooting guard
- League: Ukrainian Superleague

Personal information
- Born: October 31, 1997 (age 29) Kharkiv, Ukraine
- Listed height: 6 ft 4 in (1.93 m)
- Listed weight: 187 lb (85 kg)

Career information
- NBA draft: 2019: undrafted
- Playing career: 2014–present

Career history
- 2014–2015: BC Kyiv
- 2015–2016: Infiz Basket Kyiv
- 2016–2019: MBC Mykolaiv
- 2019: Kyiv-Basket
- 2019–present: Kharkivski Sokoly

Anton Musiyenko (born October 31, 1997) is a Ukrainian professional basketball player for Kharkivski Sokoly in the Ukrainian Basketball Superleague.

== Early life ==
Musiyenko was born in Kharkiv, Ukraine.

== Club career ==
On 28 October 2019, Musiyenko signed with Kharkivski Sokoly of the Ukrainian Basketball Superleague.
