= Zach Jackson (basketball) =

American basketball player (born 1997)

No. 21 – BG Göttingen
- Position: Shooting guard
- League: ProA

Personal information
- Born: August 13, 1997 (age 29) Wichita, Kansas, U.S.
- Listed height: 6 ft 6 in (1.98 m)
- Listed weight: 195 lb (88 kg)

Career information
- High school: Wichita East (Wichita, Kansas)
- College: Omaha (2015–2019)
- NBA draft: 2019: undrafted
- Playing career: 2019–present

Career history
- 2019–2020: Kharkivski Sokoly
- 2020–2023: Leicester Riders
- 2023–2024: Shonan United
- 2024–2025: Leicester Riders
- 2025–present: BG Göttingen

Career highlights
- BBL Cup winner (2022); First-team All-Summit League (2019)

Zach Jackson (born August 13, 1997) is an American professional basketball player for BG Göttingen of the German ProA.

== Early life ==
Jackson was born in Wichita, Kansas.

== College career ==
As a sophomore at Omaha, Jackson averaged 10.8 points per game. Jackson averaged 17.6 points, 6.4 rebounds, and 0.9 assists per game. As a senior, Jackson averaged 18.1 points, 4.3 rebounds, 1.9 assists and 0.8 steals per game. He was named to the first-team All-Summit League and the ABC All-District 12 First Team.

== Professional career ==
In September 2019, Jackson signed with Kharkivski Sokoly of the Ukrainian Basketball Superleague. On August 19, 2020, Jackson signed with the Leicester Riders of the British Basketball League.

On July 6, 2023, Jackson signed with Shonan United of the Japanese B.League.

On August 8, 2024, Jackson returned to Leicester Riders.

On June 26, 2025, he signed with BG Göttingen of the German ProA.

== Career statistics ==
Season	Team	League	GP	GS	MPG	FG%	3P%	FT%	RPG	APG	SPG	BPG	PPG
2019–20	Kharkivski Sokoly	Superleague	8	5	31.4	.488	.296	.750	5.6	1.75	0.62	0.12	14.50
