= Block (basketball) =

Defensive action preventing a score

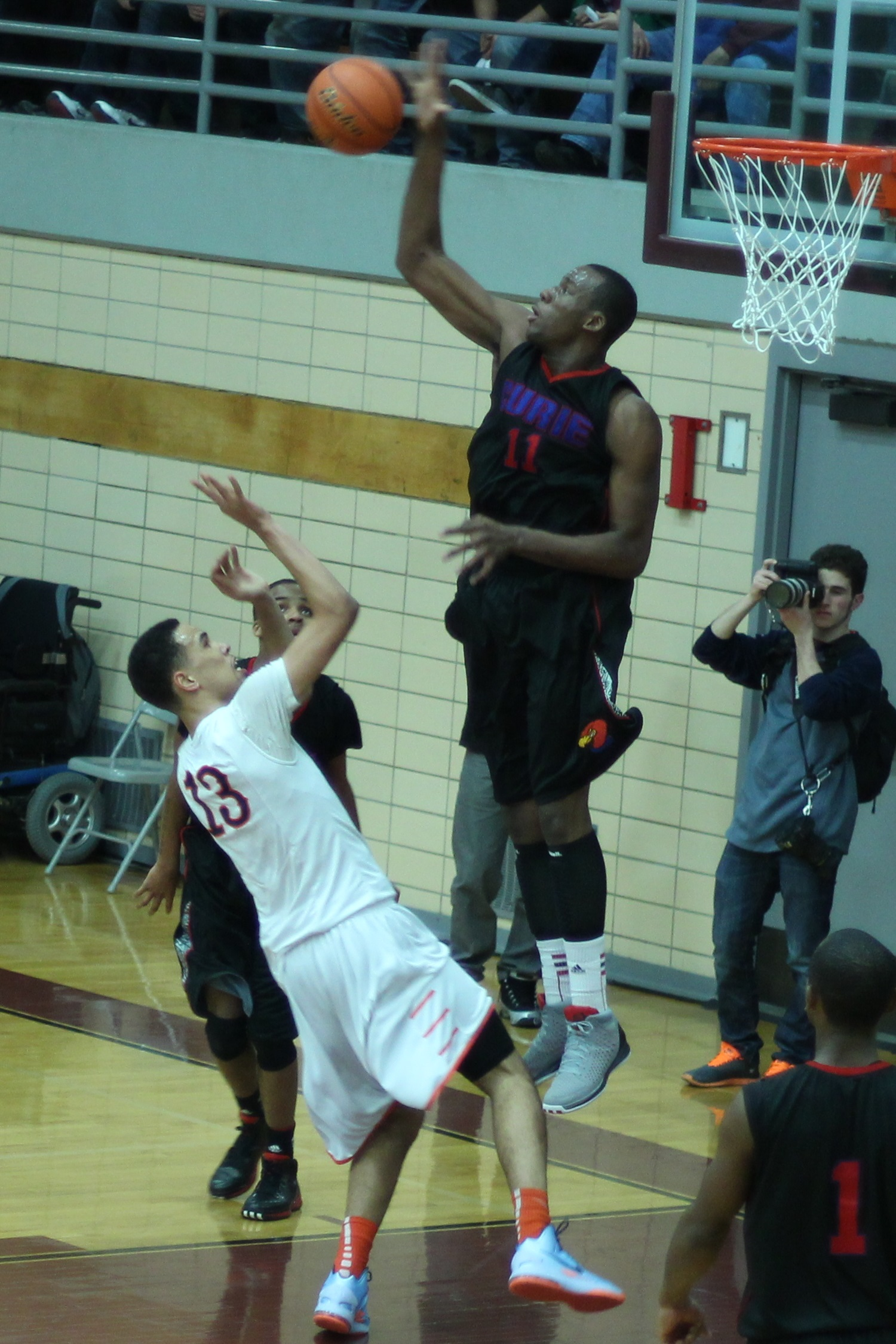
Cliff Alexander blocks a shot during the 2013 IHSA playoffs.

In basketball, a block or blocked shot occurs when a defensive player legally deflects a field goal attempt from an offensive player to prevent a score. The defender is not allowed to make contact with the offensive player's hand (unless the defender is also in contact with the ball) or a foul is called. In order to be legal, the block must occur while the shot is traveling upward or at its apex. A deflected field goal that is made does not count as a blocked shot and simply counts as a successful field goal attempt for shooter plus the points awarded to the shooting team. For the shooter, a blocked shot is counted as a missed field goal attempt. Also, on a shooting foul, a blocked shot cannot be awarded or counted, even if the player who deflected the field goal attempt is different from the player who committed the foul. If the ball is heading downward when the defender hits it, it is ruled as goaltending and counts as a made basket. Goaltending is also called if the block is made after the ball bounces on the backboard (NFHS excepted; the NCAA also used this rule until the 2009–10 season).

Nicknames for blocked shots include "rejections", "stuffs", "bushed", "spoinked", "fudged", or "double-fudged" (two-handed blocks), "facials", "swats", "denials", and "packs". Blocked shots were first officially recorded in the NBA during the 1973–74 season.

Largely due to their height and position near the basket, centers and power forwards tend to record the most blocks, but shorter players with good jumping ability can also be blockers, an example being Dwyane Wade, the shortest player, at 6'4", to record 100 blocked shots in a single season. A player with the ability to block shots can be a positive asset to a team's defense, as they can make it difficult for opposing players to shoot near the basket and, if the blocked shot is kept in play rather than swatted out of bounds, a blocked shot can lead to a fast break, a skill Bill Russell was notable for. To be a good shot-blocker, a player needs great court sense and timing, and good height or jumping ability. One tactic is that a shot-blocker can intimidate opponents to alter their shots, resulting in a miss.

== Chase-down block ==
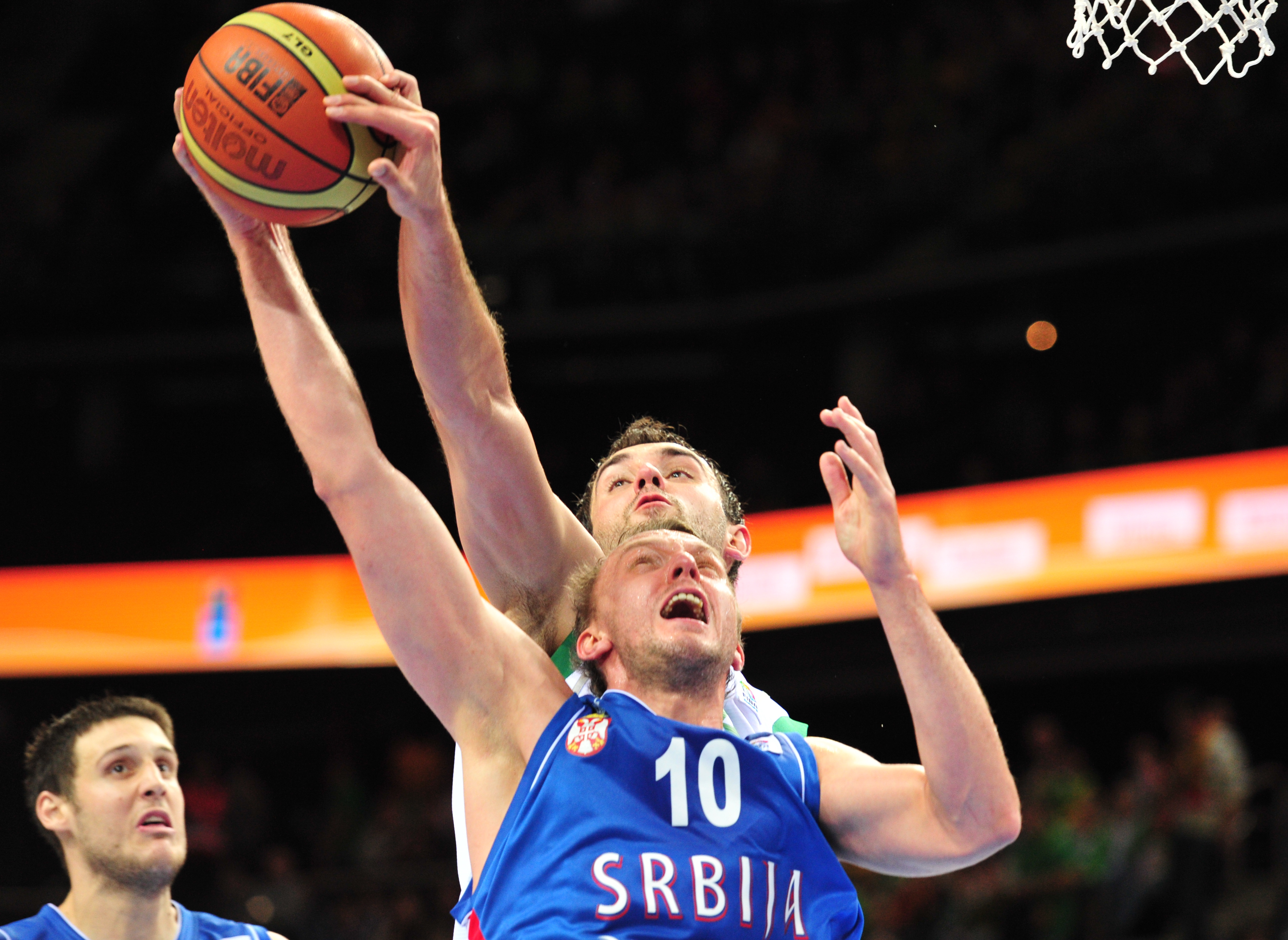
Mirza Begić blocks Duško Savanović at EuroBasket 2011.

A chase-down block occurs when a player pursues an opposing player who had run ahead of the defense (as in a fast break), and then blocks their shot attempt. Often, the block involves hitting the ball into the backboard as the opponent tries to complete a lay-up. One of the most recognized chase-down blocks is Detroit Pistons' Tayshaun Prince's game-saving block on Reggie Miller in Game 2 of the 2004 NBA Eastern Conference Finals against the Indiana Pacers. Pistons announcer Fred McLeod, who first witnessed this style of blocks from Prince, created the chase-down term later with the Cleveland Cavaliers. During the 2008–09 NBA season, the Cavaliers began tracking chase-down blocks, crediting LeBron James with 23 that season and 20 the following season. Another landmark chase-down block occurred in the 2016 NBA Finals when LeBron James, in the closing minutes of the 4th quarter delivered what became known as "The Block" on a lay-up attempt by Andre Iguodala with the score tied at 89 and 01:50 remaining in the game.

== Shot-blocking records in the NBA ==
- Most blocks in a single game: Elmore Smith (17)
- Most blocks in a single half: Elmore Smith, George T. Johnson, Manute Bol (11 each)
- Most blocks per game in a season: Mark Eaton (5.56)
- Most career blocks: Hakeem Olajuwon (3,830)
- Most blocks per game in a career: Mark Eaton (3.50)
- Most blocks in NBA Finals game: Dwight Howard (9)
- Most blocks in a non-NBA Finals playoff game: Victor Wembanyama (12)

== Shot-blocking records in NCAA Division I ==
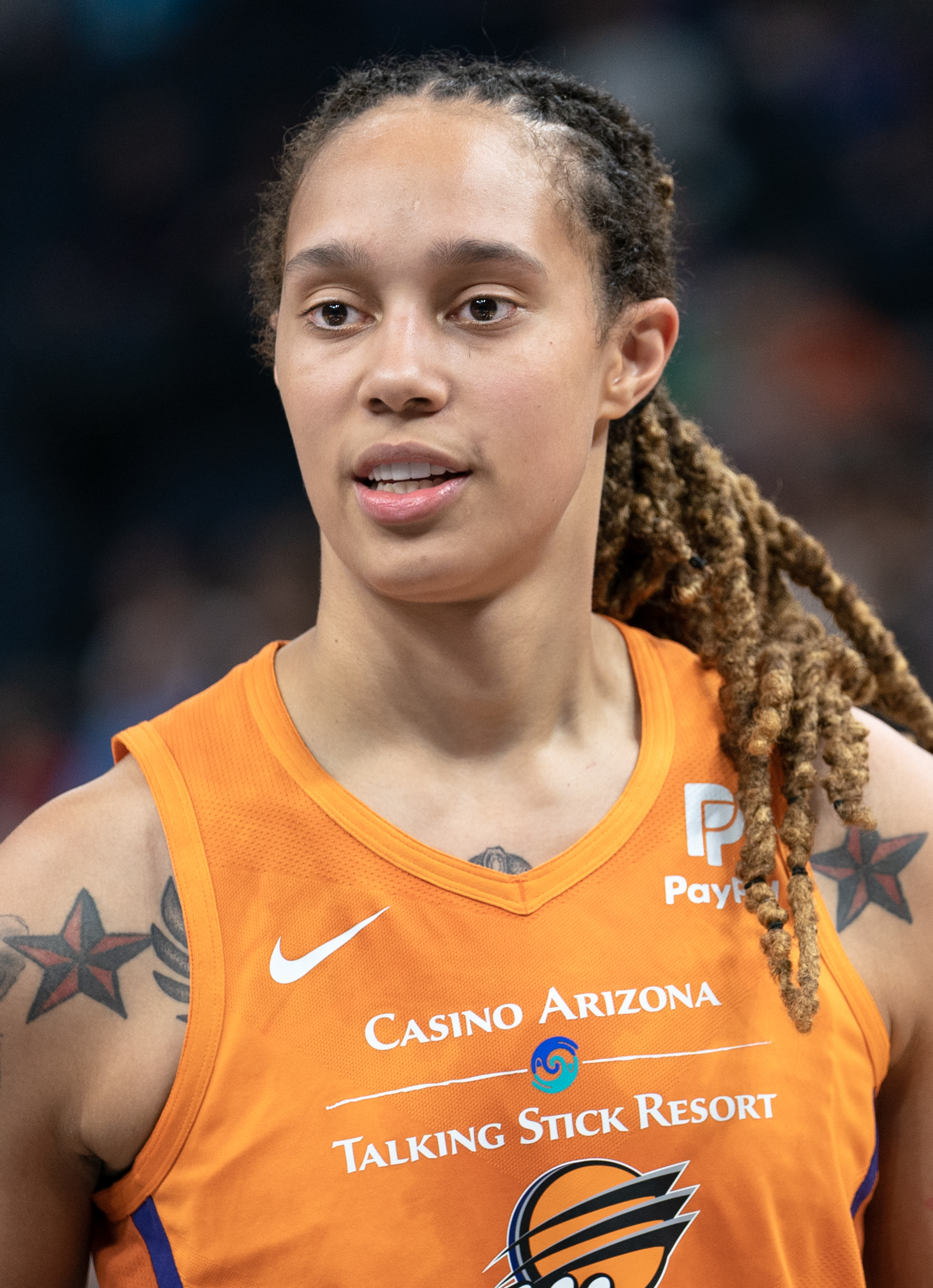
Brittney Griner

=== Men ===
- Most career blocks: Jarvis Varnado – Mississippi State (564) (2006–10)
- Most blocks single season, player: David Robinson – Navy (207) (1985–86)
- Most blocks per game single season, player: Shawn James – Northeastern (6.53) (2005–06)
- Most blocks single season, team: Kentucky (344) (2011–12)

=== Women ===
- Most career blocks: Brittney Griner – Baylor (736) (2009–13)
- Most blocks single season, player: Brittney Griner – Baylor (223) (2009–10)
- Most blocks per game single season, player: Brittney Griner – Baylor (6.4) (2009–10)
- Most blocks single season, team: Baylor (310) (2011–12)

== See also ==
- List of NBA regular season records
- List of WNBA regular season records
- List of National Basketball Association career blocks leaders
- List of WNBA career blocks leaders
- List of National Basketball Association season blocks leaders
- List of WNBA annual blocks leaders
- List of National Basketball Association players with most blocks in a game
- List of NCAA Division I men's basketball career blocks leaders
- List of NCAA Division I men's basketball season blocks leaders
- List of NCAA Division I men's basketball players with 13 or more blocks in a game
- List of NCAA Division I women's basketball career blocks leaders

== Footnotes ==
- ^a Brittney Griner's 736 career blocks is recognized as the all-time NCAA record, women's or men's. Hall of Famer Anne Donovan, who played for Old Dominion from 1979 to 1983, recorded 801 blocks while playing in the AIAW; therefore, her total is not recognized as an NCAA achievement.
