= 2011–12 Charleston Cougars men's basketball team =

American college basketball season

2011–12 Charleston Cougars men's basketball
- Conference: Southern Conference
- Record: 19–12 (10–8 SoCon)
- Head coach: Bobby Cremins
- Assistant coaches: Mark Byington; Fred Dupree; Andrew Wilson
- Home arena: Carolina First Arena

2011–12 Southern Conference men's basketball standings
	Conf.				Overall
Team	W		L	PCT	W		L	PCT
North
UNC Greensboro	10	–	8	.556	13	–	19	.406
Elon	9	–	9	.500	15	–	16	.484
Samford	8	–	10	.444	11	–	19	.367
Western Carolina	8	–	10	.444	17	–	18	.486
Appalachian State	7	–	11	.389	13	–	18	.419
Chattanooga	5	–	13	.278	11	–	21	.344
South
Davidson†	16	–	2	.889	25	–	8	.758
Georgia Southern	12	–	6	.667	15	–	15	.500
Wofford	12	–	6	.667	19	–	14	.576
College of Charleston	10	–	8	.556	19	–	12	.613
Furman	8	–	10	.444	15	–	16	.484
The Citadel	3	–	15	.167	6	–	24	.200
† SoCon tournament winner As of March 15, 2012; Rankings from AP Poll

The 2011–12 College of Charleston Cougars men's basketball team represented the College of Charleston in the 2011–12 college basketball season. This was head coach Bobby Cremins's sixth season at College of Charleston. The Cougars competed in the Southern Conference and played their home games at Carolina First Arena.

Following the Cougars loss to Furman on January 26, Cremins announced a medical leave of absence to deal with an unspecified condition.

== Roster ==
#	Name	Height	Weight (lbs.)	Position	Class	Hometown	Previous team(s)
1	Adjehi Baru	6'9"	225	F/C	Fr.	Abidjan, Côte d'Ivoire	The Steward School
4	Andrew Lawrence	6'1"	185	G	Jr.	London, England	Heat Academy
5	Matt Sundberg	6'8"	210	SF	Jr.	Kennesaw, GA	Harrison HS
10	Pat Branin	6'1"	170	G	Fr.	Richmond, VA	The Steward School
14	Bart Benton	6'0"	180	G	Jr.	Monroe, GA	George Walton Academy
22	Anthony Stitt	6'1"	170	G	Fr.	Charlotte, NC	Butler HS
23	Trevonte Dixon	6'4"	190	G	Fr.	Florence, SC	Christ School (NC)
25	James Carlton	6'7"	210	F	So.	Winterville, NC	South Central HS
30	Antwaine Wiggins	6'7"	185	F	Sr.	Greeneville, TN	Greeneville HS
31	Josh Hall	6'5"	205	F	So.	Florence, SC	Wilson HS
32	Jordan Scott	6'1"	190	G	So.	Darlington, SC	Darlington HS
44	Trent Wiedeman	6'8"	240	F	So.	Suwanee, GA	Greater Atlanta Christian
53	Willis Hall	6'6"	235	F	Jr.	Charlotte, NC	Charlotte Christian School

== Schedule and results ==
Date time, TV	Rank^{#}	Opponent^{#}	Result	Record	Site (attendance) city, state
Exhibition
October 29, 2011*; 4:00 pm		Queens	W 89–65		TD Arena (2,007); Charleston, SC
November 5, 2011*; 6:00 pm		Limestone	W 95–61		TD Arena (1,1878); Charleston, SC
Regular season
November 11, 2011*; 7:30 pm		Holy Cross	W 78–69	1–0	TD Arena (4,963); Charleston, SC
November 15, 2011*; 8:00 am, ESPN		Morehead State; College Hoops Tip Off Marathon	W 72–57	2–0	TD Arena (3,244); Charleston, SC
November 19, 2011*; 7:00 pm, ESPN3		at Clemson	W 72–69	3–0	Littlejohn Coliseum (6,325); Clemson, SC
November 24, 2011*; 2:00 pm, Versus		vs. UCF; Battle 4 Atlantis	L 63–74	3–1	Imperial Arena (N/A); Paradise Island, Nassau, Bahamas
November 25, 2011*; 7:00 pm, HDNet		vs. UNC Asheville; Battle 4 Atlantis	W 68–66	4–1	Imperial Arena (N/A); Paradise Island, Nassau, Bahamas
November 26, 2011*; 7:00 pm, HDNet		vs. UMass; Battle 4 Atlantis 5th Place Game	W 85–61	5–1	Imperial Arena (N/A); Paradise Island, Nassau, Bahamas
December 1, 2011; 8:00 pm, ESPN3		The Citadel	W 83–64	6–1 (1–0)	TD Arena (5,101); Charleston, SC
December 3, 2011; 4:00 pm, ESPN3		Chattanooga	W 87–85 ^{2OT}	7–1 (2–0)	TD Arena (4,358); Charleston, SC
December 14, 2011*; 9:00 pm, ESPN2		Tennessee	W 71–65	8–1	TD Arena (5,137); Charleston, SC
December 17, 2011*; 6:00 pm		Charleston Southern	W 70–68	9–1	TD Arena (3,768); Charleston, SC
December 20, 2011*; 9:00 pm, ESPNU		at No. 5 Louisville	L 62–69	9–2	KFC Yum! Center (20,752); Louisville, KY
December 22, 2011*; 7:00 pm		at Coastal Carolina	W 77–70	10–2	Kimbel Arena (1,049); Conway, SC
December 30, 2011*; 7:00 pm		George Mason	L 76–84	10–3	TD Arena (5,008); Charleston, SC
January 5, 2012; 8:00 pm		at Wofford	L 58–75	10–4 (2–1)	Benjamin Johnson Arena (2,387); Spartanburg, SC
January 7, 2012; 2:30 pm		at Furman	W 66–43	11–4 (3–1)	Timmons Arena (2,101); Greenville, SC
January 12, 2012; 8:00 pm		UNC Greensboro	L 66–73	11–5 (3–2)	TD Arena (4,137); Charleston, SC
January 14, 2012; 7:00 pm		Elon	W 63–44	12–5 (4–2)	TD Arena (4,022); Charleston, SC
January 19, 2012; 7:00 pm		at Davidson	L 69–87	12–6 (4–3)	John M. Belk Arena (4,127); Davidson, NC
January 21, 2012; 7:30 pm		at Georgia Southern	L 58–64	12–7 (4–4)	Hanner Fieldhouse (3,025); Statesboro, GA
January 26, 2012; 8:00 pm, ESPN3		Furman	L 63–69	12–8 (4–5)	TD Arena (4,011); Charleston, SC
January 28, 2012; 3:00 pm		Wofford	L 59–68	12–9 (4–6)	TD Arena (4,151); Charleston, SC
January 30, 2012; 8:00 pm		at Samford	W 68–52	13–9 (5–6)	Pete Hanna Center (1,052); Birmingham, AL
February 2, 2012; 7:00 pm		at Elon	L 98–99 ^{2OT}	13–10 (5–7)	Alumni Gym (Elon University) (1,157); Elon, NC
February 4, 2012; 2:00 pm		at Appalachian State	W 74–62	14–10 (6–7)	Holmes Center (2,533); Boone, NC
February 9, 2012; 8:00		Western Carolina	W 62–58	15–10 (7–7)	TD Arena (3,637); Charleston, SC
February 11, 2012; 3:00 pm		Davidson; Homecoming	W 86–78	16–10 (8–7)	TD Arena (5,112); Charleston, SC
February 15, 2012; 7:00 pm		at UNC Greensboro	L 63–78	16–11 (8–8)	Greensboro Coliseum (2,894); Greensboro, NC
February 18, 2012*; 6:00 pm, STO		at Kent State; ESPN BracketBusters	W 80–73	17–11	M.A.C. Center (3,682); Kent, OH
February 23, 2012; 8:00 pm		Georgia Southern	W 58–53	18–11 (9–8)	TD Arena (3,847); Charleston, SC
February 25, 2012; 3:00 pm		at The Citadel	W 55–47	19–11 (10–8)	McAlister Field House (4,166); Charleston, SC
Southern Conference tournament
March 2, 2012; 11:30 am		vs. Appalachian State; First Round	L 81–93	19–12	U.S. Cellular Arena (5,254); Asheville, NC
*Non-conference game. ^{#}Rankings from AP Poll. (#) Tournament seedings in parentheses.
