= 2011–12 Furman Paladins men's basketball team =

American college basketball season

2011–12 Furman Paladins men's basketball
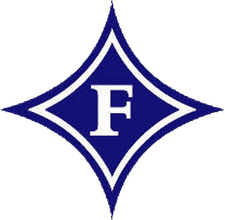
- Conference: Southern Conference
- South
- Record: 15–16 (8-10 SoCon)
- Head coach: Jeff Jackson
- Assistant coaches: Brian Thornton; David Willson; Bob Richey
- Home arena: Timmons Arena

2011–12 Southern Conference men's basketball standings
	Conf.				Overall
Team	W		L	PCT	W		L	PCT
North
UNC Greensboro	10	–	8	.556	13	–	19	.406
Elon	9	–	9	.500	15	–	16	.484
Samford	8	–	10	.444	11	–	19	.367
Western Carolina	8	–	10	.444	17	–	18	.486
Appalachian State	7	–	11	.389	13	–	18	.419
Chattanooga	5	–	13	.278	11	–	21	.344
South
Davidson†	16	–	2	.889	25	–	8	.758
Georgia Southern	12	–	6	.667	15	–	15	.500
Wofford	12	–	6	.667	19	–	14	.576
College of Charleston	10	–	8	.556	19	–	12	.613
Furman	8	–	10	.444	15	–	16	.484
The Citadel	3	–	15	.167	6	–	24	.200
† SoCon tournament winner As of March 15, 2012; Rankings from AP Poll

The 2011–12 Furman Paladins men's basketball team represented Furman University during the 2011–12 NCAA Division I men's basketball season. The Paladins, led by 6th year head coach Jeff Jackson, played their home games at Timmons Arena and were members of the Southern Conference's South Division.

== Previous season ==
The Paladins finished the 2010–11 season 22–11, 12–6 in SoCon play and lost in the first round of the CIT tournament to East Tennessee State.

== Roster ==
Number	Name	Position	Height	Weight	Year	Hometown
0	Tyler Bisack	G	6–3	185	Fr.	Fairfield, CT
3	Richard Brown	G	5–11	170	So.	Charlotte, NC
4	Tyler Hunt	F	6–7	232	Fr.	Oswego, NY
5	Aaron O'Neill	G	6–0	180	Fr.	Cincinnati, OH
10	Jordan Loyd	G	6–3	190	Fr.	Atlanta, GA
11	David Brown	G	5–10	170	Fr.	Mauldin, SC
12	Charlie Reddick	G	6–5	185	So.	Powder Springs, GA
15	Bryant Irwin	F	6–7	220	Jr.	Bridgeport, WV
20	Graham Rogers	G	5–11	170	So.	Greer, SC
22	Bobby Austin	G	6–3	200	Sr.	Cincinnati, OH
24	Brandon Sebirumbi	F	6–9	230	Sr.	Keller, TX
31	Keith Belfield	G-F	6–6	205	Fr.	Charlotte, NC
32	Bryson Barnes	F	6–6	205	Sr.	Atlanta, GA
35	Dominic Early	G-F	6–5	185	Fr.	Atlanta, GA
43	Colin Reddick	F	6–9	240	Jr.	Powder Springs, GA
44	Chris Toler	F	6–9	235	Sr.	Indianapolis, IN

== Schedule ==
Date time, TV	Rank^{#}	Opponent^{#}	Result	Record	Site (attendance) city, state
Regular Season
November 11, 2011*; 7:30 pm		Roanoke	W 75–49	1–0	Timmons Arena (1,207); Greenville, SC
November 14, 2011*; 7:00 pm		at Columbia	W 62–58	2–0	Levien Gymnasium (719); New York, NY
November 17, 2011*; 7:00 pm		at Mercer	L 44–66	2–1	Timmons Arena (1,269); Greenville, SC
November 20, 2011*; 2:00 pm		Loyola (Chicago)	W 63–51	3–1	Timmons Arena (903); Greenville, SC
November 25, 2011*; 7:00 pm		at Clemson	L 49–59	3–2	Littlejohn Coliseum (7,126); Clemson, SC
November 30, 2011; 7:00 pm		at Elon	L 70–77	3–3 (0–1)	Alumni Gym (Elon University) (958); Elon, NC
December 3, 2011; 7:00 pm		at Davidson	L 65–86	3–4 (0–2)	John M. Belk Arena (3,573); Davidson, NC
December 6, 2011*; 7:00 pm		UVa-Wise	W 86–66	4–4	Timmons Arena (826); Greenville, SC
December 11, 2011*; 4:00 pm		Jacksonville	W 85–79	5–4	Timmons Arena (1,019); Greenville, SC
December 17, 2011*; 8:00 pm		at WKU	W 76–63	6–4	E.A. Diddle Arena (3,192); Bowling Green, KY
December 20, 2011*; 7:00 pm		at Presbyterian	L 71–75	6–5	Templeton Center (801); Clinton, SC
December 23, 2011*; 7:00 pm		at Georgia	L 50–64	6–6	Stegeman Coliseum (5,410); Athens, GA
December 30, 2011*; 7:00 pm		at UNC Wilmington	L 61–62	6–7	Trask Coliseum (3,264); Wilmington, NC
January 5, 2012; 7:00 pm		The Citadel	W 77–45	7–7 (1–2)	Timmons Arena (1,239); Greenville, SC
January 7, 2012; 2:30 pm		College of Charleston	L 43–66	7–8 (1–3)	Timmons Arena (2,101); Greenville, SC
January 12, 2012; 7:00 pm, ESPN3		at Appalachian State	L 50–56	7–9 (1–4)	Holmes Center (1,055); Boone, NC
January 14, 2012; 2:00 pm		at Western Carolina	W 58–55	8–9 (2–4)	Ramsey Center (2,847); Cullowhee, NC
January 19, 2012; 7:00 pm		Georgia Southern	W 64–54	9–9 (3–4)	Timmons Arena (1,432); Greenville, SC
January 21, 2012; 4:00 pm		Wofford	L 72–79	9–10 (3–5)	Timmons Arena (2,721); Greenville, SC
January 26, 2012; 7:00 pm, ESPN3		at College of Charleston	W 69–63	10–10 (4–5)	TD Arena (4,011); Charleston, SC
January 28, 2012; 7:05 pm		at The Citadel	W 67–58	11–10 (5–5)	McAlister Field House (1,602); Charleston, SC
February 1, 2012; 7:00 pm		at Davidson	L 53–71	11–11 (5–6)	Timmons Arena (2,324); Greenville, SC
February 4, 2012; 12:00 pm		UNC Greensboro	W 93–85	12–11 (6–6)	Timmons Arena (1,855); Greenville, SC
February 6, 2012; 7:30 pm		at Georgia Southern			Hanner Fieldhouse; Statesboro, GA
February 9, 2012; 7:00 pm		Appalachian State			Timmons Arena; Greenville, SC
February 11, 2012; 4:00 pm		Western Carolina			Timmons Arena; Greenville, SC
February 18, 2012; 5:00 pm		at Samford			Pete Hanna Center; Homewood, AL
February 23, 2012; 7:00 pm		Chattanooga			McKenzie Arena; Chattanooga, TN
February 25, 2012; 7:00 pm		at Wofford			Benjamin Johnson Arena; Spartanburg, SC
SoCon tournament
March 2, 2012; TBD		vs. First Round			Asheville Civic Center; Asheville, NC
*Non-conference game. ^{#}Rankings from AP Poll. (#) Tournament seedings in parentheses. All times are in Eastern Time.

"Furman Paladins Basketball 2011–12 Schedule". ESPN.
