= 2011–12 Georgia Southern Eagles men's basketball team =

American college basketball season

2011–12 Georgia Southern Eagles men's basketball
- Conference: Southern Conference
- South Division
- Record: 15–15 (12–6 SoCon)
- Head coach: Charlton Young
- Assistant coaches: Chris Capko; Steve Smith; Pershin Williams
- Home arena: Hanner Fieldhouse

2011–12 Southern Conference men's basketball standings
| | Conf. | | | | Overall |
| Team | W | | L | PCT | W | | L | PCT |
|---|---|---|---|---|---|---|---|---|
North
| UNC Greensboro | 10 | – | 8 | .556 | 13 | – | 19 | .406 |
| Elon | 9 | – | 9 | .500 | 15 | – | 16 | .484 |
| Samford | 8 | – | 10 | .444 | 11 | – | 19 | .367 |
| Western Carolina | 8 | – | 10 | .444 | 17 | – | 18 | .486 |
| Appalachian State | 7 | – | 11 | .389 | 13 | – | 18 | .419 |
| Chattanooga | 5 | – | 13 | .278 | 11 | – | 21 | .344 |
South
| Davidson† | 16 | – | 2 | .889 | 25 | – | 8 | .758 |
| Georgia Southern | 12 | – | 6 | .667 | 15 | – | 15 | .500 |
| Wofford | 12 | – | 6 | .667 | 19 | – | 14 | .576 |
| College of Charleston | 10 | – | 8 | .556 | 19 | – | 12 | .613 |
| Furman | 8 | – | 10 | .444 | 15 | – | 16 | .484 |
| The Citadel | 3 | – | 15 | .167 | 6 | – | 24 | .200 |
† SoCon tournament winner As of March 15, 2012; Rankings from AP Poll

The 2011–12 Georgia Southern Eagles men's basketball team represented Georgia Southern University during the 2011–12 NCAA Division I men's basketball season. The Eagles, led by third-year head coach Charlton Young, played their home games at Hanner Fieldhouse and were members of the South Division of the Southern Conference.

== Roster ==
| Number | Name | Position | Height | Weight | Year | Hometown |
|---|---|---|---|---|---|---|
| 0 | Ben Drayton III | Guard | 5–10 | 178 | Sr. | St. Mary's, Georgia |
| 1 | Jessie Pernell | Guard | 6–1 | 170 | Freshman | North Augusta, South Carolina |
| 2 | Sam Mike | Forward | 6–6 | 225 | Sophomore | Decatur, Georgia |
| 3 | Eric Ferguson | Guard | 6–7 | 205 | Sophomore | Statesboro, Georgia |
| 4 | Tracy Ham Jr. | Guard | 5–8 | 137 | Freshman | McDonough, Georgia |
| 5 | Jelani Hewitt | Guard | 6–2 | 185 | Sophomore | Oakland Park, Florida |
| 10 | Marvin Baynham | Forward | 6–6 | 217 | Sophomore | Miami, Florida |
| 11 | Tre Bussey | Guard | 6–2 | 172 | Sophomore | Lithia Springs, Georgia |
| 12 | Joe Goydish II | Guard | 5–10 | 177 | Freshman | Marietta, Georgia |
| 13 | Edwin Harvey | Guard | 6–2 | 200 | Freshman | Statesboro, Georgia |
| 24 | Chad Waddell | Guard | 6–1 | 190 | Freshman | Evans, Georgia |
| 25 | Colton Cape | Forward | 6–5 | 230 | Senior | Athens, Georgia |
| 26 | Tyrone Brown | Forward | 6–8 | 215 | Freshman | Millen, Georgia |
| 32 | Cameron Baskerville | Junior | 6–7 | 226 | Junior | Marietta, Georgia |
| 34 | Kameron Dunnican | Center | 6–7 | 205 | Junior | Sumter, South Carolina |
| 50 | Willie Powers III | Guard | 6–2 | 197 | Senior | Gainesville, Florida |

== Schedule ==
| Date time, TV | Rank^{#} | Opponent^{#} | Result | Record | Site (attendance) city, state |
Exhibition
| October 27, 2011*; 7:00 pm | | Voorhees | W 97–66 | | Hanner Fieldhouse (N/A); Statesboro, GA |
| November 4, 2011*; 7:00 pm | | Paine | W 97–76 | | Hanner Fieldhouse (N/A); Statesboro, GA |
Regular Season
| November 11, 2011*; 7:30 pm | | Valparaiso | L 81–90 | 0–1 | Hanner Fieldhouse (2,547); Statesboro, GA |
| November 16, 2011*; 7:00 pm | | at Wake Forest | L 72–81 | 0–2 | LJVM Coliseum (6,719); Winston-Salem, NC |
| November 18, 2011*; 7:00 pm | | Webber International | W 84–61 | 1–2 | Hanner Field House (723); Statesboro, GA |
| November 23, 2011*; 7:00 pm | | at South Florida | L 46–66 | 1–3 | St. Pete Times Forum (2,361); Tampa, FL |
| November 27, 2011*; 3:00 pm | | at SMU | L 49–55 | 1–4 | Moody Coliseum (1,492); Dallas, TX |
| December 1, 2011; 7:00 pm | | Chattanooga | W 84–76 | 2–4 (1–0) | Hanner Fieldhouse (1,476); Statesboro, GA |
| December 3, 2011; 7:30 pm | | Appalachian State | W 73–62 | 3–4 (2–0) | Hanner Fieldhouse (1,536); Statesboro, GA |
| December 10, 2011*; 7:00 pm | | at Eastern Kentucky | L 59–63 | 3–5 (2–0) | Alumni Coliseum (2,100); Richmond, KY |
| December 19, 2011*; 8:05 pm | | at South Alabama | L 57–70 | 3–6 | Mitchell Center (1,856); Mobile, AL |
| December 22, 2011*; 7:00 pm | | at Georgia State | L 52–72 | 3–7 | GSU Sports Arena (1,937); Atlanta, GA |
| December 30, 2011*; 7:00 pm | | at Auburn | L 75–78 | 3–8 | Auburn Arena (6,061); Auburn, AL |
| January 2, 2012*; 7:30 pm | | Brewton-Parker | W 88–60 | 4–8 | Hanner Fieldhouse (1,247); Statesboro, GA |
| January 5, 2012; 7:00 pm | | at Elon | W 69–63 | 5–8 (3–0) | Alumni Gym (1,310); Elon, NC |
| January 7, 2012; 12:00 pm | | at Davidson | L 74–96 | 5–9 (3–1) | John M. Belk Arena (3,395); Davidson, NC |
| January 12, 2012; 7:00 pm | | Samford | L 53–58 | 6–9 (4–1) | Hanner Fieldhouse (1,372); Statesboro, GA |
| January 14, 2012; 7:00 pm | | at Wofford | L 63–88 | 6–10 (4–2) | Benjamin Johnson Arena (1,755); Spartanburg, SC |
| January 19, 2012; 7:00 pm | | at Furman | L 54–64 | 6–11 (4–3) | Timmons Arena (1,432); Greenville, SC |
| January 21, 2012; 7:30 pm | | College of Charleston | W 64–58 | 7–11 (5–3) | Hanner Fieldhouse (3,025); Statesboro, GA |
| January 23, 2012; 7:00 pm | | The Citadel | W 78–72 ^{2OT} | 8–11 (6–3) | Hanner Fieldhouse (1,565); Statesboro, GA |
| January 26, 2012; 8:00 pm, ESPN3 | | at Samford | L 55–57 | 8–12 (6–4) | Pete Hanna Center (902); Homewood, AL |
| January 28, 2012; 7:30 pm | | at Chattanooga | W 75–72 | 9–12 (7–4) | McKenzie Arena (4,170); Chattanooga, TN |
| February 4, 2012; 2:00 pm | | at Western Carolina | W 68–65 | 10–12 (8–4) | Ramsey Center (1,607); Cullowhee, NC |
| February 6, 2012; 7:30 pm | | Furman | W 64–57 | 11–12 (9–4) | Hanner Fieldhouse (1,906); Statesboro, GA |
| February 9, 2012; 7:00 pm | | Wofford | W 63–49 | 12–12 (10–4) | Hanner Fieldhouse (2,353); Statesboro, GA |
| February 11, 2012; 7:05 pm | | at The Citadel | W 73–72 ^{OT} | 13–12 (11–4) | McAlister Field House (2,518); Charleston, SC |
| February 18, 2012; 7:30 pm | | UNC Greensboro | W 83–69 | 14–12 (12–4) | Hanner Fieldhouse (2,837); Statesboro, GA |
| February 23, 2012; 8:00 pm | | at College of Charleston | W 58–53 | 14–13 (12–5) | TD Arena (3,847); Charleston, SC |
| February 25, 2012; 7:00 pm | | Davidson | W 71–54 | 14–14 (12–6) | Hanner Fieldhouse (2,430); Statesboro, GA |
SoCon tournament
| March 2, 2012; 8:30 pm | | vs. Chattanooga; First Round | W 76–70 | 15–14 (12–6) | U.S. Cellular Center (4,741); Asheville, NC |
| March 3, 2012; 8:30 pm, ESPN3 | | vs. Elon; Quarterfinals | L 58–65 | 15–15 (12–6) | U.S. Cellular Center (5,432); Asheville, NC |
*Non-conference game. ^{#}Rankings from AP Poll. (#) Tournament seedings in parentheses. All times are in Eastern Time.

"Georgia Southern Basketball 2011–12 Schedule". ESPN.
