= 2011–12 Western Carolina Catamounts men's basketball team =

American college basketball season

2011–12 Western Carolina Catamounts men's basketball
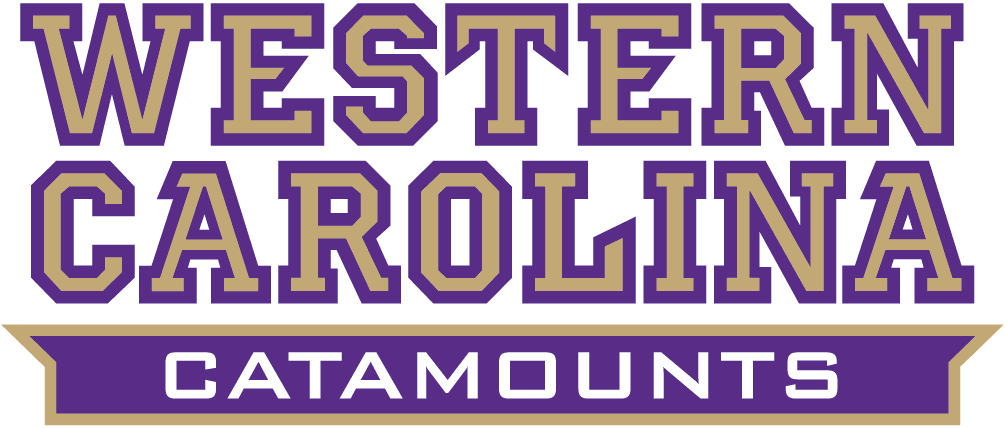
- Conference: Southern Conference
- Record: 17–17 (8–10 SoCon)
- Head coach: Larry Hunter
- Assistant coaches: Wade O'Connor; Andre Gray; Anquell McCollum
- Home arena: Ramsey Center

2011–12 Southern Conference men's basketball standings
	Conf.				Overall
Team	W		L	PCT	W		L	PCT
North
UNC Greensboro	10	–	8	.556	13	–	19	.406
Elon	9	–	9	.500	15	–	16	.484
Samford	8	–	10	.444	11	–	19	.367
Western Carolina	8	–	10	.444	17	–	18	.486
Appalachian State	7	–	11	.389	13	–	18	.419
Chattanooga	5	–	13	.278	11	–	21	.344
South
Davidson†	16	–	2	.889	25	–	8	.758
Georgia Southern	12	–	6	.667	15	–	15	.500
Wofford	12	–	6	.667	19	–	14	.576
College of Charleston	10	–	8	.556	19	–	12	.613
Furman	8	–	10	.444	15	–	16	.484
The Citadel	3	–	15	.167	6	–	24	.200
† SoCon tournament winner As of March 15, 2012; Rankings from AP Poll

The 2011–12 Western Carolina Catamounts men's basketball team represented Western Carolina University during the 2011–12 college basketball season. This was head coach Larry Hunter's seventh season at Western Carolina. The Catamounts competed in the Southern Conference and played their home games at the Ramsey Center.

== Roster ==
#	Name	Height	Weight (lbs.)	Position	Class	Hometown
0	Tom Tankelewicz	6'4"	185	F	So.	Apex, NC
1	Kenny Hall	6'7"	205	F	Fr.	Dallas, TX
4	Keaton Cole	5'10"	170	G	Sr.	Toronto, ON
5	Trey Sumler	6'2"	175	G	Jr.	Rocky Mount, NC
11	Dillon Dunford	5'11"	165	G	So.	Cullowhee, NC
14	Josh Mendenhall	6'8"	190	F	Jr.	Cullowhee, NC
22	Harouna Mutombo	6'4"	195	G	Sr.	Pickering, ON
24	Brandon Boggs	6'5"	190	G	So.	Greenville, SC
25	James Sinclair	6'2"	175	G	Fr.	Savannah, GA
32	Tawaski King	6'8'	245	F	So.	Dublin, GA
33	Ishmael Hollis	6'8"	195	F	So.	Flowery Branch, GA
40	Preston Ross	6'4"	210	G	So.	Fayetteville, NC
44	Sam Smithson	6'9"	225	C	Sr.	Horse Shoe, NC

== Schedule and results ==
Date time, TV	Rank^{#}	Opponent^{#}	Result	Record	Site (attendance) city, state
Regular season
11/11/2011*; 7:00 p.m.		at South Carolina	L 50–75	0–1	Colonial Life Arena (9,330); Columbia, SC
11/15/2011*; 7:00 p.m.		Montreat College	W 109–63	1–1	Ramsey Center (1,322); Cullowhee, NC
11/17/2011*; 7:30 p.m.		at Presbyterian	W 80–73	2–1	Templeton Physical Education Center (684); Clinton, SC
11/20/2011*; 1:30 p.m.		at Iowa State; South Padre Island Invitational	L 60–92	2–2	Hilton Coliseum (10,992); Ames, IA
11/22/2011*; 8:00 p.m.		at Northern Iowa (South Padre Island Invitational)	L 39–59	2–3	McLeod Center (3,620); Cedar Falls, IA
11/25/2011*; 3:30 p.m.		vs. Northern Colorado; South Padre Island Invitational	L 57–74	2–4	South Padre Island Convention Centre (305); South Padre Island, TX
11/26/2011*; 2:00 p.m.		vs. Florida A&M; South Padre Island Invitational	W 62–46	3–4	South Padre Island Convention Centre (125); South Padre Island, TX
12/1/2011; 8:00 p.m.		at Samford	W 75–71	4–4 (1–0)	Pete Hanna Center (821); Homewood, AL
12/3/2011; 4:30 p.m.		UNC Greensboro	W 73–69	5–4 (2–0)	Ramsey Center (1,637); Cullowhee, NC
12/7/2011*; 7:30 p.m.		at Purdue	L 60–65	5–5	Mackey Arena (13,904); West Lafayette, IN
12/10/2011*; 2:00 p.m.		Kent State	L 56–58	5–6	Ramsey Center (1,565); Cullowhee, NC
12/20/2011*; 8:00 p.m.		at Bradley	W 68–67	6–6	Carver Arena (7,147); Peoria, IL
12/28/2011*; 6:00 p.m.		UNC Asheville	L 67–86	7–6	Ramsey Center (1,511); Cullowhee, NC
12/31/2011*; 2:00 p.m.		at NC State	L 55–82	7–7	RBC Center (13,429); Raleigh, NC
1/5/2012; 7:00 p.m.		at Chattanooga	L 62–78	7–8 (2–1)	McKenzie Arena (2,554); Chattanooga, TN
1/7/2012; 4:30 p.m.		Wofford	W 67–57	8–8 (3–1)	Ramsey Center (2,257); Cullowhee, NC
1/12/2012; 7:00 p.m.		at Davidson	L 67–88	8–9 (3–2)	John M. Belk Arena (3,293); Davidson, NC
1/14/2012; 2:00 p.m.		Furman	L 55–58	8–10 (3–3)	Ramsey Center (2,847); Cullowhee, NC
1/17/2012*; 7:00 p.m.		Toccoa Falls	W 141–39	9–10 (3–3)	Ramsey Center (1,431); Cullowhee, NC
1/21/2012; 2:00 p.m.		at Appalachian State	L 72–84	9–11 (3–4)	Holmes Center (3,476); Boone, NC
1/26/2012; 7:00 p.m.		Elon	L 63–71	9–12 (3–5)	Ramsey Center (1,521); Cullowhee, NC
1/28/2012; 2:00 p.m.		at UNC Greensboro	L 86–89 ^{OT}	9–13 (3–6)	Greensboro Coliseum (3,585); Greensboro, NC
1/30/2012; 7:00 p.m.		at Wofford	L 52–86	9–14 (3–7)	Benjamin Johnson Arena (1,655); Spartanburg, SC
2/2/2012; 7:00 p.m., ESPN3		Chattanooga	W 82–76	10–14 (4–7)	Ramsey Center (2,047); Cullowhee, NC
2/4/2012; 2:00 p.m.		Georgia Southern	L 65–68	10–15 (4–8)	Ramsey Center (1,607); Cullowhee, NC
2/9/2012; 7:00 p.m., ESPN3		at College of Charleston	L 58–62	10–16 (4–9)	TD Arena (3,637); Charleston, SC
2/11/2012; 4:00 p.m.		at Furman	L 66–80	10–17 (4–10)	Timmons Arena (2,584); Greenville, SC
2/16/2012; 7:00 p.m.		The Citadel	W 70–53	11–17 (5–10)	Ramsey Center (1,872); Cullowhee, NC
2/18/2012; 7:00 p.m.		at Elon	W 78–76 ^{OT}	12–17 (6–10)	Elon (1,163); Elon, NC
2/23/2012; 7:00 p.m.		Samford	W 79–77	13–17 (7–10)	Ramsey Center (1,097); Cullowhee, NC
2/25/2012; 2:00 p.m.		Appalachian State	W 83–75	14–17 (8–10)	Ramsey Center (3,628); Cullowhee, NC
Southern Conference tournament
3/2/2012; 2:00 p.m.		vs. The Citadel; Southern Conference First Round	W 68–56	15–17	U.S. Cellular Center (5,254); Asheville, NC
3/3/2012; 2:30 p.m., ESPN3		vs. Wofford; Southern Conference Quarterfinals	W 82–59	16–17	U.S. Cellular Center (7,464); Asheville, NC
3/4/2012; 6:00 p.m., ESPN3		vs. UNC Greensboro; Southern Conference Semifinals	W 82–77	17–17	U.S. Cellular Center (6,364); Asheville, NC
3/5/2012; 9:00 p.m., ESPN2		vs. Davidson; Southern Conference Championship	L 91–93 ^{2OT}		U.S. Cellular Center; Asheville, NC
*Non-conference game. ^{#}Rankings from AP Poll. (#) Tournament seedings in parentheses. All times are in Eastern Time.
