= 2011–12 The Citadel Bulldogs basketball team =

American college basketball season

2011–12 The Citadel Bulldogs men's basketball
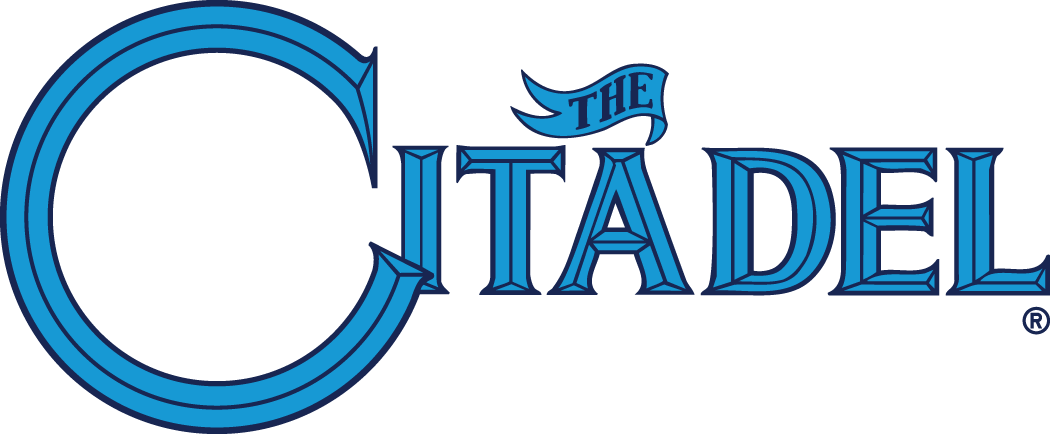
- Conference: Southern Conference
- South Division
- Record: 6–24 (3–15 SoCon)
- Head coach: Chuck Driesell
- Assistant coaches: Rob Burke; J.D. Powell; Damien Price
- Home arena: McAlister Field House

2011–12 Southern Conference men's basketball standings
	Conf.				Overall
Team	W		L	PCT	W		L	PCT
North
UNC Greensboro	10	–	8	.556	13	–	19	.406
Elon	9	–	9	.500	15	–	16	.484
Samford	8	–	10	.444	11	–	19	.367
Western Carolina	8	–	10	.444	17	–	18	.486
Appalachian State	7	–	11	.389	13	–	18	.419
Chattanooga	5	–	13	.278	11	–	21	.344
South
Davidson†	16	–	2	.889	25	–	8	.758
Georgia Southern	12	–	6	.667	15	–	15	.500
Wofford	12	–	6	.667	19	–	14	.576
College of Charleston	10	–	8	.556	19	–	12	.613
Furman	8	–	10	.444	15	–	16	.484
The Citadel	3	–	15	.167	6	–	24	.200
† SoCon tournament winner As of March 15, 2012; Rankings from AP Poll

The 2011–12 The Citadel Bulldogs basketball team represented The Citadel, The Military College of South Carolina in the 2011–12 NCAA Division I men's basketball season. The Bulldogs were led by second-year head coach Chuck Driesell and played their home games at McAlister Field House. They were a member of the South Division of the Southern Conference (SoCon). They finished the season 6–24, 3–15 in SoCon play, to finish in last place in the South Division. They lost in the first round of the SoCon Basketball tournament to Western Carolina.

== Preseason ==
Media covering the Southern Conference picked The Citadel to finish sixth in the South Division, with 48 points total out of a possible 180. Davidson, College of Charleston, Wofford, Furman and Georgia Southern were picked to finish ahead of the Bulldogs in the division.

=== Recruiting ===
College recruiting information
Name	Hometown	School	Height	Weight	Commit date
Marshall Harris; PG	San Antonio, TX	William H. Taft High School	5 ft 10 in (1.78 m)	175 lb (79 kg)	Nov 11, 2010
Marshall Harris; PG	Recruit ratings: ESPN: (80)				
Jordan Robertson; C	Greensboro, NC	Greensboro Day School	6 ft 7 in (2.01 m)	215 lb (98 kg)	Nov 11, 2010
Jordan Robertson; C	Recruit ratings: ESPN: (79)				
Michael Hundley; C	Detroit, MI	Renaissance High School	6 ft 9 in (2.06 m)	195 lb (88 kg)	Nov 11, 2010
Michael Hundley; C	Recruit ratings: ESPN: (79)				
Dylan Setzekorn; SF	Gainesville, GA	The Hun School of Princeton	6 ft 5 in (1.96 m)	180 lb (82 kg)	Nov 11, 2010
Dylan Setzekorn; SF	Recruit ratings: ESPN: (79)				
C.J. Bray; PF	Charleston, SC	James Island High School	6 ft 7 in (2.01 m)	240 lb (110 kg)	Nov 11, 2010
C.J. Bray; PF	Recruit ratings: ESPN: (79)				
Lawrence Miller; PG	Greensboro, NC	United Faith Christian Academy	6 ft 1 in (1.85 m)	175 lb (79 kg)	Nov 11, 2010
Lawrence Miller; PG	Recruit ratings: ESPN: (79)				
P.J. Horgan; PF	Rio Rancho, NM	Cleveland High School	6 ft 8 in (2.03 m)	225 lb (102 kg)	Nov 11, 2010
P.J. Horgan; PF	Recruit ratings: ESPN: (78)				
Overall recruit ranking:
Note: In many cases, Scout, Rivals, 247Sports, On3, and ESPN may conflict in their listings of height and weight.; In these cases, the average was taken. ESPN grades are on a 100-point scale.; Sources: "ESPN – Citadel Basketball Recruiting 2011". ESPN.; "2011 Team Ranking". Rivals.

== Roster ==
#	Name	Position	Height	Weight (lb)	Class	Hometown
0	Dylen Setzekorn	G-F	6'7"	180	Fr.	Gainesville, GA
1	Nathan Conley	G	6'2"	190	So.	Vienna, WV
3	Cosmo Morabbi	G	6'2"	190	Sr.	Beverly Hills, CA
10	Marshall Harris	G	6'1"	175	Fr.	San Antonio, TX
11	DeVontae Wright	G	5'11"	175	So.	Goose Creek, SC
12	Ashton Moore	G	6'0"	175	Fr.	Suffolk, VA
15	Jordan Robertson	F	6'7"	215	Fr.	Greensboro, NC
20	Barry Smith	F	6'6"	190	So.	Pittsburgh, PA
21	Michael Hundley	F	6'9"	195	Fr.	Farmington Hills, MI
23	Will Keistler	G	6'1"	215	So.	Wilmington, NC
24	Lawrence Miller	G	6'1"	175	Fr.	Charlotte, NC
25	C.J. Bray	G	6'7"	240	Fr.	Charleston, SC
31	Mike Groselle	C	6'8"	230	Jr.	Plano, TX
34	Bo Holston	G-F	6'4"	190	Sr.	Olney, MD
44	P.J. Horgan	F	6'8"	225	Fr.	Rio Rancho, NM

== Coaching staff ==
Name	Type
Chuck Driesell	Head coach
Rob Burke	Assistant coach
J.D. Powell	Assistant coach
Damien Price	Assistant coach
Kevin Hammack	Graduate assistant
Dan McNeely	Graduate manager

== Schedule ==
The 2011–12 Bulldogs opened the regular season in Colorado Springs, Colorado for the inaugural All-Military Classic, featuring Army, VMI and host Air Force. The non-conference schedule featured home tilts with in-state rivals Clemson, Coastal Carolina and Charleston Southern as well as road games at James Madison, Denver and Tennessee. The Southern Conference slate began with three straight road games and featured home and home matchups with South Division foes College of Charleston, Wofford, Furman, Davidson and Georgia Southern. Cross-divisional teams that Bulldogs faced twice were UNC Greensboro and Elon. North Division opponents Samford and Appalachian State visited McAlister Field House, while the Bulldogs traveled to Western Carolina and Chattanooga. The regular season slate closed with three straight cross-divisional games before the finale with rival College of Charleston. No team on the schedule was included in the Preseason Top 25 or the Top 25 during the season.

Date time, TV	Opponent	Result	Record	Site (attendance) city, state
Exhibition
October 29, 2011; 5:00 p.m.	Tennessee Wesleyan	W 87–60		McAlister Field House (N/A); Charleston, SC
Regular season
November 11, 2011*; 12:00 a.m., CBSSN	vs. VMI; All-Military Classic	L 100–103	0–1	Clune Arena (3,679); Colorado Springs, CO
November 12, 2011*; 8:30 p.m.	vs. Army; All-Military Classic	W 83–72	1–1	Clune Arena (N/A); Colorado Springs, CO
November 16, 2011*; 7:05 p.m., ESPN3	Clemson	L 50–73	1–2	McAlister Field House (5,186); Charleston, SC
November 21, 2011*; 7:05 p.m.	Florida Christian College	W 97–44	2–2	McAlister Field House (807); Charleston, SC
November 26, 2011*; 7:00 p.m.	at High Point	L 72–80 ^{OT}	2–3	Millis Athletic Convocation Center (1,602); High Point, NC
December 1, 2011; 7:00 p.m., ESPN3	at College of Charleston	L 64–83	2–4(0–1)	TD Arena (5,101); Charleston, SC
December 3, 2011; 7:00 p.m.	at Wofford	L 63–82	2–5 (0–2)	Benjamin Johnson Arena (1,029); Spartanburg, SC
December 6, 2011*; 7:05 p.m.	Coastal Carolina	L 58–80	2–6	McAlister Field House (1,409); Charleston, SC
December 14, 2011*; 7:05 p.m.	Charleston Southern	L 69–88	2–7	McAlister Field House (1,129); Charleston, SC
December 19, 2011*; 7:00 p.m.	at James Madison	L 49–67	2–8	JMU Convocation Center (3,150); Harrisonburg, VA
December 22, 2011*; 9:00 p.m.	at Denver	L 58–70	2–9	Magness Arena (6,355); Denver, CO
December 29, 2011*; 7:00 p.m., SportSouth	at Tennessee	L 55–86	2–10	Thompson-Boling Arena (16,245); Knoxville, TN
January 2, 2012*; 7:05 p.m.	UVa-Wise	W 91–74	3–10	McAlister Field House (906); Charleston, SC
January 5, 2012; 7:00 p.m.	at Furman	L 45–77	3–11 (0–3)	Timmons Arena (1,239); Greenville, SC
January 7, 2012; 7:05 p.m.	Samford	W 73–62	4–11 (1–3)	McAlister Field House (1,023); Charleston, SC
January 12, 2012; 7:05 p.m.	Elon	L 55–70	4–12 (1–4)	McAlister Field House (1,314); Charleston, SC
January 14, 2012; 7:05 p.m.	UNC Greensboro	L 66–67	4–13 (1–5)	McAlister Field House (1,026); Charleston, SC
January 21, 2012; 7:00 p.m.	at Davidson	L 51–80	4–12 (1–6)	John M. Belk Arena (4,546); Davidson, NC
January 23, 2012; 7:00 p.m.	at Georgia Southern	L 72–78 ^{2OT}	4–15 (1–7)	Hanner Fieldhouse (1,565); Statesboro, GA
January 26, 2012; 7:05 p.m.	Wofford	L 55–62	4–16 (1–8)	McAlister Field House (1,223); Charleston, SC
January 28, 2012; 7:05 p.m.	Furman	L 58–67	4–17 (1–9)	McAlister Field House (1,602); Charleston, SC
February 2, 2012; 7:00 p.m.	at UNC Greensboro	L 71–81	4–18 (1–10)	Greensboro Coliseum (2,763); Greensboro, NC
February 4, 2012; 7:00 p.m.	at Elon	L 66–71	4–19 (1–11)	Alumni Gym (1,563); Elon, NC
February 9, 2012; 7:05 p.m.	Davidson	L 66–77	4–20 (1–12)	McAlister Field House (2,289); Charleston, SC
February 11, 2012; 7:05 p.m.	Georgia Southern	L 72–73 ^{OT}	4–21 (1–13)	McAlister Field House (2,518); Charleston, SC
February 16, 2012; 7:05 p.m.	at Western Carolina	L 53–70	4–22 (1–14)	Ramsey Center (1,872); Cullowhee, NC
February 18, 2012; 7:05 p.m.	at Chattanooga	W 48–46	5–22 (2–14)	McKenzie Arena (3,238); Chattanooga, TN
February 22, 2012; 7:05 p.m.	Appalachian State	W 62–51	6–22 (3–14)	McAlister Field House (1,158); Charleston, SC
February 25, 2012; 12:00 p.m.	College of Charleston	L 47–55	6–23 (3–15)	McAlister Field House (4,166); Charleston, SC
2012 Southern Conference men's basketball tournament
March 2, 2012; 2:00 p.m.	Western Carolina; First round	L 56–68	6–24	Asheville Civic Center (5,254); Asheville, NC
*Non-conference game. (#) Tournament seedings in parentheses. All times are in Eastern.
