= 2011–12 Elon Phoenix men's basketball team =

American college basketball season

2011–12 Elon Phoenix men's basketball
- Conference: Southern Conference
- North
- Record: 15–16 (9–9 SoCon)
- Head coach: Matt Matheny
- Assistant coaches: Tim Sweeney; Will Roberson; Jack Wooten
- Home arena: Alumni Gym

2011–12 Southern Conference men's basketball standings
	Conf.				Overall
Team	W		L	PCT	W		L	PCT
North
UNC Greensboro	10	–	8	.556	13	–	19	.406
Elon	9	–	9	.500	15	–	16	.484
Samford	8	–	10	.444	11	–	19	.367
Western Carolina	8	–	10	.444	17	–	18	.486
Appalachian State	7	–	11	.389	13	–	18	.419
Chattanooga	5	–	13	.278	11	–	21	.344
South
Davidson†	16	–	2	.889	25	–	8	.758
Georgia Southern	12	–	6	.667	15	–	15	.500
Wofford	12	–	6	.667	19	–	14	.576
College of Charleston	10	–	8	.556	19	–	12	.613
Furman	8	–	10	.444	15	–	16	.484
The Citadel	3	–	15	.167	6	–	24	.200
† SoCon tournament winner As of March 15, 2012; Rankings from AP Poll

The 2011–12 Elon Phoenix men's basketball team represented Elon University during the 2011–12 college basketball season. This was head coach Matt Matheny's third season at Elon. The Phoenix competed in the Southern Conference's North Division and played their home games at Alumni Gym.

== Roster ==
#	Name	Height	Weight (lbs.)	Position	Class	Hometown
0	Josh Bonney	5'10"	170	G	Jr.	Houston, Texas
1	Drew Spradlin	6'5"	192	G	Sr.	Wheelersburg, Ohio
3	Lucas Weavil	5'11"	180	G	So.	Greensboro, North Carolina
10	Austin Hamilton	5'10"	175	G	Fr.	Herndon, Virginia
11	Kevin Blake	6'3"	180	G	Fr.	Toronto, Ontario
12	Roger Dugas	6'8"	205	F	Jr.	Georgeville, Quebec
14	John Moody	6'4"	205	G	Jr.	Asheville, North Carolina
20	Jack Isenbarger	6'2"	175	G	So.	Zionsville, Indiana
21	Ryley Beaumont	6'7"	195	F	So.	Millersville, Maryland
23	Egheosa Edomwonyi	6'7"	230	F	So.	Newark, New Jersey
24	Sebastian Koch	6'8"	190	G	So.	Munich, Germany
31	Lucas Troutman	6'10"	205	F	So.	Belton, South Carolina
32	Ryan Winters	6'7"	195	F	Fr.	Denver, Colorado
44	Brett Ervin	6'7"	240	F	Jr.	Buckhannon, West Virginia
45	Aaron Smith	5'11"	165	G	Jr.	Raleigh, North Carolina

== Schedule and results ==
Date time, TV	Rank^{#}	Opponent^{#}	Result	Record	Site (attendance) city, state
Exhibition
November 3, 2011*; 7:00 pm		Washington and Lee	W 96–48		Alumni Gym (634); Elon, North Carolina
Regular season
November 11, 2011*; 7:00 pm		at Massachusetts	L 67–85	0–1	Mullins Center (3,093); Amherst, Massachusetts
November 15, 2011*; 7:00 pm		South Carolina	W 58–53	1–1	Alumni Gym (1,589); Elon, North Carolina
November 18, 2011*; 8:00 pm		Rutgers–Camden	W 87–53	2–1	Alumni Gym (1,005); Elon, North Carolina
November 22, 2011*; 7:00 pm		at Princeton	W 56–55	3–1	Jadwin Gymnasium (1,498); Princeton, New Jersey
November 25, 2011*; 7:00 pm		at NC State	L 67–82	3–2	RBC Center (7,315); Raleigh, North Carolina
November 30, 2011; 7:00 pm		Furman	W 77–70	4–2 (1–0)	Alumni Gym (958); Elon, North Carolina
December 3, 2011*; 2:00 pm		Navy	W 51–48	5–2	Alumni Gym (1,037); Elon, North Carolina
December 7, 2011; 7:00 pm		at UNC Greensboro	W 80–72	6–2 (2–0)	Greensboro Coliseum (3,275); Greensboro, North Carolina
December 11, 2011*; 2:00 pm		Lynchburg	W 109–67	7–2	Alumni Gym (686); Elon, North Carolina
December 17, 2011*; 12:00 pm		at Dartmouth	L 54–62	7–3	Leede Arena (827); Hanover, New Hampshire
December 22, 2011*; 7:30 pm		at San Diego State	L 55–81	7–4	Viejas Arena (11,370); San Diego, California
December 29, 2011*; 7:00 pm, ESPNU		at No. 6 North Carolina	L 62–100	7–5	Dean Smith Center (20,880); Chapel Hill, North Carolina
January 5, 2012; 7:00 pm		Georgia Southern	L 63–69	7–6 (3–0)	Alumni Gym (1,310); Elon, North Carolina
January 8, 2012*; 2:00 pm		Columbia	L 60–65	7–7	Alumni Gym (1,306); Elon, North Carolina
January 12, 2012; 7:05 pm		at The Citadel	W 70–55	8–7 (–1)	McAlister Field House (1,314); Charleston, South Carolina
January 14, 2012; 4:00 pm, ESPN3		at College of Charleston	L 44–63	8–8 (3–2)	TD Arena (4,022); Charleston, South Carolina
January 19, 2012; 7:00 pm		Samford	L 80–86	8–9 (3–3)	Alumni Gym (986); Elon, North Carolina
January 21, 2012; 7:00 pm		Chattanooga	W 88–87	9–9 (4–3)	Alumni Gym (1,607); Elon, North Carolina
January 26, 2012; 7:00 pm		at Western Carolina	W 71–63	10–9 (5–3)	Ramsey Center (1,521); Cullowhee, North Carolina
January 28, 2012; 2:00 pm		at Appalachian State	L 66–81	10–10 (5–4)	Holmes Center (2,355); Boone, North Carolina
February 2, 2012; 7:00 pm		College of Charleston	W 99–98 ^{2OT}	11–10 (6–4)	Alumni Gym (1,157); Elon, North Carolina
February 4, 2012; 7:00 pm		The Citadel	W 71–66	12–10 (7–4)	Alumni Gym (1,563); Elon, North Carolina
February 6, 2012; 7:00 pm		Appalachian State	W 82–59	13–10 (8–4)	Alumni Gym (1,510); Elon, North Carolina
February 9, 2012; 7:00 pm, ESPN3		at Chattanooga	L 75–83	13–11 (8–5)	McKenzie Arena (2,606); Chattanooga, Tennessee
February 11, 2012; 5:00 pm		at Samford	L 78–87	13–12 (8–6)	Pete Hanna Center (2,572); Homewood, Alabama
February 15, 2012; 7:00 pm		at Wofford	L 59–72	13–13 (8–7)	Benjamin Johnson Arena (1,336); Spartanburg, South Carolina
February 18, 2012; 7:00 pm		Western Carolina	L 76–78 ^{OT}	13–14 (8–8)	Alumni Gym (1,163); Elon, North Carolina
February 23, 2012; 7:00 pm		at Davidson	L 45–66	13–15 (8–9)	John M. Belk Arena (4,154); Davidson, North Carolina
February 25, 2012; 7:00 pm		UNC Greensboro	W 93–79	14–15 (9–9)	Alumni Gym (1,804); Elon, North Carolina
Southern Conference tournament
March 3, 2012; 8:30 pm, ESPN3		vs. Georgia Southern; Quarterfinals	W 65–58	15–15	U.S. Cellular Center (5,432); Asheville, North Carolina
March 4, 2012; 8:30 pm, ESPN3		vs. Davidson; Semifinals	L 67–83	15–16	U.S. Cellular Center (6,364); Asheville, North Carolina
*Non-conference game. ^{#}Rankings from AP Poll. (#) Tournament seedings in parentheses. All times are in Eastern Time.
