= 2011–12 Samford Bulldogs basketball team =

American college basketball season

2011–12 Samford Bulldogs men's basketball
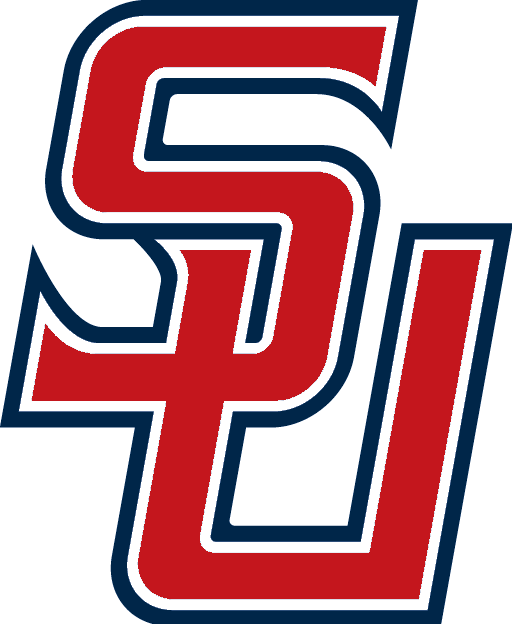
- Conference: Southern Conference
- North
- Record: 11–19 (8–10 SoCon)
- Head coach: Jimmy Tillette
- Assistant coaches: Paul Kelly; Lee Burgess; Terrence Johnson
- Home arena: Pete Hanna Center

2011–12 Southern Conference men's basketball standings
	Conf.				Overall
Team	W		L	PCT	W		L	PCT
North
UNC Greensboro	10	–	8	.556	13	–	19	.406
Elon	9	–	9	.500	15	–	16	.484
Samford	8	–	10	.444	11	–	19	.367
Western Carolina	8	–	10	.444	17	–	18	.486
Appalachian State	7	–	11	.389	13	–	18	.419
Chattanooga	5	–	13	.278	11	–	21	.344
South
Davidson†	16	–	2	.889	25	–	8	.758
Georgia Southern	12	–	6	.667	15	–	15	.500
Wofford	12	–	6	.667	19	–	14	.576
College of Charleston	10	–	8	.556	19	–	12	.613
Furman	8	–	10	.444	15	–	16	.484
The Citadel	3	–	15	.167	6	–	24	.200
† SoCon tournament winner As of March 15, 2012; Rankings from AP Poll

The 2011–12 Samford Bulldogs basketball team represented Samford University during the 2011–12 college basketball season. This was head coach Jimmy Tillette's fifteenth season at Samford. The Bulldogs compete in the Southern Conference's North Division and played their home games at Pete Hanna Center. They finished the season 11–19, 8–10 on SoCon play to finish in a tie for third place in the North Division and lost in the first round of the Southern Conference tournament to Furman.

== Roster ==
#	Name	Height	Weight (lbs.)	Position	Class	Hometown
1	Drew Windler	6'9"	200	C	So.	South Milwaukee, WI
2	Brandon Hayman	6'3"	185	G	Fr.	Braselton, GA
5	Jeffrey Merritt	6'6"	205	G	Sr.	Oklahoma City, OK
10	Connor Miller	6'3"	175	G	Fr.	Stanley, WI
11	Raijon Kelly	6'4"	170	G	Fr.	Maplewood, MN
12	John Peterson	6'7"	195	F	Sr.	Boca Raton, FL
14	Kaylin Johnson	6'0"	180	G	Sr.	Baton Rouge, LA
15	Hamilton Bailey	6'4"	185	G	So.	Atlanta, GA
21	Gregg Wooten	6'2"	190	G	Sr.	Memphis, TN
23	Matthew Friday	6'8"	235	C	Sr.	Grapevine, TX
24	Will Cook	6'4"	185	G	So.	Dallas, TX
25	Devin McNeil	6'0"	180	G	Fr.	Birmingham, AL
33	Levi Barnes	6'10"	215	C	So.	Douglasville, GA
35	Tyler Hood	6'6"	200	F	Fr.	Kingston, TN

== Schedule and results ==
Date time, TV	Rank^{#}	Opponent^{#}	Result	Record	Site (attendance) city, state
Exhibition
11/7/2011*; 7:00 p.m.		Berry	W 87–47		Pete Hanna Center (795); Homewood, AL
Regular season
11/12/2011*; 8:00 p.m.		Youngstown State	L 69–76	0–1	Pete Hanna Center (873); Homewood, AL
11/18/2011*; 7:00 p.m.		at Jacksonville	L 57–70	0–2	Jacksonville Veterans Memorial Arena (1,955); Jacksonville, FL
11/22/2011*; 8:00 p.m.		Georgia State	L 47–55	0–3	Pete Hanna Center (482); Homewood, AL
11/26/2011*; 8:00 p.m.		at Texas–Arlington	W 71–69	1–3	Texas Hall (697); Arlington, TX
12/1/2011; 8:00 p.m.		Western Carolina	L 71–75	1–4 (0–1)	Pete Hanna Center (821); Homewood, AL
12/5/2011*; 8:00 p.m.		Texas-San Antonio	L 52–74	1–5	Pete Hanna Center (527); Homewood, AL
12/7/2011; 8:00 p.m.		Mercer	L 78–83 ^{OT}	1–6	Pete Hanna Center (1,036); Homewood, AL
12/10/2011*; 5:00 p.m.		Lindsey Wilson	W 82–56	2–6	Pete Hanna Center (972); Homewood, AL
12/17/2011*; 5:00 p.m.		Spring Hill	W 90–64	3–6	Pete Hanna Center (972); Homewood, AL
12/20/2011*; 7:00 p.m., ESPN2		at No. 3 Kentucky	L 50–82	3–7	Rupp Arena (21,984); Lexington, KY
12/28/2011*; 8:00 p.m.		at Sam Houston State	L 58–74	3–8	Johnson Coliseum (788); Huntsville, TX
12/31/2011*; 2:00 p.m., ESPN3		at Maryland	L 63–75	3–9	Comcast Center (11,429); College Park, MD
1/5/2012; 8:00 p.m.		Appalachian State	L 63–68	3–10 (0–2)	Pete Hanna Center (584); Homewood, AL
1/7/2012; 7:05 p.m.		at The Citadel	L 62–73	3–11 (0–3)	McAlister Field House (1,023); Charleston, SC
1/12/2012; 7:00 p.m.		at Georgia Southern	L 53–58	3–12 (0–4)	Hanner Fieldhouse (1,372); Statesboro, GA
1/14/2012; 5:00 p.m.		Chattanooga	W 81–70	4–12 (1–4)	Pete Hanna Center (1,012); Homewood, AL
1/19/2012; 7:00 p.m.		at Elon	W 86–80	5–12 (2–4)	Alumni Gym (986); Elon, NC
1/22/2012; 2:00 p.m.		at UNC Greensboro	L 60–61	5–13 (2–5)	Greensboro Coliseum (2,328); Greensboro, NC
1/26/2012; 8:00 p.m., ESPN3		Georgia Southern	W 57–55	6–13 (3–5)	Pete Hanna Center (902); Homewood, AL
1/28/2012; 5:00 p.m.		Davidson	W 77–74	7–13 (4–6)	Pete Hanna Center (1,257); Homewood, AL
1/30/2012; 8:00 p.m.		College of Charleston	L 52–68	7–14 (4–7)	Pete Hanna Center (1,052); Homewood, AL
2/2/2012; 6:00 p.m.		at Appalachian State	W 53–52	8–14 (5–6)	Holmes Center (1,022); Boone, NC
2/4/2012; 2:00 p.m.		at Wofford	W 66–61	9–14 (6–6)	Benjamin Johnson Arena (2,012); Spartanburg, SC
2/9/2012; 8:00 p.m.		UNC Greensboro	L 69–71	9–15 (6–7)	Pete Hanna Center (1,048); Homewood, AL
2/11/2012; 5:00 p.m.		Elon	W 87–78	10–15 (7–7)	Pete Hanna Center (2,572); Homewood, AL
2/15/2012; 7:00 p.m.		at Davidson	L 54–81	10–16 (7–8)	John M. Belk Arena (3,686); Davidson, NC
2/18/2012; 5:00 p.m.		Furman	W 55–49	11–16 (8–8)	Pete Hanna Center (1,204); Homewood, AL
2/23/2012; 7:00 p.m.		at Western Carolina	L 77–79	11–17 (8–9)	Ramsey Center (1,097); Cullowhee, NC
2/25/2012; 8:00 p.m.		at Chattanooga	L 78–86	11–18 (8–10)	McKenzie Arena (4,120); Chattanooga, TN
Southern Conference tournament
3/2/2012; 6:00 p.m.		vs. Furman; First Round	L 66–75	11–19	U.S. Cellular Center (4,741); Asheville, NC
*Non-conference game. ^{#}Rankings from AP Poll. (#) Tournament seedings in parentheses. All times are in Eastern Time.
