= 2011–12 Appalachian State Mountaineers men's basketball team =

American college basketball season

2011–12 Appalachian State Mountaineers men's basketball
- Conference: Southern Conference
- North
- Record: 13–18 (7–11 SoCon)
- Head coach: Jason Capel (2nd season)
- Home arena: Holmes Center

2011–12 Southern Conference men's basketball standings
	Conf.				Overall
Team	W		L	PCT	W		L	PCT
North
UNC Greensboro	10	–	8	.556	13	–	19	.406
Elon	9	–	9	.500	15	–	16	.484
Samford	8	–	10	.444	11	–	19	.367
Western Carolina	8	–	10	.444	17	–	18	.486
Appalachian State	7	–	11	.389	13	–	18	.419
Chattanooga	5	–	13	.278	11	–	21	.344
South
Davidson†	16	–	2	.889	25	–	8	.758
Georgia Southern	12	–	6	.667	15	–	15	.500
Wofford	12	–	6	.667	19	–	14	.576
College of Charleston	10	–	8	.556	19	–	12	.613
Furman	8	–	10	.444	15	–	16	.484
The Citadel	3	–	15	.167	6	–	24	.200
† SoCon tournament winner As of March 15, 2012; Rankings from AP Poll

The 2011–12 Appalachian State Mountaineers men's basketball team represented Appalachian State University during the 2011–12 NCAA Division I men's basketball season. The Mountaineers, led by second year head coach Jason Capel, played their home games at the Holmes Center and are members of the Southern Conference's North Division. They finished the season 13–18, 7–11 in SoCon play to finish in fifth place in the North Division and lost in the quarterfinals of the SoCon tournament to UNC Greensboro.

== Roster ==
Number	Name	Position	Height	Weight	Year	Hometown
1	Rodney Milum	G	6'0"	185	Jr.	Houston, TX
2	Tab Hamilton	G	6'3"	180	Fr.	Winston-Salem, NC
3	G.J. Vilarino	G	6'1"	185	So.	McKinney, TX
11	Nathan Healy	F	6'7"	210	Jr.	New Bern, NC
13	Jamaal Trice	G-F	6'6"	220	Jr.	Los Angeles, CA
21	Omar Carter	G	6'5"	220	Sr.	Charlotte, NC
22	Griffin Shaw	G	6'0"	175	So.	Charlotte, NC
23	Mike Neal	G	6'2"	185	Fr.	Greensboro, NC
24	Brian Okam	C	7'0"	245	So.	Enugu, Nigeria
32	Isaac Butts	C	6'10"	285	Sr.	Milledgeville, GA
33	Mitch Woods	G	6'3"	195	So.	Naples, FL
50	Andre Williamson	F	6'7"	245	Sr.	Dayton, OH
54	Petey Hausley	F	6'6"	245	Sr.	Marion, NC

== Schedule ==
Date time, TV	Rank^{#}	Opponent^{#}	Result	Record	High points	High rebounds	High assists	Site (attendance) city, state
Regular Season
November 11, 2011*; 7:00 pm		Lees-McRae	W 90–61	1–0	16 – Williamson	11 – Williamson	7 – Woods	Holmes Center (1,689); Boone, NC
November 15, 2011*; 7:00 pm		at East Tennessee State	L 68–81	1–1	18 – Trice	11 – Butts	4 – Tied	ETSU/MSHA Athletic Center (3,789); Johnson City, TN
November 19, 2011*; 8:00 pm		at Tennessee Tech	W 68–63	2–1	19 – Tied	7 – Butts	4 – Woods	Hooper Eblen Center (1,650); Cookeville, TN
November 22, 2011*; 7:00 pm		vs. East Carolina	L 47–67	2–2	27 – Trice	6 – Williamson	2 – Healy	Time Warner Cable Arena (3,719); Charlotte, NC
November 26, 2011*; 2:00 pm		Milligan	W 81–58	3–2	18 – Butts	18 – Williamson	3 – Vilarino	Holmes Center (1,058); Boone, NC
December 1, 2011; 8:00 pm		UNC Greensboro	W 78–64	4–2 (1–0)	24 – Carter	12 – Carter	4 – Tied	Holmes Center (1,679); Boone, NC
December 3, 2011; 7:30 pm		at Georgia Southern	L 62–73	4–3 (1–1)	13 – Tied	9 – Williamson	3 – Woods	Hanner Fieldhouse (1,536); Statesboro, GA
December 6, 2011*; 8:00 pm, Big Ten Network		at Minnesota	L 56–70	4–4	18 – Carter	8 – Tied	3 – Tied	Williams Arena (10,782); Minneapolis, MN
December 10, 2011*; 2:00 pm		East Tennessee State	L 48–65	4–5	12 – Tied	7 – Carter	4 – Neal	Holmes Center (1,703); Boone, NC
December 17, 2011*; 6:00 pm, ESPNU		at No. 6 North Carolina	L 82–97	4–6	21 – Carter	4 – Butts	3 – Tied	Dean Smith Center (20,892); Chapel Hill, NC
December 22, 2011*; 7:00 pm		Campbell	W 77–74	5–6	17 – Trice	5 – Williamson	4 – Carter	Holmes Center (1,076); Boone, NC
December 30, 2011*; 7:00 pm		at Miami	L 54–84	5–7	19 – Williamson	7 – Williamson	7 – Neal	BankUnited Center (3,363); Coral Gables, FL
January 5, 2012; 8:00 pm		at Samford	W 68–63	6–7 (2–1)	17 – Carter	8 – Tied	3 – Tied	Pete Hanna Center (584); Homewood, AL
January 7, 2012; 7:00 pm		at Chattanooga	L 63–65	6–8 (2–2)	22 – Hamilton	7 – Carter	5 – Carter	McKenzie Arena (3,245); Chattanooga, TN
January 12, 2012; 7:00 pm, ESPN3		Furman	W 56–50	7–8 (3–2)	15 – Neal	6 – Carter	4 – Williamson	Holmes Center (1,055); Boone, NC
January 14, 2012; 2:00 pm		Davidson	L 79–83	7–9 (3–3)	17 – Carter	6 – Carter	4 – Williamson	Holmes Center (2,071); Boone, NC
January 19, 2012; 7:00 pm		at Wofford	L 61–73	7–10 (3–4)	20 – Williamson	9 – Willamson	3 – Neal	Benjamin Johnson Arena (1,322); Spartanburg, SC
January 21, 2012; 2:00 pm		Western Carolina	W 84–72	8–10 (4–4)	21 – Trice	11 – Willliamson	4 – Neal	Holmes Center (3,476); Boone, NC
January 26, 2012; 7:00 pm		at UNC Greensboro	L 73–77	7–14 (5–4)	19 – Carter	8 – Williamson	3 – Neal	Greensboro Coliseum (3,440); Greensboro, NC
January 28, 2012; 2:00 pm		Elon	W 81–66	9–11 (5–5)	20 – Tied	11 – Carter	3 – Neal	Holmes Center (2,355); Boone, NC
February 2, 2012; 7:00 pm		Samford	L 52–53	9–12 (5–6)	14 – Healy	8 – Tied	4 – Carter	Holmes Center (1,022); Boone, NC
February 4, 2012; 2:00 pm		College of Charleston	L 62–74	9–13 (5–7)	12 – Healy	8 – Tied	4 – Neal	Holmes Center (2,533); Boone, NC
February 6, 2012; 7:00 pm		at Elon	L 59–82	9–14 (5–8)	14 – Healy	10 – Butts	4 – Carter	Alumni Gym (1,510); Elon, NC
February 9, 2012; 7:00 pm		at Furman	W 79–69	10–14 (6–8)	18 – Neal	9 – Vilarino	4 – Neal	Timmons Arena (1,230); Greenville, SC
February 11, 2012; 2:00 pm		Wofford	L 64–66	10–15 (6–9)	15 – Neal	6 – Williamson	3 – Neal	Holmes Center (2,077); Boone, NC
February 15, 2012; 7:00 pm		Chattanooga	W 79–70	11–15 (7–9)	23 – Neal	16 – Butts	4 – Woods	Holmes Center (1,271); Boone, NC
February 18, 2012*; 2:00 pm		Winthrop; BracketBusters	W 76–64	12–15 (7–9)	15 – Tied	15 – Butts	4 – Neal	Holmes Center (1,590); Boone, NC
February 22, 2012; 7:05 pm		at The Citadel	L 51–62	12–16 (7–10)	19 – Healy	15 – Williamson	3 – Woods	McAlister Field House (1,158); Charleston, SC
February 25, 2012; 2:00 pm		at Western Carolina	L 75–83	12–17 (7–11)	15 – Williamson	7 – Butts	6 – Neal	Ramsey Center (3,628); Cullowhee, NC
SoCon tournament
March 2, 2012; 11:30 am		vs. College of Charleston; First Round	W 93–81	13–18	19 – Carter	15 – Williamson	3 – Tied	U.S. Cellular Center (5,254); Asheville, NC
March 3, 2012; 12:00 pm, ESPN3		vs. UNC Greensboro; Quarterfinals	L 55–65	13–19	16 – Butts	10 – Butts	2 – Neal	U.S. Cellular Center; Asheville, NC
*Non-conference game. ^{#}Rankings from AP Poll. (#) Tournament seedings in parentheses. All times are in Eastern Time.

"Appalachian State Mountaineers Basketball 2011–12 Schedule". ESPN.com.
