= 2011–12 UNC Greensboro Spartans men's basketball team =

American college basketball season

2011–12 UNC Greensboro Spartans men's basketball

SoCon North Division champions
- Conference: Southern Conference
- North
- Record: 13–19 (10–8 SoCon)
- Head coach: Mike Dement (first 10 games); Wes Miller (interim)
- Assistant coaches: Corey Gipson; Kevin Oleksiak
- Home arena: Greensboro Coliseum

2011–12 Southern Conference men's basketball standings
	Conf.				Overall
Team	W		L	PCT	W		L	PCT
North
UNC Greensboro	10	–	8	.556	13	–	19	.406
Elon	9	–	9	.500	15	–	16	.484
Samford	8	–	10	.444	11	–	19	.367
Western Carolina	8	–	10	.444	17	–	18	.486
Appalachian State	7	–	11	.389	13	–	18	.419
Chattanooga	5	–	13	.278	11	–	21	.344
South
Davidson†	16	–	2	.889	25	–	8	.758
Georgia Southern	12	–	6	.667	15	–	15	.500
Wofford	12	–	6	.667	19	–	14	.576
College of Charleston	10	–	8	.556	19	–	12	.613
Furman	8	–	10	.444	15	–	16	.484
The Citadel	3	–	15	.167	6	–	24	.200
† SoCon tournament winner As of March 15, 2012; Rankings from AP Poll

The 2011–12 UNC Greensboro Spartans men's basketball team represented the University of North Carolina at Greensboro during the 2011–12 NCAA Division I men's basketball season. The Spartans began the year coached by Mike Dement who resigned after ten games. Wes Miller was named interim coach on December 13, 2011, and became the youngest Division I men's basketball coach in the nation. The team played its home games at Greensboro Coliseum and were members of the North Division of the Southern Conference. They finished the season 13–19, 10–8 in SoCon play, to be champions of the North Division. They lost in the semifinals of the Southern Conference Basketball tournament to Western Carolina.

== Roster ==
Number	Name	Position	Height	Weight	Year	Hometown
0	David Williams	G	6' 6"	205	So.	Jacksonville, FL
1	Drew Parker	G	6' 1"	178	So.	LaPorte, TX
2	Thomas Sumpter	G	6' 2"	170	Fr.	Durham, NC
3	Derrell Armstrong	G	6' 1"	215	Jr.	Mechanicsville, MD
4	Kendall Bethea	G	6' 2"	210	So.	Lincolnton, NC
11	Korey Van Dussen	G	6' 1"	175	Jr.	Zeeland, MI
12	Kyle Randall	G	5' 10"	172	Jr.	Youngstown, OH
13	Aloysius Henry	F	6' 10"	230	Sr.	St. Lucia
15	Trevis Simpson	G–F	6' 4"	185	So.	Douglas, GA
21	Elhanan Bone	F	6' 5"	220	Sr.	Sandersville, GA
25	Demetrius Robinson	G	6' 3"	195	Jr.	Fuquay-Varina, NC
31	Nicholas Paulos	G–F	6' 7"	185	Fr.	Salt Lake City, UT
33	Tyler McNeely	F	6' 3"	220	So.	Princeton, NJ
34	Cody Henegar	F	6' 8"	202	So.	South Pittsburg, TN
41	Aaron Brackett	F	6' 8"	240	Sr.	Virginia Beach, VA
50	Brian Cole	F–C	6' 8"	232	Jr.	Dacula, GA
51	Tayler Hoffer	F	6' 4"	210	So.	Poulsbo, WA

== Schedule ==
Date time, TV	Rank^{#}	Opponent^{#}	Result	Record	Site (attendance) city, state
Exhibition
November 3, 2011*; 7:05 p.m.		Greensboro College	W 91–48		Fleming Gymnasium (1,425); Greensboro, NC
Regular season
November 11, 2011*; 7:00 p.m.		at Tennessee; Maui Invitational opening game	L 63–92	0–1	Thompson-Boling Arena (17,483); Knoxville, TN
November 14, 2011*; 7:00 p.m.		at Georgetown; Maui Invitational opening game	L 45–86	0–2	Verizon Center (7,987); Washington, D.C.
November 17, 2011*; 7:00 p.m.		UNC Pembroke	W 71–58	1–2	Greensboro Coliseum (3,059); Greensboro, NC
November 19, 2011*; 7:05 p.m.		at Middle Tennessee; Maui Invitational Regional Round	L 60–82	1–3	Murphy Center (5,411); Murfreesboro, TN
November 20, 2011*; 2:00 p.m.		vs. Towson; Maui Invitational Regional Round	W 72–60	2–3	Murphy Center (N/A); Murfreesboro, TN
November 28, 2011*; 7:00 p.m.		North Carolina A&T	L 65–87	2–4	Greensboro Coliseum (5,681); Greensboro, NC
December 1, 2011; 8:00 p.m.		at Appalachian State	L 64–78	2–5 (0–1)	Holmes Center (1,679); Boone, NC
December 3, 2011; 4:30 p.m.		at Western Carolina	L 69–73	2–6 (0–2)	Ramsey Center (1,637); Cullowhee, NC
December 5, 2011; 4:30 p.m.		Elon	L 72–80	2–7 (0–3)	Greensboro Coliseum (3,275); Greensboro, NC
December 11, 2011*; 1:00 p.m.		at Florida State	L 60–75	2–8	Donald L. Tucker Center (5,250); Tallahassee, FL
December 16, 2011*; 7:00 p.m.		East Carolina	L 62–71	2–9	Greensboro Coliseum (3,012); Greensboro, NC
December 19, 2011*; 7:00 p.m., ESPN3		at No. 5 Duke	L 63–90	2–10	Cameron Indoor Stadium (9,314); Durham, NC
December 22, 2011*; 7:00 p.m., ESPN3		VCU	L 68–80	2–11	Greensboro Coliseum (2,716); Greensboro, NC
December 30, 2011*; 4:00 p.m.		at Richmond	L 58–78	2–12	Robins Center (4,497); Richmond, VA
January 2, 2012*; 9:00 p.m., ESPN3		at Miami (FL)	L 89–99	2–13	BankUnited Center (2,900); Miami, FL
January 5, 2012; 7:00 p.m.		Davidson	L 63–92	2–14 (0–4)	Greensboro Coliseum (2,529); Greensboro, NC
January 12, 2012; 7:00 p.m., ESPN3		at College of Charleston	W 73–66	3–14 (1–4)	TD Arena (4,137); Charleston, SC
January 14, 2012; 7:05 p.m.		at The Citadel	W 67–66	4–14 (2–4)	McAlister Field House (1,026); Charleston, SC
January 19, 2012; 7:00 p.m.		Chattanooga	W 81–72	5–14 (3–4)	Greensboro Coliseum (2,369); Greensboro, NC
January 22, 2012; 2:00 p.m.		Samford	W 61–60	6–14 (4–4)	Greensboro Coliseum (2,328); Greensboro, NC
January 26, 2012; 7:00 p.m.		Appalachian State	W 77–73 ^{OT}	7–14 (5–4)	Greensboro Coliseum (3,440); Greensboro, NC
January 28, 2012; 2:00 p.m.		Western Carolina	W 89–86 ^{OT}	8–14 (6–4)	Greensboro Coliseum (3,585); Greensboro, NC
February 2, 2012; 7:00 p.m.		The Citadel	W 82–71	9–14 (7–4)	Greensboro Coliseum (2,763); Greensboro, NC
February 4, 2012; 3:00 p.m.		at Furman	L 85–93	9–15 (7–5)	Timmons Arena (1,855); Greenville, SC
February 9, 2012; 8:00 p.m.		at Samford	W 71–69	10–15 (8–5)	Pete Hanna Center (1,048); Homewood, AL
February 11, 2012; 7:30 p.m.		at Chattanooga	W 77–76	11–15 (9–5)	McKenzie Arena (5,166); Chattanooga, TN
February 15, 2012; 7:00 p.m.		College of Charleston	W 78–63	12–15 (10–5)	Greensboro Coliseum (2,894); Greensboro, NC
February 18, 2012; 7:30 p.m.		at Georgia Southern	L 69–83	12–16 (10–6)	Hanner Fieldhouse (2,837); Statesboro, GA
February 21, 2012; 7:00 p.m.		Wofford	L 56–68	12–17 (10–7)	Greensboro Coliseum (3,345); Greensboro, NC
February 25, 2012; 7:00 p.m.		at Elon	L 79–93	12–18 (10–8)	Alumni Gym (1,804); Elon, NC
Southern Conference tournament
March 3, 2012; 12:00 p.m., ESPN3		vs. Appalachian State; Quarterfinals	W 65–55	13–18	U.S. Cellular Center (7,464); Asheville, NC
March 4, 2012; 6:00 p.m., ESPN3		vs. Western Carolina; Semifinals	L 77–82	13–19	U.S. Cellular Center (6,364); Asheville, NC
*Non-conference game. ^{#}Rankings from AP poll. (#) Tournament seedings in parentheses. All times are in Eastern.
