= 2011–12 Chattanooga Mocs basketball team =

American college basketball season

2011–12 Chattanooga Mocs men's basketball
- Conference: Southern Conference
- Record: 11–21 (5–13 SoCon)
- Head coach: John Shulman (7th season)
- Assistant coaches: DeAntoine Beasley (1st season); Rick Cabrera (3rd season); Brent Jolly (5th season)
- Home arena: McKenzie Arena

2011–12 Southern Conference men's basketball standings
| | Conf. | | | | Overall |
| Team | W | | L | PCT | W | | L | PCT |
|---|---|---|---|---|---|---|---|---|
North
| UNC Greensboro | 10 | – | 8 | .556 | 13 | – | 19 | .406 |
| Elon | 9 | – | 9 | .500 | 15 | – | 16 | .484 |
| Samford | 8 | – | 10 | .444 | 11 | – | 19 | .367 |
| Western Carolina | 8 | – | 10 | .444 | 17 | – | 18 | .486 |
| Appalachian State | 7 | – | 11 | .389 | 13 | – | 18 | .419 |
| Chattanooga | 5 | – | 13 | .278 | 11 | – | 21 | .344 |
South
| Davidson† | 16 | – | 2 | .889 | 25 | – | 8 | .758 |
| Georgia Southern | 12 | – | 6 | .667 | 15 | – | 15 | .500 |
| Wofford | 12 | – | 6 | .667 | 19 | – | 14 | .576 |
| College of Charleston | 10 | – | 8 | .556 | 19 | – | 12 | .613 |
| Furman | 8 | – | 10 | .444 | 15 | – | 16 | .484 |
| The Citadel | 3 | – | 15 | .167 | 6 | – | 24 | .200 |
† SoCon tournament winner As of March 15, 2012; Rankings from AP Poll

The 2011–12 Chattanooga Mocs basketball team represented University of Tennessee at Chattanooga in the 2011–12 NCAA Division I men's basketball season. Their head coach was John Shulman. The Mocs played their home games at the McKenzie Arena.

== Roster ==
2011–12 Chattanooga Mocs men's basketball team
Players
Coaches

| Pos. | # | Name | Height | Weight | Year | Hometown |
|---|---|---|---|---|---|---|
| F | 0 | Omar Wattad | 6 ft 5 in (1.96 m) | 216 lb (98 kg) | Sr | Johnson City, TN |
| F | 1 | Lance Stokes | 6 ft 6 in (1.98 m) | 201 lb (91 kg) | Fr | Orlando, FL |
| G | 2 | Dontay Hampton | 6 ft 1 in (1.85 m) | 165 lb (75 kg) | RS Jr | Chattanooga, TN |
| G | 3 | Keegan Bell | 6 ft 1 in (1.85 m) | 185 lb (84 kg) | RS Sr | Huntsville, AL |
| F | 5 | Drew Baker | 6 ft 7 in (2.01 m) | 199 lb (90 kg) | RS So | Knoxville, TN |
| G | 10 | Martynas Bareika | 6 ft 4 in (1.93 m) | 186 lb (84 kg) | RS Fr | Kedainiai, LT |
| G | 11 | Ronrico White | 6 ft 3 in (1.91 m) | 165 lb (75 kg) | Fr | Knoxville, TN |
| F | 12 | Trey Brown | 6 ft 7 in (2.01 m) | 192 lb (87 kg) | Fr | Brandon, MS |
| F | 20 | Drazen Zlovaric | 6 ft 9 in (2.06 m) | 214 lb (97 kg) | RS Jr | Novi Sad, CS |
| F | 21 | Chris Early | 6 ft 7 in (2.01 m) | 235 lb (107 kg) | RS Sr | Huntington, WV |
| G | 22 | Ricky Taylor | 6 ft 5 in (1.96 m) | 180 lb (82 kg) | Sr | Brownsville, TN |
| F | 24 | Ryan Gentle | 6 ft 5 in (1.96 m) | 181 lb (82 kg) | RS Fr | Nashville, TN |
| F | 30 | Z. Mason | 6 ft 5 in (1.96 m) | 242 lb (110 kg) | RS So | Nashville, TN |
| F | 32 | Jahmal Burroughs | 6 ft 6 in (1.98 m) | 206 lb (93 kg) | Sr | New Orleans, LA |
| F | 34 | Jared Bryant | 6 ft 7 in (2.01 m) | 234 lb (106 kg) | Fr | Cincinnati, OH |
| F | 44 | Sam Watson | 6 ft 7 in (2.01 m) | 235 lb (107 kg) | Jr | Farragut, TN |

Head coach

- John Shulman (East Tennessee State)

Assistant coach(es)

- DeAntoine Beasley (Tennessee Tech)
- Rick Cabrera (Tennessee Tech)
- Brent Jolly (Tennessee Tech)

Legend

- (C) Team captain
- (S) Suspended
- (I) Ineligible
- (W) Walk-on
- Injured
- Current redshirt

Roster
Last update: 2011-Nov-3

Source: Chattanooga Men's Basketball Roster

== Schedule ==
| Date time, TV | Rank^{#} | Opponent^{#} | Result | Record | Site (attendance) city, state |
Exhibition
| Nov. 01*; 7:00 pm | | Tennessee Wesleyan | W 82–64 | – | McKenzie Arena (N/A); Chattanooga, TN |
Regular season
| Nov. 13*; 5:00 pm, BTN | | at Indiana; Hoosier Classic | L 53–78 | 0–1 | Assembly Hall (16,149); Bloomington, IN |
| Nov. 15*; 7:00 pm, WNDY | | at Butler; Hoosier Invitational | L 46–57 | 0–2 | Hinkle Fieldhouse (6,078); Indianapolis, IN |
| Nov. 18*; 7:00 pm | | Kennesaw State | L 59–65 | 0–3 | McKenzie Arena (2,881); Chattanooga, TN |
| Nov. 21*; 7:00 pm | | Warren Wilson | W 88–36 | 1–3 | McKenzie Arena (2,204); Chattanooga, TN |
| Nov. 25*; 7:00 pm | | Savannah State; Hoosier Invitational | W 65–63 | 2–3 | McKenzie Arena (2,283); Chattanooga, TN |
| Nov. 27*; 3:00 pm | | Gardner–Webb; Hoosier Invitational | L 74–76 ^{OT} | 2–4 | McKenzie Arena (2,189); Chattanooga, TN |
| Dec. 1; 7:00 pm | | at Georgia Southern | L 76–84 | 2–5 (0–1) | Hanner Fieldhouse (1,476); Statesboro, GA |
| Dec. 3; 4:00 pm, ESPN3 | | at College of Charleston | L 85–87 ^{2OT} | 2–6 (0–2) | TD Arena (4,358); Charleston, SC |
| Dec. 10*; 7:00 pm | | at Mercer | L 56–67 | 2–7 | University Center (1,795); Macon, GA |
| Dec. 13*; 7:00 pm | | Spalding | W 98–48 | 3–7 | McKenzie Arena (2,155); Chattanooga, TN |
| Dec. 17*; 8:00 pm, CSS | | at No. 3 Kentucky | L 62–87 | 3–8 | Rupp Arena (23,211); Lexington, KY |
| Dec. 21*; 12:00 pm | | Hiwassee | W 95–41 | 4–8 | McKenzie Arena (2,409); Chattanooga, TN |
| Dec. 29*; 7:00 pm | | Longwood; Dr. Pepper Classic | W 85–50 | 5–8 | McKenzie Arena (2,527); Chattanooga, TN |
| Dec. 30*; 7:00 pm | | Utah Valley State; Dr. Pepper Classic | W 74–59 | 6–8 | McKenzie Arena (2,653); Chattanooga, TN |
| Jan. 02*; 7:00 pm | | at Tennessee | L 63–76 | 6–9 | Thompson–Boling Arena (15,239); Knoxville, TN |
| Jan. 05; 7:00 pm | | Western Carolina | W 78–62 | 7–9 (1–2) | McKenzie Arena (2,554); Chattanooga, TN |
| Jan. 07; 7:00 pm | | Appalachian State | W 65–63 | 8–9 (2–2) | McKenzie Arena (3,245); Chattanooga, TN |
| Jan. 12; 7:00 pm | | Wofford | W 51–48 | 9–9 (3–2) | McKenzie Arena (2,959); Chattanooga, TN |
| Jan. 14; 4:00 pm | | at Samford | L 70–81 | 9–10 (3–3) | Hanna Center (1,012); Birmingham, AL |
| Jan. 19; 7:00 pm | | at UNC Greensboro | L 72–81 | 9–11 (3–4) | Greensboro Coliseum (2,369); Greensboro, NC |
| Jan. 21; 7:00 pm | | at Elon | L 87–88 | 9–12 (3–5) | Alumni Gym (1,607); Elon, NC |
| Jan. 26; 7:00 pm | | Davidson | L 63–64 | 9–13 (3–6) | McKenzie Arena (2,847); Chattanooga, TN |
| Jan. 28; 7:30 pm | | Georgia Southern | L 72–75 | 9–14 (3–7) | McKenzie Arena (4,170); Chattanooga, TN |
| Feb. 02; 7:00 pm | | at Western Carolina | L 76–82 | 9–15 (3–8) | Ramsey Center (2,047); Cullowhee, NC |
| Feb. 04; 4:00 pm | | at Davidson | L 61–88 | 9–16 (3–9) | Belk Arena (4,583); Davidson, NC |
| Feb. 09; 7:00 pm | | Elon | W 83–75 | 10–16 (4–9) | McKenzie Arena (2,606); Chattanooga, TN |
| Feb. 11; 7:30 pm | | UNC Greensboro | L 76–77 | 10–17 (4–10) | McKenzie Arena (5,166); Chattanooga, TN |
| Feb. 15; 7:00 pm | | at Appalachian State | L 70–79 | 10–18 (4–11) | Holmes Center (1,271); Boone, NC |
| Feb. 18; 7:00 pm | | The Citadel | L 46–48 | 10–19 (4–12) | McKenzie Arena (3,238); Chattanooga, TN |
| Feb. 23; 7:00 pm | | at Furman | L 55–65 | 10–20 (4–13) | Timmons Arena (–); Greenville, SC |
| Feb. 25; 7:30 pm | | Samford | W 86–78 | 11–20 (5–13) | McKenzie Arena (4,120); Chattanooga, TN |
SoCon tournament
| Mar. 02; 8:30 pm | | vs. Georgia Southern; First Round | L 70–76 | 11–21 (5–13) | U.S. Cellular Center (4,741); Asheville, NC |
*Non-conference game. ^{#}Rankings from Coaches' Poll. (#) Tournament seedings in parentheses. All times are in Eastern Time..

Source: 2011–12 Chattanooga Men's Basketball Schedule
