= 2011–12 Davidson Wildcats men's basketball team =

American college basketball season

2011–12 Davidson Wildcats men's basketball

SoCon tournament champions SoCon South Division Champions

NCAA Tournament, Round of 64
- Conference: Southern Conference
- South
- Record: 25–8 (16–2 SoCon)
- Head coach: Bob McKillop (23rd season)
- Assistant coaches: Landry Kosmalski; Jim Fox; Matt McKillop
- Home arena: John M. Belk Arena

2011–12 Southern Conference men's basketball standings
	Conf.				Overall
Team	W		L	PCT	W		L	PCT
North
UNC Greensboro	10	–	8	.556	13	–	19	.406
Elon	9	–	9	.500	15	–	16	.484
Samford	8	–	10	.444	11	–	19	.367
Western Carolina	8	–	10	.444	17	–	18	.486
Appalachian State	7	–	11	.389	13	–	18	.419
Chattanooga	5	–	13	.278	11	–	21	.344
South
Davidson†	16	–	2	.889	25	–	8	.758
Georgia Southern	12	–	6	.667	15	–	15	.500
Wofford	12	–	6	.667	19	–	14	.576
College of Charleston	10	–	8	.556	19	–	12	.613
Furman	8	–	10	.444	15	–	16	.484
The Citadel	3	–	15	.167	6	–	24	.200
† SoCon tournament winner As of March 15, 2012; Rankings from AP Poll

The 2011–12 Davidson Wildcats men's basketball team represented Davidson College in NCAA men's Division I competition. The Wildcats were coached by Bob McKillop in his 23rd year and played their home games at John M. Belk Arena. They compete in the Southern Conference's South Division. They finished the season 25–8, 16–2 in SoCon play to be crowned South Division Champions and overall regular season champions. They were the champions of the SoCon Basketball tournament to earn the conference's automatic bid into the 2012 NCAA tournament where they lost in the first round to Louisville.

== Roster ==
Note: Flags indicate national team eligibility at FIBA sanctioned events. Players may hold other non-FIBA nationality not displayed.

No.		Position	Player
1	(Tunisia)	F	Youssef Mejri
2	(United States)	G	Mason Archie II
4	(United States)	G	Tyler Kalinoski
5	(United States)	G	J.P. Kuhlman
12	(Canada)	G	Nik Cochran
14	(United States)	G	Clay Tormey
15	(United States)	F	Jake Cohen
20	(United States)	SG	Will Reigel

No.		Position	Player
22	(Scotland)	F	Ali Mackay
23	(United States)	G	Tom Droney
24	(United States)	F	De'Mon Brooks
25	(United States)	SG	A.J Atkinson
34	(Nigeria)	PF	Frank Ben-Eze
35	(Sweden)	G	Chris Czerapowicz
40	(United States)	F	Clint Mann

== Schedule ==
Date time, TV	Rank^{#}	Opponent^{#}	Result	Record	Site (attendance) city, state
Exhibition
October 29, 2011*; 7:00 pm		Lenoir-Rhyne	W 81–44		John M. Belk Arena (2,304); Davidson, NC
Regular season
November 11, 2011*; 8:00 pm		Guilford	W 111–64	1–0	John M. Belk Arena (3,423); Davidson, NC
November 14, 2011*; 8:15 pm		Richmond	W 74–61	2–0	John M. Belk Arena (3,887); Davidson, NC
November 18, 2011*; 6:00 pm		at No. 6 Duke	L 69–82	2–1	Cameron Indoor Stadium (9,314); Durham, NC
November 21, 2011*; 8:15 pm		Presbyterian	W 68–54	3–1	John M. Belk Arena (3,060); Davidson, NC
November 26, 2011*; 2:00 pm		at UNC Wilmington	W 70–67	4–1	Trask Coliseum (2,854); Wilmington, NC
December 1, 2011; 7:00 pm, ESPN3		at Wofford	W 72–69	5–1 (1–0)	Benjamin Johnson Arena (1,412); Spartanburg, SC
December 3, 2011; 7:00 pm		Furman	W 86–65	6–1 (2–0)	John M. Belk Arena (3,573); Davidson, NC
December 7, 2011*; 7:00 pm, ESPN3		Vanderbilt	L 83–87	6–2	John M. Belk Arena (4,475); Davidson, NC
December 10, 2011*; 7:00 pm		at Charlotte	L 61–84	6–3	Halton Arena (7,551); Charlotte, NC
December 19, 2011*; 9:00 pm, ESPNU		vs. No. 11 Kansas	W 80–74	7–3	Sprint Center (18,757); Kansas City, MO
December 22, 2011*; 7:00 pm		at Massachusetts	L 65–73	7–4	Mullins Center (3,821); Amherst, MA
December 29, 2011*; 7:00 pm		Penn	W 75–70	8–4	John M. Belk Arena (4,064); Davidson, NC
January 5, 2012; 7:00 pm		at UNC Greensboro	W 92–63	9–4 (3–0)	Greensboro Coliseum (2,529); Greensboro, NC
January 7, 2012; 12:00 pm		Georgia Southern	W 96–74	10–4 (4–0)	John M. Belk Arena (3,395); Davidson, NC
January 12, 2012; 7:00 pm		Western Carolina	W 88–67	11–4 (5–0)	John M. Belk Arena (3,293); Davidson, NC
January 14, 2012; 2:00 pm		at Appalachian State	W 83–79	12–4 (6–0)	Holmes Center (2,071); Boone, NC
January 19, 2012; 7:00 pm		College of Charleston	W 87–69	13–4 (7–0)	John M. Belk Arena (4,127); Davidson, NC
January 21, 2012; 7:00 pm		The Citadel	W 80–51	14–4 (8–0)	John M. Belk Arena (4,546); Davidson, NC
January 26, 2012; 7:00 pm		at Chattanooga	W 64–63	15–4 (9–0)	McKenzie Arena (2,847); Chattanooga, TN
January 28, 2012; 5:00 pm		at Samford	L 74–77	15–5 (9–1)	Pete Hanna Center (1,257); Homewood, AL
February 1, 2012; 7:00 pm		at Furman	W 71–53	16–5 (10–1)	Timmons Arena (2,324); Greenville, SC
February 4, 2012; 4:00 pm		Chattanooga	W 88–61	17–5 (11–1)	John M. Belk Arena (4,583); Davidson, NC
February 6, 2012; 7:00 pm		Wofford	W 76–54	18–5 (12–1)	John M. Belk Arena (3,864); Davidson, NC
February 9, 2012; 7:00 pm		at The Citadel	W 77–66	19–5 (13–1)	McAlister Field House (2,289); Charleston, SC
February 11, 2012; 12:00 pm		at College of Charleston	L 78–86	19–6 (13–2)	TD Arena (5,112); Charleston, SC
February 15, 2012; 7:00 pm		Samford	W 81–54	20–6 (14–2)	John M. Belk Arena (3,686); Davidson, NC
February 18, 2012*; 12:00 pm, ESPN2		No. 24 Wichita State; ESPN Bracketbusters	L 74–91	20–7	John M. Belk Arena (5,223); Davidson, NC
February 23, 2012; 7:00 pm		Elon	W 66–45	21–7 (15–2)	John M. Belk Arena (4,154); Davidson, NC
February 25, 2012; 7:00 pm		at Georgia Southern	W 71–54	22–7 (16–2)	Hanner Fieldhouse (6,364); Statesboro, GA
Southern Conference tournament
March 3, 2012; 6:00 pm, ESPN3		vs. Furman; Quarterfinals	W 73–54	23–7	U.S. Cellular Center (5,432); Asheville, NC
March 4, 2012; 8:30 pm, ESPN3		vs. Elon; Semifinals	W 83–67	24–7	U.S. Cellular Center (6,364); Asheville, NC
March 5, 2012; 9:00 pm, ESPN2		vs. Western Carolina; Championship Game	W 93–91 ^{2OT}	25–7	U.S. Cellular Center (6,049); Asheville, NC
2012 NCAA tournament
March 15, 2012*; 1:40 pm, TBS	No. (W 13)	vs. No. 17 (W 4) Louisville; 2nd round	L 62–69	25–8	Rose Garden (17,519); Portland, OR
*Non-conference game. ^{#}Rankings from AP Poll. (#) Tournament seedings in parentheses. All times are in Eastern Time (#) during NCAA Tournament is seed with Region.
