= 2011–12 Wofford Terriers men's basketball team =

American college basketball season

2011–12 Wofford Terriers men's basketball

CBI, First Round
- Conference: Southern Conference
- South Division
- Record: 19–14 (12–6 SoCon)
- Head coach: Mike Young
- Assistant coaches: Paul Harrison; Shane Nichols; Mark Prosser
- Home arena: Benjamin Johnson Arena

2011–12 Southern Conference men's basketball standings
	Conf.				Overall
Team	W		L	PCT	W		L	PCT
North
UNC Greensboro	10	–	8	.556	13	–	19	.406
Elon	9	–	9	.500	15	–	16	.484
Samford	8	–	10	.444	11	–	19	.367
Western Carolina	8	–	10	.444	17	–	18	.486
Appalachian State	7	–	11	.389	13	–	18	.419
Chattanooga	5	–	13	.278	11	–	21	.344
South
Davidson†	16	–	2	.889	25	–	8	.758
Georgia Southern	12	–	6	.667	15	–	15	.500
Wofford	12	–	6	.667	19	–	14	.576
College of Charleston	10	–	8	.556	19	–	12	.613
Furman	8	–	10	.444	15	–	16	.484
The Citadel	3	–	15	.167	6	–	24	.200
† SoCon tournament winner As of March 15, 2012; Rankings from AP Poll

The 2011–12 Wofford Terriers men's basketball team represented Wofford College during the 2011–12 NCAA Division I men's basketball season. The Terriers, led by 10th year head coach Mike Young, played their home games at Benjamin Johnson Arena and are members of the South Division of the Southern Conference. The Terriers finished the season 19–14, 12–6 in SoCon play. They were invited to the 2012 College Basketball Invitational where they lost in the first round.

== Roster ==
Number	Name	Position	Height	Weight	Year	Hometown
0	Lucas Brown	Guard	6–5	200	Freshman	Roseville, Minnesota
2	Karl Cochran	Guard	6–1	170	Freshman	Marietta, Georgia
3	John Swinton	Guard	6–1	185	Freshman	Mt. Pleasant, South Carolina
5	Jarell Byrd	Forward	6–6	192	Freshman	Lynn, Massachusetts
10	Kevin Giltner	Guard	6–6	200	Senior	Kingston Springs, Tennessee
11	Indiana Faithful	Guard	6–4	200	Freshman	Sydney, Australia
13	Taylor Wagener	Guard	6–3	185	Junior	Charlotte, North Carolina
14	Aerris Smith	Forward	6–7	240	Sophomore	Charlotte, North Carolina
15	Matt Steelman	Guard	6–2	180	Senior	Central, South Carolina
21	Drew Crowell	Forward	6–9	230	Senior	Charleston, South Carolina
25	Joseph Tecklenburg	Forward	6–4	200	Senior	Charleston, South Carolina
33	Kevin Hickson	Forward	6–8	215	Freshman	Matthews, North Carolina
34	Lee Skinner	Forward	6–6	205	Freshman	Lombard, Illinois
35	Brad Loesing	Guard	6–0	180	Senior	Cincinnati, Ohio
40	Cameron McQueen	Center	6–8	245	Sophomore	Charlotte, North Carolina
53	Domas Rinksalis	Forward	6–9	220	Sophomore	Šiauliai, Lithuania

== Schedule ==
Date time, TV	Rank^{#}	Opponent^{#}	Result	Record	Site (attendance) city, state
Regular Season
November 11, 2011*; 8:00 pm, CSS		at Georgia	L 49–62	0–1	Stegeman Coliseum (7,177); Athens, GA
November 13, 2011*; 5:00 pm		Emory and Henry	W 70–55	1–1	Benjamin Johnson Arena (708); Spartanburg, SC
November 19, 2011*; 8:00 pm		at No. 13 Wisconsin; Chicago Invitational Challenge First Round	L 33–69	1–2	Kohl Center (17,230); Madison, WI
November 22, 2011*; 8:00 pm		at Bradley; Chicago Invitational Challenge Second Round	W 70–66	2–2	Carver Arena (7,114); Peoria, IL
November 25, 2011*; 3:30 pm		vs. UMKC; Chicago Invitational Challenge Third Round	L 58–64 ^{OT}	2–3	Sears Centre (N/A); Hoffman Estates, IL
November 26, 2011*; 12:30 pm		vs. Prairie View A&M; Chicago Invitational Challenge Fourth Round	W 56–49	3–3	Sears Centre (N/A); Hoffman Estates, IL
December 1, 2011; 7:00 pm, ESPN3		Davidson	L 69–72	3–4 (0–1)	Benjamin Johnson Arena (1,412); Spartanburg, SC
December 3, 2011; 7:00 pm		The Citadel	W 82–63	4–4 (1–1)	Benjamin Johnson Arena (1,029); Spartanburg, SC
December 6, 2011*; 7:00 pm		Tulane	W 61–50	5–4	Benjamin Johnson Arena (1,019); Spartanburg, SC
December 10, 2011*; 7:00 pm		UVa-Wise	W 69–66	6–4	Benjamin Johnson Arena (630); Spartanburg, SC
December 18, 2011*; 3:00 pm		Jacksonville	W 63–57	7–4	Benjamin Johnson Arena (647); Spartanburg, SC
December 21, 2011*; 7:00 pm		at High Point	L 79–87	7–5	Millis Athletic Convocation Center (1,583); High Point, NC
December 28, 2011*; 7:00 pm, ESPN3		at South Carolina	L 45–57	7–6	Colonial Life Arena (8,152); Columbia, SC
January 2, 2012*; 7:00 pm, ESPN3		at Wake Forest	L 56–62	8–6	LJVM Coliseum (6,342); Winston-Salem, NC
January 5, 2012; 7:00 pm		College of Charleston	W 75–58	9–6 (2–1)	Benjamin Johnson Arena (2,387); Spartanburg, SC
January 7, 2012; 4:30 pm		at Western Carolina	L 57–67	9–7 (2–2)	Ramsey Center (2,257); Cullowhee, NC
January 12, 2012; 7:00 pm		at Chattanooga	L 48–51	9–8 (2–3)	McKenzie Arena (2,959); Chattanooga, TN
January 14, 2012; 7:00 pm		Georgia Southern	W 88–63	10–8 (3–3)	Benjamin Johnson Arena (1,755); Spartanburg, SC
January 19, 2012; 7:00 pm		Appalachian State	W 73–61	11–8 (4–3)	Benjamin Johnson Arena (1,322); Spartanburg, SC
January 21, 2012; 4:00 pm		at Furman	W 79–72	12–8 (5–3)	Timmons Arena (2,721); Greenville, SC
January 26, 2012; 7:00 pm		at The Citadel	W 62–55	13–8 (6–3)	McAlister Field House (1,223); Charleston, SC
January 28, 2012; 3:00 pm		at College of Charleston	W 68–59	14–8 (7–3)	TD Arena (4,151); Charleston, SC
January 30, 2012; 7:00 pm		Western Carolina	W 82–56	15–8 (8–3)	Benjamin Johnson Arena (1,655); Spartanburg, SC
February 4, 2012; 2:00 pm		Samford	W 66–61 ^{OT}	15–9 (8–4)	Benjamin Johnson Arena (2,012); Spartanburg, SC
February 6, 2012; 7:00 pm		at Davidson	L 54–76	15–10 (8–5)	John M. Belk Arena (3,864); Davidson, NC
February 9, 2012; 7:00 pm		at Georgia Southern	L 49–69	15–11 (8–6)	Hanner Fieldhouse (2,353); Statesboro, GA
February 11, 2012; 2:00 pm		at Appalachian State	W 66–64	16–11 (9–6)	Holmes Center (2,077); Boone, NC
February 15, 2012; 7:00 pm		Elon	W 72–59	17–11 (10–6)	Benjamin Johnson Arena (1,336); Spartanburg, SC
February 18, 2012*; 7:00 pm		at Charleston Southern; ESPN BracketBusters	L 59–77	17–12	CSU Field House (1,336); Charleston, SC
February 21, 2012; 7:00 pm		at UNC Greensboro	W 68–56	18–12 (11–6)	Greensboro Coliseum (3,345); Greensboro, NC
February 25, 2012; 7:00 pm		Furman	W 67–52	19–12 (12–6)	Benjamin Johnson Arena (3,500); Spartanburg, SC
SoCon tournament
March 3, 2012; 2:30 pm, ESPN3		vs. Western Carolina; Quarterfinals	L 59–82	19–13	U.S. Cellular Center (7,464); Asheville, NC
2012 CBI
March 14, 2012*; 7:00 pm		at Pittsburgh; First Roud	L 63–81	19–14	Petersen Events Center (1,449); Pittsburgh, PA
*Non-conference game. ^{#}Rankings from AP Poll. (#) Tournament seedings in parentheses. All times are in Eastern Time.

"Wofford Terriers Basketball 2011–12 Schedule". ESPN.com.
