= 2012 Southern Conference men's basketball tournament =

- Classification: Division I
- Season: 2011–12
- Teams: 12
- Site: U.S. Cellular Center; Asheville, North Carolina
- Champions: Davidson (11th title)
- Winning coach: Bob McKillop (6th title)
- MVP: De'Mon Brooks (Davidson)
- Television: SoConTV, ESPN2

2011–12 Southern Conference men's basketball standings
	Conf.				Overall
Team	W		L	PCT	W		L	PCT
North
UNC Greensboro	10	–	8	.556	13	–	19	.406
Elon	9	–	9	.500	15	–	16	.484
Samford	8	–	10	.444	11	–	19	.367
Western Carolina	8	–	10	.444	17	–	18	.486
Appalachian State	7	–	11	.389	13	–	18	.419
Chattanooga	5	–	13	.278	11	–	21	.344
South
Davidson†	16	–	2	.889	25	–	8	.758
Georgia Southern	12	–	6	.667	15	–	15	.500
Wofford	12	–	6	.667	19	–	14	.576
College of Charleston	10	–	8	.556	19	–	12	.613
Furman	8	–	10	.444	15	–	16	.484
The Citadel	3	–	15	.167	6	–	24	.200
† SoCon tournament winner As of March 15, 2012; Rankings from AP Poll

The 2012 Southern Conference men's basketball tournament took place between Friday, March 2 and Monday, March 5 in Asheville, North Carolina, at the U.S. Cellular Center. The semifinals were televised by SoConTV, with the Southern Conference Championship Game televised by ESPN2.

== Bracket ==
First round Friday, March 2
S4	College of Charleston	81
N5	Appalachian State	93
N3	Western Carolina	68
S6	The Citadel	56
N4	Samford	66
S5	Furman	75
S3	Georgia Southern	76
N6	Chattanooga	70

Quarterfinals; Saturday, March 3 ESPN3
N5	Appalachian State	55
N1	UNC Greensboro	65
S2	Wofford	59
N3	Western Carolina	82
S5	Furman	54
S1	Davidson	73
N2	Elon	65
S3	Georgia Southern	58

Semifinals; Sunday, March 4 ESPN3; SoCon Network
N1	UNC Greensboro	77
N3	Western Carolina	82
S1	Davidson	83
N2	Elon	67

Championship Game; Monday, March 5
N3	Western Carolina	91
S1	Davidson	93^{2OT}

== All-Tournament Team ==
First Team

Second Team
