= 2011–12 Southern Conference men's basketball season =

2011–12 Southern Conference Men's Basketball Season
- League: NCAA Division I
- Sport: Basketball
- Teams: 12
- TV partner: SoConTV

Tournament

Basketball seasons
- ← 10–11 2012–13 →

2011–12 Southern Conference men's basketball standings
	Conf.				Overall
Team	W		L	PCT	W		L	PCT
North
UNC Greensboro	10	–	8	.556	13	–	19	.406
Elon	9	–	9	.500	15	–	16	.484
Samford	8	–	10	.444	11	–	19	.367
Western Carolina	8	–	10	.444	17	–	18	.486
Appalachian State	7	–	11	.389	13	–	18	.419
Chattanooga	5	–	13	.278	11	–	21	.344
South
Davidson†	16	–	2	.889	25	–	8	.758
Georgia Southern	12	–	6	.667	15	–	15	.500
Wofford	12	–	6	.667	19	–	14	.576
College of Charleston	10	–	8	.556	19	–	12	.613
Furman	8	–	10	.444	15	–	16	.484
The Citadel	3	–	15	.167	6	–	24	.200
† SoCon tournament winner As of March 15, 2012; Rankings from AP Poll

== Preseason ==
The Southern Conference media picked Chattanooga and Davidson as division winners.

=== SoCon Preseason Poll ===
Rank	Team	Votes
North
1	Chattanooga (24)	172
2	Appalachian State (3)	136
3	Western Carolina (2)	123
4	UNC Greensboro (1)	90
5	Elon	76
6	Samford	36
South
1	Davidson (18)	165
2	College of Charleston (10)	156
3	Wofford (1)	105
4	Furman	80
5	Georgia Southern (1)	76
6	The Citadel	48

=== Preseason All-SoCon ===
- Keegan Bell, Chattanooga
- Omar Carter, Appalachian State
- Jake Cohen, Davidson
- JP Kuhlman, Davidson
- Willie Powers III, Georgia Southern
- Drew Spradlin, Elon
- Trey Sumler, Western Carolina
- Omar Wattad, Chattanooga
- Trent Wiedeman, College of Charleston
- Antwaine Wiggins, College of Charleston

Preseason Player of the Year

- Omar Carter, Appalachian State

== Rankings ==
Legend
	Improvement in ranking
	Drop in ranking
	Not ranked previous week
RV	Received votes but were not ranked in Top 25 of poll

		Pre	Wk 1	Wk 2	Wk 3	Wk 4	Wk 5	Wk 6	Wk 7	Wk 8	Wk 9	Wk 10	Wk 11	Wk 12	Wk 13	Wk 14	Wk 15	Wk 16	Wk 17	Wk 18	Final
North Division
Appalachian State	AP	-	-	-	-	-	-	-	-	-	-	-	-								
Appalachian State	C	-	-	-	-	-	-	-	-	-	-	-	-								
Appalachian State	Mid-Major	-	-	-	-	-	-	-	-	-	-	-	-								
Chattanooga	AP	-	-	-	-	-	-	-	-	-	-	-	-								
Chattanooga	C	-	-	-	-	-	-	-	-	-	-	-	-								
Chattanooga	Mid-Major	-	-	-	-	-	-	-	-	-	-	-	-								
Elon	AP	-	-	-	-	-	-	-	-	-	-	-	-								
Elon	C	-	-	-	-	-	-	-	-	-	-	-	-								
Elon	Mid-Major	-	-	RV	-	RV	RV	-	-	-	-	-	-								
Samford	AP	-	-	-	-	-	-	-	-	-	-	-	-								
Samford	C	-	-	-	-	-	-	-	-	-	-	-	-								
Samford	Mid-Major	-	-	-	-	-	-	-	-	-	-	-	-								
UNC-Greensboro	AP	-	-	-	-	-	-	-	-	-	-	-	-								
UNC-Greensboro	C	-	-	-	-	-	-	-	-	-	-	-	-								
UNC-Greensboro	Mid-Major	-	-	-	-	-	-	-	-	-	-	-	-								
Western Carolina	AP	-	-	-	-	-	-	-	-	-	-	-	-								
Western Carolina	C	-	-	-	-	-	-	-	-	-	-	-	-								
Western Carolina	Mid-Major	-	-	-	-	-	-	-	-	-	-	-	-								
South Division
The Citadel	AP	-	-	-	-	-	-	-	-	-	-	-	-								
The Citadel	C	-	-	-	-	-	-	-	-	-	-	-	-								
The Citadel	Mid-Major	-	-	-	-	-	-	-	-	-	-	-	-								
College of Charleston	AP	-	-	-	-	-	-	-	-	-	-	-	-								
College of Charleston	C	-	-	-	-	-	-	-	-	-	-	-	-								
College of Charleston	Mid-Major	RV	RV	21	23	19	17	13	13	16	18	22	RV								
Davidson	AP	-	-	-	-	-	-	-	-	-	-	-	-								
Davidson	C	-	-	-	-	-	-	-	-	-	-	-	-								
Davidson	Mid-Major	RV	RV	RV	RV	23	RV	RV	24	19	14	12	11								
Furman	AP	-	-	-	-	-	-	-	-	-	-	-	-								
Furman	C	-	-	-	-	-	-	-	-	-	-	-	-								
Furman	Mid-Major	-	-	-	-	-	-	-	-	-	-	-	-								
Georgia Southern	AP	-	-	-	-	-	-	-	-	-	-	-	-								
Georgia Southern	C	-	-	-	-	-	-	-	-	-	-	-	-								
Georgia Southern	Mid-Major	-	-	-	-	-	-	-	-	-	-	-	-								
Wofford	AP	-	-	-	-	-	-	-	-	-	-	-	-								
Wofford	C	-	-	-	-	-	-	-	-	-	-	-	-								
Wofford	Mid-Major	-	-	-	-	-	-	-	-	-	-	-	-								

== Awards ==
=== Player of the Month ===
Month	Name	School	Position	Class	Source
November	Mike Groselle	The Citadel	C	Jr.	"SoCon Announces November Athletes of the Month".
December	Antwaine Wiggins	College of Charleston	F	Sr.	"SoCon Announces December Athletes of the Month".

=== Player of the Week ===
Southern Conference Player of the Week award is for games through the day before the announcement.

Date	Name	School	Position	Class	Source
November 15	Mike Groselle	The Citadel	C	Jr.	SoCon Weekly Release
November 22	Antwaine Wiggins	College of Charleston	F	Sr.	SoCon Weekly Release
November 29	JP Kuhlman	Davidson	G	Jr.	SoCon Weekly Release
December 6	Jake Cohen	Davidson	F	Jr.	SoCon Weekly Release
December 13	Brad Loesing	Wofford	G	Sr.	SoCon Weekly Release
December 20	Nik Cochran	Davidson	G	Jr.	SoCon Weekly Release
January 3	Andre Williamson	Appalachian State	F	Sr.	SoCon Weekly Release
January 10	Jake Cohen	Davidson	F	Jr.	SoCon Weekly Release
January 17	Jake Cohen	Davidson	F	Jr.	SoCon Weekly Release
January 24	Derell Armstrong	UNC Greensboro	G	Jr.	SoCon Weekly Release
