= 2011–12 Tennessee Volunteers basketball team =

American college basketball season

2011–12 Tennessee Volunteers basketball

NIT, second round
- Conference: Southeastern Conference
- Record: 19–15 (10–6 SEC)
- Head coach: Cuonzo Martin (1st season)
- Assistant coaches: Tracy Webster; Jon Harris; Kent Williams
- Home arena: Thompson-Boling Arena

2011–12 Southeastern Conference men's basketball standings
	Conf.				Overall
Team	W		L	PCT	W		L	PCT
No. 1 Kentucky	16	–	0	1.000	38	–	2	.950
No. 25 Florida	10	–	6	.625	26	–	11	.703
No. 20 Vanderbilt †	10	–	6	.625	25	–	11	.694
Tennessee	10	–	6	.625	19	–	15	.559
Alabama	9	–	7	.563	21	–	12	.636
Mississippi State	8	–	8	.500	21	–	12	.636
Ole Miss	8	–	8	.500	20	–	14	.588
LSU	7	–	9	.438	18	–	15	.545
Arkansas	6	–	10	.375	18	–	14	.563
Auburn	5	–	11	.313	15	–	16	.484
Georgia	5	–	11	.313	15	–	17	.469
South Carolina	2	–	14	.125	10	–	21	.323
† 2012 SEC tournament winner As of April 2, 2012; Rankings from AP poll

The 2011–12 Tennessee Volunteers basketball team represented the University of Tennessee in the 2011–12 season. The team was a member of the Southeastern Conference and played its home games at Thompson-Boling Arena. This was the first season for Cuonzo Martin as the Volunteers' head coach. Martin left Missouri State to take over for former head coach Bruce Pearl who was fired on March 21, 2011 for lying to NCAA investigators about recruiting violations.

== Roster ==
=== Class of 2011 Signees ===
College recruiting information
Name	Hometown	School	Height	Weight	Commit date
Josh Richardson; SF	Edmond, Oklahoma	Edmond Santa Fe High School	6 ft 5 in (1.96 m)	185 lb (84 kg)	Apr 21, 2011
Josh Richardson; SF	Recruit ratings: Scout: Rivals: (90)				
Wes Washpun; PG	Cedar Rapids, Iowa	Washington High School	6 ft 1 in (1.85 m)	160 lb (73 kg)	Apr 14, 2011
Wes Washpun; PG	Recruit ratings: Scout: Rivals: (88)				
Quinton Chievous; SG	Niles, Illinois	Notre Dame High School	6 ft 6 in (1.98 m)	200 lb (91 kg)	May 11, 2011
Quinton Chievous; SG	Recruit ratings: Scout: Rivals: (84)				
Yemi Makanjuola; C	Raleigh, North Carolina	Word of God Christian Academy	6 ft 9 in (2.06 m)	230 lb (100 kg)	May 26, 2011
Yemi Makanjuola; C	Recruit ratings: Scout: Rivals: (80)				
Dwight Miller; PF	Bellaire, Texas	St. Pius X	6 ft 8 in (2.03 m)	220 lb (100 kg)	May 23, 2011
Dwight Miller; PF	Recruit ratings: Scout: Rivals: (JC)				
Overall recruit ranking: Scout: N/A Rivals: N/A
Note: In many cases, Scout, Rivals, 247Sports, On3, and ESPN may conflict in their listings of height and weight.; In these cases, the average was taken. ESPN grades are on a 100-point scale.; Sources: "Tennessee Basketball Commitments". Rivals.; "2011 Tennessee Basketball Commits". Scout.; "ESPN". ESPN.; "Scout.com Team Recruiting Rankings". Scout.; "2011 Team Ranking". Rivals.

2011–12 Tennessee Volunteers men's basketball team
Players
Coaches

Pos.	#	Name	Height	Weight	Year	Hometown
F	0	Yemi Makanjuola	6 ft 9 in (2.06 m)	244 lb (111 kg)	Fr	Lagos, Nigeria
G	1	Josh Richardson	6 ft 6 in (1.98 m)	186 lb (84 kg)	Fr	Edmond, OK
G	2	Galen Campbell	6 ft 3 in (1.91 m)	193 lb (88 kg)	Fr	Knoxville, TN
F	3	Renaldo Woolridge	6 ft 9 in (2.06 m)	212 lb (96 kg)	Sr	Sherman Oaks, CA
G	4	Wes Washpun	6 ft 1 in (1.85 m)	163 lb (74 kg)	Fr	Cedar Rapids, IA
F	5	Jarnell Stokes	6 ft 8 in (2.03 m)	250 lb (113 kg)	Fr	Memphis, TN
G	11	Trae Golden	6 ft 1 in (1.85 m)	209 lb (95 kg)	So	Powder Springs, GA
G	13	Skylar McBee	6 ft 3 in (1.91 m)	184 lb (83 kg)	Jr	Rutledge, TN
G	14	Tyler Summitt	6 ft 0 in (1.83 m)	175 lb (79 kg)	RS So	Knoxville, TN
F	15	Rob Murphy	6 ft 7 in (2.01 m)	232 lb (105 kg)	RS Jr	Brentwood, TN
F	20	Kenny Hall	6 ft 9 in (2.06 m)	222 lb (101 kg)	Jr	Stone Mountain, GA
G	21	Ryan Kilmartin	6 ft 5 in (1.96 m)	210 lb (95 kg)	RS So	Charlotte, NC
G	24	Brandon Lopez	6 ft 1 in (1.85 m)	179 lb (81 kg)	Fr	Knoxville, TN
G	23	Cameron Tatum	6 ft 7 in (2.01 m)	193 lb (88 kg)	RS Sr	Lithonia, GA
F	25	Dwight Miller	6 ft 8 in (2.03 m)	240 lb (109 kg)	RS Jr	Nassau, Bahamas
G	31	Quinton Chievous	6 ft 5 in (1.96 m)	201 lb (91 kg)	Fr	Chicago, IL
F	34	Jeronne Maymon	6 ft 7 in (2.01 m)	265 lb (120 kg)	RS Jr	Madison, WI
G	52	Jordan McRae	6 ft 5 in (1.96 m)	174 lb (79 kg)	So	Midway, GA

Head coach

- Cuonzo Martin (Purdue)

Assistant coach(es)

- Tracy Webster (Wisconsin)
- Jon Harris (Marquette)
- Kent Williams (Southern Illinois)

Legend

- (C) Team captain
- (S) Suspended
- (I) Ineligible
- (W) Walk-on
- Injured
- Current redshirt

== Schedule ==
Date time, TV	Rank^{#}	Opponent^{#}	Result	Record	Site city, state
Exhibition
November 3, 2011*; 7:30 p.m.		Carson–Newman	W 73–52		Thompson-Boling Arena; Knoxville, TN
November 7, 2011*; 7:00 p.m.		Lincoln Memorial	W 76–67		Thompson-Boling Arena; Knoxville, TN
Non-conference regular season
November 11, 2011*; 7:00 p.m., FSN		UNC Greensboro; Maui Invitational Tournament opening game	W 92–63	1–0	Thompson-Boling Arena; Knoxville, TN
November 16, 2011*; 7:00 p.m.		Louisiana-Monroe	W 85–62	2–0	Thompson-Boling Arena; Knoxville, TN
November 21, 2011*; 5:30 p.m., ESPN2		vs. No. 6 Duke; Maui Invitational Tournament	L 67–77	2–1	Lahaina Civic Center; Maui, HI
November 22, 2011*; 2:00 p.m., ESPN2		vs. No. 8 Memphis; Maui Invitational Tournament	L 97–99 ^{2OT}	2–2	Lahaina Civic Center; Maui, HI
November 23, 2011*; 2:30 p.m., ESPNU		vs. Chaminade; Maui Invitational Tournament 7th place game	W 86–60	3–2	Lahaina Civic Center; Maui, HI
November 28, 2011*; 9:00 p.m., ESPNU		at Oakland	L 81–89	3–3	Athletics Center O'rena; Rochester, MI
December 3, 2011*; 5:15 p.m., ESPN		Pittsburgh; SEC–Big East Challenge	L 56–61	3–4	Thompson-Boling Arena; Knoxville, TN
December 10, 2011*; 12:00 p.m., CSS		Austin Peay	L 70–74	3–5	Thompson-Boling Arena; Knoxville, TN
December 14, 2011*; 9:00 p.m., ESPN2		at College of Charleston	L 65–71	3–6	Carolina First Arena; Charleston, SC
December 20, 2011*; 7:00 p.m., SportSouth		UNC Asheville	W 72–68	4–6	Thompson-Boling Arena; Knoxville, TN
December 23, 2011*; 7:00 p.m.		East Tennessee State	W 66–63	5–6	Thompson-Boling Arena; Knoxville, TN
December 29, 2011*; 7:00 p.m., SportSouth		The Citadel	W 86–55	6–6	Thompson-Boling Arena; Knoxville, TN
January 2, 2012*; 7:00 p.m., SportSouth		Chattanooga	W 76–63	7–6	Thompson-Boling Arena; Knoxville, TN
January 4, 2012*; 8:00 p.m., FSN		at Memphis	L 51–69	7–7	FedEx Forum; Memphis, TN
SEC Regular Season
January 7, 2012; 11:00 a.m., ESPN2		No. 13 Florida	W 67–56	8–7 (1–0)	Thompson-Boling Arena; Knoxville, TN
January 12, 2012; 9:00 p.m., ESPN2		at No. 20 Mississippi State	L 58–62	8–8 (1–1)	Humphrey Coliseum; Starkville, MS
January 14, 2012; 12:00 p.m., ESPN		No. 2 Kentucky	L 62–65	8–9 (1–2)	Thompson-Boling Arena; Knoxville, TN
January 18, 2012; 8:00 p.m., SEC Network		at Georgia	L 53–57 ^{OT}	8–10 (1–3)	Stegeman Coliseum; Athens, GA
January 21, 2012*; 12:00 p.m., CBS		No. 11 Connecticut	W 60–57	9–10	Thompson-Boling Arena; Knoxville, TN
January 24, 2012; 7:00 p.m., ESPNU		at Vanderbilt	L 47–65	9–11 (1–4)	Memorial Gym; Nashville, TN
January 28, 2012; 6:00 p.m., ESPN2		Auburn	W 64–49	10–11 (2–4)	Thompson-Boling Arena; Knoxville, TN
January 31, 2012; 7:00 p.m., ESPNU		at No. 1 Kentucky	L 44–69	10–12 (2–5)	Rupp Arena; Lexington, KY
February 4, 2012; 8:00 p.m., ESPNU		Georgia	W 73–62	11–12 (3–5)	Thompson-Boling Arena; Knoxville, TN
February 8, 2012; 8:00 p.m., SEC Network		South Carolina	W 69–57	12–12 (4–5)	Thompson-Boling Arena; Knoxville, TN
February 11, 2012; 4:00 p.m., SEC Network		at No. 8 Florida	W 75–70	13–12 (5–5)	O'Connell Center; Gainesville, FL
February 15, 2012; 8:00 p.m., SEC Network		Arkansas	W 77–58	14–12 (6–5)	Thompson-Boling Arena; Knoxville, TN
February 18, 2012; 1:30 p.m., SEC Network		at Alabama	L 50–62	14–13 (6–6)	Coleman Coliseum; Tuscaloosa, AL
February 22, 2012; 7:00 p.m., CSS		Ole Miss	L 60–73	15–13 (7–6)	Thompson-Boling Arena; Knoxville, TN
February 25, 2012; 8:00 p.m., FSN		at South Carolina	W 73–64	16–13 (8–6)	Colonial Life Arena; Columbia, SC
February 29, 2012; 9:00 p.m., CSS		at LSU	W 74–69 ^{OT}	17–13 (9–6)	Maravich Assembly Center; Baton Rouge, LA
March 3, 2012; 4:00 p.m., ESPN		Vanderbilt	W 68–61	18–13 (10–6)	Thompson-Boling Arena; Knoxville, TN
2012 SEC tournament
March 9, 2012; 7:30 p.m., SEC Network	No. (2)	vs. (7) Ole Miss; Quarterfinals	L 72–77 ^{OT}	18–14	New Orleans Arena; New Orleans, LA
2012 NIT
March 13, 2012; 8:00 p.m., ESPNU	No. (1 TN)	(8 TN) Savannah State first round	W 65–51	19–14	Thompson-Boling Arena; Knoxville, TN
March 18, 2012; 7:00 p.m., ESPN	No. (1 TN)	(4 TN) Middle Tennessee second round	L 64–71	19–15	Thompson-Boling Arena; Knoxville, TN
*Non-Conference Game. Rankings from AP poll. All times are in Eastern Time. ( ) Tournament seedings in parentheses.
