= Alumni Gym (Elon University) =

Sports venue in Elon, North Carolina

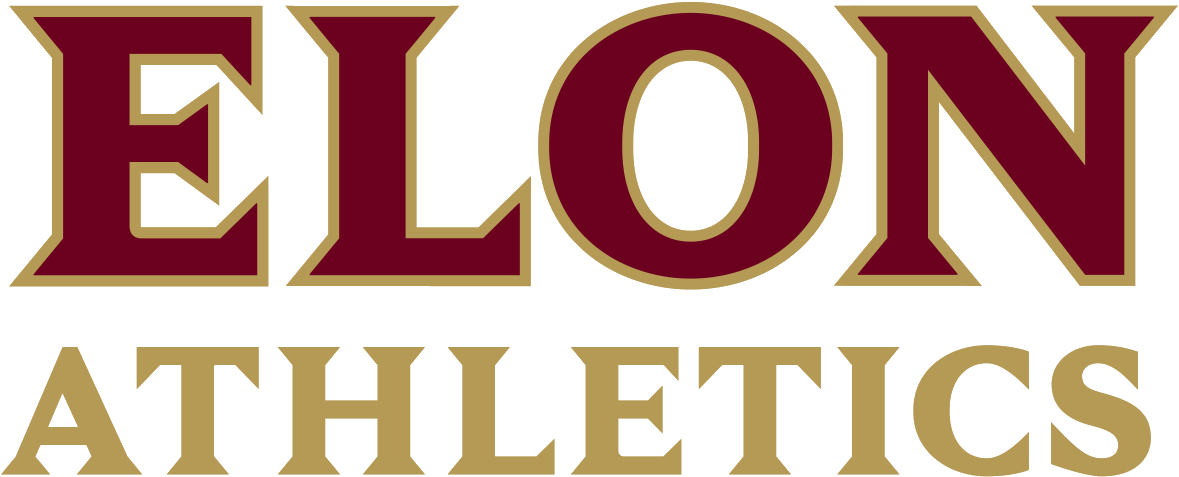

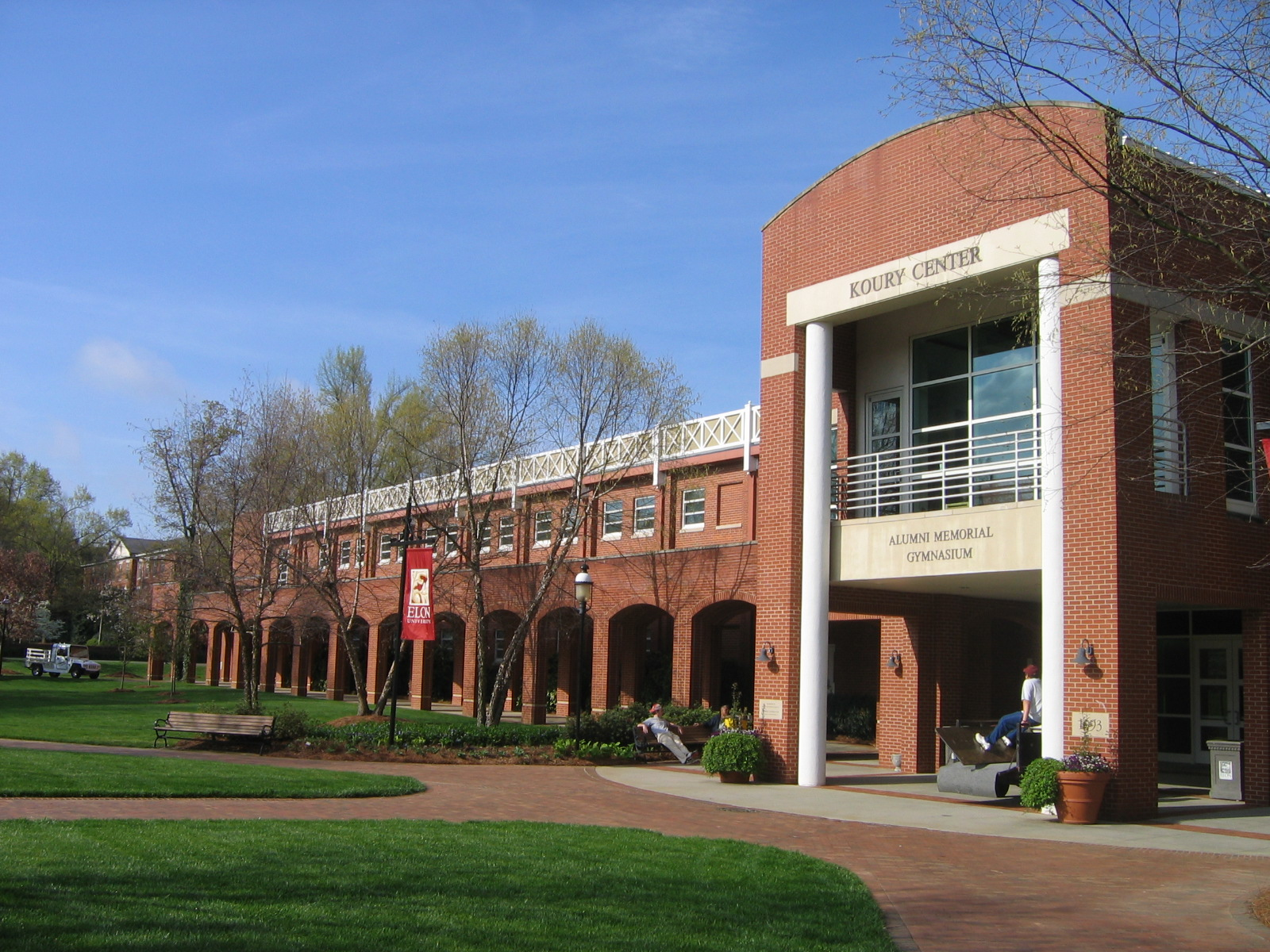
- Exterior view in 2008

- Location within North Carolina Location within the United States
- Interactive map of Alumni Gym
- Address: Elon, North Carolina
- Coordinates: 36.109018°N 79.506705°W
- Capacity: 1,607

Construction
- Built: 1949
- Opened: January 14, 1950; 76 years ago
- Renovated: 1992, 2010

Tenants
- Elon Phoenix men's basketball 1950–2018; Elon Phoenix women's basketball 1971–2018; Elon Phoenix women's volleyball 1970s–2018

Alumni Gym is a 1,607-seat multi-purpose arena in Elon, North Carolina, United States. It was built in 1949 and was home to the Elon University men's and women's basketball teams and the women's volleyball team through the 2017–18 school year.

The gym was renovated in 1992 to install air conditioning, new flooring, additional seating, offices, classrooms and renovated locker rooms and again in 2010 with the addition of stadium-style seating in a horseshoe shape, new scoreboards and video boards, new locker rooms, and a new entrance. The floor was renamed Robertson Court in thanks to a donor.

The 2017–18 school year was the last for Elon's teams at Alumni Gym. Elon opened the Schar Center, with a capacity of 5,100, for the 2018 volleyball season.

== Current use and future plans ==
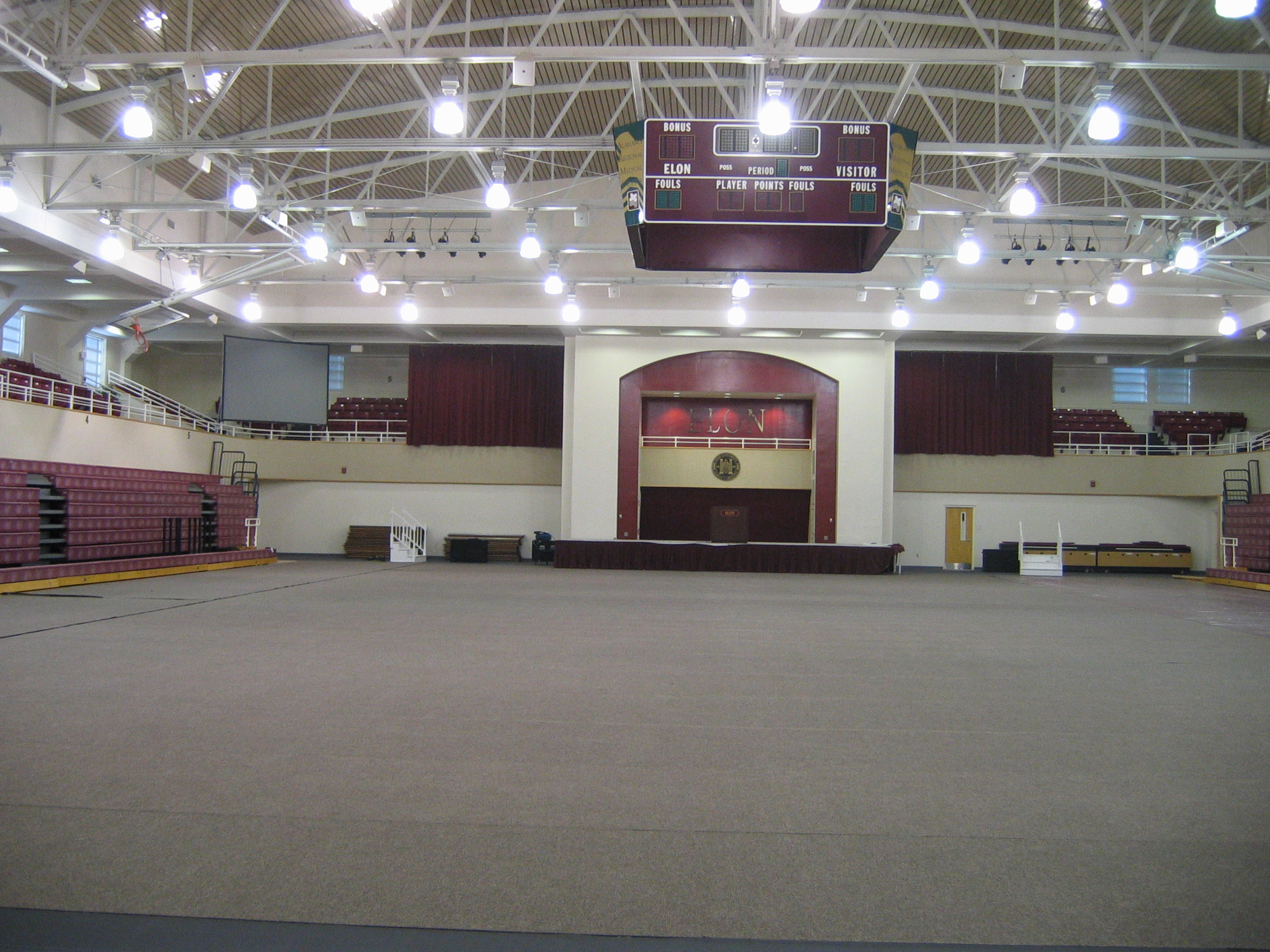
Interior view, c. 2008

During the months between the last Phoenix basketball games at Alumni Gym and the opening of the Schar Center, Alumni Gym hosted several university events, and was used for Elon's May 2018 commencement due to rain. As Schar Center was preparing to open, the basketball and volleyball teams moved their offices from the Koury Center, attached to Alumni Gym, to the new arena, and the athletic ticket office was also moved to the new arena.

Some of the vacated space became the new offices of the university's campus recreation department, which took control of the former gym space on June 1, 2018. The gym now serves as the home court for club basketball teams for both sexes, as well as the site of intramural championship games.

The former concession stands now serve as the university's outdoor recreation offices. Smaller university events continue to be held in the facility. According to Elon's campus recreation director, long-term plans call for the facility to become a campus wellness center, though no timetable had been set as of summer 2018.

== See also ==
- List of NCAA Division I basketball arenas
