= Benjamin Johnson Arena =

Multi-purpose sporting arena in Spartanburg, South Carolina

Coordinates: 34°57′37″N 81°55′58″W

Benjamin Johnson Arena is a 3,500-seat multi-purpose arena in Spartanburg, South Carolina, United States. It was built in 1981 and is currently used as a campus recreation and intramural sports facility for Wofford College. The arena had been home to the Wofford men's basketball, women's basketball, and women's volleyball teams from its opening through the 2016–17 school year, but all three teams moved to the newly built Jerry Richardson Indoor Stadium in the fall of 2017. The arena is named after the late Benjamin O. Johnson, former vice president of Spartan Mills and community leader in Spartanburg.

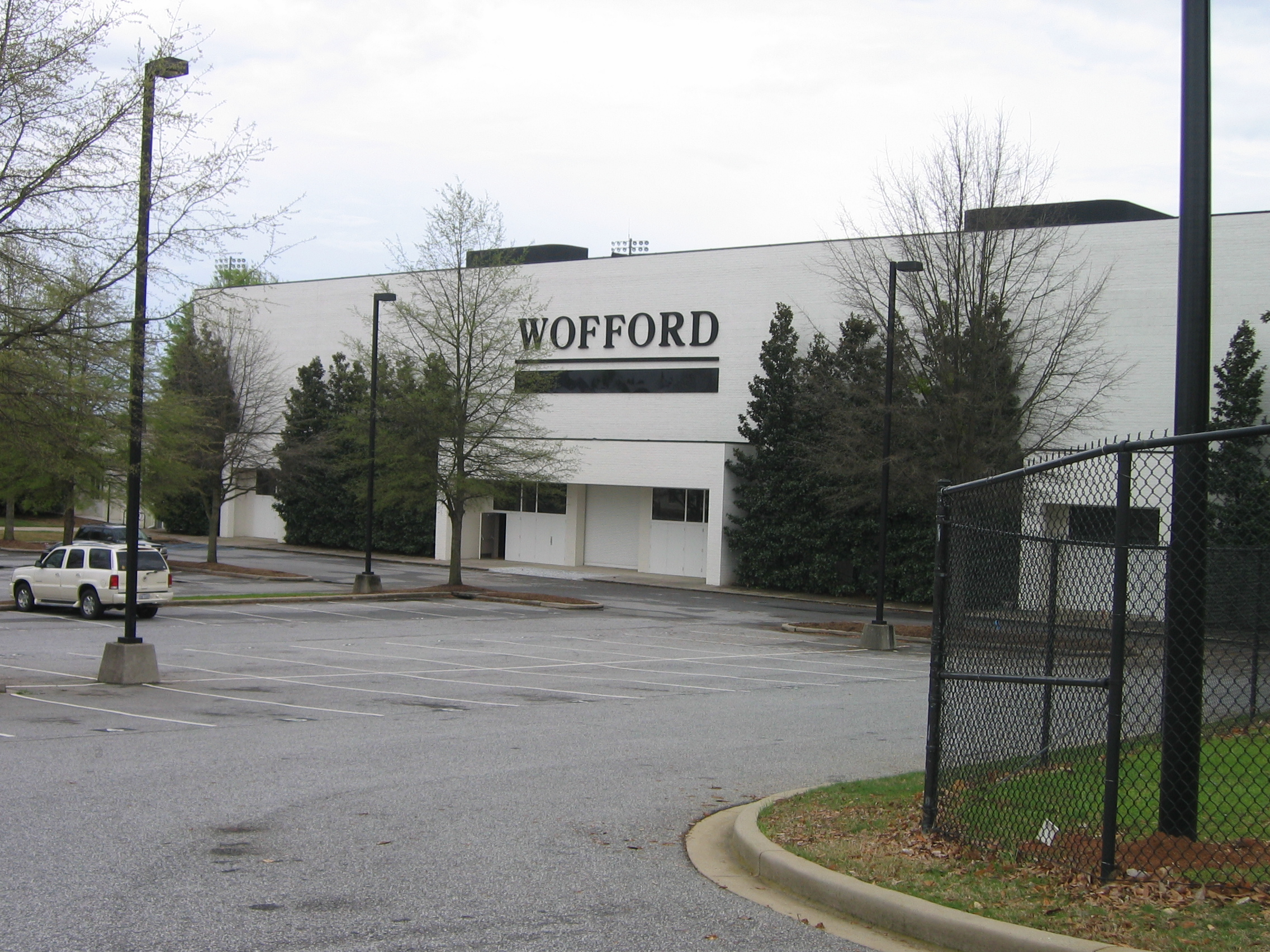
Exterior 2008

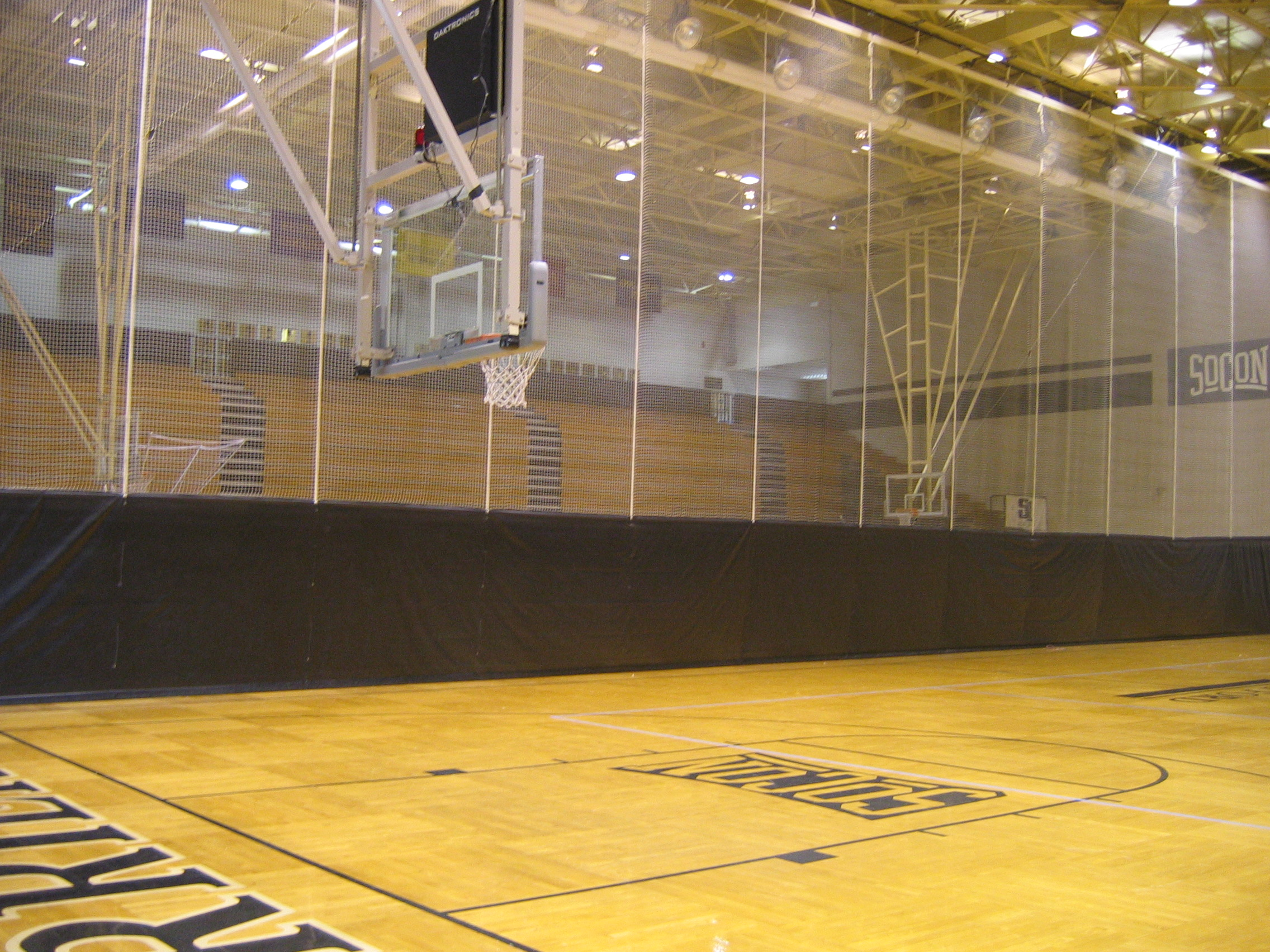
Interior 2008
