= USAC =

USAC may refer to:

- Unified Speech and Audio Coding, an audio compression scheme
- United States Army Cadet Corps, a non-profit youth education organization
- United States Auto Club, a sanctioning body for auto racing in the United States
- Universal Service Administrative Company, a not-for-profit corporation located in Washington, DC
- Universidad de San Carlos de Guatemala, a University in Guatemala City, Guatemala
- USA Cycling, or USAC, a governing body for bicycle racing in the United States
- USA Cricket, a governing body for the sport of cricket in the United States
- USA Climbing, a governing body for the sport of competition climbing in the United States
- Utah State Agricultural College, now known as Utah State University, a school in Logan, Utah, USA
