= Millersburg Military Institute =

Coordinates: 38°18′19″N 84°08′37″W

Location
- 1122 Main Street; Millersburg, Kentucky; United States

Information
- Type: Military boarding school Private
- Motto: Est Nulla Via Invia Virtute (There is No Way Except The Way of Virtue.)
- Established: 1893
- Founder: Col. C. M. Best
- Closed: 2014
- Grades: 7-12
- Campus: 18 acres (7.3 ha)
- Colors: Blue and gold
- Yearbook: Sniper
- Website: www.millersburgmilitary.com

Millersburg Military Institute (MMI) was a military boarding school founded in 1893 in Millersburg, Kentucky, about 30 miles (48 km) northeast of Lexington, Kentucky. It closed in 2014.

== History ==
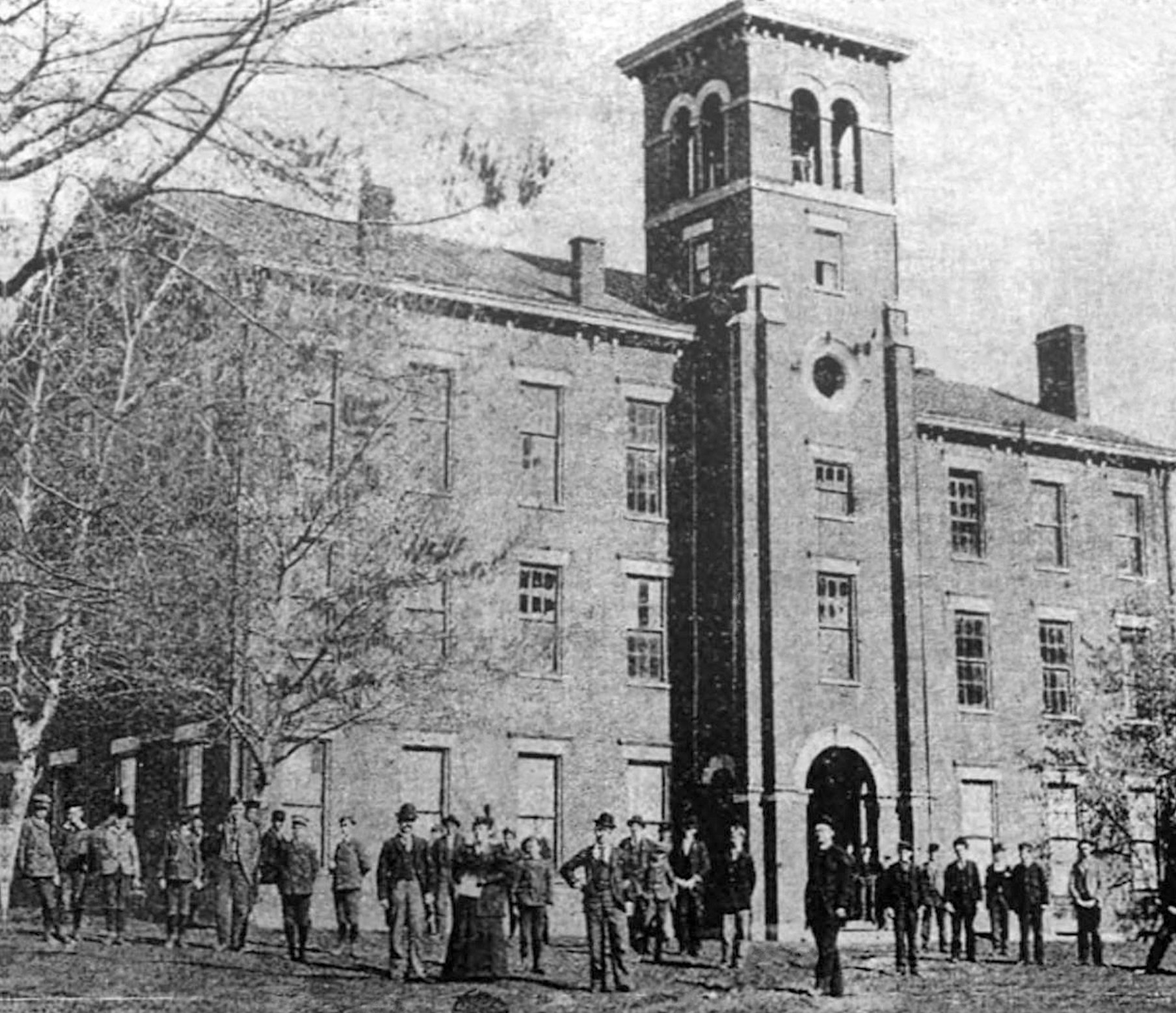
Former building in Millersburg from 1893 to 1920

Founded in 1893, it survived for over 113 years until closing in July 2006 due to a declining student population. The school had been temporarily closed in 2003, but was reopened by a rally of support from alumni and parents.

The campus sits on 18 acres (73,000 m^{2}) in north-central Kentucky, in the town of Millersburg, Bourbon County. The property is bounded to the northwest by KY-68, to the southeast by railroad tracks and open land, and to the north and south by residential properties. The school was founded in 1893 on the property of the former Kentucky Wesleyan College and moved to its current location in 1920. Upwards of 250 students were enrolled during the school's peak operating times; however, class sizes steadily declined through the early 2000s, resulting in the school's closure in 2006.

The U.S. Army Cadet Corps purchased the property in September 2008 and turned it into its national headquarters, as well as a National Cadet Training Center. The facility served again as a military boarding school as Forest Hill Military Academy starting in August 2012. In 2014, the U.S. Army Cadet Corps began a reorganization and closed the school.

It was announced in September 2015 that the grounds will once again be auctioned leaving the future of the school uncertain. The school filed for bankruptcy and stopped the sale and attempted the restructuring of its debt. However, the restructuring efforts were ultimately unsuccessful and Forest Hill Military Academy went back into bankruptcy and its campus was foreclosed in 2016.

== Notable alumni ==
- Wendell Berry (born 1934) – academic, cultural and economic critic, farmer and prolific author of novels, short stories, poems, and essays. He described it thus: "The highest aim was to produce a perfectly obedient, militarist, puritanical moron who could play football."
- Tom Boerwinkle (born 1945) – basketball player at the University of Tennessee and with the NBA Chicago Bulls (1968–1978)
- Jason Conley (born 1981) – attended for one postgraduate year before attending Virginia Military Institute; he would become the first freshman to lead NCAA Division I men's basketball in scoring
