= Jonathan Moore (basketball) =

American former basketball player (born 1957)

Personal information
- Born: November 7, 1957 (age 68) Charleston, South Carolina, U.S.
- Listed height: 6 ft 8 in (2.03 m)
- Listed weight: 210 lb (95 kg)

Career information
- High school: Burke (Charleston, South Carolina)
- College: Furman (1976–1980)
- NBA draft: 1980: 3rd round, 64th overall pick
- Drafted by: Detroit Pistons
- Position: Power forward

Career highlights
- 2× SoCon Player of the Year (1979, 1980); 4× First-team All-SoCon (1977–1980); 2× SoCon tournament MVP (1978, 1980); No. 25 retired by Furman Paladins
- Stats at Basketball Reference

Jonathan Moore (born November 3, 1957) is an American former basketball player who is best known for his collegiate career at Furman University between 1976 and 1980. A native of Charleston, South Carolina, Moore finished his career as one of the greatest players in Southern Conference history.

During his four-year tenure at Furman, Moore averaged 16.9 points per game, became one of only three players in conference history to be named First Team All-SoCon four times, was a two-time SoCon Basketball tournament MVP and was twice named the Southern Conference Men's Basketball Player of the Year. He scored 2,299 points and grabbed 1,242 rebounds, placing him on an exclusive list of NCAA Division I men's basketball players to achieve both of those milestones. Through the 2009–10 season, his rebounds total is sixth all-time in conference history, while his points total ranks eighth.

After his collegiate career ended, Moore was selected in the third round (64th overall) in the 1980 NBA draft by the Detroit Pistons. However, he never played a game in the league. Moore spent the first season out of college in Italy playing for Nuova Pallacanestro Vigevano with another Furman alumnus, Clyde Mayes. He was hoping to become more NBA-ready by playing a year of professional basketball abroad and then try to make the Pistons' roster for the 1980–81 season, but ultimately it never worked out. Moore played 14 seasons in Finland's Korisliiga from 1983 to 1998, and holds also a Finnish citizenship.

== See also ==
- List of NCAA Division I men's basketball players with 2000 points and 1000 rebounds
