= Hopewell High School (North Carolina) =

American public school in North Carolina

Location
- 11530 Beatties Ford Rd; Huntersville, North Carolina 28078; United States; 35°22′36″N 80°54′30″W

Information
- Type: Public
- Established: 2001 (25 years ago)
- School district: Charlotte-Mecklenburg Schools
- CEEB code: 341920
- Principal: James "Jim" Vanosdall
- Staff: 95.43 (FTE)
- Faculty: 115
- Enrollment: 1,774 (2023-2024)
- Student to teacher ratio: 18.59
- Colors: Carolina blue, navy blue, and silver
- Athletics: NCHSAA 7A
- Athletics conference: Greater Charlotte 7A/8A
- Mascot: Titans
- Website: hopewellhs.cmsk12.org

Hopewell High School is located in the northern part of Mecklenburg County, serving the western portion of Huntersville, and also serving some of the Northwest Charlotte area, in the U.S. state of North Carolina. The school was founded in 2001. The school's main rival is William A. Hough High School. Hopewell's athletic teams are nicknamed the Titans.

== Academics ==
Hopewell High School offers over 14 Advanced Placement courses, as well as honors and regular courses in a broad range of academic disciplines. Hopewell is also home to an Academy of Engineering, and an Academy of Hospitality and Tourism, both of which are four year programs run by Hopewell through partnerships with organizations in the applicable field.

== Athletics ==
Hopewell High School is a member of the North Carolina High School Athletic Association (NCHSAA) and is classified as a 7A school. It is a part of the Greater Charlotte 7A/8A Conference. The sports teams of Hopewell are:

- Baseball
- Basketball
- Cheerleading
- Cross country
- Flag football
- Football
- Golf
- Indoor track
- Soccer
- Softball
- Tennis
- Track and field
- Volleyball
- Wrestling

== Media appearances ==
Hopewell High School has been featured on TruTV's The Principal's Office.

== Notable alumni ==
- De'Mon Brooks, professional basketball player
- Brandyn Curry, professional basketball player
- Cameron Moore, singer/songwriter and Christian pop artist
- Lute, rapper
- Reneé Rapp, actress and singer (did not graduate from Hopewell)
- Brice Williams, college basketball player
