= Terry Boyd =

American former basketball player

Personal information
- Born: October 31, 1969 (age 57) Carrollton, Georgia, U.S.
- Listed height: 6 ft 3 in (1.91 m)

Career information
- High school: Randolph County (Wedowee, Alabama)
- College: Southern Union State CC (1988–1990); Western Carolina (1990–1992)
- NBA draft: 1992: undrafted
- Position: Guard

Career history
- 1992–1993: Wichita Falls Texans

Career highlights
- SoCon co-Player of the Year (1992); 2× First-team All-SoCon (1991, 1992)

Terry Boyd (born October 31, 1969) is an American former basketball player. He played for Western Carolina University from 1990–91 to 1991–92 and was the Southern Conference co-Player of the Year as a senior. That year, he led the Catamounts in scoring 22.8 points per game) and rebounding (5.8 per game). Boyd was also a two-time All-SoCon tournament Team in 1991 and 1992. Prior to Western Carolina, Boyd spent two seasons playing at Southern Union State Community College in Wadley, Alabama. Through 2012–13, Boyd still holds the Western Carolina record for three-pointers made per game in a season (3.35). His 23.32 points per game career average is third all-time in school history.

Although he went undrafted in the 1992 NBA draft following his collegiate career, Boyd did play professionally. He spent some time playing in Venezuela. He also played briefly in the Continental Basketball Association, averaging 7.7 points in nine games with the Wichita Falls Texans during the 1992–93 season.
