= Johnny Moates =

American basketball player (1944–2018)

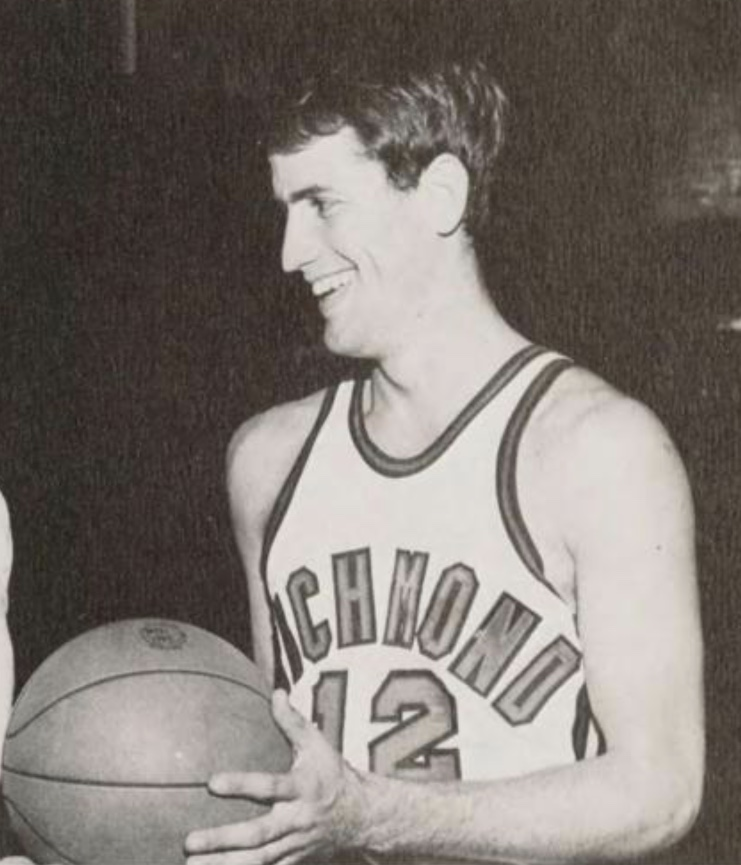
- Moates during his senior year at Richmond.

Personal information
- Born: November 28, 1944
- Died: July 9, 2018 (aged 73) Mechanicsville, Virginia, U.S.
- Listed height: 6 ft 1 in (1.85 m)

Career information
- High school: Benedictine (Richmond, Virginia)
- College: Richmond (1964–1967)
- NBA draft: 1967: 13th round, 138th overall pick
- Drafted by: Cincinnati Royals
- Position: Point guard

Career highlights
- SoCon Player of the Year (1967); 2× First-team All-SoCon (1966, 1967)
- Stats at Basketball Reference

John Michael Moates (November 28, 1944 – July 9, 2018) was an American basketball player best known for his collegiate career at the University of Richmond between 1964–65 and 1966–67. A native of Richmond, Virginia, the 6-foot-1-inch (185 cm) point guard played for the Spiders for three seasons, the last two of which he was a First Team All-Southern Conference selection. In his senior season of 1966–67, Moates averaged 25.0 points per game to lead the conference in scoring and was subsequently named the Southern Conference Player of the Year.

In the 1967 NBA draft, the Cincinnati Royals selected him in the third round (138th overall) but he never played in a game in the league, choosing instead to coach on the University of Richmond men's basketball staff for six seasons.

Moates became a businessman in his later life. He died on July 9, 2018, following a brief illness.
