= Dimeco Childress =

American former basketball player

Personal information
- Born: August 19, 1980 (age 46) Columbia, Tennessee, U.S.
- Listed height: 6 ft 3 in (1.91 m)
- Listed weight: 175 lb (79 kg)

Career information
- High school: Columbia Central (Columbia, Tennessee)
- College: East Tennessee State (1998–2002)
- NBA draft: 2002: undrafted
- Position: Shooting guard

Career highlights
- SoCon co-Player of the Year (2002); First-team All-SoCon (2002)

Dimeco Childress (born August 19, 1980) is an American former basketball player. He is known for his collegiate career at East Tennessee State University (ETSU) between 1998–99 and 2001–02. During his four years as a Buccaneer he scored 1,287 points and twice led the team in scoring. As a senior in 2001–02 he led the team 17.5 points per game and 75 total assists. On February 16, 2002 Childress scored a career-high 42 points, good enough for the third-highest single game output in ETSU history. That season, the Buccaneers went 11–5 in Southern Conference (SoCon) play, tying them for first place in the North Division. The SoCon coaches selected Childress as their player of the year; due to the conference's media choosing VMI's Jason Conley as their player of the year, the two players shared the award in 2001–02.

After his college career ended Childress did not get selected in the 2002 NBA draft.
