= Jake Cohen =

American-Israeli basketball player

Jake Cohen ג'ייק כהן
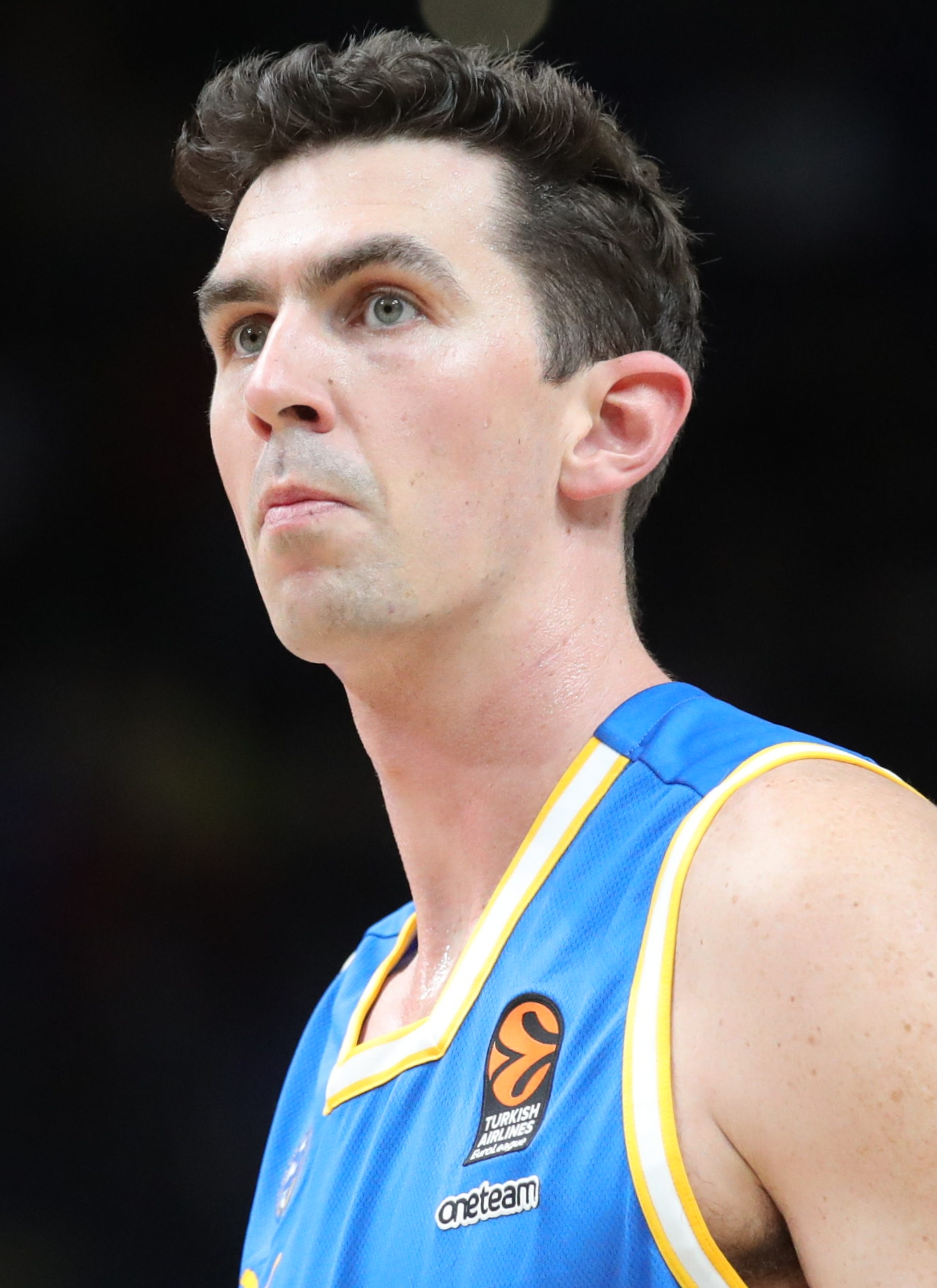
- Cohen with Maccabi Tel Aviv in 2022

Personal information
- Born: September 25, 1990 (age 36) Bryn Mawr, Pennsylvania, U.S.
- Listed height: 6 ft 11 in (2.11 m)
- Listed weight: 235 lb (107 kg)

Career information
- High school: Conestoga (Tredyffrin Township, Pennsylvania)
- College: Davidson (2009–2013)
- NBA draft: 2013: undrafted
- Playing career: 2013–2025
- Position: Power forward / center
- Number: 15

Career history
- 2013–2015: Maccabi Tel Aviv
- 2014: →Maccabi Rishon LeZion
- 2015–2016: Aris Thessaloniki
- 2016–2017: Maccabi Ashdod
- 2017–2020: Maccabi Tel Aviv
- 2020–2021: Obradoiro
- 2021–2025: Maccabi Tel Aviv

Career highlights
- 5× Israeli League champion (2018–2020, 2023, 2024); Israeli State Cup winner (2015, 2025); Israeli League Cup winner (2017); 2× SoCon Player of the Year – Media (2012, 2013); SoCon Player of the Year – Coaches (2013); 2× First-team All-SoCon (2012, 2013); SoCon Freshman of the Year (2010)
- Stats at Basketball Reference

Jacob Greer Cohen (Hebrew: ג'ייק כהן; born September 25, 1990) is an American-Israeli 6' 10 3/4" (2.10 m) tall former professional basketball player. He played nine seasons for Maccabi Tel Aviv of the Israeli Basketball Premier League and the EuroLeague. He has also represented the Israeli national team in international competitions.

Cohen played college basketball for the Davidson Wildcats, from 2009 through 2013. He was a two-time Southern Conference Player of the Year, as both a junior and senior. He finished his college career in the top 10 all-time in the conference in career defensive rebounds, offensive rebounds, free throw percentage, free throws, and blocks.

== Early life ==
Cohen is Jewish, and was born in Bryn Mawr, Pennsylvania, to David (who had played basketball at Haverford College) and Kate Cohen. Growing up he was a member of and attended Hebrew school at Temple Sholom in Broomall, where he had his Bar Mitzvah. His older brother, Josh, played football at Dartmouth College.

He was raised in Berwyn, Pennsylvania. By seventh grade, he was 6 ft 1 in (1.85 m).

== High school career ==
While a high school student, he played for the Philadelphia Jewish Community Center (JCC) team, which won a gold medal at the 2007 JCC Maccabi Games as he scored 33 points in the finals.

In high school, he played basketball at Conestoga High School in Tredyffrin Township, Pennsylvania. As a junior in 2008 he averaged 16 points and 12 rebounds per game, and was named All-Central League, All-Chester County, and Main Line Player of the Year.

As a senior in 2009 he averaged 17.6 points, 11 rebounds, and 5 blocked shots a game. He was named All-Main Line, Chester County Player of the Year, third-team Class AAAA All-State, Central League MVP, and was a McDonald's All-American nominee in 2009. He was a four-year Honor Roll student.

== College career ==
Cohen, a 6 ft 10 in (2.08 m) power forward, came to Davidson College in the 2009–10 season, and quickly joined the starting lineup of the Wildcats. He became the first freshman to lead Davidson in scoring since All-American Stephen Curry, averaging 13.3 points per game. He was named Southern Conference Freshman of the Year.

As a sophomore in the 2010–11 season, he averaged 12.2 points and 6.2 rebounds a game, ranked 2nd in the SoCon in blocked shots (and was 2nd in the Conference with 1.5 blocked shots per game) and 9th in rebounding and field-goal percentage, and was named a first-team All-American by the Jewish Sports Review.

As a junior in the 2011–12 season, Cohen scored 14.3 points (10th in the Conference) and grabbed 6.1 rebounds per game, led the Conference in free throws (141), blocked shots (55), and blocked shots per game (1.7), was 2nd in free throw percentage (.876), and was named Southern Conference Player of the Year by the league's media. In an unusual move, Cohen's teammate De'Mon Brooks was named player of the year by the league's coaches.

As a senior in the 2012–13 season, he averaged 14.9 points (6th in the Conference), 5.3 rebounds, and 1.6 blocks per game. He shot 39% from 3-point range, 50% from two-point range (5th in the Conference), and 83% from the free throw line (4th in the Conference), and had 128 free throws (2nd in the Conference) and 56 blocks (2nd in the Conference), 1.6 blocked shots per game (2nd in the Conference), and 508 points (3rd in the Conference). He was voted as SoCon Player of the Year by the league's head coaches and the media.

Cohen ended his college career as Davidson's all-time leader in blocks (197) and starts (123). He was also 2nd in free-throws made (451), 6th in points (1,795), 7th in field-goals made (611), 8th in free-throw percentage (.805), and 9th in rebounds (747). He was 2nd all-time in the Southern Conference in defensive rebounds (515), 5th in offensive rebounds (232), 7th in free throw percentage (.805) and free throws (451), and 8th in blocks (197).

== Professional career ==
Cohen went undrafted in the 2013 NBA draft. He was signed to the Phoenix Suns summer league team immediately following the draft, and played for it in July 2013.

He signed a four-year contract with Maccabi Tel Aviv in July 2013. In the 2013–14 season, he played 10 games for Maccabi Tel Aviv, and 14 games on loan for Maccabi Rishon Le Zion. He moved back to Maccabi Tel Aviv for the 2014–15 season.

On August 18, 2015, Cohen signed an annual contract with Greek team Aris.

On July 29, 2016, Cohen signed with Maccabi Ashdod for the 2016–17 season. On May 8, 2017, Cohen recorded a season-high 27 points, shooting 12-of-16 from the field, along with 6 rebounds and 6 assists in an 85–95 loss to Hapoel Gilboa Galil. In 32 games played during the 2016–17 season, Cohen averaged 13.2 points, 7.7 rebounds and 2.1 assists per game.

On June 27, 2017, Cohen returned to Maccabi Tel Aviv for a second stint, signing a two-year deal. Cohen helped Maccabi win the 2017 Israeli League Cup. On June 14, 2018, Cohen recorded 18 points, shooting 7-of-9 from the field, along with 5 rebounds and 4 steals in the championship game against Hapoel Holon and helped Maccabi win the 2018 Israeli League Championship after a 95–75 victory.

On May 27, 2019, Cohen recorded a season-high 21 points, shooting 8-of-11 from the field, along with three rebounds, four assists and two steals, in an 85–72 playoff win over Hapoel Tel Aviv. Cohen helped Maccabi win the 2019 Israeli League Championship, winning his second straight Israeli League title in the process.

On June 25, 2019, Cohen signed a one-year contract extension with Maccabi. On December 23, 2019, Cohen recorded a double-double with a career-high 33 points and 14 rebounds, while shooting 14-of-22 from the field, in a 112–110 double overtime win over Hapoel Gilboa Galil. He was subsequently named Israeli League Round 11 MVP. On January 2, 2019, Cohen was named Israeli League Player of the Month for games played in December.

Cohen signed with Obradoiro CAB of the Liga ACB on July 29, 2020. On October 8, he was named the top Israeli playing abroad for the week after posting 13 points against Bilbao Basket.

On July 5, 2021, he signed with Maccabi Tel Aviv of the Israeli Basketball Premier League.

== International career ==
Cohen, who was granted Israeli citizenship on the basis of his being Jewish, represented Israel in the FIBA Europe Under-20 Championship Division B in Austria in 2010. He led the tournament in scoring at 20 ppg, led all players in the tournament with 87% free throw shooting, led all players in fouls drawn per game (6.4), and was named to the all-tournament team.

He was on the Team USA roster for the 2013 Maccabiah Games, but did not play because he instead was playing in the NBA summer league in an effort to be picked by an NBA team.

Cohen was a member of the senior men's Israeli national basketball team. On November 24, 2017, he made his first appearance for the senior team at the 2019 FIBA Basketball World Cup qualification match against Estonia, recording 10 points, 7 rebounds and 3 assists.

== Career statistics ==
Legend
GP	Games played	GS	Games started	MPG	Minutes per game
FG%	Field-goal percentage	3P%	3-point field-goal percentage	FT%	Free-throw percentage
RPG	Rebounds per game	APG	Assists per game	SPG	Steals per game
BPG	Blocks per game	PPG	Points per game	PIR	Performance index rating
**Bold**	Career high

=== EuroLeague ===
†	Denotes seasons in which Cohen won the EuroLeague

Year	Team	GP	GS	MPG	FG%	3P%	FT%	RPG	APG	SPG	BPG	PPG	PIR
2013–14†	Maccabi Tel Aviv	4	0	3.8	.200	—	—	.3	.3	.3	—	0.5	-0.3
2014–15	Maccabi Tel Aviv	15	2	5.7	.471	.286	.800	1.1	.3	.2	.1	1.5	1.5
2017–18	Maccabi Tel Aviv	19	0	7.6	.452	**.500**	.778	1.6	.2	.1	—	2.1	2.2
2018–19	Maccabi Tel Aviv	25	0	8.7	.450	.400	.786	1.1	.6	.2	—	2.9	2.4
2019–20	Maccabi Tel Aviv	24	3	13.3	**.531**	.452	.684	2.0	1.0	.5	.1	**5.4**	**5.2**
2021–22	Maccabi Tel Aviv	13	2	**24.6**	**.531**	.452	.684	**3.8**	**1.8**	**1.0**	**.2**	2.2	1.9
2022–23	Maccabi Tel Aviv	27	17	12.2	.439	.265	.813	1.8	1.1	.2	.0	3.0	3.1
2023–24	Maccabi Tel Aviv	**36**	**31**	10.3	.467	.378	**1.000**	1.2	.9	.2	.0	3.0	2.1
Career		163	55	9.7	.468	.387	.771	1.4	.7	.3	.0	2.9	2.6

=== EuroCup ===
Year	Team	GP	GS	MPG	FG%	3P%	FT%	RPG	APG	SPG	BPG	PPG	PIR
2015–16	Aris Thessaloniki	16	0	14.3	.468	.357	.771	3.2	.4	.6	.5	6.8	6.8
Career		16	0	14.3	.468	.357	.771	3.2	.4	.6	.5	6.8	6.8

=== Domestic leagues ===
Year	Team	League	GP	MPG	FG%	3P%	FT%	RPG	APG	SPG	BPG	PPG
2013–14	(Israel) Maccabi Tel Aviv	Ligat HaAl	10	8.4	.565	.286	.700	1.2	.1	.3	.1	3.5
2013–14	(Israel) Maccabi Rishon L.Z.	Ligat HaAl	14	21.7	.469	.250	.780	5.0	1.1	.6	.6	10.9
2014–15	(Israel) Maccabi Tel Aviv	Ligat HaAl	40	18.1	.471	.405	.888	4.2	.9	.5	.5	7.8
2015–16	(Greece) Aris Thessaloniki	HEBA A1	36	14.3	.389	.269	.734	3.4	.6	.4	.4	5.7
2016–17	(Israel) Maccabi Ashdod	Ligat HaAl	32	30.0	.519	.299	.829	7.7	2.1	.9	.6	13.2
2017–18	(Israel) Maccabi Tel Aviv	Ligat HaAl	39	19.3	.542	.406	.849	4.8	1.5	.6	.4	9.5
2018–19	(Israel) Maccabi Tel Aviv	Ligat HaAl	38	17.7	.586	.407	.893	4.2	2.0	.7	.3	8.0
2019–20	(Israel) Maccabi Tel Aviv	Ligat HaAl	32	21.5	.525	.382	.862	4.7	2.1	.5	.2	10.2
2020–21	(Spain) Obradoiro	ACB	35	21.7	.447	.330	.855	3.8	1.2	.5	.3	8.2
2021–22	(Israel) Maccabi Tel Aviv	Ligat HaAl	33	16.3	.537	.431	.771	3.5	1.4	.3	.1	6.7
2022–23	(Israel) Maccabi Tel Aviv	Ligat HaAl	35	16.8	.542	.448	.864	3.2	1.9	.3	.3	7.1
2023–24	(Israel) Maccabi Tel Aviv	Ligat HaAl	37	17.3	.540	.354	.896	3.8	2.0	.4	.3	5.2

=== College ===
Year	Team	GP	GS	MPG	FG%	3P%	FT%	RPG	APG	SPG	BPG	PPG
2009–10	Davidson	31	23	22.7	.466	.311	.709	5.1	.8	.5	1.2	13.3
2010–11	Davidson	33	33	23.2	.489	.333	.773	**6.2**	.8	.5	1.5	12.2
2011–12	Davidson	33	32	24.8	.487	.366	**.876**	6.1	1.4	**.7**	**1.7**	14.3
2012–13	Davidson	**34**	**34**	**25.6**	**.497**	**.388**	.831	5.3	**1.5**	**.7**	1.6	**14.9**
Career		131	122	24.1	.485	.351	.805	5.7	1.1	.6	1.5	13.7
