= De'Mon Brooks =

American basketball player

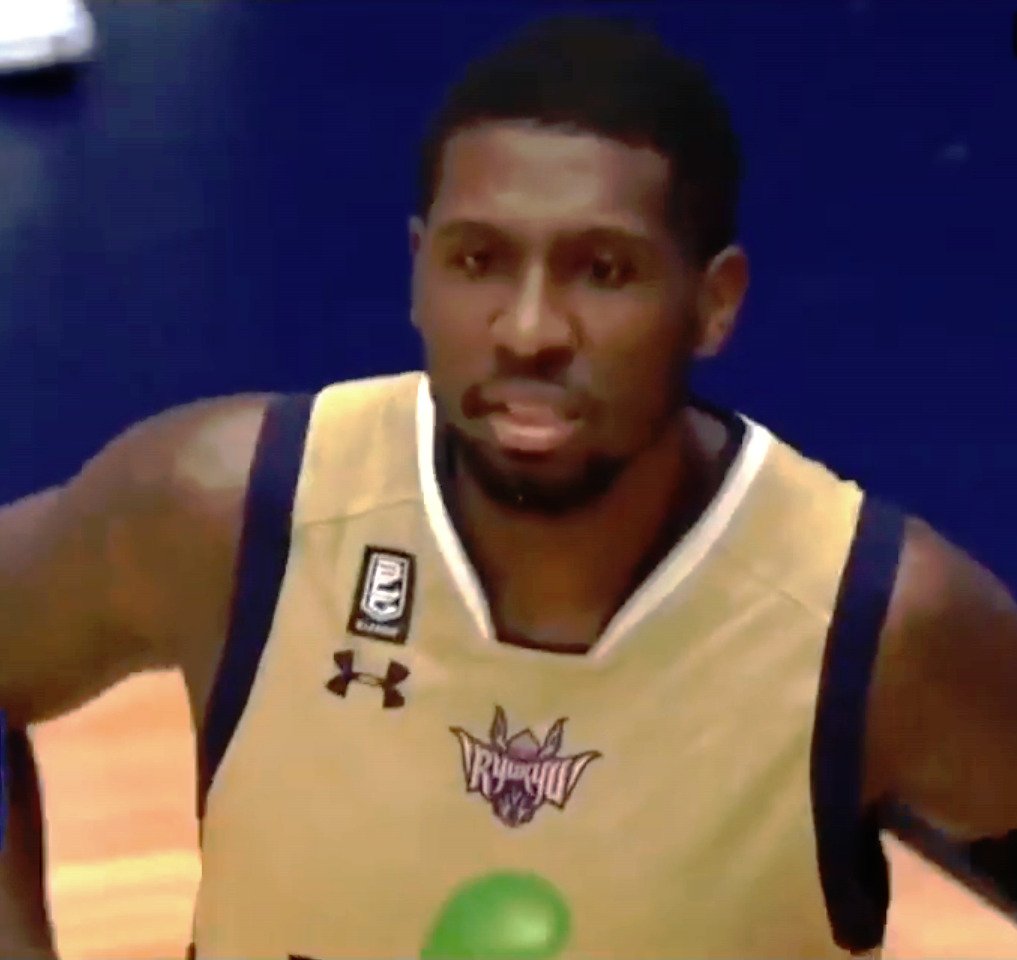

No. 4 – TSG GhostHawks
- Position: Power forward
- League: P. League+

Personal information
- Born: May 28, 1992 (age 34) Charlotte, North Carolina, U.S.
- Listed height: 6 ft 7 in (2.01 m)
- Listed weight: 230 lb (104 kg)

Career information
- High school: Hopewell (Huntersville, North Carolina)
- College: Davidson (2010–2014)
- NBA draft: 2014: undrafted
- Playing career: 2014–present

Career history
- 2014–2015: Azzurro Napoli
- 2015: Hapoel Gilboa Galil
- 2015–2016: Orsi Derthona
- 2016–2019: Medi Bayreuth
- 2019–2020: Ryukyu Golden Kings
- 2020–2021: Shimane Susanoo Magic
- 2021–2024: Levanga Hokkaido
- 2024–present: TSG GhostHawks

Career highlights
- 2× SoCon Player of the Year – Coaches (2012, 2014); SoCon Player of the Year – Media (2014); 2× AP Honorable Mention All-American (2012, 2014); 3× First-team All-SoCon (2012–2014)

De'Mon Brooks (born May 28, 1992) is an American basketball player for TSG GhostHawks of the Taiwanese P. League+. He completed his college career at Davidson College after the 2013–14 season. In the 2011–12 NCAA Division I men's basketball season, he was named Southern Conference player of the year and an All-American by the Associated Press.

== High school career ==
Brooks, a 6'7" forward born in the U. S. state of Georgia, played high school basketball at Hopewell High School in Huntersville, North Carolina. As a senior, he averaged 20 points and 10.2 rebounds per game for his school.

== College career ==
He committed to coach Bob McKillop at Davidson and started his college career in the 2010–11 season. That year, he averaged 9.0 points and 5.1 rebounds per game and was named a freshman All-American by Collegeinsider.com. As a sophomore, Brooks increased his output to 15.7 points and 6.2 rebounds and led the team to regular season and tournament championships in the Southern Conference.

In the 2012 Southern Conference tournament, Brooks scored 19 points in the Wildcats' double overtime championship game win and was named tournament MVP. At the conclusion of the season, Brooks was named Southern Conference Player of the Year by the league's coaches (his teammate, Jake Cohen won the same award from the league's media – the first time two players from the same school split the honor). He was also named an honorable mention by the Associated Press.

Brooks returned to Davidson for his junior year in 2012–13 and was named the preseason conference player of the year. In four season with the Wildcats, Brooks appeared in 125 games averaging 14.2 points per game and 6.1 rebounds per game.

== Professional career ==
On July 2, 2014, Brooks was named to the Charlotte Hornets summer league team. On July 11 he signed with Azzurro Napoli in Italy.

On February 11, 2015, he signed with Hapoel Gilboa Galil of the Israeli Basketball Premier League. Brooks played for Medi Bayreuth from 2016 to 2019. He averaged 12.2 points and 5 rebounds per game during the 2018–19 season. Brooks parted ways with the team on May 28, 2019. He spent the 2019–20 season with Ryukyu Golden Kings in Japan, averaging 16.9 points, 5.2 rebounds and 2 assists per game. On June 25, 2020, Brooks signed with Shimane Susanoo Magic.

On August 6, 2024, he signed with TSG GhostHawks of the P. League+.
