= Jason Conley =

American professional basketball player

Personal information
- Born: July 21, 1981 (age 45) San Antonio, Texas, U.S.
- Listed height: 6 ft 5 in (1.96 m)
- Listed weight: 210 lb (95 kg)

Career information
- High school: Montrose Christian (Rockville, Maryland); Millersburg Military Institute (Millersburg, Kentucky)
- College: VMI (2001–2002); Missouri (2003–2005)
- NBA draft: 2005: undrafted
- Playing career: 2005–2017
- Position: Shooting guard / small forward

Career history
- 2005–2008: Telekom Baskets Bonn
- 2009: Porvoon Tarmo
- 2009: Namika Lahti
- 2009–2010: WBC Wels
- 2010–2011: Timișoara
- 2011: Kataja
- 2012–2013: Lappeenrannan NMKY
- 2014–2015: Kouvot
- 2015–2017: Helsinki Seagulls

Career highlights
- Austrian A Bundesliga All-Star (2010); German Bundesliga All-Star (2008); NCAA scoring champion (2002); SoCon co-Player of the Year (2002); First-team All-SoCon (2002); Big 12 All-Newcomer Team (2004); SoCon Rookie of the Year (2002); SoCon All-Freshman team (2002)

Jason Conley (born July 21, 1981) is an American former professional basketball player. A 6 ft 5 in (1.96 m) shooting guard and small forward, Conley is best known for being the first freshman to ever lead NCAA Division I in scoring.

== Early life ==
Jason Conley was born in San Antonio, Texas, and attended Montrose Christian School in Rockville, a perennial national high school basketball power that has sent many players to the Division I and professional levels. He did not catch many college basketball recruiters' attention, but Virginia Military Institute, a small Division I university located in Lexington, Virginia offered him a scholarship.

== College ==
=== VMI ===
Conley is dyslexic and failed to attain the minimum SAT entrance exam score to be eligible to play college basketball immediately after high school. To try to help him qualify, he spent one year at a postgraduate school called Millersburg (Ky.) Military Institute, but Conley still fell short of his SAT requirement. As a partial qualifier, he sat out one year at VMI but did not lose a year of eligibility.

When Conley's college basketball career finally started in 2001, two full years after his high school graduation in 1999, he burst onto the national scene. As a freshman, Conley started all 28 games, averaged 29.3 points, 8.0 rebounds and 2.9 steals per game while shooting 46.7% from the field and 81.8% from the free throw line. He had some of his best games against top-tier competition: 24 points against Kentucky, 25 against Virginia and even 38 against Villanova.

When the 2001–02 season had come to a close, Conley's 29.3 ppg average made him the first freshman ever to win the national scoring title. He was named the Co-Southern Conference Player of the Year with Dimeco Childress of East Tennessee.

Conley followed up an historical freshman campaign at VMI with a sophomore season that saw him transfer to Missouri after the first semester had ended. At the time, Conley played in 10 games and was averaging 22.2 ppg with VMI. Since he transferred midway through an academic year, he only had to sit out the spring semester at Missouri before he was eligible to suit up for the Tigers the following year.

=== Missouri ===
As a junior in 2003–04, Conley was selected to the Big 12 Conference All-Newcomer and All-Reserve Teams. He averaged 7.6 points and 3.4 rebounds in 18.2 minutes per game, and scored a season-high 24 points in a win over Baylor. As a senior in 2004–05, Conley's role on Missouri increased as he averaged 10.2 points and 5.9 rebounds in a career-high 33 games played. Although neither of his seasons at Missouri matched what he accomplished at Virginia Military Institute, he still finished his college basketball career with 1,567 points and 557 rebounds.

== Professional ==
The closest Conley came to making a National Basketball Association (NBA) roster was participating for the Atlanta Hawks' summer league team in 2005. He was signed to play for Germany's Telekom Baskets Bonn in 2005, a team he stayed with through 2007–08. He followed this with one-month stints for Finland's Porvoon Tarmo (February 2009) and Namika Lahti (March 2009). In 2009–10, Conley signed with WBC Kraftwerk Wels of the Austrian A Bundesliga.
