= Southern Conference Men's Basketball Player of the Year =

American college basketball award

- Awarded for: the most outstanding basketball player in the Southern Conference
- Country: United States

History
- First award: 1952
- Most recent: Jadin Booth, Samford

The Southern Conference Men's Basketball Player of the Year is an award given to the Southern Conference's (SoCon) most outstanding player. The award was first given following the 1951–52 season. Fred Hetzel of Davidson is the only player to have won the award three times (1963–1965). Sixteen other players have won the award twice, most recently Isaiah Miller of UNC Greensboro (2020, 2021).

Davidson and Furman have the most all-time winners with 13, but Davidson left the SoCon after the 2013–14 season to join the Atlantic 10 Conference. There have also been nine ties in the award's history, but only one (1970–71 season) which occurred prior to the 1989–90 season. That season was the first for two separate player of the year awards—one by the Southern Conference men's basketball coaches, and the other by conference media members. When both the coaches and media select the same player, he is the consensus conference player of the year. The only current members that have never had a winner are Mercer and Tennessee Tech, the latter of which is playing its first SoCon season in 2026–27.

== Key ==
†	Co-Players of the Year
*	Awarded a national player of the year award that same season: Helms Foundation College Basketball Player of the Year (1904–05 to 1978–79); UPI College Basketball Player of the Year (1954–55 to 1995–96); Oscar Robertson Trophy (1958–59 to present); Naismith College Player of the Year (1968–69 to present); John R. Wooden Award (1976–77 to present)
C	SoCon coaches' selection (1990–2024)
M	SoCon media's selection (1990–2024)
Player (X)	Denotes the number of times the player has been awarded the SoCon Player of the Year award at that point

== Winners ==
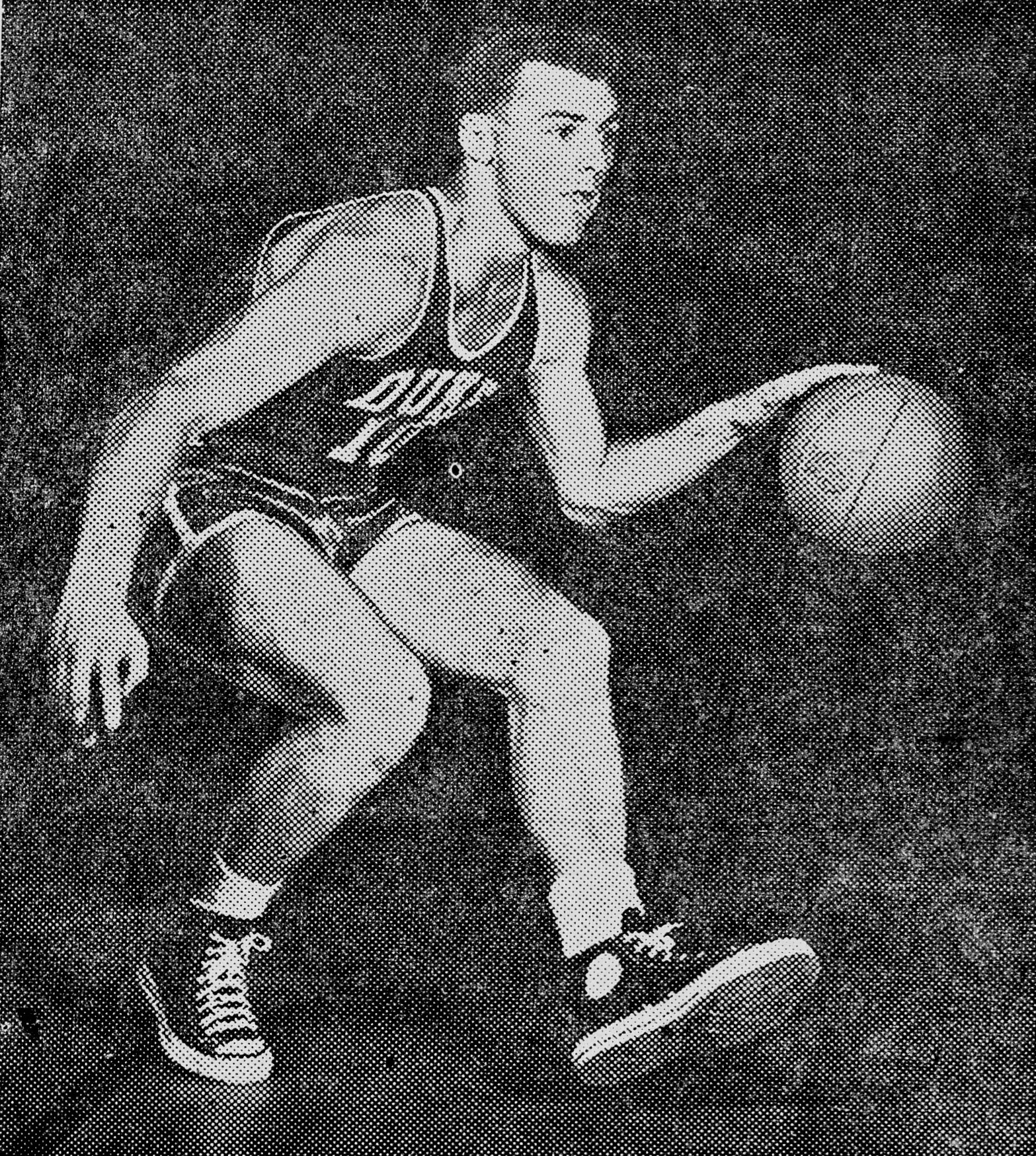
Dick Groat, Duke, 1952

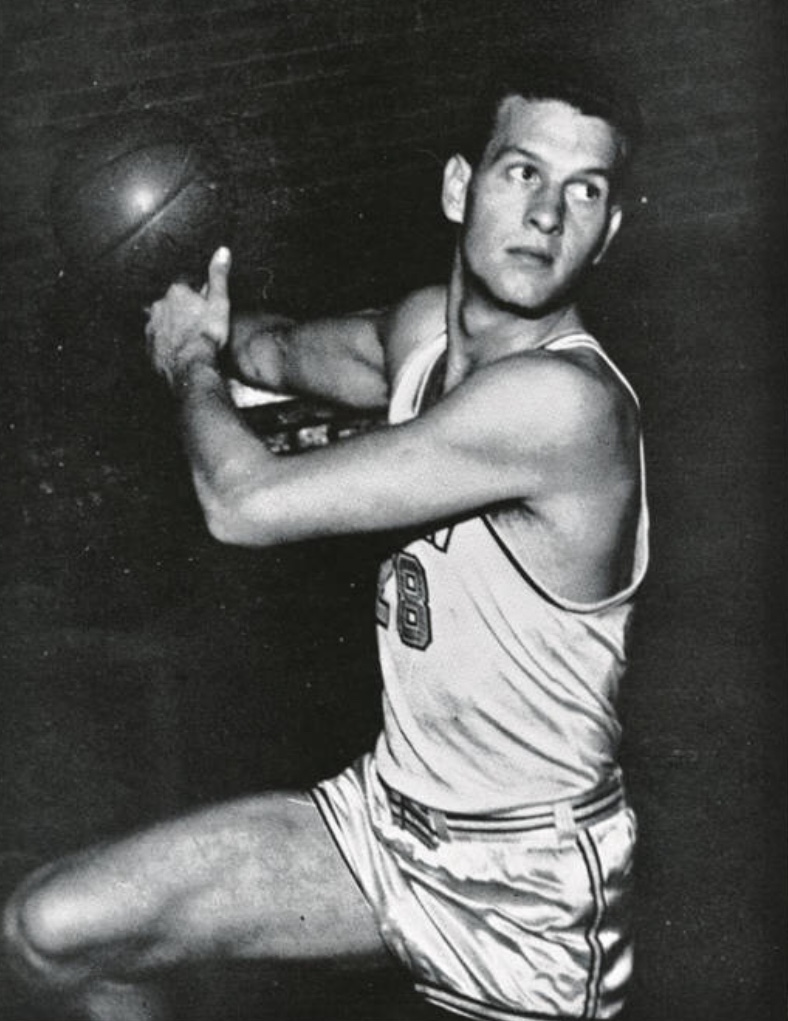
Frank Selvy, Furman, 1953 and 1954

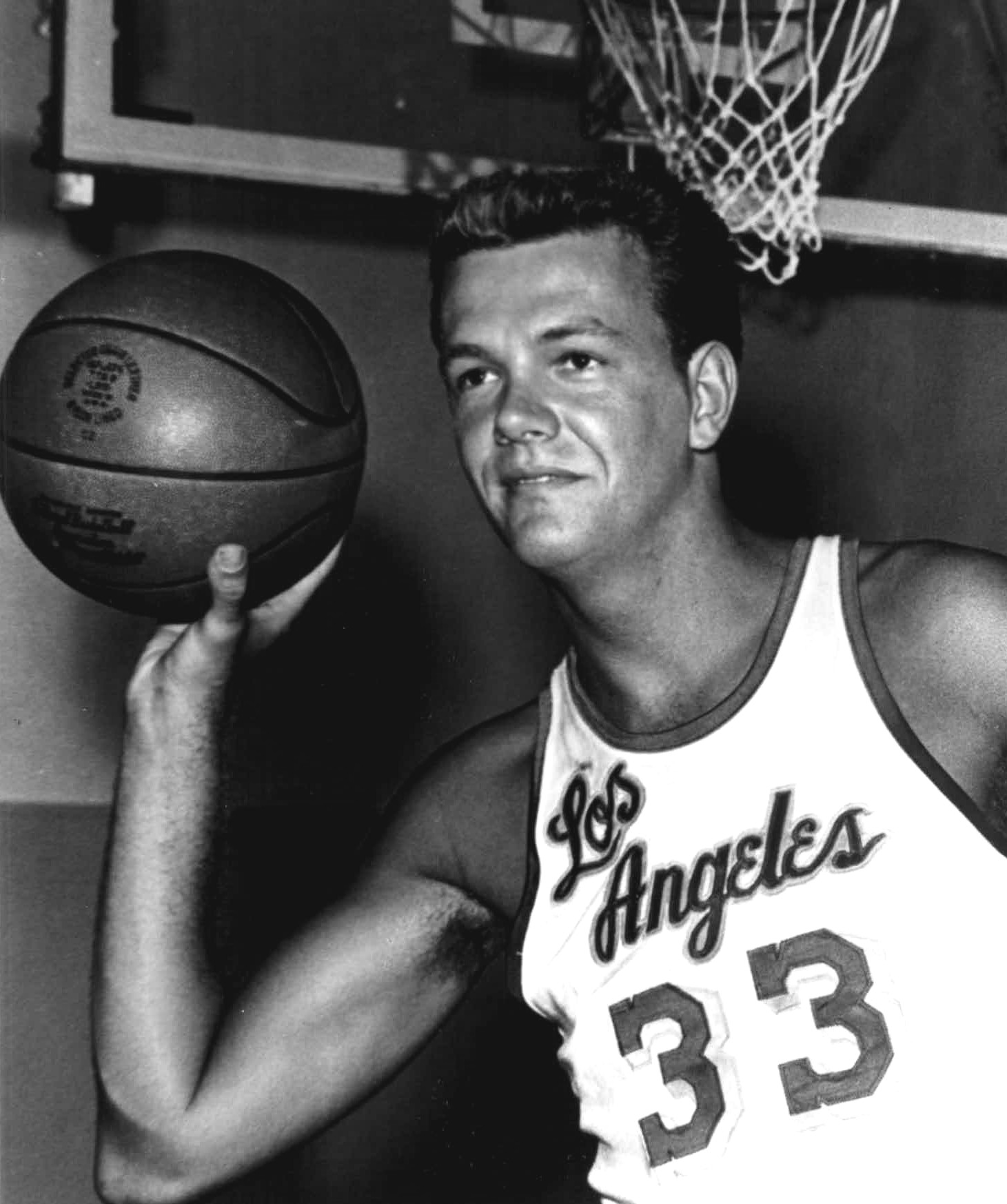
Hot Rod Hundley, West Virginia, 1957

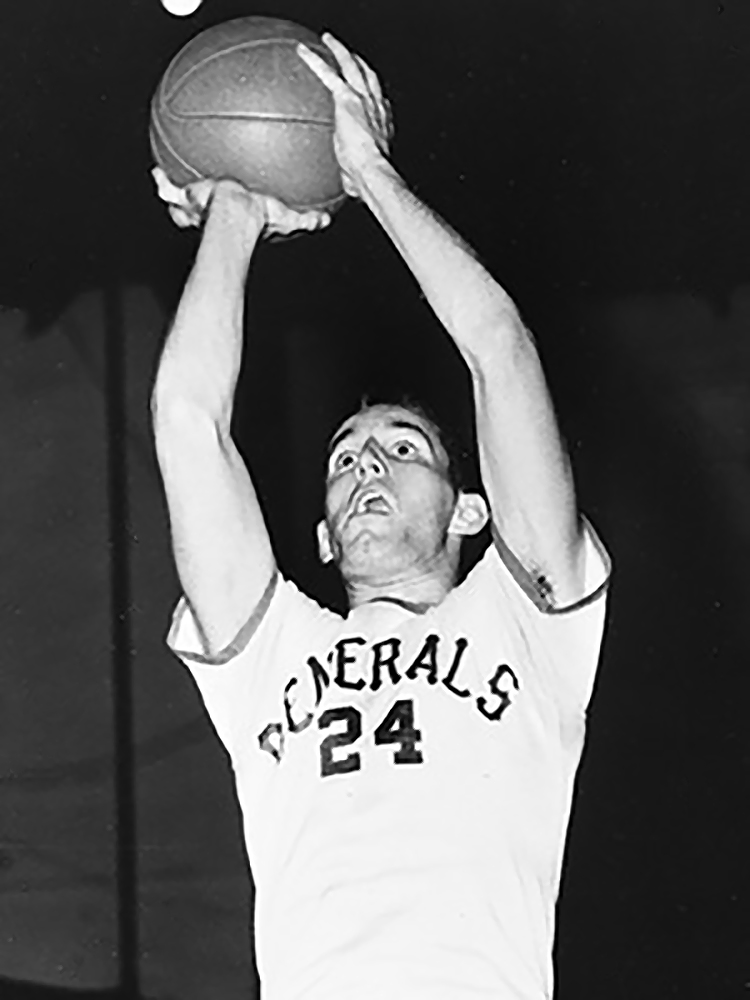
Dom Flora, Washington and Lee, 1958

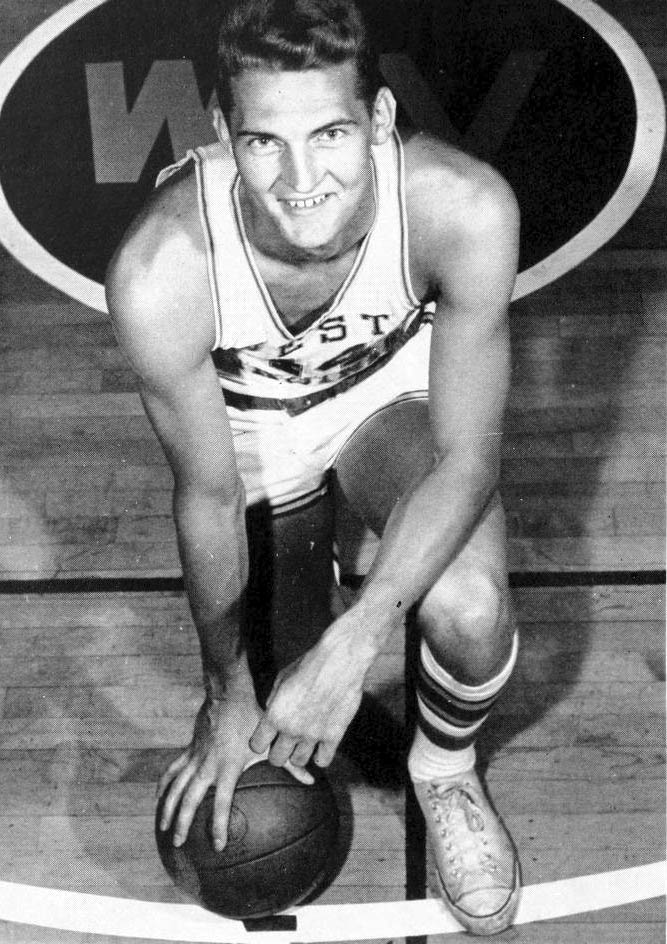
Jerry West, West Virginia, 1959 and 1960

Jeff Cohen, William & Mary, 1961

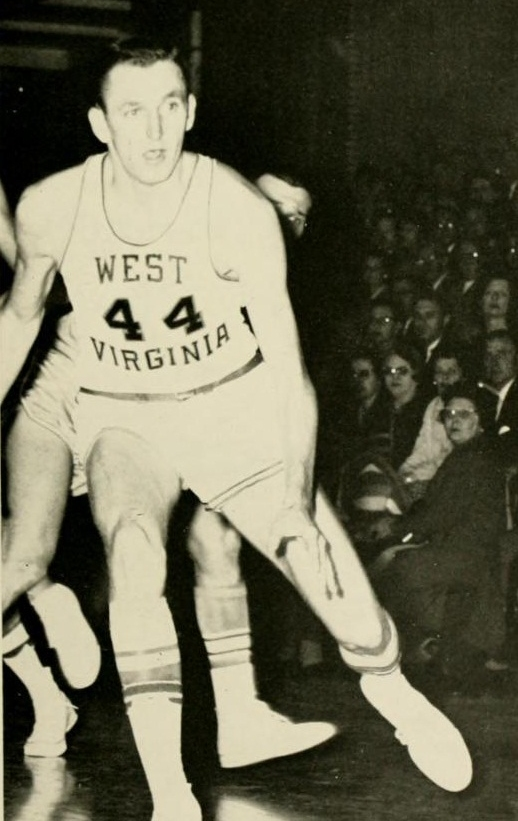
Rod Thorn, West Virginia, 1962

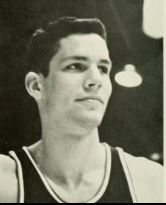
Fred Hetzel, Davidson, 1963 through 1965

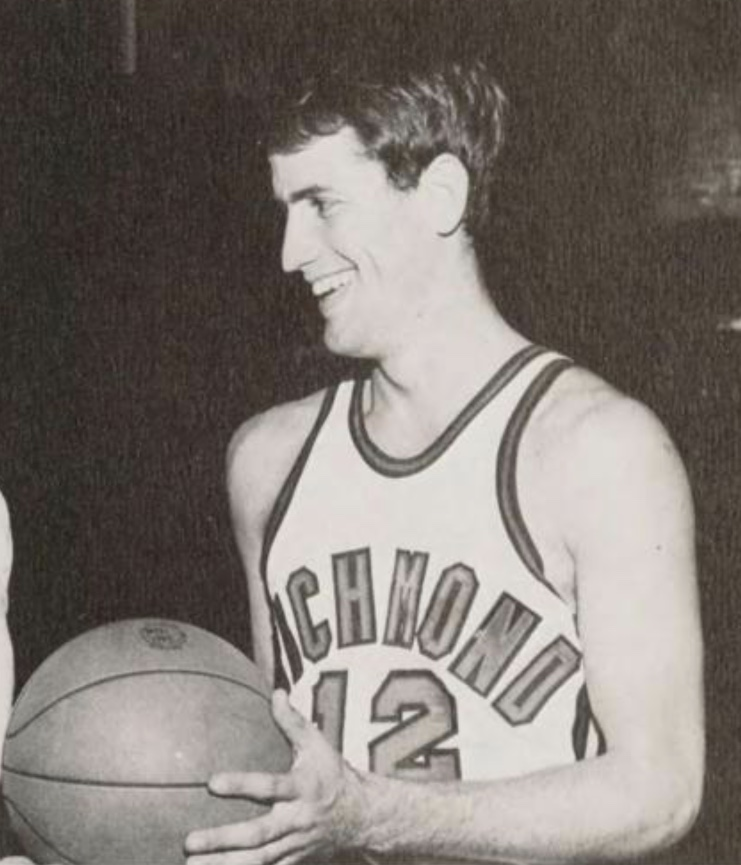
Johnny Moates, Richmond, 1967

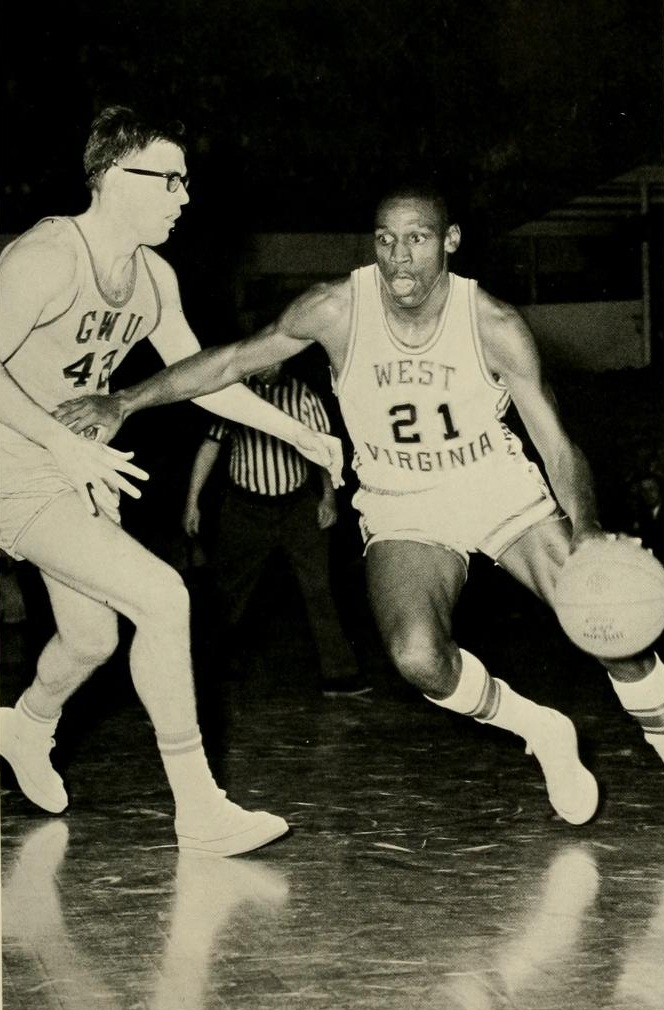
Ron Williams, West Virginia, 1968

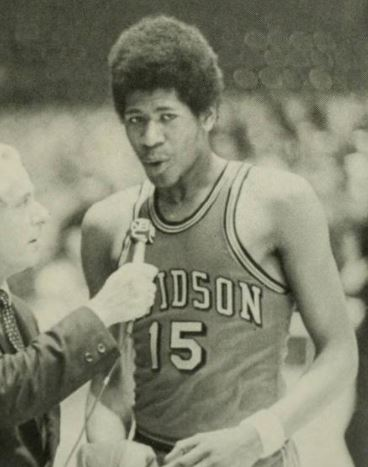
Mike Maloy, Davidson, 1969 and 1970

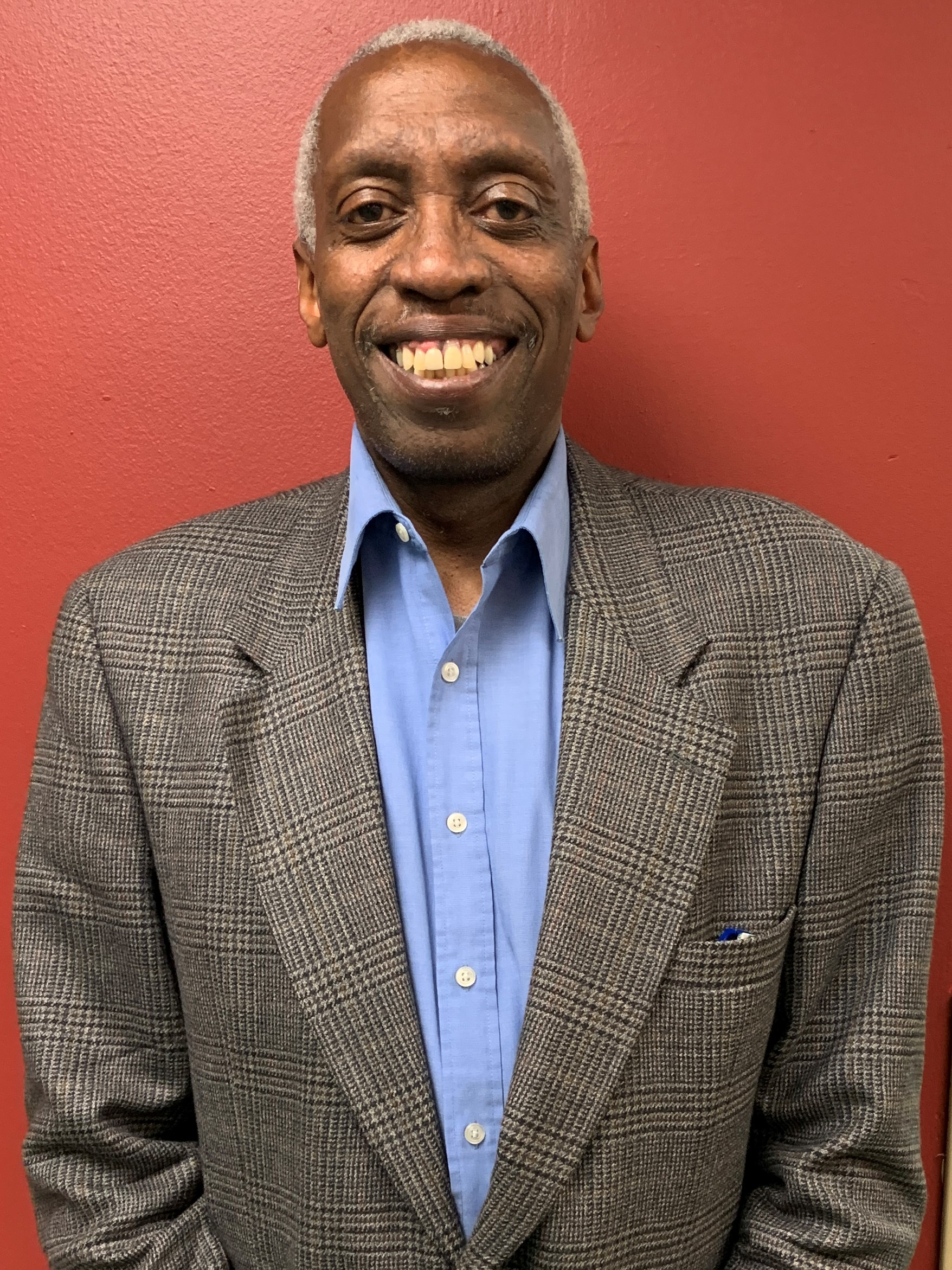
Ron Carter, VMI, 1977 and 1978

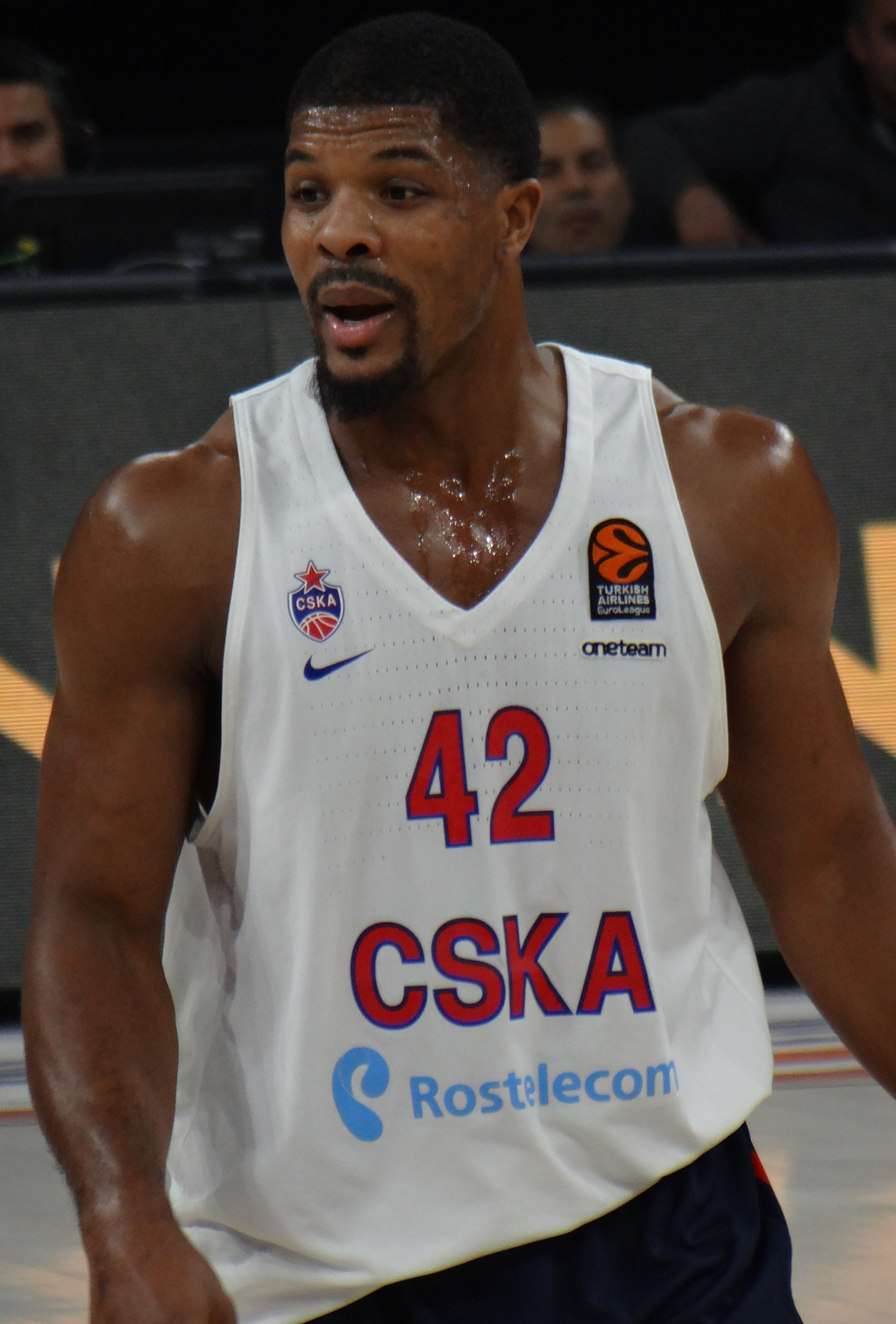
Kyle Hines, UNC Greensboro, 2007

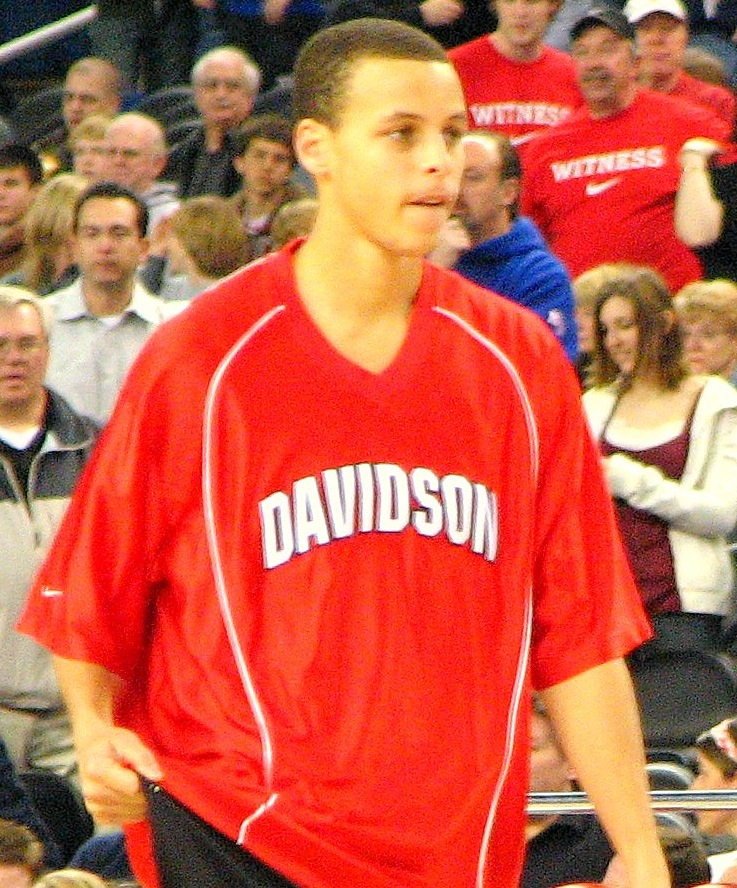
Stephen Curry, Davidson, 2008 and 2009

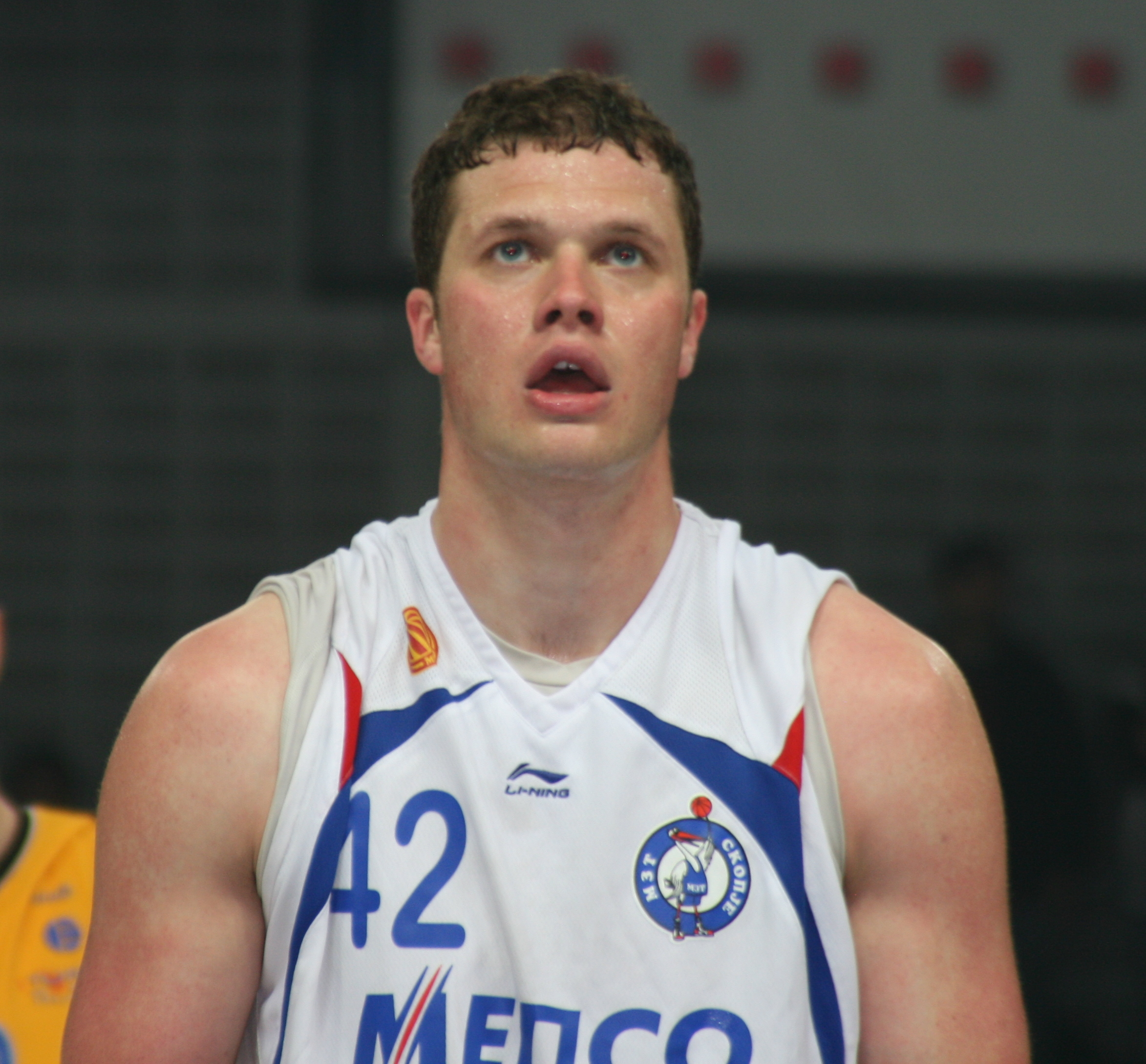
Noah Dahlman, Wofford, 2010

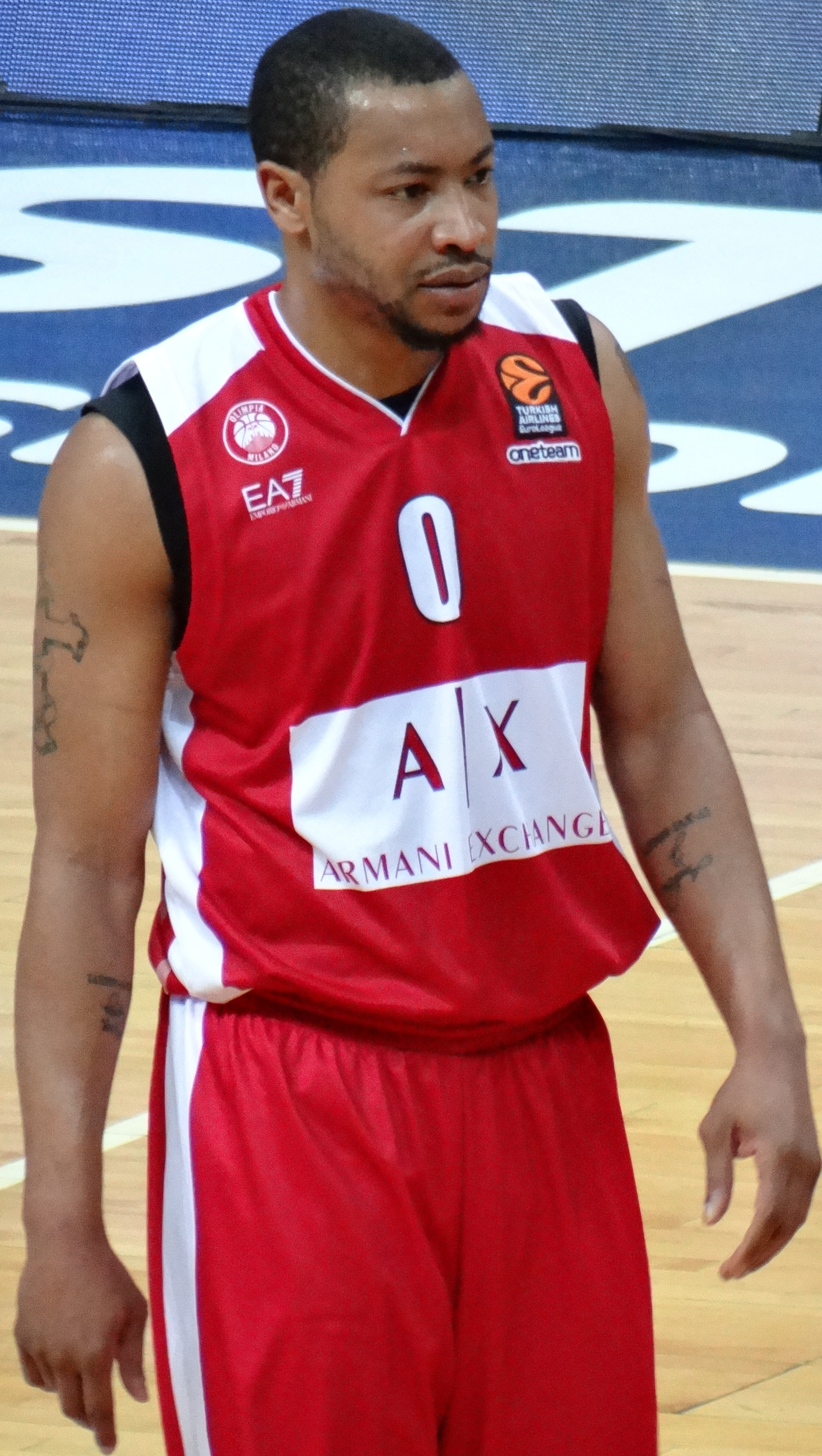
Andrew Goudelock, Charleston, 2011

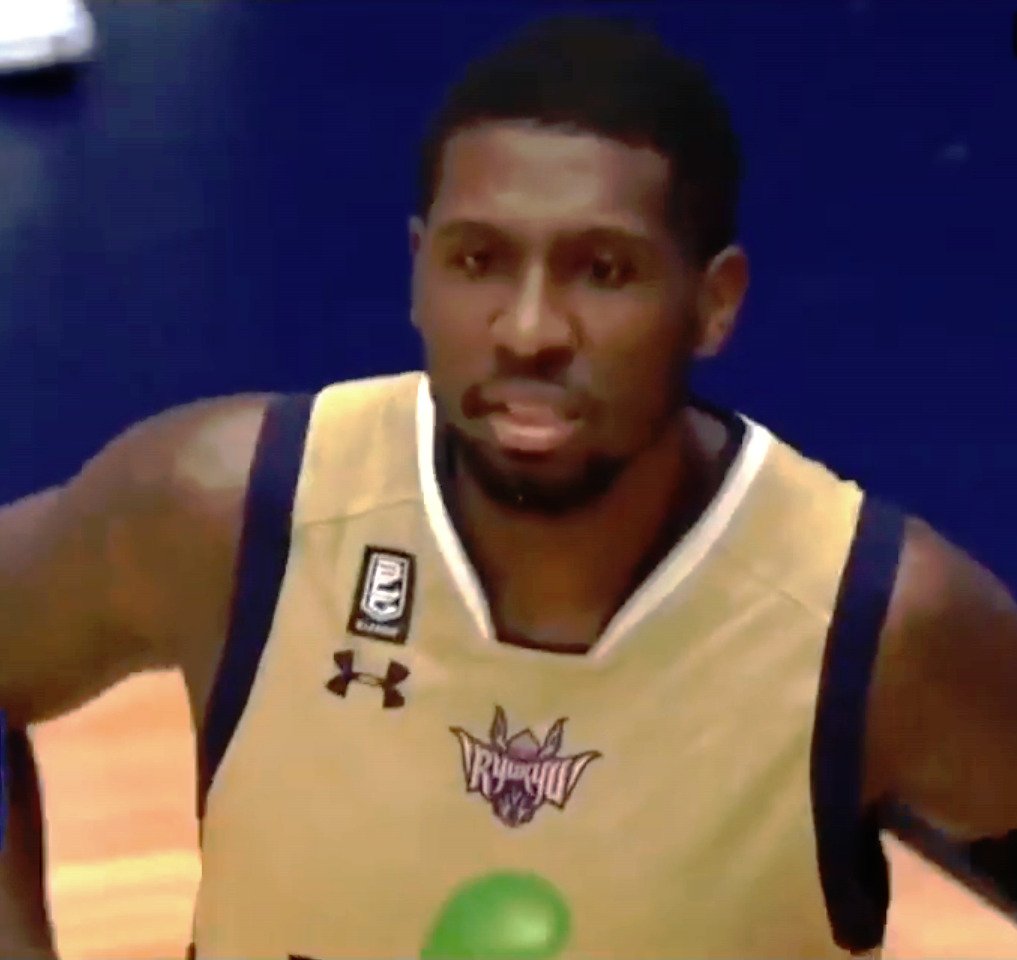
De'Mon Brooks, Davidson, 2012 and 2014

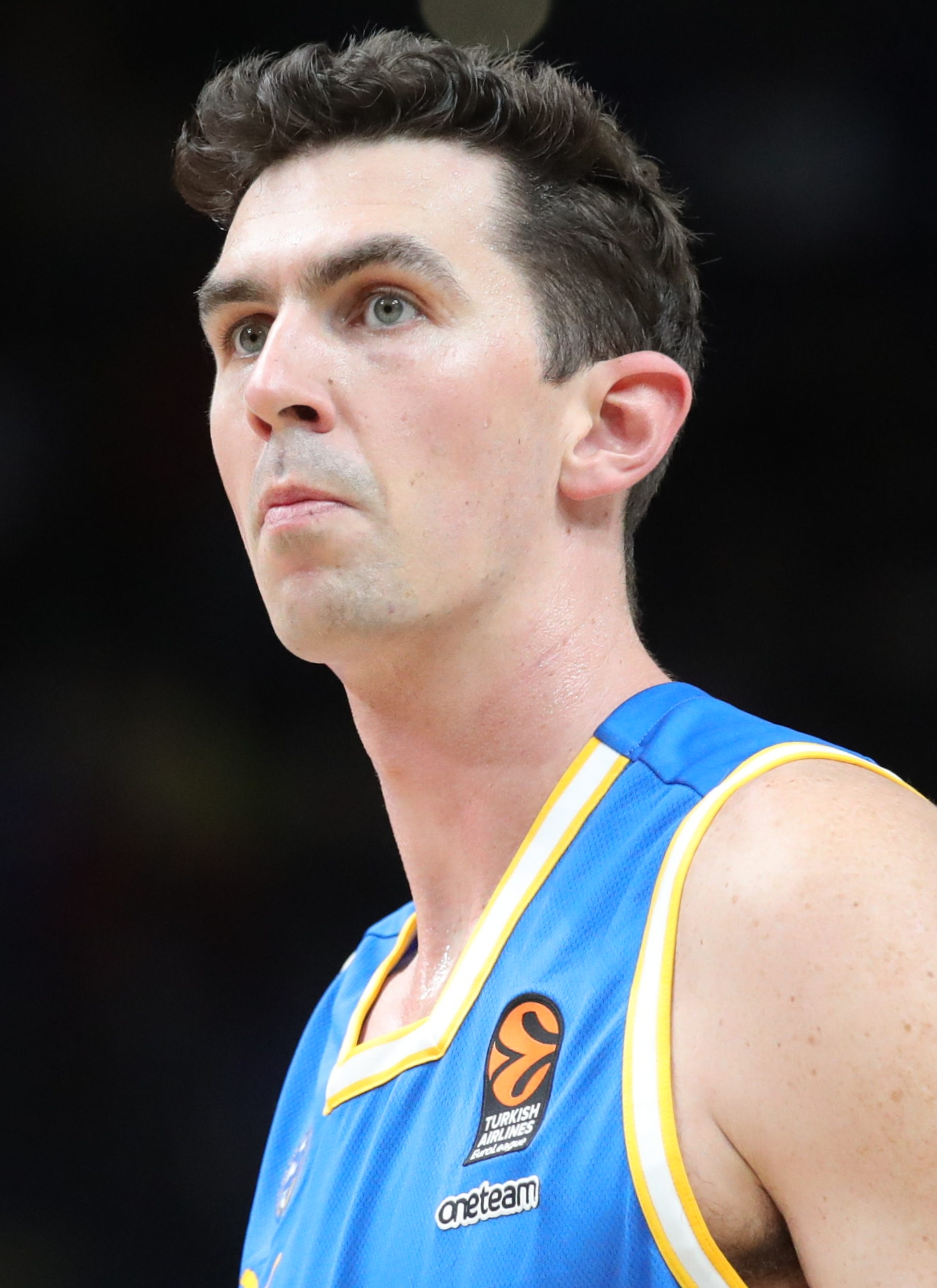
Jake Cohen, Davidson, 2012 and 2013

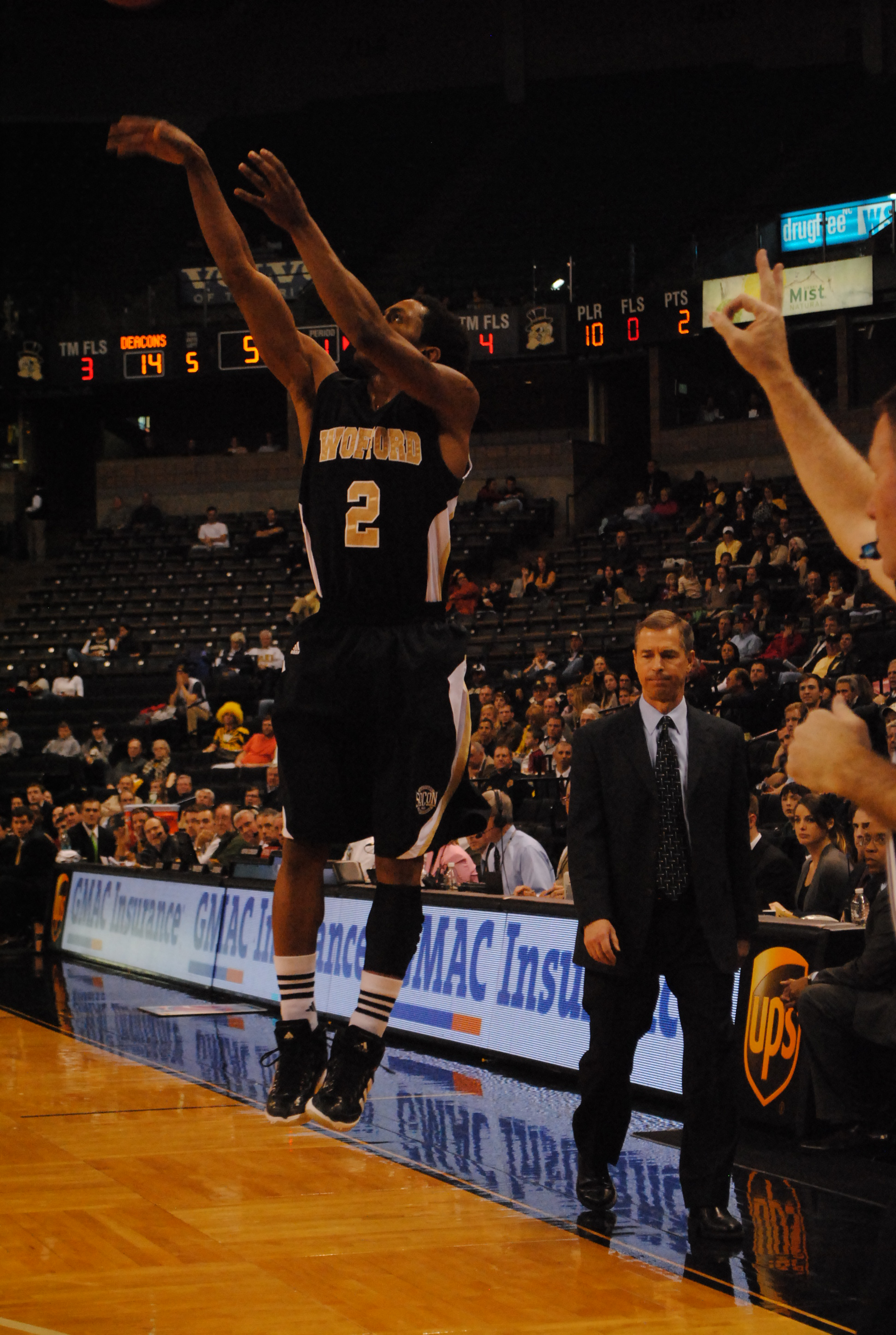
Karl Cochran, Wofford, 2015

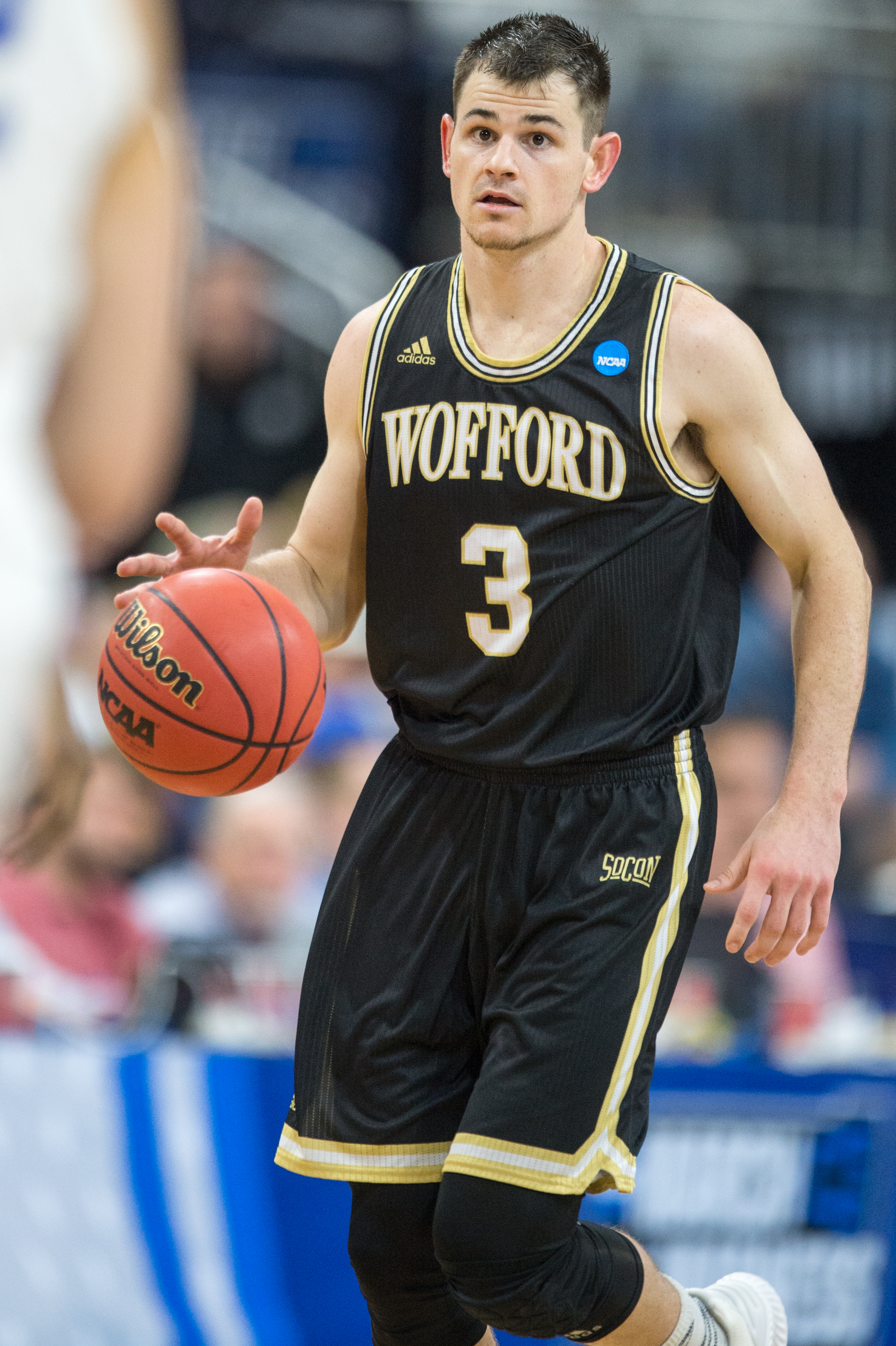
Fletcher Magee, Wofford, 2018 and 2019

Season	Player	School	Position	Class	Reference
1951–52	Dick Groat	Duke	G	Senior	
1952–53	Frank Selvy	Furman	SG	Junior	
1953–54	Frank Selvy (2)	Furman	SG	Senior	
1954–55	Darrell Floyd	Furman	G	Junior	
1955–56	Darrell Floyd (2)	Furman	G	Senior	
1956–57	Hot Rod Hundley	West Virginia	SF / SG	Senior	
1957–58	Dom Flora	Washington and Lee	PG	Senior	
1958–59	Jerry West	West Virginia	G	Junior	
1959–60	Jerry West (2)	West Virginia	G	Senior	
1960–61	Jeff Cohen	William & Mary	C	Senior	
1961–62	Rod Thorn	West Virginia	PG / SG	Junior	
1962–63	Fred Hetzel	Davidson	C / PF	Sophomore	
1963–64	Fred Hetzel (2)	Davidson	C / PF	Junior	
1964–65	Fred Hetzel (3)	Davidson	C / PF	Senior	
1965–66	Dick Snyder	Davidson	SG	Senior	
1966–67	Johnny Moates	Richmond	G	Senior	
1967–68	Ron Williams	West Virginia	G	Senior	
1968–69	Mike Maloy	Davidson	C	Junior	
1969–70	Mike Maloy (2)	Davidson	C	Senior	
1970–71^{†}	Jim Gregory	East Carolina	F	Senior	
1970–71^{†}	Tom Jasper	William & Mary	F	Senior	
1971–72	Russ Hunt	Furman	C	Junior	
1972–73	Aron Stewart	Richmond	SF / SG	Junior	
1973–74	Clyde Mayes	Furman	PF	Junior	
1974–75	Clyde Mayes (2)	Furman	PF	Senior	
1975–76	Rodney McKeever	The Citadel	PG	Junior	
1976–77	Ron Carter	VMI	SG / PG	Junior	
1977–78	Ron Carter (2)	VMI	SG / PG	Senior	
1978–79	Jonathan Moore	Furman	F	Junior	
1979–80	Jonathan Moore (2)	Furman	F	Senior	
1980–81	Charles Payton	Appalachian State	F	Junior	
1981–82	Willie White	Chattanooga	SG	Sophomore	
1982–83	Troy Lee Mikell	East Tennessee State	SG	Senior	
1983–84	Regan Truesdale	The Citadel	PF / C	Junior	
1984–85	Regan Truesdale (2)	The Citadel	PF / C	Senior	
1985–86	Gay Elmore	VMI	SF	Junior	
1986–87	Gay Elmore (2)	VMI	SF	Senior	
1987–88	Skip Henderson	Marshall	PG	Senior	
1988–89	John Taft	Marshall	PG	Sophomore	
1989–90^{†}	Keith Jennings^{C}	East Tennessee State	PG	Junior	
1989–90^{†}	John Taft^{M} (2)	Marshall	PG	Junior	
1990–91	Keith Jennings (2)	East Tennessee State	PG	Senior	
1991–92^{†}	Terry Boyd^{M}	Western Carolina	G	Senior	
1991–92^{†}	Keith Nelson^{C}	Chattanooga	C	Senior	
1992–93	Tim Brooks	Chattanooga	PG	Senior	
1993–94^{†}	Chad Copeland^{C}	Chattanooga	PG	Senior	
1993–94^{†}	Frankie King^{M}	Western Carolina	SG / PG	Junior	
1994–95	Frankie King (2)	Western Carolina	SG / PG	Senior	
1995–96	Anquell McCollum	Western Carolina	SG	Senior	
1996–97	Johnny Taylor	Chattanooga	SF	Senior	
1997–98^{†}	Bobby Phillips^{C}	Western Carolina	SF	Senior	
1997–98^{†}	Chuck Vincent^{M}	Furman	PF / C	Senior	
1998–99	Sedric Webber	Charleston	F	Senior	
1999–00	Tyson Patterson	Appalachian State	PG	Senior	
2000–01	Jody Lumpkin	Charleston	C	Senior	
2001–02^{†}	Dimeco Childress^{C}	East Tennessee State	SG	Senior	
2001–02^{†}	Jason Conley^{M}	VMI	SG / SF	Freshman	
2002–03	Troy Wheless	Charleston	SG	Senior	
2003–04	Zakee Wadood	East Tennessee State	SF	Senior	
2004–05	Brendan Winters	Davidson	SG	Junior	
2005–06	Elton Nesbitt	Georgia Southern	PG	Senior	
2006–07	Kyle Hines	UNC Greensboro	PF	Junior	
2007–08	Stephen Curry	Davidson	SG / PG	Sophomore	
2008–09	Stephen Curry (2)	Davidson	SG / PG	Junior	
2009–10^{†}	Noah Dahlman^{C}	Wofford	F	Junior	
2009–10^{†}	Donald Sims^{M}	Appalachian State	PG	Junior	
2010–11	Andrew Goudelock	Charleston	SG / PG	Senior	
2011–12^{†}	De'Mon Brooks^{C}	Davidson	SF	Sophomore	
2011–12^{†}	Jake Cohen^{M}	Davidson	PF	Junior	
2012–13	Jake Cohen (2)	Davidson	PF	Senior	
2013–14	De'Mon Brooks (2)	Davidson	SF	Senior	
2014–15	Karl Cochran	Wofford	SG	Senior	
2015–16	Stephen Croone	Furman	SG	Senior	
2016–17	Devin Sibley	Furman	SG	Junior	
2017–18^{†}	Desonta Bradford^{C}	East Tennessee State	PG	Senior	
2017–18^{†}	Fletcher Magee^{M}	Wofford	SG	Junior	
2018–19	Fletcher Magee (2)	Wofford	SG	Senior	
2019–20	Isaiah Miller	UNC Greensboro	PG	Junior	
2020–21	Isaiah Miller (2)	UNC Greensboro	PG	Senior	
2021–22	Malachi Smith	Chattanooga	SG	Junior	
2022–23	Jalen Slawson	Furman	F	Graduate	
2023–24	Vonterius Woolbright	Western Carolina	PG	Senior	
2024–25	Quimari Peterson	East Tennessee State	SG	Senior	
2025–26	Jadin Booth	Samford	SG / PG	Graduate	

== Winners by school ==
School (year joined)	Winners	Years
Davidson (1936) (Note: Davidson College left in 2014 to join the Atlantic 10 Conference (A10).)	13	1963, 1964, 1965, 1966, 1969, 1970, 2005, 2008, 2009, 2012 (×2)^{†}, 2013, 2014
Furman (1936)	13	1953, 1954, 1955, 1956, 1972, 1974, 1975, 1979, 1980, 1998^{†}, 2016, 2017, 2023
East Tennessee State (1978, 2014) (Note: East Tennessee State University left in 2005 to join the Atlantic Sun Conference and returned in 2014.)	7	1983, 1990^{†}, 1991, 2002^{†}, 2004, 2018^{†}, 2025
Chattanooga (1976)	6	1982, 1992^{†}, 1993, 1994^{†}, 1997, 2022
Western Carolina (1976)	6	1992^{†}, 1994^{†}, 1995, 1996, 1998^{†}, 2024
VMI (1924, 2014) (Note: Virginia Military Institute left in 2003 to join the Big South Conference and returned in 2014.)	5	1977, 1978, 1986, 1987, 2002^{†}
West Virginia (1950) (Note: West Virginia University left in 1968 to become an independent. The Mountaineers are now in the Big 12 Conference.)	5	1957, 1959, 1960, 1962, 1968
Charleston (1998) (Note: The College of Charleston left in 2013 to join the Coastal Athletic Association (CAA).)	4	1999, 2001, 2003, 2011
Wofford (1997)	4	2010, 2015, 2018, 2019
Appalachian State (1971) (Note: Appalachian State University and Georgia Southern University left in 2014 to join the Sun Belt Conference.)	3	1981, 2000, 2010^{†}
The Citadel (1936)	3	1976, 1984, 1985
Marshall (1976) (Note: Marshall University left in 1997 to join the Mid-American Conference. The Thundering Herd are now in Conference USA (C-USA).)	3	1988, 1989, 1990^{†}
UNC Greensboro (1997)	3	2007, 2020, 2021
Richmond (1936) (Note: The University of Richmond left in 1976 to become an independent. The Spiders are now in the A10.)	2	1967, 1973
William & Mary (1936) (Note: The College of William & Mary left in 1977 to join the ECAC. When the ECAC split its basketball section into multiple conferences in 1982, William & Mary became a charter member of the ECAC South basketball league. The Tribe remain in the conference, which is now the CAA.)	2	1961, 1971^{†}
Duke (1928) (Note: Duke University left in 1953 to become a charter member of the ACC.)	1	1952
East Carolina (1964) (Note: East Carolina University left in 1976 to become an independent. The Pirates are now in the American Athletic Conference.)	1	1971^{†}
Georgia Southern (1991)	1	2006
Samford (2008)	1	2026
Washington and Lee (1921) (Note: Washington and Lee University left in 1958. They are now in the Division III Old Dominion Athletic Conference.)	1	1958
Elon (2003) (Note: Elon University left in 2014 to join the CAA.)	0	—
Mercer (2014)	0	—
Tennessee Tech (2026)	0	—
