= Russ Hunt =

American basketball player

Personal information
- Born: c. 1951 Milford, Connecticut, U.S.
- Listed height: 6 ft 8 in (2.03 m)

Career information
- College: Furman (1970–1973)
- NBA draft: 1973: 10th round, 161st overall pick
- Drafted by: Chicago Bulls
- Position: Center

Career highlights
- SoCon Player of the Year (1972); 2× First-team All-SoCon (1971, 1972)
- Stats at Basketball Reference

Russell W. Hunt Jr. (born c. 1951) is an American former basketball player. He is known for his collegiate career at Furman University between 1970–71 and 1972–73. During Hunt's sophomore and junior seasons he was a First Team All-Southern Conference (SoCon) selection while the latter season saw him be named the Southern Conference Player of the Year. That year, he led the SoCon in scoring at 22.5 points per game as well as field goal percentage with 52.6%. Hunt was also named to the 1972 All-SoCon tournament Team. For his career, Hunt scored 1,248 points. He led the Paladins to two NCAA tournaments (1971, 1973) and also garnered five SoCon Player of the Week awards during his three seasons.

The Chicago Bulls selected him in the 1973 NBA draft (10th round, 161st overall) but he never ended up playing professionally.
