= Desonta Bradford =

American basketball player (born 1996)

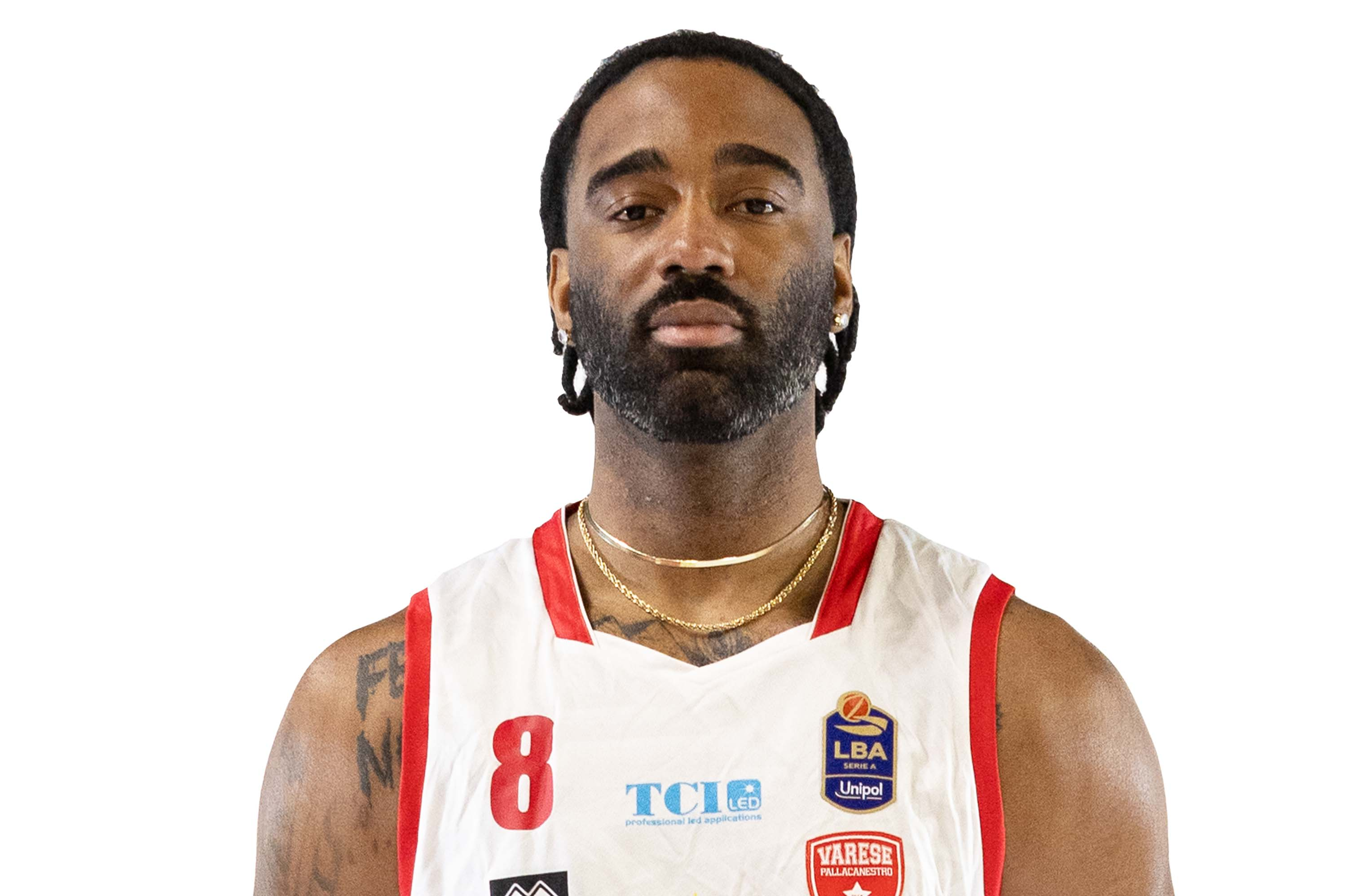

Free Agent
- Position: Shooting guard

Personal information
- Born: April 12, 1996 (age 30)
- Listed height: 6 ft 4 in (1.93 m)
- Listed weight: 190 lb (86 kg)

Career information
- High school: Humboldt (Humboldt, Tennessee)
- College: East Tennessee State (2014–2018)
- NBA draft: 2018: undrafted
- Playing career: 2018–present

Career history
- 2018–2019: Körmend
- 2019–2020: Phoenix Brussels
- 2021–2022: Dolomiti Energia Trento
- 2022–2023: Antwerp Giants
- 2023–2024: BC Kalev
- 2024: UCC Assigeco Piacenza
- 2024–2025: Pallacanestro Varese

Career highlights
- Belgian Cup winner (2023); SoCon Player of the Year – Coaches (2018); First-team All-SoCon (2018); Tennessee Mr. Basketball (2014)

Desonta Bradford (born April 12, 1996) is an American basketball player who last played for Pallacanestro Varese of the Lega Basket Serie A (LBA). He played college basketball for East Tennessee State. He was named the 2017–18 Southern Conference Player of the Year by the league's coaches.

== Early career ==
Bradford was a key piece of the Humboldt High School team that won a 2013 Class A state championship. As a freshman at East Tennessee State, he averaged 4.1 points per game. He improved to 6.8 points per game as a sophomore.

As a senior, Bradford averaged 15.5 points, 5.8 rebounds, and 3.5 assists per game, and led the league in steals. At the close of the season, he was awarded the Malcolm U. Pitt SoCon Player of the Year by the league's coaches while Wofford's Fletcher Magee got the nod from the media.

== Professional career ==
On July 20, 2018, Bradford signed with Hungarian team Egis Körmend.

On 4 July 2019, Bradford signed with Phoenix Brussels of the Belgian Pro Basketball League (PBL). He averaged 10.2 points, 3.9 rebounds, 2.8 assists, and 1.9 steals per game. On July 28, 2021, Bradford signed with Dolomiti Energia Trento of the Lega Basket Serie A.

On August 17, 2022, he has signed with Hapoel Be'er Sheva of the Israeli Basketball Premier League. On September 2, 2022, he left the team without playing a single game related to personal problems.

On November 12, 2022, he signed with Telenet Giants Antwerp of the Belgian BNXT League. On 12 March 2023, Bradford and the Giants won the Belgian Cup after beating BC Oostende in the final. He scored a shared team-high 18 points in the final.

On December 26, 2024, he signed with Pallacanestro Varese of the Lega Basket Serie A (LBA).
