= American Cadet Alliance =

Non-profit para-military youth education organization

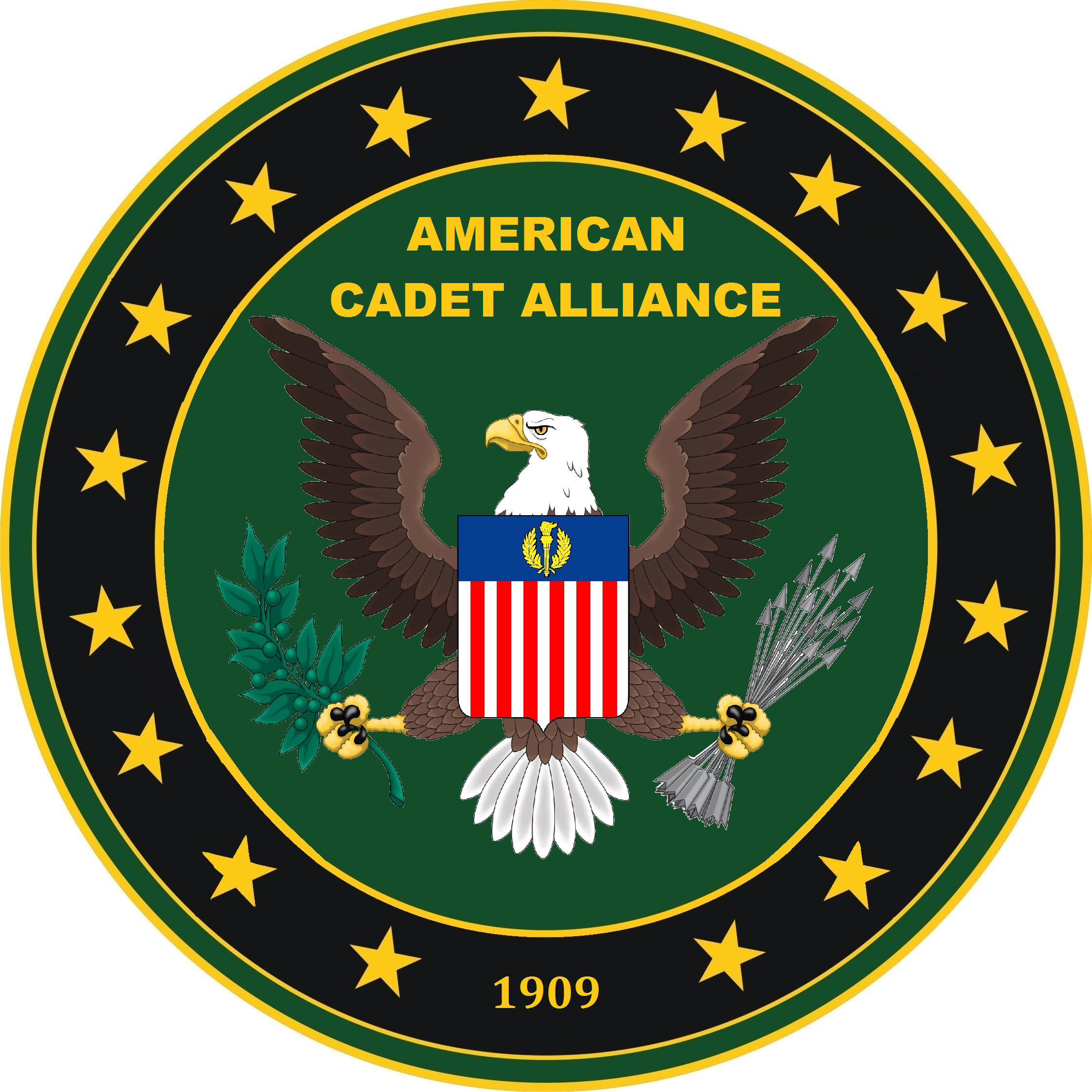
- American Cadet Alliance seal
- Active: 10 April 1909
- Country: United States
- Role: Independent national cadet program and youth mentoring
- Size: Brigade
- Part of: American Military Cadet Corps

Commanders
- Notable commanders: CAPT James Smyth; RADM Gilbert Murdoch; BG Peter Genovese; BG Charles Turnow

American Cadet Alliance

Standard uniform colors for ACA	Ceremony uniform

The American Cadet Alliance (ACA), formerly the United States Army Cadet Corps (USAC) was founded under the name "Colonel Cody's Boy Scouts" by Captain James H. C. Smyth at the First Presbyterian Church, Manhattan, New York in 1909. The ACA is the oldest nationwide Cadet program in the United States. It is the national cadet program branch of the American Military Cadet Corps (AMCC), its parent organization. ACA and American Military Cadet Corps is an independent national cadet program (similar to the Young Marines), and therefore is not a governmental agency, and is not an official entity of the United States Army.

The ACA (former USAC) is a 501(c)(3) non-profit youth education organization.

== History ==
The American Cadet Alliance was founded as Colonel Cody's Boy Scouts by Captain James H. C. Smyth on 10 April 1909, at the First Presbyterian Church in Manhattan, New York. Shortly thereafter, the group was reorganized as the American Naval and Marine Scouts. The American Naval and Marine Scouts continued to evolve, and on 16 August 1927, the organization was incorporated under the laws of the State of New York as the New York Junior Naval Militia, Inc. In early 1929, the organization split and its founder, as well as a number of senior officers, incorporated the Junior Naval Reserve, Inc., on 19 February 1929.

Early in 1938, during the heightening of World War II, the War Department instructed the Secretaries of State to require all organizations using the words "naval", "militia" and "reserve" as a part of their corporate name to rename their organizations so as not to cause public confusion regarding their relationship to the armed services. To comply with this request, the Junior Naval Reserve, Inc. reincorporated on 14 June 1938 as the American Nautical Cadets, Inc., and on 2 November 1938, the New York Junior Naval Militia, Inc. changed its name to the Maritime Brigade, Inc.

As a result of this reorganization, due in part to a number of mergers with other, smaller cadet organizations, the American Nautical Cadets, Inc. reincorporated on 3 October 1956 as the American Nautical Alliance, Inc. The organization came full circle on 15 September 1960 when the American Nautical Alliance, Inc. and the Maritime Brigade, Inc. merged to become the American Cadet Alliance, Inc.

The USAC (United States Army Cadet Corps) was created in 2000 and was the fastest-growing brigade in the ACA, in comparison with the Naval Cadets and Marine Cadets.

Then in 2007, the decision to phase out all of the brigades except for the Army was made. This decision was made due to the high interest in the Army brigade and lack of interest in the Marine and Naval brigade. Along with the support from the US Army Reserve and Army National Guard, in April 2009 this transition was completed. Starting in 2011 USAC decided to open a military school named Forest Hill Military Academy at its headquarters the former site of Millerburg Military Institute. This decision was not universally supported by the volunteer cadre of USAC and led to the eventual departure of many experienced adult leaders. All funding brought in by USAC, including that of its widely popular summer camp "Military Adventure Camp", went into operating the school, which eventually failed. The opening of the school led to the dismissal of Commandant Charles Tornow and his staff. The final commander for USAC was Jay Whitehead, a former politician who did not have a military background. When he took control of USAC, the majority of the cadre with any experience left. In 2015 there was an influx of fresh staff members who spearheaded the re-branding/re-organization of the ACA, and the decision to bring back Marine Cadetting and Naval Cadets was made in keeping with the spirit of the original intent of the founders of the program. Unfortunately, this initiative failed and under the management of Jay Whitehead, the organization attempted bankruptcy but was dismissed from bankruptcy court due to failure to cooperate. Creditors of USAC were never paid. Whitehead resigned his position with USAC without alerting the receiver appointed by the AG's office of the Commonwealth of Kentucky. He established a new non-profit Military Adventure Camp, Inc to run summer camps under the branding established by USAC. No assets or equipment owned by USAC were sold to pay creditors, leading many to question where Whitehead sourced the equipment needed to operate his new summer camp.

The Millersburg headquarters of USAC was foreclosed on in 2016.

Former commandants of the American Cadet Alliance include:

- CAPT James H.C. Smyth (founder)
- RADM Gilbert G. Murdoch
- BG Peter Genovese
- BG Charles Tornow

== Organization ==
As of mid–2006, the ACA's organizational model is largely nominal and has been established to accommodate an expected upswing in membership and unit activations.

A unit is given a name reflecting its locality, as well as a unit designation indicating the company, battalion, and district. For instance, the designation of the Military Cadets of Selfridge (Michigan) is B Co., 5/1, or Bravo Company, Fifth Battalion, 1st CTR.

Most units drill on military installations, military reserve centers, or National Guard armories and most receive a great deal of cooperation and support from their host units. Drills are generally on the Guard/Reserve model, with one weekend drill per month.

== Cadet membership ==
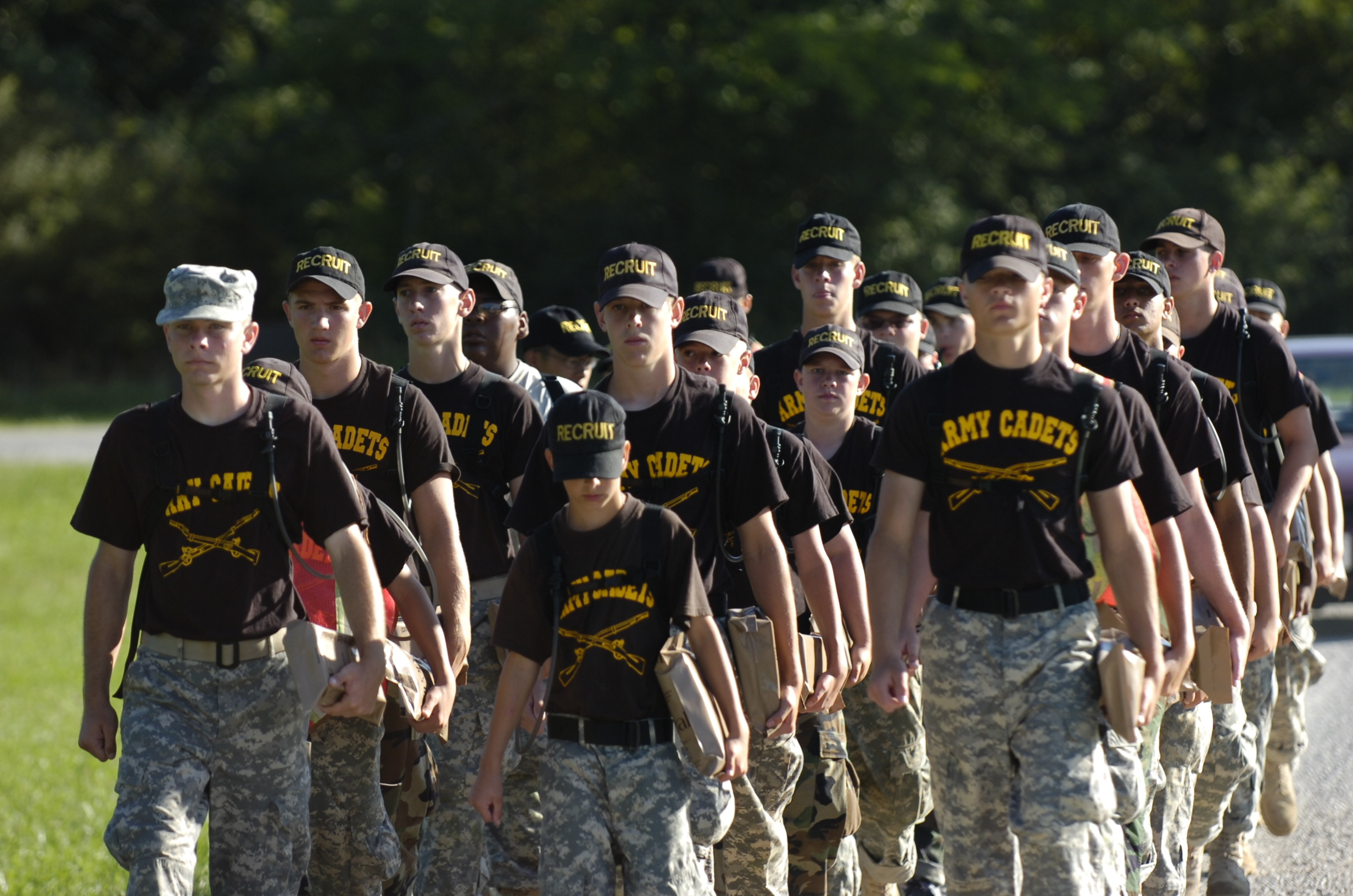
Members of the American Cadet Alliance, who come from all over the United States, spend three weeks in July conducting their annual training at Camp Atterbury.

Cadets are members between the ages of 12 and 20 (although 11-year-olds can be accepted after 5th grade). They must be enrolled in school and receiving passing grades, be drug and crime-free, and be of weight proportional to their height. The applicant cannot be overly obese. The prospective cadet should be able to do basic exercises like push-ups and sit-ups and be able to run. The applicant must be able to pass a "sports-type" physical exam by a doctor and cannot have any communicable diseases, chronic health problems, or severe allergies. Once a cadet turns 18, they can choose to stay in the program as a cadet or become a junior cadre member. If they stay as a cadet, they can stay in the program only until they turn 21.

One of the features of the cadet application process for the ACA is that the Cadet must volunteer and sign for themselves. The parents still must sign the appropriate permission forms, but overall the Cadet applicant cannot be forced to sign up. The ACA is not a delinquency program and the organization has strict policies regarding this issue.

The cadet rank system in the ACA is the same as in the U.S. military enlisted system. Just like the U.S. Naval Sea Cadet Corps, the Young Marines, the Canadian cadet organizations, and the British cadet forces, cadet ranks only encompass enlisted ranks and no officer ranks. Cadets enter at grade cadet C-1 and work their way up to cadet sergeant major (Army/ Marine Military cadets) or cadet master chief (Navy military cadets) C-9. However, cadets who continue in the program when they enter college can become an officer cadet until they turn 21, at which time they become an Officer Candidate. The title of each grade is based on the branch they are enrolled in, but all ACA Cadets begin their time in the program as "recruits". The new ACA Cadets remain recruits until their first summer camp, where they are given the chance to earn the title "cadet". They can promote to C-2 before that first summer camp, but that promotion is provisional. Once at summer camp, a provisional E-2 will remove his rank and again become a C-1 recruit. Only after graduating from their first summer camp can a cadet be actually called "cadet" and be permanently promoted above the rank of C-1. They also hold company positions such as company first sergeant, platoon sergeant, or squad leader. The most senior ranking cadet is a command cadet, who serves as the senior cadet advisor to the National Staff with the rank of cadet command sergeant major (Army military cadets), cadet sergeant major (Marine military cadets) or cadet command master chief (Navy military cadets).

== Adult membership ==
Membership in the ACA Officers' Corps is a privilege reserved for those individuals who desire to promote the objectives and purposes of the ACA and who meet the eligibility requirements. Leadership and command of the ACA, at all levels, is provided by a dedicated corps of non-paid professional officers, adult noncommissioned officers (NCO) and instructors. Each Officers' Corps applicant must complete a series of prerequisites and a thorough screening process prior to receiving a commission or appointment as an officer or NCO in the American Military Cadet Corps.

There are several categories for the Officer Corps, which are outlined below.

=== Instructor ===
An appointment as an instructor may be granted to individuals who wish to participate in ACA activities in a non-military capacity. Instructors do not wear a military uniform but are required to dress in appropriate ACA attire. This category of membership is extremely flexible and its requirements are not as high as a uniformed staff member, but a high level of professionalism and moral integrity is always required.

=== Adult non-commissioned officers ===
Appointment as an adult non-commissioned officer (NCO) is open to those individuals who have served honorably in the U.S. military in grades E-4 through E-9 who prefer to maintain their status as non-commissioned officers rather than to apply for a commission in the ACA Officers' Corps. Those individuals choosing to remain as non-commissioned officers will be appointed to a grade comparable to the highest enlisted grade held while in the military. Adult NCOs are assigned a position within the unit, comparable with their rank and billet while on active duty or in the reserves. Adult NCOs are always needed in a training capacity to work directly with the cadets.

=== Warrant officers ===
A commission as a warrant officer is open to those individuals who are specialists in a field of endeavor and who desire to instruct in technical skills, or perform a single function within the unit, causing them to be best suited to apply for commissioning as a warrant officer in the ACA Officer's Corps.

=== Commissioned officers ===
A commission as an ACA officer is open to those individuals who have the desire, self-discipline, self-confidence, critical judgment, and moral integrity to put on the uniform. The American Cadet Alliance Officer Corps take this uniform seriously and expect any prospective commissioned officer to as well. ACA Officers are held to a higher standard.

== Individual Training Company membership ==
Individual Training Company (ITC) cadets are cadet members of the organization who are not located near a drilling unit. These cadets and Officer Corps members function largely on their own throughout the year, often coordinating through their local military recruiter for assistance tasks and training. ITC members go to Annual Training in the summer with the rest of the ACA as a whole. The ITC is open to anyone who wishes to join the program (with parental consent and paperwork) and is then enrolled in the program as a member of ACA.

== Controversy at Military Adventure Camp ==
In March 2013, a Pendleton County, Kentucky mother filed a lawsuit stating that her son and daughter had been sexually molested while attending Military Adventure Camp. The suit described two separate cases of abuse starting in 2010 - sexual advances by a camp instructor against her son, and misconduct against her daughter by a fellow cadet. Filed on 5 March 2013, the suit alleged negligence, intentional infliction of emotional distress, negligent hiring, and improper training and supervision by the corps. The employee, a non-instructor staff member, was fired from his position and investigated by law enforcement. The charges by the family were later dropped, some speculate due to the disbarring of their attorney.

In June 2013, Paris Fire Department Inspector Battalion Chief Mike Duffy ordered the U.S. Army Cadet Corps to evacuate about 70 teenage cadets and adult staffers from two buildings at Military Adventure Camp after an anonymous complaint. Electrical wiring problems and other issues were discovered by the investigator. Among the reported problems were "bare walls down to the studs", "electrical wiring dangling from the ceiling", and "kids sleeping within inches of exposed electrical wiring sticking out of the wall". Chief Duffy also cited other problems, including out of date, empty and missing fire extinguishers, inoperative fire alarm systems and missing or defective smoke and heat detectors.

USACC spokesman Brian Lehnhardt said the situation involved the Rankin and McIntyre buildings, both more than 80 years old. According to Lehnhardt cadets and adults had been living in the buildings temporarily during summer camp and the buildings were to be renovated. Despite the findings of the fire inspector's investigation, Lehnhardt stated that "at no time were any of our cadets, recruits or staff in any danger", and that the USAC leadership believed the building was up to code and safe.

In July 2013 the Army Cadet Corps announced plans to tear down the Rankin Building. Lehnhardt stated, "There's just been one issue after another finding more problems with the building than we expected". The adjoining McIntyre Building was to be renovated and brought up to modern fire codes. A press release from the time stated that "After careful re-evaluation by the state and county building inspectors, it was deemed that the only way to save the adjoining McIntyre building would be to demolish Rankin".

== Reorganization ==
Following the controversy from the incident that happened at Military Adventure Camp, the leaders of the USACC resigned their positions and a court-appointed receiver was put in place. Jay Whitehead the business manager brought in to save the finances of USAC's military school took control despite having no military background himself. The United States Army Cadet Corps name was dropped, but Forest Hill Military Academy maintained itself and the cadet units and renamed itself the American Military Cadet Corps (AMCC). AMCC is not endorsed by the U.S. Army and has no relationship with the Army. The AMCC leadership had experience in the military, leading cadets and youth, and was going in a much different direction, with the academy returning with the original historical name, Millersburg Military Institute. In June 2015, it was announced that a merger would occur between the AMCC and another Cadet program. Additional information and details would be announced later, but the headquarters would remain at the National Cadet Training Center in Millersburg for the time being. The AMCC name would remain as the corporate name for the umbrella of the two programs under its command: the National Cadet Program which would be returning to its previous name of American Cadet Alliance, and the Millersburg Military Institute itself serving as the headquarters.

Unfortunately, this initiative failed. Under the management of Jay Whitehead, the organization attempted bankruptcy but was dismissed from bankruptcy court due to failure to cooperate. Creditors of USAC were never paid. Jay Whitehead resigned his position with USAC without alerting the receiver appointed by the AG's office of the Commonwealth of Kentucky and established a new non-profit Military Adventure Camp, Inc. to run summer camps under the branding established by USAC. No assets or equipment owned by USAC were sold to pay creditors, leading many to question where Whitehead had sourced the equipment needed to operate his new camp.

The Millersburg headquarters of USAC was foreclosed on in 2016.

Since the implosion of this once great, thriving, and strong organization, other Officers of the Corps strived in new directions. As Mr. Whitehead took his version of the program one way, several other Staff have brought their pieces of Knowledge and experience forward. Though Mr. Whitehead and some others claim that these splinter programs are not of true heritage. But looking at the Program Historically From COL Cody's Scouts, which was actually a splinter off of the Boy Scouts of America, Splinter programs are the ones who had upheld and cherished that exact heritage. Some went on to success in their programs others went to for Profit programming and others are still carrying the torch to revive Community Cadetting and offer a model that aligns their interests providing some core programming needs for each participating unit with uniform rules on advancement, membership and youth protection guidelines. All of this while allowing Unit CDRs with enough Autonomy to feel they have direct control over their unit. The Board of Directors (BoD) should be elected by the membership and an agreement to operate under Roberts Rules of Order for any Regulation that would affect the Corps.

As of 2022, the website is largely non-functional and included spam links.

== See also ==
- Cadets (youth program)
