= Wofford Terriers men's basketball statistical leaders =

The Wofford Terriers men's basketball statistical leaders are individual statistical leaders of the Wofford Terriers men's basketball program in various categories, including points, assists, blocks, rebounds, and steals. Within those areas, the lists identify single-game, single-season, and career leaders. The Terriers represent the Wofford College in the NCAA's Southern Conference.

Wofford began competing in intercollegiate basketball in 1906. However, the school's record book does not generally list records from before the 1950s, as records from before this period are often incomplete and inconsistent. Since scoring was much lower in this era, and teams played much fewer games during a typical season, it is likely that few or no players from this era would appear on these lists anyway.

The NCAA did not officially record assists as a stat until the 1983–84 season, and blocks and steals until the 1985–86 season, but Wofford's record books includes players in these stats before these seasons. These lists are updated through the end of the 2020–21 season.

== Scoring ==
Career
Rk	Player	Points	Seasons
1	George Lyons	2521	1961–62 1962–63 1963–64 1964–65
2	Fletcher Magee	2516	2015–16 2016–17 2017–18 2018–19
3	James Blair	2269	1979–80 1980–81 1981–82 1982–83
4	Greg O'Dell	2208	1987–88 1988–89 1989–90 1990–91 1991–92
5	Daddy Neal	2078	1949–50 1950–51 1951–52 1952–53
6	Noah Dahlman	2013	2007–08 2008–09 2009–10 2010–11
7	Karl Cochran	1894	2011–12 2012–13 2013–14 2014–15
8	Buddy Hayes	1879	1962–63 1963–64 1964–65 1965–66
9	Ian Chadwick	1789	1997–98 1998–99 1999–00 2000–01
10	Spencer Collins	1696	2012–13 2013–14 2014–15 2015–16

Season
Rk	Player	Points	Season
1	Fletcher Magee	751	2017–18
2	Daddy Neal	750	1952–53
3	George Lyons	741	1963–64
4	Fletcher Magee	709	2018–19
5	George Lyons	705	1964–65
6	Noah Dahlman	682	2010–11
7	Daddy Neal	681	1951–52
8	Ronnie Harris	674	1978–79
9	Doug Lowe	636	1973–74
10	Buddy Hayes	625	1964–65

Single game
Rk	Player	Points	Season	Opponent
1	Daddy Neal	57	1952–53	Erskine
2	Daddy Neal	52	1952–53	CofC
3	Fletcher Magee	45	2017–18	Chattanooga
	Daddy Neal	45	1951–52	Piedmont
5	George Lyons	44	1964–65	Elon
6	Ian Chadwick	40	2000–01	Ga. Southern
	Greg O'Dell	40	1988–89	Newberry
	Matt Mayes	40	1986–87	Morris
	James Blair	40	1982–83	Columbia Bible
	George Lyons	40	1963–64	King
	Daddy Neal	40	1951–52	Furman

== Rebounds ==
Career
Rk	Player	Rebounds	Seasons
1	Daddy Neal	1500	1949–50 1950–51 1951–52 1952–53
2	Bob Waldrop	1206	1959–60 1960–61 1961–62 1962–63
3	Don Fowler	1200	1953–54 1954–55 1955–56 1956–57
4	Willie Pegram	1161	1964–65 1965–66 1966–67 1967–68
5	Stephon Blanding	1149	1986–87 1987–88 1988–89 1989–90
6	James Blair	1019	1979–80 1980–81 1981–82 1982–83
7	Tim Johnson	1002	2007–08 2008–09 2009–10 2010–11
8	Craig Templeton	997	1953–54 1954–55 1955–56 1956–57
9	David Murphy	946	1970–71 1971–72 1972–73 1973–74
10	Lee Skinner	914	2011–12 2012–13 2013–14 2014–15

Season
Rk	Player	Rebounds	Season
1	Daddy Neal	609	1952–53
2	Daddy Neal	495	1951–52
3	Don Fowler	461	1954–55
4	Bill Wade	460	1963–64
5	Bob Waldrop	441	1959–60
6	Trap Hart	428	1959–60
7	Doug Murray	399	1970–71
8	Bob Waldrop	397	1962–63
9	Daddy Neal	396	1950–51
10	Bill Barbee	395	1959–60

Single game
Rk	Player	Rebounds	Season	Opponent
1	Daddy Neal	40	1952–53	Piedmont
	Don Fowler	40	1954–55	Mercer

== Assists ==
Career
Rk	Player	Assists	Seasons
1	Antoine Saunders	582	1983–84 1984–85 1985–86 1986–87
2	Eric Garcia	537	2013–14 2014–15 2015–16 2016–17
3	Drew Gibson	507	2004–05 2005–06 2006–07 2007–08
4	Brad Loesing	483	2008–09 2009–10 2010–11 2011–12
5	Storm Murphy	472	2017–18 2018–19 2019–20 2020–21
6	Donald Nance	392	1986–87 1987–88 1988–89 1989–90
7	Mike Lenzly	349	1999–00 2000–01 2001–02 2002–03
8	Mario Harper	336	1989–90 1990–91 1991–92 1992–93
9	John Hawkins	323	1993–94 1994–95 1995–96 1996–97
10	Ryan Larson	321	2018–19 2019–20 2020–21 2021–22

Season
Rk	Player	Assists	Season
1	Eric Garcia	226	2016–17
2	Robert Mickle	223	1983–84
3	Antoine Saunders	210	1986–87
4	Brad Loesing	184	2011–12
5	Antoine Saunders	181	1984–85
6	Drew Gibson	180	2007–08
7	Antoine Saunders	175	1985–86
8	Doug Lowe	167	1973–74
9	Eric Garcia	153	2015–16
10	Donald Nance	144	1988–89

Single game
Rk	Player	Assists	Season	Opponent
1	Antoine Saunders	15	1986–87	Allen

== Steals ==
Career
Rk	Player	Steals	Seasons
1	Wayne Rice	289	1983–84 1984–85 1985–86 1986–87
2	James Blair	274	1979–80 1980–81 1981–82 1982–83
3	Karl Cochran	226	2011–12 2012–13 2013–14 2014–15
4	Drew Gibson	213	2004–05 2005–06 2006–07 2007–08
5	John Hawkins	174	1993–94 1994–95 1995–96 1996–97
6	Cameron Jackson	168	2014–15 2015–16 2016–17 2017–18 2018–19
7	Antoine Saunders	158	1983–84 1984–85 1985–86 1986–87
8	Mario Harper	144	1989–90 1990–91 1991–92 1992–93
9	Tim Johnson	142	2007–08 2008–09 2009–10 2010–11
10	Howard Wilkerson	137	2002–03 2003–04 2004–05 2005–06

Season
Rk	Player	Steals	Season
1	Wayne Rice	107	1986–87
2	James Blair	88	1979–80
3	Antoine Saunders	81	1986–87
4	John Hawkins	76	1994–95
5	Wayne Rice	68	1985–86
6	James Blair	67	1980–81
7	Drew Gibson	66	2005–06
8	Wayne Rice	65	1983–84
9	Karl Cochran	63	2012–13
	Karl Cochran	63	2014–15

Single game
Rk	Player	Steals	Season	Opponent
1	John Hawkins	9	1994–95	Gardner-Webb

== Blocks ==
Career
Rk	Player	Blocks	Seasons
1	Stephon Blanding	137	1986–87 1987–88 1988–89 1989–90
2	Kenny Hastie	133	1998–99 1999–00 2000–01 2001–02
3	Cameron Jackson	125	2014–15 2015–16 2016–17 2017–18 2018–19
4	Greg O'Dell	116	1987–88 1988–89 1989–90 1990–91 1991–92
5	Karl Cochran	101	2011–12 2012–13 2013–14 2014–15
6	John McGinnis	89	1990–91 1991–92 1992–93 1993–94
7	Sam Daniels	84	2001–02 2002–03 2003–04 2004–05
8	Tyler Berg	69	2002–03 2003–04 2004–05 2005–06
9	Tim Johnson	65	2007–08 2008–09 2009–10 2010–11
10	Howard Wilkerson	61	2002–03 2003–04 2004–05 2005–06

Season
Rk	Player	Blocks	Season
1	Kenny Hastie	49	2000–01
2	Stephon Blanding	45	1988–89
	Cameron Jackson	45	2017–18
4	Brian Sumpter	39	2025–26
5	Chevez Goodwin	38	2019–20
	Stephon Blanding	38	1986–87
7	Karl Cochran	36	2014–15
8	Greg O'Dell	35	1988–89
	Cameron Jackson	35	2018–19
10	Kenny Hastie	34	2001–02

Single game
Rk	Player	Blocks	Season	Opponent
1	Cameron Jackson	6	2017–18	North Carolina
2	Mike Lenzly	5	2001–02	The Citadel
	McCarthy Crenshaw	5	1997–98	Tenn. Wesleyan
	Tim Johnson	5	2010–11	Piedmont
