= Mike Lenzly =

British basketball player

Personal information
- Born: 1 May 1981 (age 45) Oxford, England
- Listed height: 1.89 m (6 ft 2 in)
- Listed weight: 85 kg (187 lb)

Career information
- High school: Lovejoy (Hampton, Georgia)
- College: Wofford (1999–2003)
- NBA draft: 2003: undrafted
- Playing career: 2003–2013
- Position: Point guard / shooting guard

Career history
- 2003–2004: TBB Trier
- 2004–2005: Ventspils
- 2005–2006: Tenerife CB
- 2006–2007: APOEL
- 2007–2008: Dexia Mons-Hainaut
- 2008–2009: Scafati Basket
- 2009–2012: ČEZ Nymburk
- 2013: S.Oliver Baskets

Career highlights
- FIBA EuroCup All-Star Day (2008); 3× Czech NBL champion (2010–2012); 3× Czech Cup winner (2010–2012); Latvian League champion (2005)

Mike Lenzly (born 1 May 1981) is a British former professional basketball player. At a height of 1.89 m (6'2 1/2"), he played the point guard and shooting guard positions.

== Career ==
=== College ===
Lenzly attended Wofford College in Spartanburg, South Carolina. He played four seasons for the Terriers, before graduating in 2003. He was selected to the Wofford College Athletics Hall of Fame.

=== Professional ===
Lenzly played professional basketball for several European clubs. In 2005 he won the Latvian League championship with Ventspils. He was a part of the Dexia Mons-Hainaut team that made the final of the FIBA EuroChallenge's 2007–08 season. With ČEZ Nymburk, he won the Czech League and Czech Cup, in 2010, 2011, and 2012.

=== National ===
Lenzly was a member of the senior Great Britain national basketball team. He played with the team at the EuroBasket 2009, and averaged 6 points, 1.7 rebounds and 1 assist per tournament game. His best performance was 14 points, scored in the team's first-round loss to Spain. He also played at the EuroBasket 2011 and 2012 London Summer Olympics.
