= Wofford Terriers men's basketball =

2026–27 Wofford Terriers men's basketball team
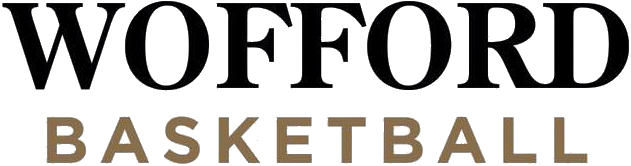
- College: Wofford College
- Head coach: Kevin Giltner (2nd season)
- Location: Spartanburg, South Carolina
- Arena: Jerry Richardson Indoor Stadium (capacity: 3,400)
- Conference: SoCon
- Nickname: Terriers
- Colors: Old gold and black

NCAA Division I tournament round of 32
- 2019

NCAA Division I tournament appearances
- 2010, 2011, 2014, 2015, 2019, 2025

Conference tournament champions
- 2010, 2011, 2014, 2015, 2019, 2025

Conference regular-season champions
- 2010, 2011, 2015, 2019

Uniforms
Home	Away	Alternate

The Wofford Terriers men's basketball team represents Wofford College in Spartanburg, South Carolina, United States, in Division I of the NCAA. The school's team competes in the Southern Conference. Wofford is currently coached by Kevin Giltner, who was hired after previous head coach Dwight Perry was let go in September 2025. Wofford plays its home games at Jerry Richardson Indoor Stadium, opened for the 2017–18 season as the replacement for Benjamin Johnson Arena. The Terriers have appeared six times in the NCAA Division I men's basketball tournament, most recently in 2025.

== History ==
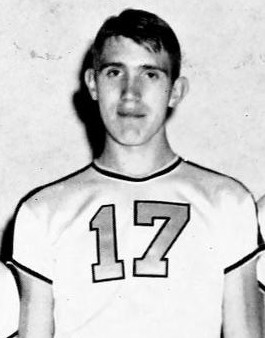
Jim Neal with Wofford in 1951

The Terriers have been playing Division I basketball in the Southern Conference since the 1997–98 season. They have won four regular season SoCon titles and six SoCon tournament championships and are one-time SoCon tournament runner-ups. The Terriers currently hold a 1–6 record in the NCAA tournament. Wofford has defeated various high major opponents during their 31 years in NCAA Division I. They have beaten North Carolina twice, South Carolina twice, Georgia twice, Clemson, Georgia Tech, NC State, Seton Hall, Purdue, Tulane, Wake Forest, Texas A&M, Cincinnati, Auburn, Virginia Tech, Air Force, George Mason, and Xavier since joining Division I for the 1995–96 season.

On March 8, 2010, the Terriers defeated Appalachian State to win the Southern Conference tournament, marking the first time Wofford qualified for the NCAA tournament. Although Wofford came within a possession of upsetting 4th seeded Wisconsin in the first round, they eventually lost, 49–53. The Terriers qualified for the NCAA tournament for the second time on March 7, 2011, winning the Southern Conference tournament over College of Charleston, 77–67, but they lost in the first round to BYU. Brad Loesing, point guard and 4.0 Phi Beta Kappa student, was selected first team Division I Academic All-American. In 2014, Wofford won the Southern Conference tournament and qualified for the NCAA tournament for the third time in five years, losing to Michigan in the second round. Wofford also won a spot in the 2015 NCAA tourney, going 28–6. In February 2016, Wofford set an NCAA record when it hit 17 of 21 shots from the three-point line against VMI. For the 2017 season, a new state-of-the-art basketball and volleyball arena, Jerry Richardson Indoor Stadium, opened on the Wofford campus. In the 2017–18 season, Wofford defeated the defending national champion North Carolina in Chapel Hill, the first Wofford win against a ranked opponent and the first win against a top 5 opponent in school history.

During the 2018–19 season, Wofford was nationally ranked for the first time in school history. The Terriers finished with a 30–5 record and 18–0 in the Southern Conference, the first undefeated SoCon season in the modern era. As a 7-seed in the NCAA tournament, they defeated 10th-seeded Seton Hall, 84–68, in the first round, and during the game, Wofford star shooting guard Fletcher Magee broke the all-time NCAA career record for three-pointers made. They went on to lose to Kentucky, 62–56, in the second round in a contest that garnered the second highest ratings of any game during the round of 32.

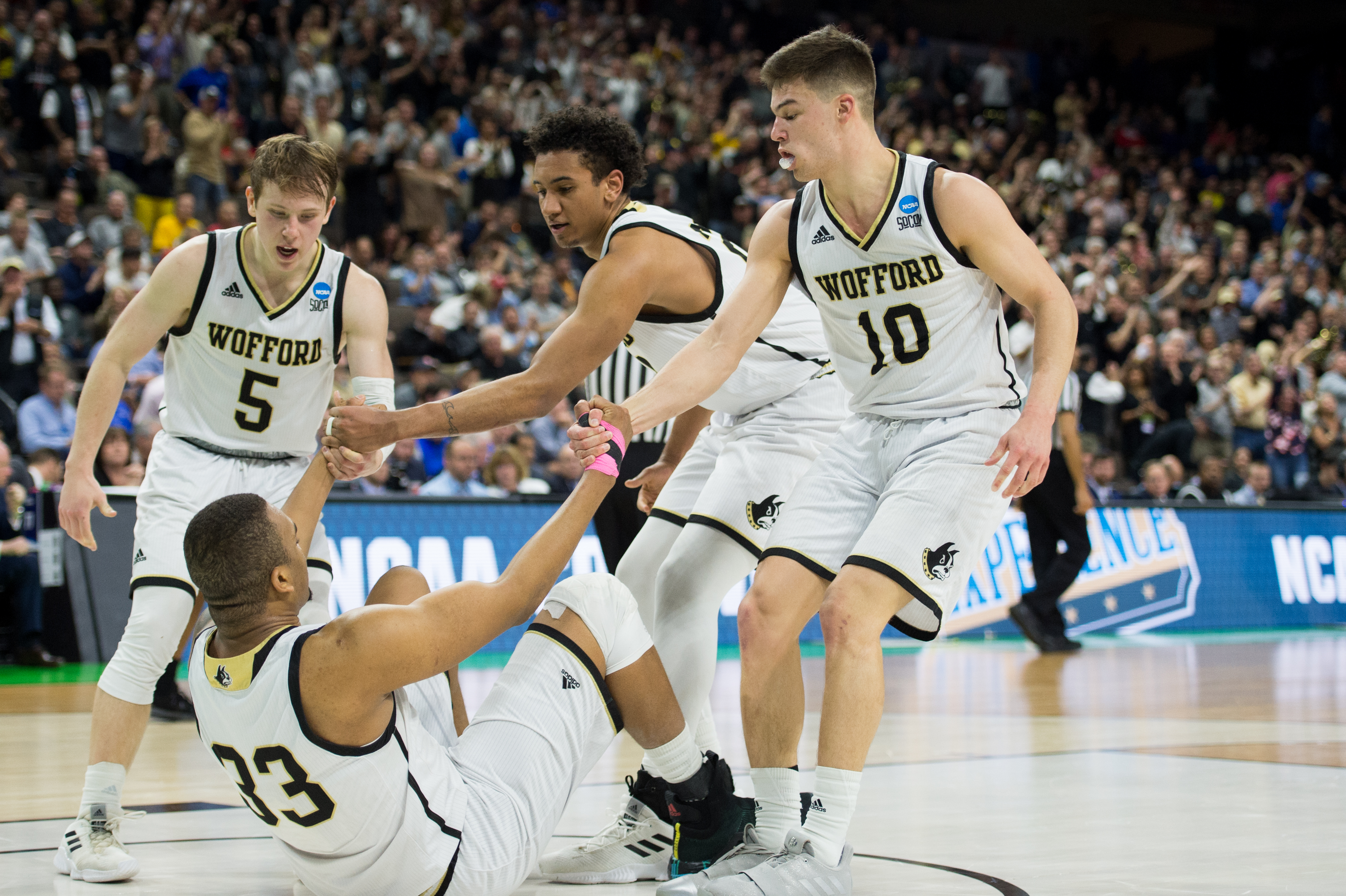
Wofford Terriers in the 2019 NCAA Tournament

Fletcher went on to win the 2019 Lou Henson Award, an award given annually by CollegeInsider.com to the most outstanding mid-major men's college basketball player in NCAA Division I competition. They spent the final five weeks in the AP top 25 poll, finishing at no. 19 in the final poll. Following the season, legendary Wofford basketball coach Mike Young was hired as the new head coach at Virginia Tech, with Jay McAuley taking over as Wofford head coach.

During the 2019–20 season, Wofford beat 17th ranked North Carolina in Chapel Hill for the second time in three years. They finished seventh in the Southern Conference during the regular season, but made a run in the Southern Conference tourney, appearing in their second straight SoCon title game, but losing to ETSU. The following season, 2020–21, was significantly shortened due to COVID-19, and no fans were allowed to attend games. Wofford finished second in the SoCon during the regular season, a half game back of UNCG. This sparked controversy as Wofford held a head-to-head advantage over UNCG, and Wofford was not allowed to make-up a game with Samford which had been postponed and later cancelled. As a 2-seed in the SoCon tournament, Wofford was upset by 7th-seed Mercer, losing, 62–61.

== NCAA Division I history ==
After two years as a Division I independent, Wofford joined the Southern Conference for the 1997–98 season.

Record table
Season	Coach	Overall	Conference	Standing	Postseason
Richard Johnson (Independent) (1995–1997)
1995–96	Richard Johnson	4–22			
1996–97	Richard Johnson	7–20			
Richard Johnson (Southern Conference) (1997–2002)
1997–98	Richard Johnson	9–18	6–8	T–2nd (South)	
1998–99	Richard Johnson	11–16	8–8	3rd (South)	
1999–00	Richard Johnson	14–16	8–8	3rd (South)	
2000–01	Richard Johnson	12–16	7–9	5th (South)	
2001–02	Richard Johnson	11–18	5–11	6th (South)	
Richard Johnson:		68–126	34–44		
Mike Young (Southern Conference) (2002–2019)
2002–03	Mike Young	14–15	8–8	T–3rd (South)	
2003–04	Mike Young	9–20	4–12	5th (South)	
2004–05	Mike Young	14–14	7–9	5th (South)	
2005–06	Mike Young	11–18	6–9	5th (South)	
2006–07	Mike Young	10–20	5–13	5th (South)	
2007–08	Mike Young	16–16	8–12	4th (South)	
2008–09	Mike Young	16–14	12–8	4th (South)	
2009–10	Mike Young	26–9	15–3	1st (South)	NCAA 1st Round
2010–11	Mike Young	21–13	14–4	T–1st (South)	NCAA 2nd Round
2011–12	Mike Young	19–14	12–6	T–2nd (South)	CBI 1st Round
2012–13	Mike Young	13–19	7–11	T–3rd (South)	
2013–14	Mike Young	20–13	11–5	T–3rd	NCAA 2nd Round
2014–15	Mike Young	28–7	16–2	1st	NCAA 2nd Round
2015–16	Mike Young	15–17	11–7	T–3rd	
2016–17	Mike Young	16–17	10–8	T–4th	
2017–18	Mike Young	21–13	11–7	T–4th	
2018–19	Mike Young	30–5	18–0	1st	NCAA 2nd Round
Mike Young:		299–244	175–124		
Jay McAuley (Southern Conference) (2019–2022)
2019–20	Jay McAuley	19–16	8–10	7th	
2020–21	Jay McAuley	15–9	12–5	2nd	
2021–22	Jay McAuley	19–13	10–8	T-3rd	TBC Withdrew^{[Note A]}
2022–23	Jay McAuley/Dwight Perry	17–16	8–10	6th	
Jay McAuley:		58–42	30–23		
Dwight Perry (Southern Conference) (2023–2025)
2023–24	Dwight Perry	17–15	10–8	T–5th	
2024–25	Dwight Perry	19–16	10–8	6th	NCAA Division I Round of 64
Dwight Perry:		48–43	28–26		
Kevin Giltner (Southern Conference) (2025–present)
2025–26	Kevin Giltner	19–13	11–7	T–2nd	
Kevin Giltner:		19–13	11–7		
Total:		492–468			
National champion Postseason invitational champion Conference regular season champion Conference regular season and conference tournament champion Division regular season champion Division regular season and conference tournament champion Conference tournament champion

^A. After initially accepting a bid to play in the 2022 The Basketball Classic, Wofford ultimately withdrew, ahead of their game against Youngstown State.

== Postseason ==
=== NCAA Division I tournament results ===
The Terriers have appeared in the NCAA Division I tournament six times. Their combined record is 1–6.

Year	Seed	Round	Opponent	Result
2010	#13	First Round	#4 Wisconsin	L 49–53
2011	#14	First Round	#3 BYU	L 66–74
2014	#15	First Round	#2 Michigan	L 40–57
2015	#12	First Round	#5 Arkansas	L 53–56
2019	#7	First Round; Second Round	#10 Seton Hall #2 Kentucky	W 84–68; L 56–62
2025	#15	First Round	#2 Tennessee	L 62–77

=== CBI results ===
The Terriers have appeared in the College Basketball Invitational (CBI) one time. Their record is 0–1.

Year	Round	Opponent	Result
2012	First Round	Pittsburgh	L 63–81

=== CIT results ===
The Terriers have appeared in the CollegeInsider.com Postseason Tournament (CIT) one time. Their record is 0–1.

Year	Round	Opponent	Result
2018	Second Round	Central Michigan	L 94–98

== National honors ==
=== Lou Henson Award - National Mid-Major Player of the Year ===
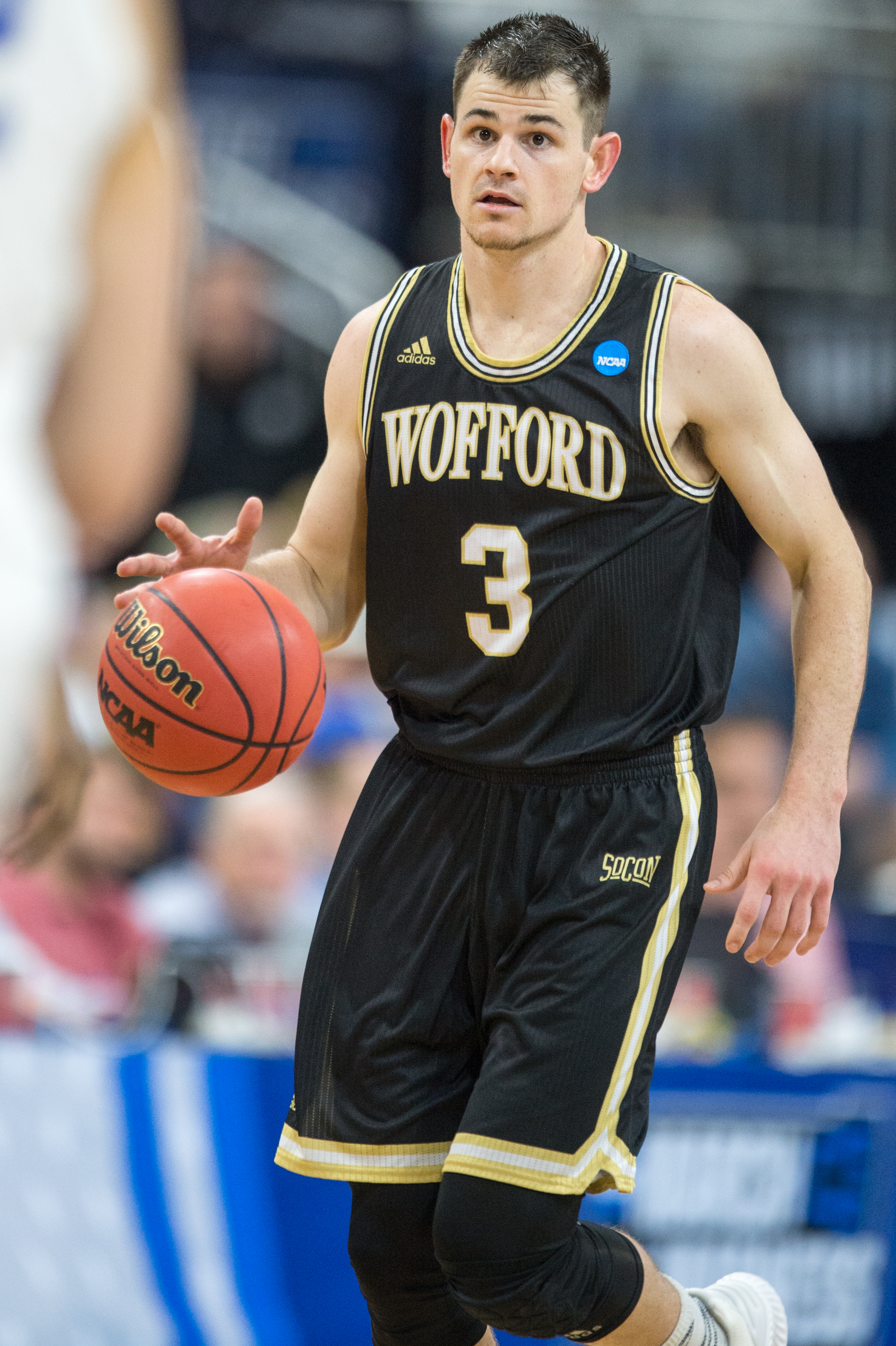
Fletcher Magee with Wofford in the 2019 NCAA tournament

Fletcher Magee (2018–19)

=== Sporting News - National Coach of the Year ===
Coach Mike Young (2018–19)

=== AP All-America Team ===
Noah Dahlman (2009–10)

Fletcher Magee (2017–18)

Fletcher Magee (2018–19)

=== National Association of Basketball Coaches - All-District First Team ===
Storm Murphy (2020–21)

Cameron Jackson (2018–19)

Fletcher Magee (2018–19)

Fletcher Magee (2017–18)

Eric Garcia (2016–17)

Spencer Collins (2015–16)

Karl Cochran (2014–15)

Karl Cochran (2013–14)

Brad Loesing (2011–12)

Noah Dahlman (2010–11)

Noah Dahlman (2009–10)

=== National Association of Basketball Coaches - All-District Second Team ===
Nathan Hoover (2019–20)

Lee Skinner (2014–15)

Lee Skinner (2013–14)

Karl Cochran (2012–13)

Kevin Giltner (2011–12)

Noah Dahlman (2008–09)

Junior Salters (2008–09)

=== US Basketball Writers Association - Player of the Week ===
Fletcher Magee (March 3, 2019)

=== Charleston Classic - All Tournament Team ===
Jamar Diggs (2010–11)

=== Chicago Invitational - All Tournament Team ===
Brad Loesing (2011–12)

== Academic honors ==
Academic All-America Team

Brad Loesing 2011–12 (1st Team)

Academic All-District Team

Brad Loesing 2011–12 (1st Team)

Brad Loesing 2010–11 (1st Team)

Greg O'Dell 1991–92

Harold Jackson 1981–82

== Southern Conference honors ==
=== Southern Conference Player of the Year ===
SoCon media first presented a player of the year award at the end of the 1951–52 season. The league's coaches began awarding their own version in 1989–90.

- Noah Dahlman: 2009–10 (coaches)
- Karl Cochran: 2014–15 (both)
- Fletcher Magee: 2017–18 (media), 2018–19 (both)

=== Southern Conference Defensive Player of the Year ===
- Brad Loesing: 2011–12

=== Southern Conference Freshman of the Year ===
SoCon media first presented a freshman of the year award at the end of the 1978–79 season. The league's coaches began awarding their own version in 1992–93.

- Ian Chadwick: 1997–98 (both)
- Karl Cochran: 2011–12 (both)
- Fletcher Magee: 2015–16 (both)

=== Southern Conference Coach of the Year ===
SoCon media have presented a coach of the year award since the 1946–47 season. The league's coaches began awarding their own version in 1988–89.

- Mike Young: 2009–10 (both), 2013–14 (media), 2014–15 (both), 2018–19 (both)

=== All–Southern Conference Team (Coaches) ===
Storm Murphy 2020–21 (1st Team)

Nathan Hoover 2019–20 (2nd Team)

Fletcher Magee 2018–19 (1st Team)

Cameron Jackson 2018–19 (1st Team)

Fletcher Magee 2017–18 (1st Team)

Cameron Jackson 2017–18 (2nd Team)

Fletcher Magee 2016–17 (1st Team)

Eric Garcia 2016–17 (1st Team)

Spencer Collins 2015–16

Karl Cochran 2014–15

Lee Skinner 2014–15

Karl Cochran 2013–14

Brad Loesing 2011–12

Kevin Giltner 2011–12

Noah Dahlman 2010–11

Noah Dahlman 2009–10

Tim Johnson 2009–10

Noah Dahlman 2008–09

Drew Gibson 2007–08

Howard Wilkerson 2005–06

Mike Lenzly 2002–03

Ian Chadwick 2000–01

Ian Chadwick 1999–00

Ian Chadwick 1998–99

=== All–Southern Conference Team (Media) ===
Storm Murphy 2020–21 (1st Team)

Nathan Hoover 2019–20 (3rd Team)

Fletcher Magee 2018–19 (1st Team)

Cameron Jackson 2018–19 (1st Team)

Fletcher Magee 2017–18 (1st Team)

Cameron Jackson 2017–18 (2nd Team)

Fletcher Magee 2016–17 (1st Team)

Eric Garcia 2016–17 (1st Team)

Spencer Collins 2015–16 (1st Team)

Karl Cochran 2014–15 (1st Team)

Lee Skinner 2014–15 (2nd Team)

Spencer Collins 2014–15 (3rd Team)

Karl Cochran 2013–14 (1st Team)

Lee Skinner 2013–14 (3rd Team)

Karl Cochran 2012–13 (2nd Team)

Brad Loesing 2011–12 (1st Team)

Kevin Giltner 2011–12 (2nd Team)

Noah Dahlman 2010–11 (1st Team)

Tim Johnson 2010–11 (3rd Team)

Cameron Rundles 2010–11 (3rd Team)

Noah Dahlman 2009–10 (1st Team)

Tim Johnson 2009–10 (3rd Team)

Jamar Diggs 2009–10 (3rd Team)

Noah Dahlman 2008–09 (1st Team)

Junior Salters 2008–09 (3rd Team)

Drew Gibson 2007–08 (3rd Team)

Shane Nichols 2005–06 (3rd Team)

Howard Wilkerson 2005–06 (2nd Team)

Tyler Berg 2004–05 (2nd Team)

Howard Wilkerson 2003–04 (3rd Team)

Lee Nixon 2002–03 (3rd Team)

Mike Lenzly 2002–03 (2nd Team)

Mike Lenzly 2001–02 (3rd Team)

Mike Lenzly 2000–01 (3rd Team)

Ian Chadwick 2000–01 (1st Team)

Ian Chadwick 1999–00 (1st Team)

Ian Chadwick 1998–99 (1st Team)

=== All–Southern Conference Freshman Team ===
Max Klesmit 2020–21

Morgan Safford 2020–21

Sam Godwin 2020–21

Messiah Jones 2019–20

Storm Murphy 2017–18

Nathan Hoover 2016–17

Fletcher Magee 2015–16

Eric Garcia 2013–14

Spencer Collins 2012–13

Karl Cochran 2011–12

Brad Loesing 2008–09

Junior Salters 2006–07

Tyler Berg 2002–03

Justin Stephens 2001–02

Ian Chadwick 1997–98

=== Southern Conference All–Tournament Team ===
Storm Murphy 2020–21 (2nd Team)

Chevez Goodwin 2019–20 (1st Team)

Storm Murphy 2019–20 (2nd Team)

Fletcher Magee 2018–19 (1st Team)

Nathan Hoover 2018–19 (1st Team)

Cameron Jackson 2018–19 (1st Team)

Fletcher Magee 2017–18 (1st Team)

Nathan Hoover 2017–18 (2nd Team)

Cameron Jackson 2018–19 (2nd Team)

Fletcher Magee 2015–16 (2nd Team)

Fletcher Magee 2015–16 (2nd Team)

Lee Skinner 2014–15 (1st Team)

Karl Cochran 2014–15 (1st Team)

Spencer Collins 2014–15 (1st Team)

Karl Cochran 2013–14 (1st Team)

Lee Skinner 2013–14 (1st Team)

Eric Garcia 2013–14 (2nd Team)

Noah Dahlman 2010–11 (1st Team)

Jamar Diggs 2010–11 (1st Team)

Cameron Rundles 2010–11 (1st Team)

Noah Dahlman 2009–10 (1st Team)

Jamar Diggs 2009–10 (1st Team)

Tim Johnson 2009–10 (2nd Team)

Cameron Rundles 2009–10 (2nd Team)

=== Southern Conference tournament Most Outstanding Player ===
- Noah Dahlman: 2010, 2011
- Karl Cochran: 2014
- Lee Skinner: 2015
- Fletcher Magee: 2019

== Individual season records ==
Category	Record	Name	Season
Minutes played	1265	Brad Loesing	2011–12
Minutes played Per Game	38.3	Brad Loesing	2011–12
Points	751	Fletcher Magee	2017–18
Points Per Game	32.6	Daddy Neal	1952–53
Field goals made	274	George Lyons	1963–64
Field goals Attempted	628	George Lyons	1963–64
Field Goal Percentage (min. 100 made)	72.5 (190–262)	Robert Mickle	1984–85
3–Pt Field Goals Made	158	Fletcher Magee	2018–19
3–Pt Field Goals Attempted	377	Fletcher Magee	2018–19
3–Pt Field Goal Percentage (min. 1.5/gm)	47.9 (91–190)	Fletcher Magee	2015–16
Free throws Made	224	Daddy Neal	1952–53
Free throws Attempted	338	Daddy Neal	1952–53
Free Throw Percentage (min. 2/gm)	93.0 (93–100)	Nathan Hoover	2019–20
Rebounds	609	Daddy Neal	1952–53
Rebounds per game	26.5	Daddy Neal	1952–53
Assists	226	Eric Garcia	2016–17
Assists Per Game	8.0	Robert Mickle	1983–84
Steals	107	Wayne Rice	1986–87
Blocked Shots	49	Kenny Hastie	2000–01

== Individual career records ==
Category	Record	Name	Seasons
Games played	138	Cameron Jackson	2014–19
Games Started	132	Spencer Collins	2012–16
Points	2521	George Lyons	1962–65
Points Per Game	23.3	Daddy Neal	1950–53
Field goals made	877	James Blair	1980–83
Field goals Attempted	1814	Karl Cochran	2011–15
Field Goal Percentage (min. 300 made)	66.4 (583–878)	Robert Mickle	1982–85
3–Pt Field Goals Made	509	Fletcher Magee	2015–19
3–Pt Field Goals Attempted	1169	Fletcher Magee	2015–19
3–Pt Field Goal Percentage (min. 100 attempts)	43.5 (509–1169)	Fletcher Magee	2015–19
Free throws Made	515	James Blair	1980–83
Free throws Attempted	721	James Blair	1980–83
Free Throw Percentage (min. 200 attempts)	90.8 (393–433)	Fletcher Magee	2015–19
Rebounds	1500	Daddy Neal	1950–53
Rebounds per game	19.8	Twitty Carpenter	1955–58
Assists	582	Antoine Saunders	1984–87
Assists Per Game	5.5	Antoine Saunders	1984–87
Steals	289	Wayne Rice	1984–87
Blocked Shots	137	Stephon Blanding	1987–90

== Individual single game records ==
Category	Record	Name	Opponent	Date
Points	57	Daddy Neal	Erskine	1952–53
Field goals Attempted	40	Daddy Neal	Erskine	1952–53
Field Goal Made	25	Daddy Neal	Erskine	1952–53
3–Pt Field Goals Attempted	19	Fletcher Magee	Chattanooga; Samford	2/17/18; 1/24/19
3–Pt Field Goals Made	11	Seth Chadwick; Fletcher Magee	Mercer; Chattanooga	2/15/97; 2/17/18
Free throws Attempted	24	Daddy Neal	Charleston	1/24/53
Free throws Made	22	Daddy Neal	Charleston	1/24/53
Rebounds	40	2–Tied		
Assists	15	Antoine Saunders	Allen	2/18/87
Steals	9	John Hawkins	Gardner–Webb	1/9/95
Blocked Shots	6	Cameron Jackson	North Carolina	12/20/17
