= Eric Garcia (basketball) =

American basketball player (born 1994)

No. 3 – Soles de Mexicali
- Position: Point guard
- League: LNBP

Personal information
- Born: October 5, 1994 (age 32) Aurora, Colorado, U.S.
- Listed height: 6 ft 0 in (1.83 m)
- Listed weight: 185 lb (84 kg)

Career information
- High school: Grandview (Aurora, Colorado)
- College: Wofford (2013–2017)
- NBA draft: 2017: undrafted
- Playing career: 2017–present

Career history
- 2017: MZT Skopje
- 2018: Kataja
- 2018–present: Södertälje Kings
- 2019–present: Soles de Mexicali

Eric Garcia (born October 5, 1994) is an American professional basketball player who currently plays for Soles de Mexicali of the LNBP. He played college basketball at Wofford College.

== College career ==
Garcia played for the Wofford Terriers from 2013 to 2017. In 33 games during his senior year, he averaged 14.0 points and 6.9 assists, and was sixth nationally in free-throw percentage at 92.1.

== Professional career ==
After graduating, Garcia had a workout with the Denver Nuggets in May 2017. On July 26, 2017, Garcia signed with the Adriatic League's MZT Skopje. He made his debut for the MZT Skopje in their season opener on September 29, 2017, scoring 17 points, two rebounds, nine assists and one steal in a 92–89 win over the Partizan. On November 22, 2017, he parted ways with MZT Skopje after averaging 11.1 points, 2.1 rebounds and 6.1 assists per game in the ABA League. On February 20, 2018, he signed with Kataja. In 2019 he is playing for Soles de Mexicali.
