= Fletcher Magee =

American basketball player (born 1996)

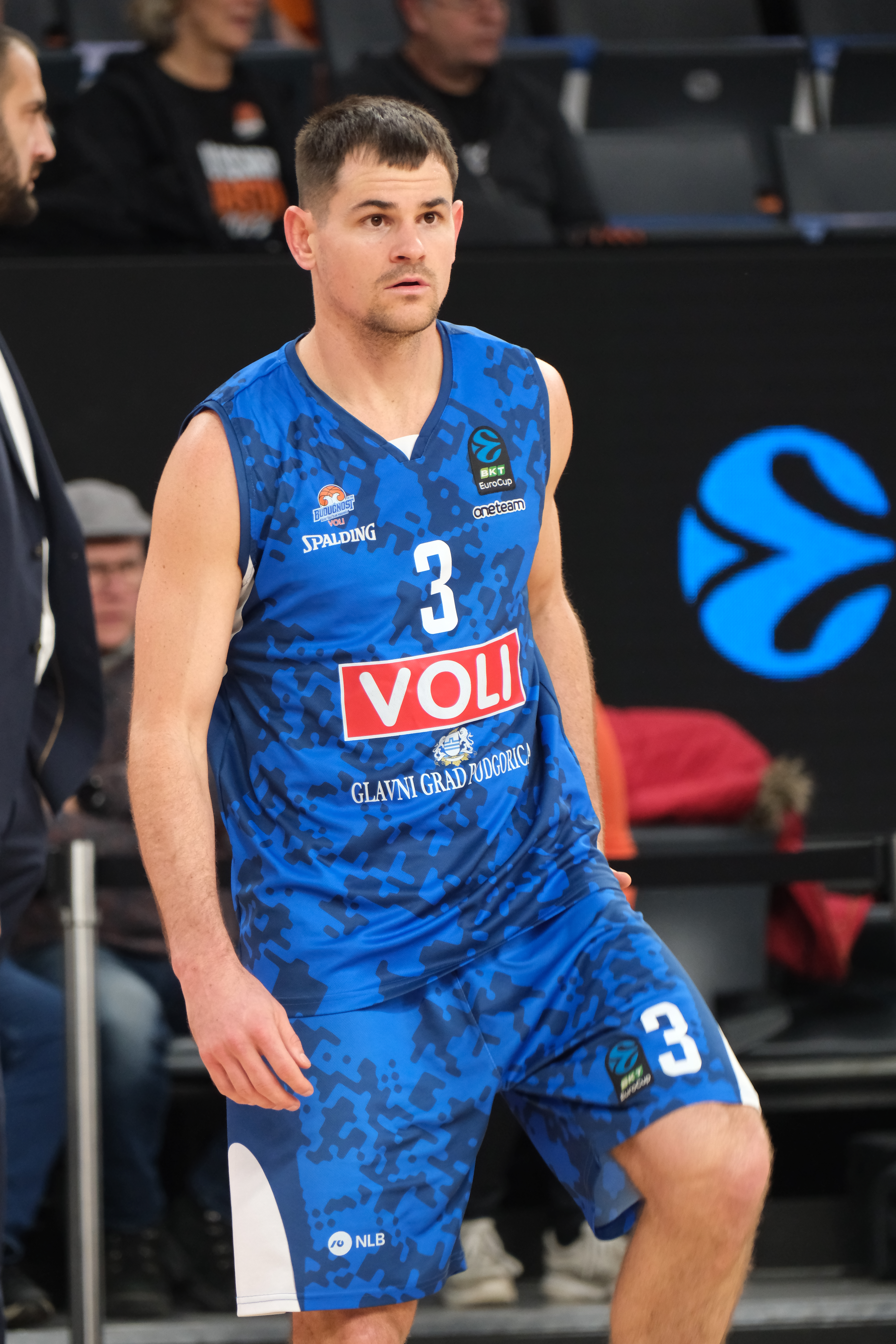
- Magee with KK Budućnost in January 2025

No. 3 – Budućnost Podgorica
- Position: Shooting guard
- League: ABA League; Montenegrin League

Personal information
- Born: November 13, 1996 (age 30) Orlando, Florida, U.S.
- Listed height: 6 ft 4 in (1.93 m)
- Listed weight: 200 lb (91 kg)

Career information
- High school: The First Academy (Orlando, Florida)
- College: Wofford (2015–2019)
- NBA draft: 2019: undrafted
- Playing career: 2019–present

Career history
- 2019–2020: Obradoiro
- 2020–present: Budućnost
- 2020–2023: →Studentski centar

Career highlights
- ABA League Second Division champion (2021); Montenegrin Cup winner (2025); Lou Henson Award (2019); 2× SoCon Player of the Year – Media (2018, 2019); SoCon Player of the Year – Coaches (2019); 3× First-team All-SoCon (2017–2019); SoCon Freshman of the Year (2016)

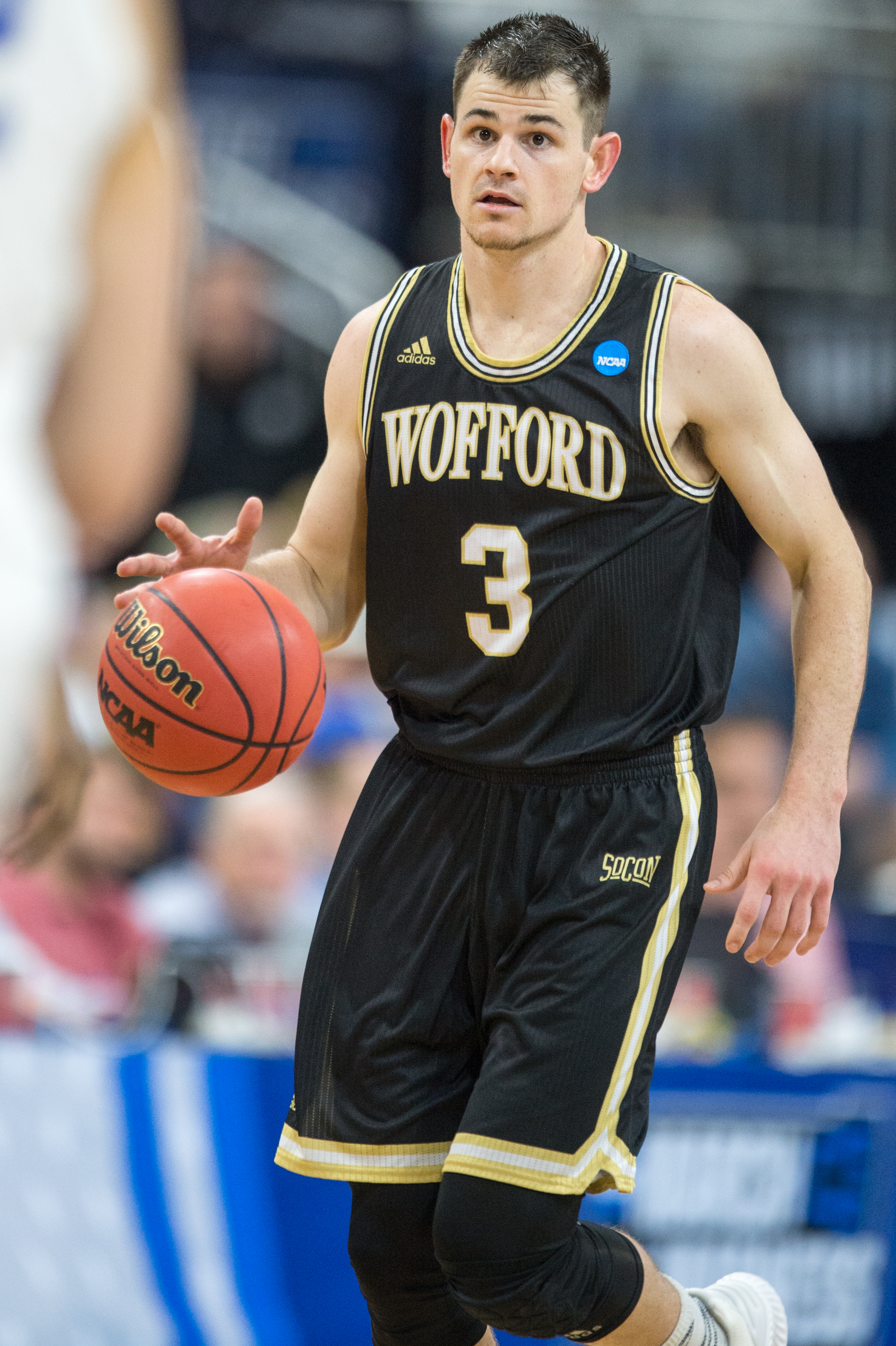

Fletcher Magee (born November 13, 1996) is an American basketball player for Budućnost Podgorica of the ABA League and the Prva A Liga. He played college basketball for Wofford College. While playing for the Terriers, he was named the Southern Conference Player of the Year by the league's media in consecutive years (2017–18 and 2018–19) and set the NCAA record for made three point shots in a career. His career NCAA three-point percentage of .435 and free throw percentage of .908 are among the highest ever.

== High school career ==
Magee played three sports at The First Academy in his native Orlando, Florida.

== College career ==
As a freshman for Wofford, he scored 13.8 points per game and led the Southern Conference (SoCon) in three-point shooting percentage. At the close of the season, he was named SoCon Freshman of the Year. As a sophomore, Magee raised his scoring average to 18.6 points per game and was named first-team all-conference.

As a junior, Magee led the SoCon in scoring at 22.1 points per game and again led the league in three-point percentage (.439). At the close of the season, he was awarded the Malcolm U. Pitt SoCon Player of the Year by the league media.

Following the 2017–18 season, Magee declared his intention to test the waters for the 2018 NBA draft. He did not hire an agent, leaving open the possibility of returning to Wofford for his senior year, which he did. Coming into his senior season, Magee was named preseason Southern Conference Player of the Year.

On December 9, 2018, Magee scored his 2,000th career point in a win over Coastal Carolina. At the close of the season, Magee was again named SoCon Player of the Year by the league's media, this time adding the Coaches' award to sweep top honors.

On March 21, 2019, against Seton Hall, Fletcher broke the all-time NCAA record for most career three point field goals, surpassing JJ Redick, Stephen Curry, and Travis Bader, who previously had 504, in the First Round of the NCAA tournament.

== Professional career ==
=== Obradoiro ===
After not being selected in the 2019 NBA draft, Magee was signed by the Milwaukee Bucks for NBA Summer League play.

On July 20, 2019, Magee signed his first professional deal with Monbus Obradoiro of the Liga ACB. Magee averaged 11.3 points, 1.1 assists and 1.7 rebounds per game.

=== Buducnost ===
On August 25, 2020, Magee signed with Budućnost of the Montenegrin Basketball League. He was subsequently loaned to Studentski centar.

=== The Basketball Tournament ===
Magee joined War Tampa, a team composed primarily of Auburn alumni in The Basketball Tournament 2020. He scored two points in a 76–53 loss to House of 'Paign in the first round.

== Career statistics ==
Legend
GP	Games played	GS	Games started	MPG	Minutes per game
FG%	Field goal percentage	3P%	3-point field goal percentage	FT%	Free throw percentage
RPG	Rebounds per game	APG	Assists per game	SPG	Steals per game
BPG	Blocks per game	PPG	Points per game	**Bold**	Career high

=== College ===
Year	Team	GP	GS	MPG	FG%	3P%	FT%	RPG	APG	SPG	BPG	PPG
2015–16	Wofford	32	22	28.8	.472	**.479**	**.925**	3.0	1.5	.4	.1	13.8
2016–17	Wofford	33	32	33.3	.438	.423	.893	**3.3**	**1.8**	.7	**.2**	18.6
2017–18	Wofford	34	34	**33.6**	**.484**	.439	.907	2.9	1.7	**.9**	.1	**22.1**
2018–19	Wofford	**35**	**35**	31.4	.439	.419	.910	2.5	1.6	.7	.1	20.3
Career		134	123	31.8	.457	.435	.908	3.0	1.6	.7	.1	18.8

== See also ==
- List of NCAA Division I men's basketball career 3-point scoring leaders
- List of NCAA Division I men's basketball season 3-point field goal leaders
