= Karl Cochran =

American basketball player (born 1992)

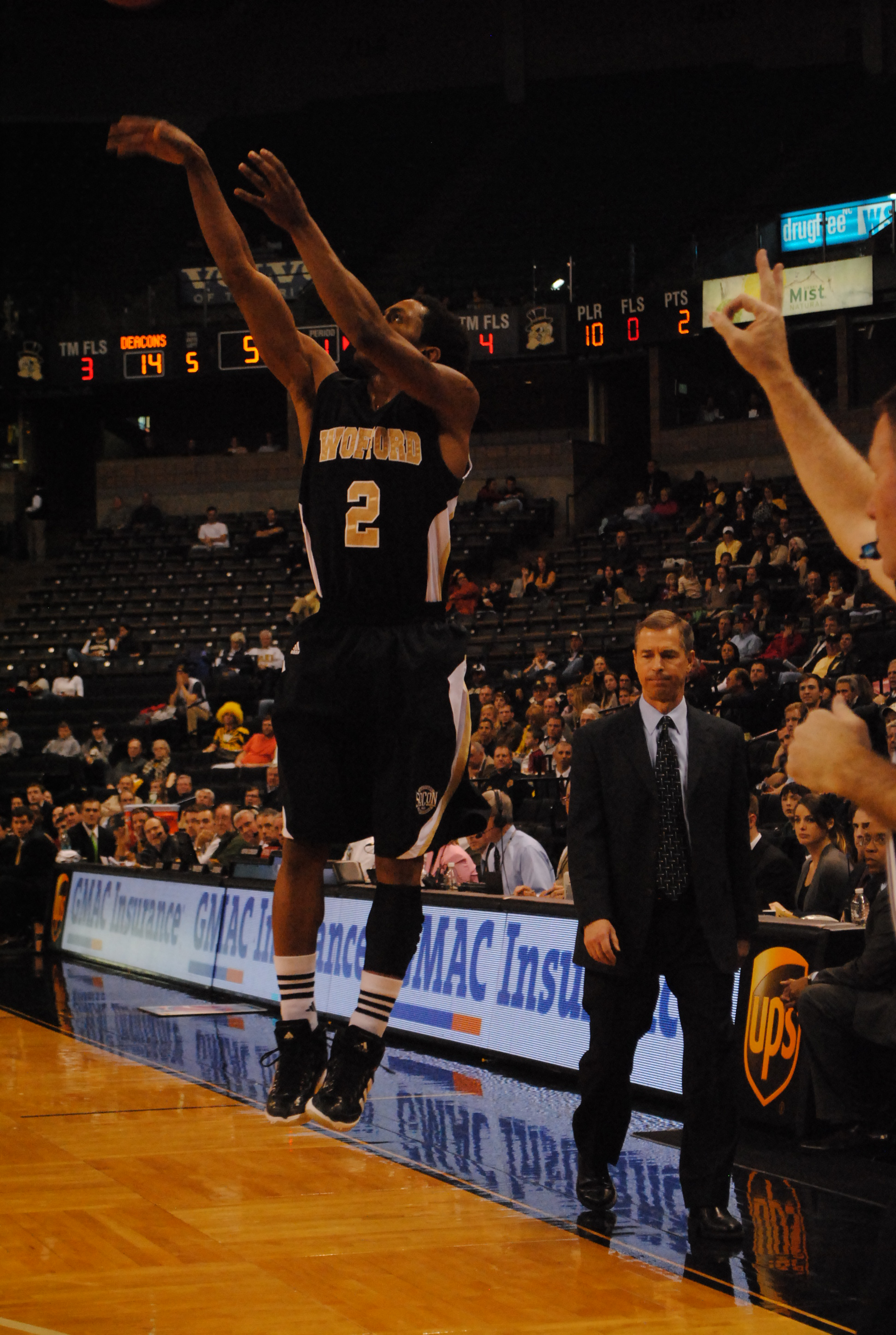
- Cochran playing for Wofford

BBC Monthey
- Position: Guard
- League: Championnat LNA

Personal information
- Born: September 7, 1992 (age 34) Marietta, Georgia, U.S.
- Listed height: 6 ft 1 in (1.85 m)
- Listed weight: 185 lb (84 kg)

Career information
- High school: Walton (Marietta, Georgia)
- College: Wofford (2011–2015)
- NBA draft: 2015: undrafted
- Playing career: 2015–present

Career history
- 2015–2016: Rio Grande Valley Vipers
- 2016–2017: BBC Lausanne
- 2017–2018: Penarol Mar del Plata
- 2018–2019: BBC Monthey

Career highlights
- SoCon Player of the Year (2015); First-team All-SoCon (2015)

Karl Cochran (born September 7, 1992) is an American professional basketball player for BBC Monthey of the Swiss Championnat LNA. He played college basketball for Wofford.

== Early life ==
Cochran attended Joseph Wheeler High School his first three seasons where he averaged he averaged 9.8 points per game and 4.8 rebounds per game as a junior. In his senior season he moved to Walton High School where he averaged 19.4 points per game, 3.1 blocks per game and 2.8 steals per game. He was named all-region and County Player of the Year.

== College career ==
He played college basketball for the Wofford Terriers. As a senior in 2014–15, Cochran averaged 15.0 points, 5.8 rebounds, 1.8 steals, and 2.8 assists per game. The guard was named the Southern Conference Player of the Year that year, joining Noah Dahlman as the only Wofford players to receive the distinction. Cochran is generally regarded as one of the best offensive and defensive players ever to play for Wofford.

== Professional career ==
On October 31, 2015, Cochran was selected by the Rio Grande Valley Vipers in the third round of the 2015 NBA Development League Draft. On November 23, he made his professional debut in a 123–117 win over the Delaware 87ers, recording one assist in three minutes off the bench.

On October 4, 2016, Cochran signed with BBC Lausanne of the Swiss League. He averaged 25 points per game that season and was considered perhaps the best defender in the league. In 2017, he signed to play for Penarol in Argentina.

== Personal life ==
The son of redacted, Cochran was an English major at Wofford.
