= Brad Loesing =

American-German basketball player

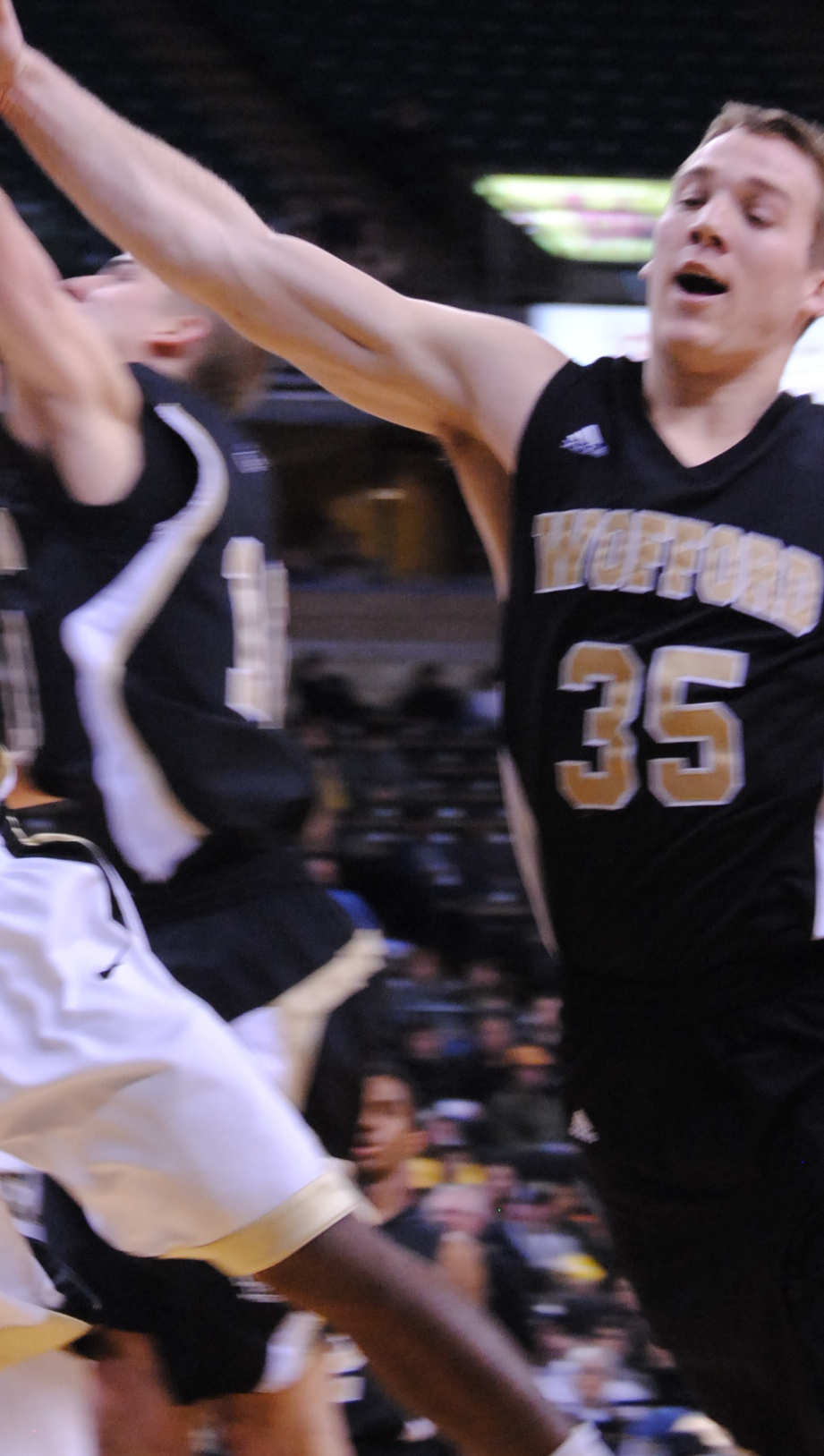

Free agent
- Position: Point guard

Personal information
- Born: October 9, 1989 (age 37) Cincinnati, Ohio, U.S.
- Listed height: 6 ft 0 in (1.83 m)
- Listed weight: 195 lb (88 kg)

Career information
- High school: St. Xavier (Cincinnati, Ohio)
- College: Wofford (2008–2012)
- NBA draft: 2012: undrafted
- Playing career: 2012–present

Career history
- 2012–2013: PVSK Panthers
- 2014–2017: Riesen Ludwigsburg
- 2014–2015: →Rockets Gotha
- 2017–2018: Oldenburg
- 2018–2019: Würzburg
- 2020–2022: Rostock Seawolves

Career highlights
- BBL All-Star (2016); First-team Academic All-American (2012); First-team All-SoCon (2012); SoCon Defensive Player of the Year (2012)

Brad Loesing (born October 9, 1989) is an American-German professional basketball player who last played for Rostock Seawolves of the ProA. As a senior at Wofford, he was selected as the 2012 Southern Conference Defensive Player of the Year and was named as a First Team Academic All-American in that 2011–12 season.

== Early life ==
Loesing is the second of five children from a German-Catholic family in Norwood, Ohio. After graduating from Holy Trinity School in Norwood, Loesing attended St. Xavier High School in Cincinnati. In his junior season, he led the St. Xavier Bombers basketball team to the Ohio Division I State Championship game. The Bombers fell to crosstown rival Archbishop Moeller High School with a final score of 43-40. The following summer, he earned his 9th consecutive AAU state championship title with the Cincinnati Shining Stars. He played on the same team as fellow Cincinnati natives Kyle Rudolph and Greg Scruggs, who both went on to careers in the NFL. Loesing graduated in 2008, after a successful senior season at St. Xavier.

== College career ==
As a freshman at Wofford College in Spartanburg, South Carolina, Loesing started 29 games at point guard for the Terriers basketball team and was named to the All-Southern Conference Freshman Team.

In his sophomore year, Loesing continued his integral role as point guard for the Terriers, leading the team to its first ever regular season Southern Conference Championship. Wofford went on to win the 2010 Southern Conference Tournament and earned its first ever berth into the NCAA Division I men's basketball tournament. That year, Loesing appeared on the cover of Sports Illustrated's March Madness edition, representing the Wofford Terriers.

Loesing and the Terriers repeated as Southern Conference regular season and tournament champions in 2011, defeating College of Charleston 77-67 in the conference championship. In addition to leading Wofford to its second consecutive NCAA Tournament berth, Loesing earned individual accolades in his junior season by being named to the Academic All-District Team.

In his senior season, Loesing had a breakout year as co-captain of the Terriers. Averaging 14.9 points, 5.6 assists, and 79.7% from the free throw line, Loesing led the team in each of these categories. He also averaged an astounding 38.3 minutes per game, which ranked 4th in the nation among Division I players. Due to his impressive season, Loesing was named SoCon Defensive Player of the Year as well as being named to the Coach's All-Conference Team and the Media's All-Conference First Team. Succeeding off the court as well, Loesing was one of five players in the nation named as a First Team Academic All-American, earning a 3.90 GPA in Business Economics.

Loesing finished his career at Wofford with numerous school records. Currently, he holds the all-time record at Wofford for minutes played in a season (1265), minutes averaged in a season (38.3), and he shares the record for games played and started in a season (35). He also ranks 2nd in games started (130), 2nd in career minutes played (3992), 3rd in games played (132), 4th in total assists (483), 4th in assists in a season (184), 5th in assists per game (3.7), and 9th in free throw percentage (.792). Loesing finished his career as a member of Wofford's "1,000 Point Club" and 38th in all-time scoring with 1,068 points.

== Professional career ==
After going undrafted in the 2012 NBA draft, Loesing signed to play with the PVSK Panthers in Pécs, Hungary where he started at point guard. In his season in Pécs, Loesing averaged 14.5 points and 4.5 assists per game.

Loesing signed with Landstede Basketbal in Zwolle, the Netherlands for the 2013-14 season. After tearing his ACL in a preseason game, Loesing was sidelined for the entire season.

On July 7, 2014, he signed a two-year contract with MHP Riesen Ludwigsburg. Before the season began, Loesing's contract was loaned to Oettinger Rockets Gotha for the 2014-15 season. With the Rockets, he averaged 10.9 points and 2.6 assists per game, ranking 3rd and 2nd on the team, respectively.

In the 2015–16 season, while with Ludwigsburg, Loesing was selected for the BBL All-Star Game.

On June 19, 2017, Loesing signed with EWE Baskets Oldenburg.

In July 2020, Loesing signed with the Rostock Seawolves.

== Personal ==
Loesing's sister Mackenzie played collegiately at the University of Buffalo.

Loesing's sister Anna attends Clemson University and is a member of Kappa Kappa Gamma.

At Wofford, Loesing was inducted into Phi Beta Kappa liberal arts honor society for his academic achievements.

Brad is also the founder and lead partner of the Brad Loesing Basketball Camp franchise, started in 2015.
