= Cameron Jackson =

American basketball player

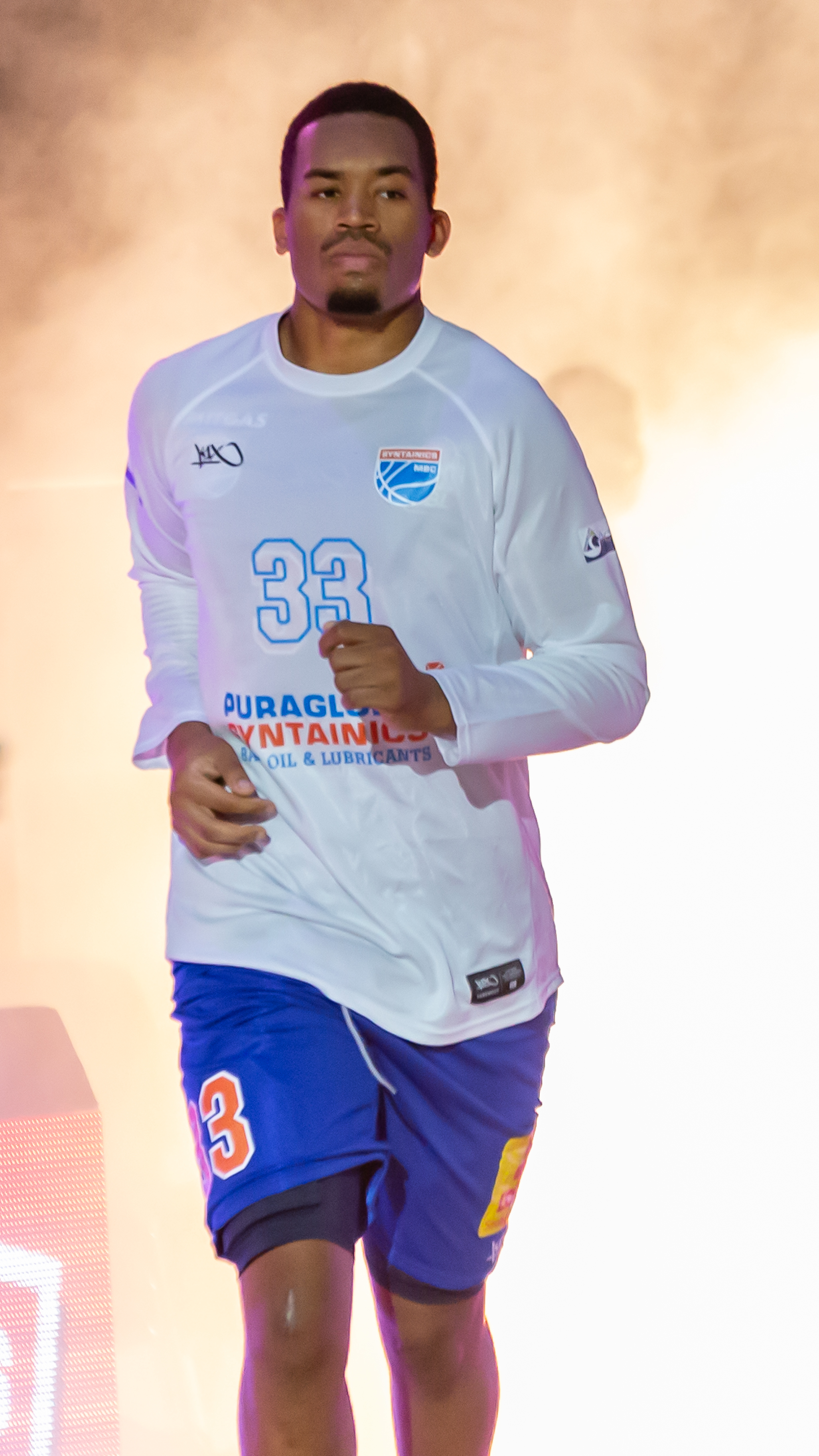
- Jackson with Mitteldeutscher.

Personal information
- Born: February 7, 1996 (age 30) Winchester, Virginia, U.S.
- Listed height: 6 ft 8 in (2.03 m)
- Listed weight: 250 lb (113 kg)

Career information
- High school: John Handley (Winchester, Virginia)
- College: Wofford (2014–2019)
- NBA draft: 2019: undrafted
- Playing career: 2019–present
- Position: Center

Career history
- 2019: Mitteldeutscher
- 2019–2020: Riesen Ludwigsburg
- 2020–2021: Benfica
- 2021–2022: Chieti Basket 1974
- 2022: WoCo Showtime
- 2023–2025: Bambitious Nara
- 2025: Yokohama B-Corsairs

Career highlights
- First-team All-SoCon (2019); Second-team All-SoCon (2018); Lou Henson National Player of the Week (2017)

Cameron Jackson (born February 7, 1996) is an American professional basketball player who last played for Yokohama B-Corsairs of the Japanese B.League. He played college basketball for the Wofford Terriers.

== High school career ==
Jackson attended John Handley High School in Winchester, Virginia. He was named Virginia High School Coaches Association Class 4 state Player of the Year as a senior. Jackson helped John Handley win the 4A North Region championship, posting 15 points, 10 rebounds and eight blocks in a 66–59 win in the title game against George Washington High School.

== College career ==
As a freshman at Wofford, Jackson averaged 2.4 points and 1.6 rebounds per game on a team that reached the 2015 NCAA Tournament. He suffered a knee injury during preseason practice and missed the first four games of his sophomore season. Jackson averaged 4.0 points and 3.9 rebounds per game in seven games, but suffered a fractured foot against Austin Peay on December 22, 2015, and coach Mike Young decided to sit him the remainder of the season and take a redshirt. As a redshirt sophomore, Jackson averaged 12.6 points (third on the team), 5.7 rebounds (second) and 1.5 assists per game and scored 25 points against VMI. He suffered back problems going into his junior season. On December 20, 2017, Jackson was named Lute Olson National Player of the Week after registering 18 points, nine rebounds, three assists, three steals and a school-record six blocks in the Terriers' 79–75 upset victory over fifth-ranked North Carolina. He was named to the Second Team All-Southern Conference as a junior and averaged 12.0 points and 5.9 rebounds per game.

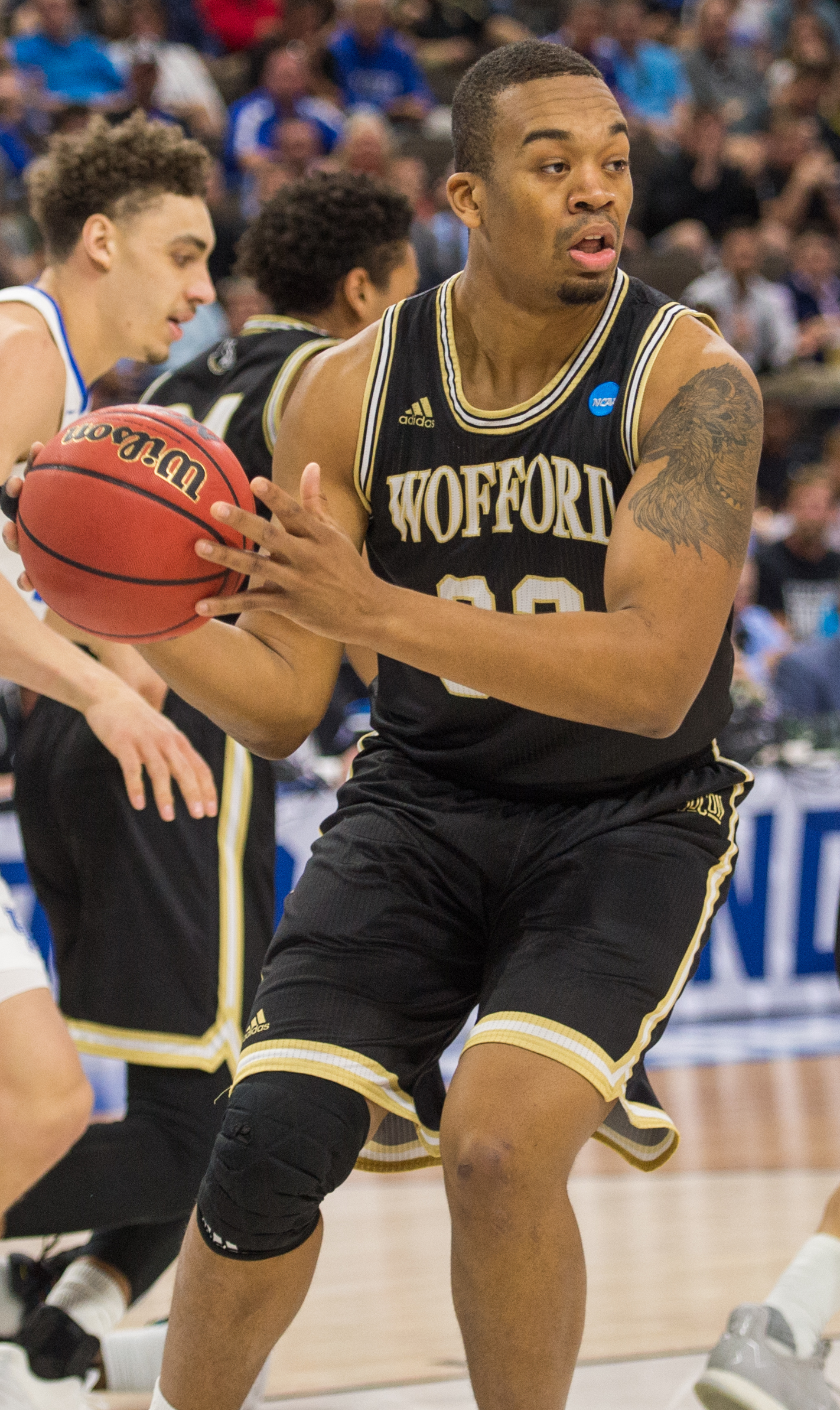
Jackson with Wofford in March 2019

Jackson scored a season-high 24 points and also pulled down nine rebounds in an 82–71 win against Coastal Carolina on December 9, 2018. As a senior, Jackson helped Wofford win the Southern Conference regular-season and tournament championships and achieve its first Associated Press Top 25 ranking in history and was named First-team All-SoCon. He had seven double-doubles, averaging 14.5 points and a team-high 7.6 rebounds per game. In the NCAA Tournament, Jackson posted 14 points and 10 rebounds in an 84–68 victory over Seton Hall for Wofford's first tournament win. He finished his college career as the Wofford leader with 138 games played, third in school history with 125 blocks, sixth in field goal percentage at 58.3 percent, sixth with 168 steals and 19th on the scoring list with 1,399 points.

== Professional career ==
On July 2, 2019, Jackson signed with Mitteldeutscher of the Basketball Bundesliga. Jackson's playing time declined after the team signed Joey Dorsey. He averaged 7.7 points, 3.8 rebounds and 1.2 steals per game in 10 games, shooting 61 percent from the field and 58 percent from the foul line. Jackson signed with MHP Riesen Ludwigsburg on December 17. He scored a season-high 17 points in an 85–78 win over Rasta Vechta on February 1, 2020. Jackson had six points in a 94–76 victory against Ratiopharm Ulm in Ludwigsburg's last game before the suspension of the season on March 8 because of the COVID-19 pandemic. In 12 games, he averaged 5.8 points and 3.4 rebounds per game. On August 12, Jackson signed with Benfica of the Portuguese Basketball League. On October 14, he was named player of the week after recording 14 points and 10 rebounds in a victory against CAB Madeira.
