= Wofford College =

Private college in Spartanburg, South Carolina, US

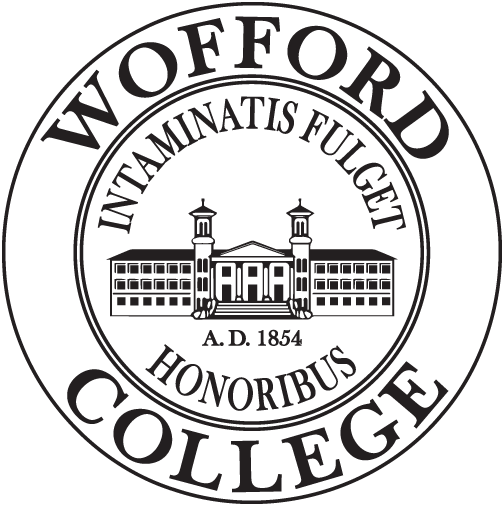
- Motto: Intaminatis fulget honoribus
- Motto in English: Untarnished, She Shines with Honor.
- Type: Private liberal arts college
- Established: 1854; 172 years ago
- Religious affiliation: United Methodist Church
- Academic affiliations: Annapolis Group; CIC; IAMSCU
- Endowment: $512.1 million (2025)
- President: Jay Dowd
- Faculty: 140 (fall 2021)
- Undergraduates: 1,800 (dec 2020)
- Location: Spartanburg, South Carolina, U.S. 34.959°N 81.935°W
- Campus: Suburban, 175 acres (71 ha)
- Colors: Gold & black
- Nickname: Terriers
- Sporting affiliations: Division I – SoCon
- Mascot: Terrier
- Website: wofford.edu
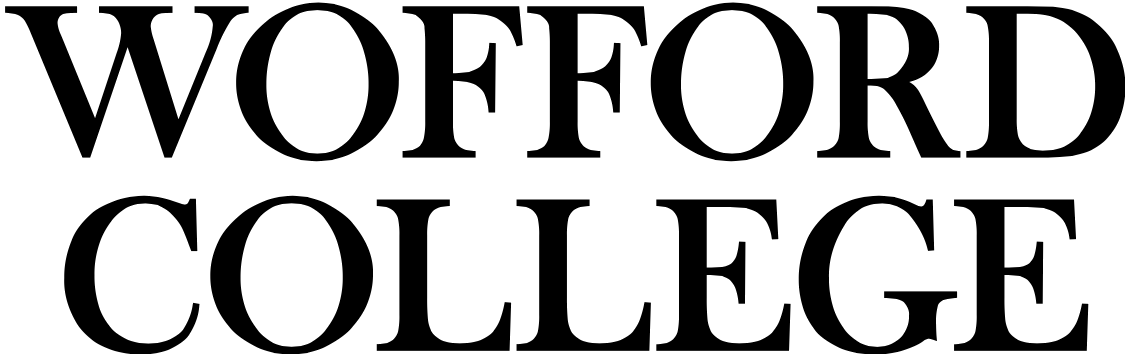

Wofford College is a private liberal arts college in Spartanburg, South Carolina, United States. Founded in 1854, it is one of the few four-year institutions in the southeastern United States founded before the American Civil War that still operates on its original campus. The 175-acre (71 ha) campus is a national arboretum.

Wofford was founded with a bequest of $100,000 from Benjamin Wofford, a Methodist minister and Spartanburg native who sought to create a college for "literary, classical, and scientific education in my native district of Spartanburg." The college's Main Building is the oldest structure on campus and was designed by the noted Charleston architect Edward C. Jones. In 1941, the college was awarded a chapter of the honor society Phi Beta Kappa, and the Beta of South Carolina chapter was the first at a private college in South Carolina.

== Wofford College Historic District ==
- Wofford College Historic District
- U.S. National Register of Historic Places
- U.S. Historic district
- Location within South Carolina Location within the United States
- Location: Wofford College campus, Spartanburg, South Carolina
- Area: 30 acres (12 ha)
- Built: 1854
- Architect: Edward C. Jones
- Architectural style: Italianate, Georgian
- NRHP reference No.: 74001879
- Added to NRHP: December 27, 1974

The Wofford College Historic District consists of the Main Building, which was designed by Edward C. Jones in the Italianate style, and six two-story brick residences. It was listed in the National Register of Historic Places in 1974. Construction of the Main Building began in 1852, and the first classes were held in the fall of 1854. The Wofford campus is designated as a national arboretum.

== Endowment ==
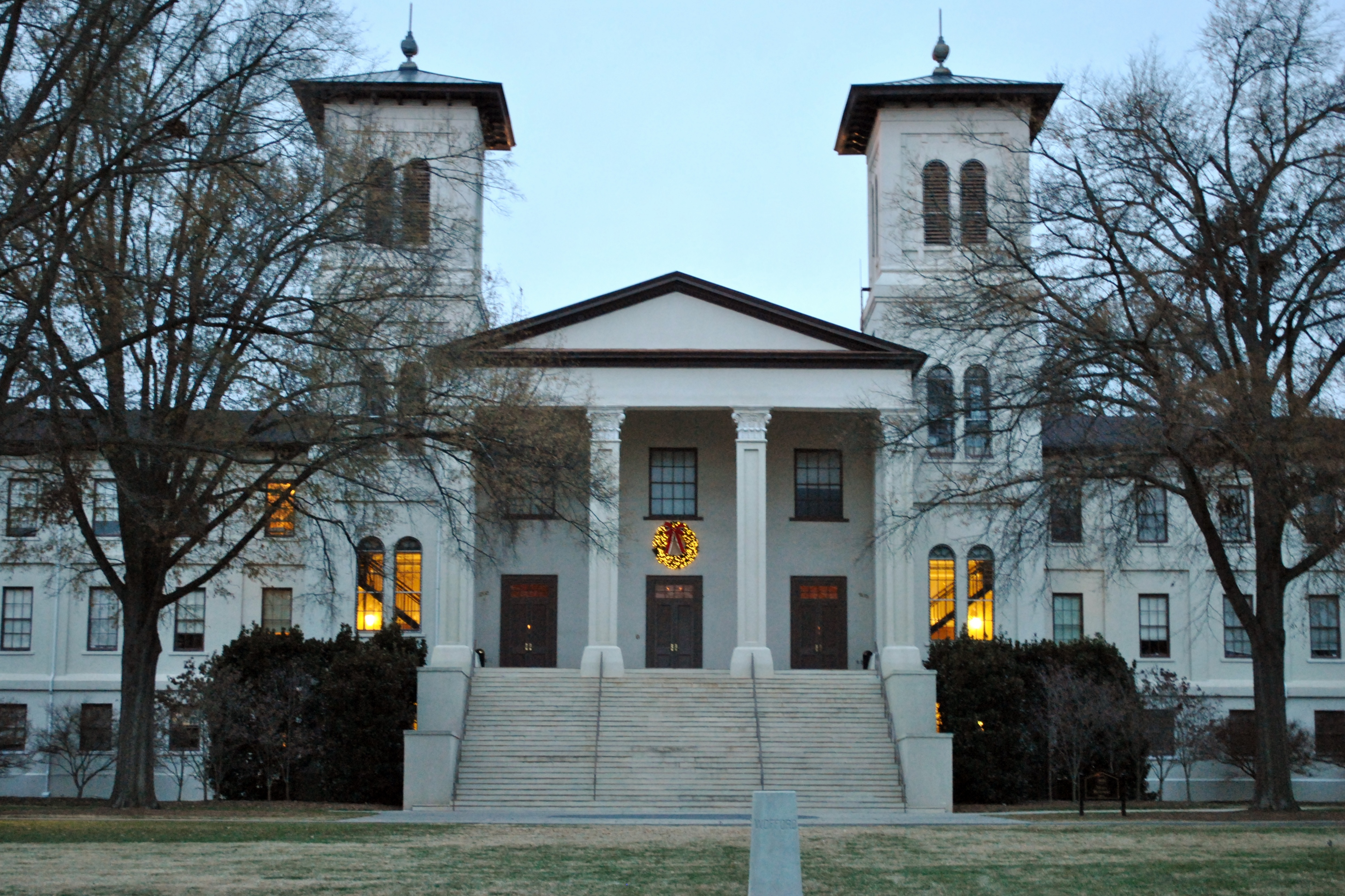
Main building, built in 1854

During the Civil War, the endowment was invested in Confederate bonds and other securities, which became worthless by the end of the war.

In February 2021, Jerry Richardson, alumnus and founding owner of the Carolina Panthers, donated $150 million to the college's endowment, which, according to Wofford statements, exceeds $400 million.

== Academics ==
The academic year consists of a four-month fall semester, a one-month January term called the Interim, and a four-month spring semester.

=== Faculty ===
136 full-time faculty teach at the college, 92 percent of whom have earned a doctorate or equivalent terminal degree. The FTE faculty-to-student ratio is 1:11.

=== Majors and minors ===
Wofford offers academic majors in a variety of areas including 27 majors.

The college also offers pre-professional programs in teacher education (secondary certification), dentistry, medicine, law, ministry, engineering, and veterinary science. The college's Army ROTC program was established in 1919.

=== Interim program ===
The Interim program is designed to provide students with opportunities to gain new experiences outside the realm of traditional academics and allows students to become involved in departments outside their academic majors. Interims generally fall into one of four categories. In the most common type, students enroll in faculty-proposed projects on campus. These projects range from participation in theatre to pottery, knitting, and short story writing. Students may elect to enroll in internship projects that are supervised by faculty but involve working off-campus in legal, medical, dental, congressional, corporate, or non-profit settings. Students may propose independent research projects under the supervision of a faculty sponsor. Finally, faculty-led travel projects take groups of students and professors to study in other parts of the United States or in Europe, Asia, Africa, South America, or Australia. Recent travel projects have included studies in England and Ireland, South Africa, Peru, Brazil, Belize, Vietnam, China, and Japan.

=== International programs ===
The college's Office of International Programs helps students select from over 200 study abroad programs in 59 countries. Wofford consistently ranks in the nation's top ten in the Institute of International Education Open Doors Survey, which is based on comparing the number of students earning credits abroad in a given year to the number of students in the graduating class. Wofford's 2009 score was 93%, compared to the Lincoln Commission national average of 9% of graduates earning credits abroad. The college has had six Fulbright English Teaching assistantships in the past four years as well as two Rotary Ambassadorial Scholarships. In 2012, Rachel Woodlee was selected as Wofford's sixth Rhodes Scholar.

=== Reputation and rankings ===
Academic rankings

Liberal arts
- U.S. News & World Report: 59 (tie) of 185
- Washington Monthly: 97 of 199

National
- Forbes: 190 of 500
- WSJ/College Pulse: 90 of 400

Wofford is tied for 59 of 199 in U.S. News & World Report's list of the best national liberal arts colleges.

Forbes ranked Wofford 190th out of the top 500 rated private and public colleges and universities in America for the 2024–25 report. Wofford was also ranked 43rd among liberal arts universities and 45th in the south.

== Athletics ==
Logo used to represent Wofford Athletics

The Wofford Terriers compete in NCAA Division I in the Southern Conference. Wofford's colors are old gold and black. The school mascot is the Terrier. In the 2010 NCAA Division I graduation success report, 9 of 13 Wofford teams posted GRS scores of 100, the highest available mark. For the past 16 years, the Carolina Panthers have made their summer training camp home at Wofford. The Shrine Bowl of the Carolinas (a high school all-star football game) is played at Wofford's Gibbs Stadium. Boss, a Boston Terrier, is the mascot for Wofford's teams.

== Student life ==
Wofford offers a self-contained environment (93% of students live on campus). The Village apartment-style housing for the senior class was a 2008 "Dorm of Distinction" as chosen by University Business Magazine.

=== Student organizations ===
Students participate in various service, pre-professional, religious, social, and other student organizations. Student publications at the college started with a literary magazine first published in 1889. The student newspaper, the Old Gold and Black, is published every other week; the yearbook is called The Bohemian. Delta Phi Alpha, the national collegiate German honorary society, was founded at Wofford, as was the National Beta Club, an honorary society prominent in American high schools.

In 1941, the college was awarded a chapter of the academic honor society Phi Beta Kappa. This was the first chapter at a private college in South Carolina.

=== Service learning ===
Wofford has a variety of student service organizations on campus, including the Bonner Scholars, and ONE.

=== Fraternities and sororities ===
Wofford College is home to 14 chartered Greek-letter organizations. These chapters consist of 4 National Panhellenic sororities, 6 Interfraternity Conference fraternities, and 4 National Pan-Hellenic organizations. Around half the student body participates in Greek life.

=== Diversity ===
In each of the years from 1901 through 1904, two women graduated from Wofford. In 1964, Wofford became the first private college in South Carolina to desegregate voluntarily with the admission of Albert Gray. Slightly more than half of current students are female, and there are numerous NCAA Division 1 varsity sports teams for men and women.

== Alumni ==
=== Academia ===
- William Stanley Hoole (1903–1990), University of Alabama dean of university libraries and professor of library service
- Paige West, anthropologist at Columbia University and Barnard College, 2021 Guggenheim Fellow
- Joe Pickens, president of St. Johns River State College and former Florida State congressman

=== Athletics ===
- Brenton Bersin, professional football player
- Fisher DeBerry, college football coach
- Robert Galloway, professional tennis player
- Eric Garcia, professional basketball player
- Forrest Lasso, professional soccer player
- Brad Loesing, professional basketball player
- Fletcher Magee, professional basketball player
- William McGirt, professional golfer
- Andrew Novak, professional golfer
- Danny Morrison, president of the Carolina Panthers NFL football team
- Ameet Pall, professional football player
- Kasey Redfern, professional football player
- Jerry Richardson, professional football player and team owner
- Nate Woody, professional and college football coach

=== Business ===
- George Dean Johnson, Jr., banker
- Jerry Richardson, restaurant franchise owner
- Charles Jeter, founder of Team Racing Auto Circuit and North Carolina congressman
- Jude Reyes, billionaire

=== Education ===
- William Preston Few, first and longest serving president of Duke University and the fifth and last president of its predecessor, Trinity College
- James Kirkland, second and longest-serving chancellor of Vanderbilt University
- James A. Knight, psychiatrist, theologian, and medical ethicist; first dean of the Texas A&M School of Medicine

=== Entertainment ===
- Ellison Barber, journalist
- Jesse Cole, creator of banana ball and commissioner of the Banana Ball Championship League.
- Craig Melvin, journalist
- Wendi Nix, journalist

=== Politics, law, and public service ===
- Paul S. Atkins, commissioner of the U.S. Securities and Exchange Commission
- Ken Ard, 88th lieutenant governor of South Carolina
- Ibra C. Blackwood, governor of South Carolina (1931–1935)
- Adam Bowling, member of the Kentucky House of Representatives
- Pat Cannon, congressman from Florida's 4th District
- Michael J. Copps, former commissioner of the Federal Communications Commission
- Samuel Dibble, member of the U.S. House of Representatives and the first graduate of Wofford College (Class of 1856)
- J. Edwin Ellerbe, congressman from South Carolina's 6th Congressional District
- William Haselden Ellerbe, governor of South Carolina (1897–1899)
- Henry F. Floyd, judge on the United States Court of Appeals for the Fourth Circuit
- Donald Fowler, former chairman of the Democratic National Committee
- Clyde H. Hamilton, judge of the U.S. Court of Appeals for the Fourth Circuit
- Van Hipp Jr., conservative commentator
- Joseph C. Hutchinson, lieutenant general in the Florida National Guard and Chairman of the Seminole County Commission in 1960–1964
- Olin D. Johnston, former United States senator, South Carolina (1945–1965); governor of South Carolina (1935–1939, 1943–1945)
- John Jenrette, member of the U.S. House of Representatives from South Carolina's 6th District
- C. Bruce Littlejohn, associate justice South Carolina Supreme Court (1966–1984); chief justice (1984–1985)
- Thomas Gordon McLeod, governor of South Carolina (1923–1927)
- John J. McSwain, congressman from South Carolina's 4th Congressional District
- Samuel J. Nicholls, congressman from South Carolina's 2nd Congressional District
- Costa M. Pleicones, associate justice, later chief justice, of the South Carolina Supreme Court since 2000
- John J. Riley, congressman from South Carolina's 2nd Congressional District
- Dennis W. Shedd, judge on the U.S. Court of Appeals for the Fourth Circuit
- Hugo S. Sims Jr., congressman from South Carolina's 2nd Congressional District
- Ellison D. Smith, former United States senator, South Carolina (1909–1945: 17th longest-serving senator in history)
- John G. Stabler, associate justice South Carolina Supreme Court (1926–1935); chief justice (1935–1940)
- Philip H. Stoll, congressman from South Carolina's 6th Congressional District
- Charles Albert Woods, associate justice South Carolina Supreme Court (1903–1913); judge on the U.S. Court of Appeals for the Fourth Circuit (1913–1925)

=== Religion ===
- William Wallace Duncan, bishop in the Methodist Episcopal Church, South
- Francis L. Garrett, chief of chaplains of the U.S. Navy
- Marion J. Hatchett, liturgical scholar in the Episcopal Church who helped to shape the 1979 Book of Common Prayer
- Albert C. Outler, theologian and philosopher
- William H. Willimon, author, Duke University chaplain, minister, and bishop in the United Methodist Church

== Gallery ==
Additional images
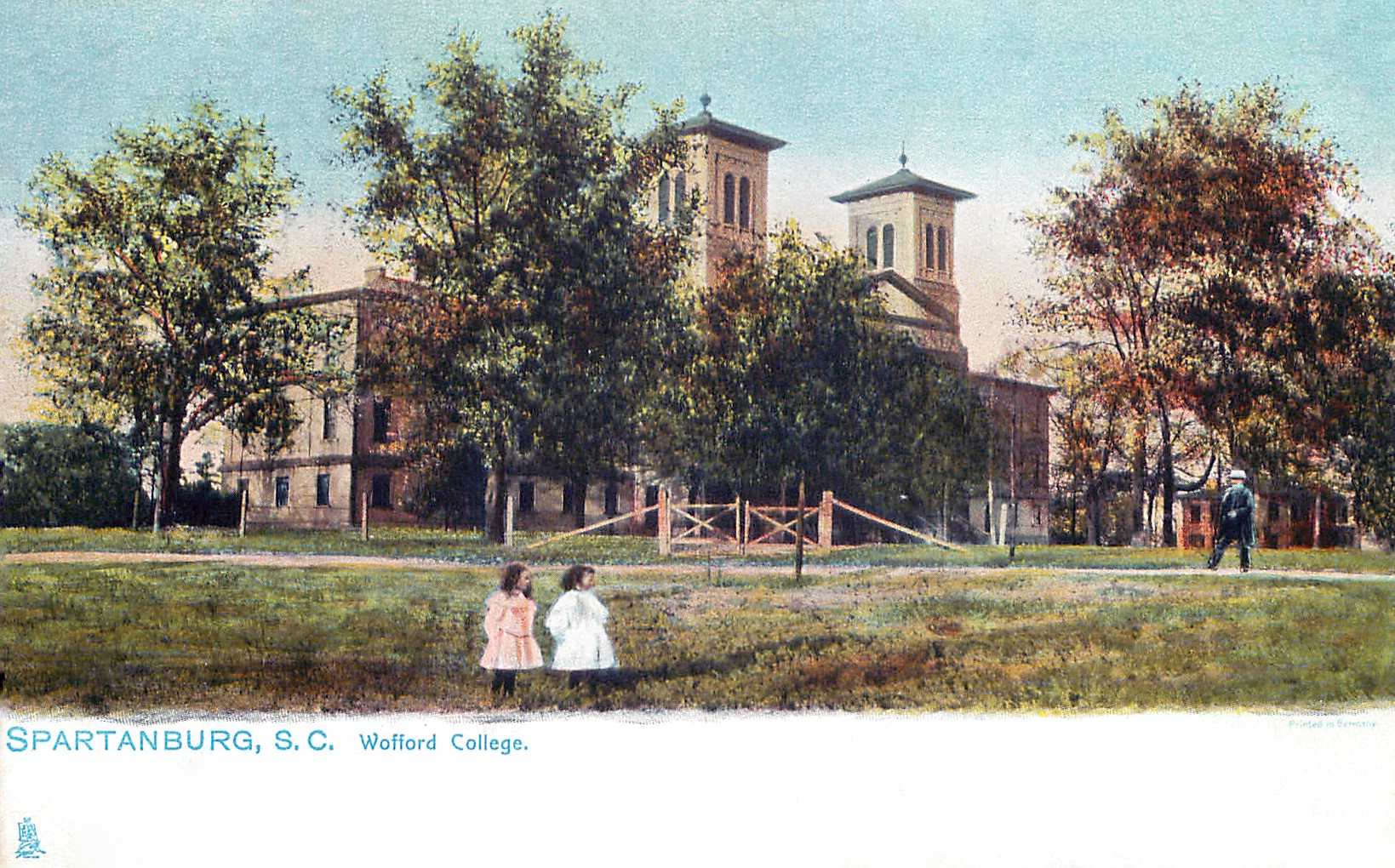
Wofford College in 1905

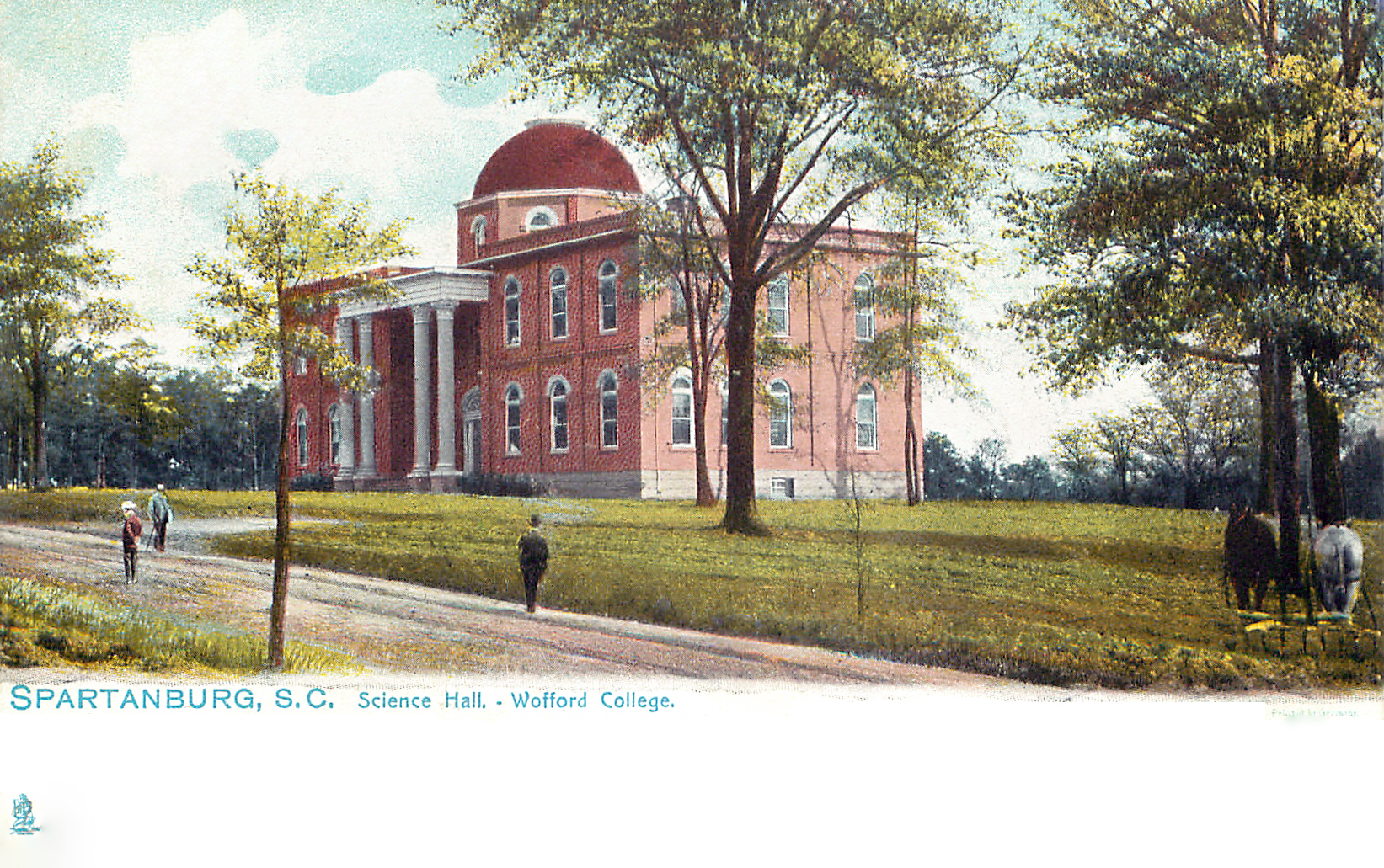
Science Hall, 1905 (since demolished)
