= 2011–12 South Florida Bulls men's basketball team =

American college basketball season

2011–12 South Florida Bulls men's basketball

NCAA Tournament, Round of 32
- Conference: Big East Conference
- Record: 22–14 (12–6 Big East)
- Head coach: Stan Heath
- Assistant coaches: Andy Hipsher; Steve Roccaforte; Eric Skeeters
- Home arena: Tampa Bay Times Forum; Bob Martinez Sports Center; Lakeland Center

2011–12 Big East men's basketball standings
| | Conf. | | | | Overall |
| Team | W | | L | PCT | W | | L | PCT |
|---|---|---|---|---|---|---|---|---|
| No. 11 Marquette | 14 | – | 4 | .778 | 27 | – | 8 | .771 |
| Notre Dame | 13 | – | 5 | .722 | 22 | – | 12 | .647 |
| Cincinnati | 12 | – | 6 | .667 | 26 | – | 11 | .703 |
| No. 15 Georgetown | 12 | – | 6 | .667 | 24 | – | 9 | .727 |
| South Florida | 12 | – | 6 | .667 | 22 | – | 14 | .611 |
| West Virginia | 9 | – | 9 | .500 | 19 | – | 14 | .576 |
| Connecticut | 8 | – | 10 | .444 | 20 | – | 14 | .588 |
| Seton Hall | 8 | – | 10 | .444 | 21 | – | 13 | .618 |
| Rutgers | 6 | – | 12 | .333 | 14 | – | 18 | .438 |
| St. John's | 6 | – | 12 | .333 | 13 | – | 19 | .406 |
| Pittsburgh | 5 | – | 13 | .278 | 22 | – | 17 | .564 |
| Villanova | 5 | – | 13 | .278 | 13 | – | 19 | .406 |
| Providence | 4 | – | 14 | .222 | 15 | – | 17 | .469 |
| DePaul | 3 | – | 15 | .167 | 12 | – | 19 | .387 |
| *No. 2 Syracuse | 0 | – | 1 | .000 | 0 | – | 3 | .000 |
| **No. 17 Louisville† | 0 | – | 8 | .000 | 0 | – | 10 | .000 |
† 2012 Big East tournament winner As of March 31, 2012; *Syracuse: 30 reg. season games, 4 postseason games vacated due to sanctions against the program; Disputed record: Syracuse–(34–3)(17–1) **Louisville: 25 reg. season games, 5 postseason games vacated due to sanctions against the program; Disputed record: Louisville–(30-10)(10-8); Rankings from AP Poll

The 2011–12 South Florida Bulls men's basketball team represented the University of South Florida Bulls during the 2011–12 NCAA Division I men's basketball season. This was the 41st season of basketball for USF and its 7th season as a member of the Big East Conference. The team was coached by Stan Heath in his fifth year at the school. USF played its home games at Bob Martinez Sports Center, Lakeland Center, and Tampa Bay Times Forum (formerly St. Pete Times Forum prior to January 1, 2012) this season as their regular home venue, the USF Sun Dome, was under extensive renovations.

== Off season ==
In June, USF received approval to begin a $35.6 million renovation on the USF Sun Dome, which was completed in April 2012.

In September, the Muma Basketball Center was officially opened, giving the basketball programs at USF a state of the art training facility.

At Big East Media day, USF was selected to finish in 14th place in the Big East Preseason Coaches' Poll. Augustus Gilchrist was selected as a 2011–12 Preseason All-BIG EAST Honorable Mention.

== Season Highlights ==
During the season, three USF players were honored by the Big East for their play. Jawanza Poland was named to the Big East Weekly Honor Roll on January 23, and Hugh Robertson received the same honor on February 13. Freshman Point Guard Anthony Collins was named the Big East Rookie of the Week on February 20, and a week later was named to the Big East Weekly Honor Roll on February 27.

At the conclusion of the regular season, Head Coach Stan Heath was named the Big East Coach of the Year. This was the first individual post-season award USF has received in the Big East. Anthony Collins was named to the Big East All-Rookie Team.

USF finished the regular season with a 19–12 overall record, and a 12–6 conference record. Their conference performance was the best in school history and resulted in being tied for 4th in the conference standings and receiving the #6 seed in the Big East Tournament.

After a 20-year drought, USF was selected to the 2012 NCAA Tournament for the first time since 1992. USF defeated California in the "First Four" in Dayton, Ohio, giving the school its first win in the NCAA Tournament. USF advanced to the main bracket as a #12 seed and played in Nashville, Tennessee. In the 2nd round, USF upset 5th seeded Temple, and fell in the 3rd round to 13th seeded Ohio.

USF finished the season with a final record of 22–14. This season set some historical records for the program; a tie for the most wins in a season (22, matching the total in 1982–83), most regular-season conference wins in a season (12 – it was the first time USF had ever had double-digit conference wins), and the first NCAA tournament win. In the final ESPN/USA Today Coaches Poll, USF received a single vote, their first vote in the Coaches Poll in team history and only vote until the 2023–24 season.

== Roster ==
| # | Name | Position | Height | Weight | Year | Former school | Hometown |
|---|---|---|---|---|---|---|---|
| 1 | Ron Anderson | Forward | 6–8 | 237 | RS Senior | Kansas State / McCallie School | Upper Marlboro, MD |
| 2 | Victor Rudd | Forward | 6–7 | 221 | RS Sophomore | Arizona State / Findlay Prep | Los Angeles, CA |
| 5 | Jawanza Poland | Guard | 6–4 | 200 | Junior | Hutchinson CC / Wichita East | Wichita, KS |
| 10 | Mike McCloskey | Guard | 5–11 | 170 | Junior | Lake Brantley HS | Orlando, FL |
| 11 | Anthony Collins | Guard | 6–1 | 180 | Freshman | Westbury Christian School | Houston, TX |
| 15 | Blake Nash | Guard | 6–0 | 190 | Sophomore | Williston State / Fairfax HS | Casa Grande, AZ |
| 22 | Shaun Noriega | Guard | 6–4 | 197 | Junior | North Port HS | North Port, FL |
| 24 | Augustus Gilchrist | Forward | 6–10 | 235 | Senior | Maryland / Progressive Christian Academy | Clinton, MD |
| 25 | Alberto Damour | Forward | 6–5 | 216 | Senior | Poinciana HS | Poinciana, FL |
| 32 | Toarlyn Fitzpatrick | Forward | 6–8 | 243 | Junior | King HS | Tampa, FL |
| 34 | Hugh Robertson | Guard | 6–6 | 200 | Senior | Tallahassee CC / Northeast HS | Macon, GA |
| * | Martino Brock | Guard | 6–5 | 190 | Junior | South Alabama / Maine Central Institute | Memphis, TN |
| ** | Jordan Omogbehin | Center | 7–3 | 291 | Freshman | Atlantic Shores Christian Academy | Lagos, Nigeria |

* Will sit out season due to NCAA transfer rules.

** Will sit out season due to NCAA eligibility rules.

== Schedule and results ==
| Date time, TV | Rank^{#} | Opponent^{#} | Result | Record | Site city, state |
Exhibition
| November 5, 2011*; 7:30pm | | at Tampa (DII) | W 75–43 | | Bob Martinez Sports Center; Tampa, FL |
Regular Season
| November 12, 2011*; 7:00pm | | Vermont; Naismith Memorial Basketball Hall of Fame Tipoff | W 61–59 | 1–0 | Bob Martinez Sports Center; Tampa, FL |
| November 14*; 7:00pm, BHSN/ESPN3 | | Marist; Naismith Memorial Basketball Hall of Fame Tipoff | W 81–67 | 2–0 | St. Pete Times Forum; Tampa, FL |
| November 16*; 7:00pm | | at Florida Southern (DII) | W 73–43 | 3–0 | Lakeland Center; Lakeland, FL |
| November 19*; 2:00pm, ESPN3 | | vs. Old Dominion; Naismith Memorial Basketball Hall of Fame Tipoff | L 66–68 ^{OT} | 3–1 | Mohegan Sun Arena; Uncasville, CT |
| November 20*; 2:00pm, ESPN3 | | vs. Penn State; Naismith Memorial Basketball Hall of Fame Tipoff | L 49–53 | 3–2 | Mohegan Sun Arena; Uncasville, CT |
| November 23*; 7:00pm, BHSN/ESPN3 | | Georgia Southern | W 66–46 | 4–2 | St. Pete Times Forum; Tampa, FL |
| November 26*; 7:00pm | | Florida Atlantic | W 68–55 | 5–2 | Bob Martinez Sports Center; Tampa, FL |
| November 30*; 7:30pm | | at VCU | L 46–69 | 5–3 | Stuart C. Siegel Center; Richmond, VA |
| December 3*; 5:15pm, ESPN2 | | at No. 15 Kansas | L 42–70 | 5–4 | Allen Fieldhouse; Lawrence, KS |
| December 11*; 2:00pm, BHSN | | Florida A&M | W 83–59 | 6–4 | Bob Martinez Sports Center; Tampa, FL |
| December 14*; 9:00pm, BHSN | | at Auburn | L 40–52 | 6–5 | Auburn Arena; Auburn, AL |
| December 19*; 7:00pm, BHSN/ESPN3 | | Cleveland State | W 70–55 | 7–5 | St. Pete Times Forum; Tampa, FL |
| December 22*; 8:00pm | | at Southern Miss | L 51–53 | 7–6 | Reed Green Coliseum; Hattiesburg, MS |
| December 28; 9:00pm, BHSN/ESPN3 | | No. 9 Connecticut | L 57–60 | 7–7 (0–1) | St. Pete Times Forum; Tampa, FL |
| January 1, 2012; 12:00pm, BHSN/ESPN3 | | Rutgers | W 67–65 | 8–7 (1–1) | Tampa Bay Times Forum; Tampa, FL |
| January 5; 8:00pm, BHSN/ESPN3 | | at Villanova | W 74–57 | 9–7 (2–1) | The Pavilion; Villanova, PA |
| January 10; 7:00pm, BHSN/ESPN3 | | at Notre Dame | L 49–60 | 9–8 (2–2) | Edmund P. Joyce Center; Notre Dame, IN |
| January 13; 7:00pm, ESPN3 | | No. 24 Seton Hall | W 56–55 | 10–8 (3–2) | Tampa Bay Times Forum; Tampa, FL |
| January 18; 7:00pm, BHSN/ESPN3 | | St. John's | W 64–49 | 11–8 (4–2) | Tampa Bay Times Forum; Tampa, FL |
| January 22; 2:00pm, ESPN3 | | at DePaul | W 75–59 | 12–8 (5–2) | Allstate Arena; Rosemont, IL |
| January 24; 8:00pm, ESPN3 | | at No. 17 Marquette | L 47–67 | 12–9 (5–3) | Bradley Center; Milwaukee, WI |
| January 29; 2:00pm, ESPN3 | | Providence | W 81–78 | 13–9 (6–3) | Tampa Bay Times Forum; Tampa, FL |
| February 4; 11:00am, ESPNU | | at No. 9 Georgetown | L 45–75 | 13–10 (6–4) | Verizon Center; Washington, D.C. |
| February 8; 7:00pm, BHSN/ESPN3 | | Pittsburgh | W 63–51 | 14–10 (7–4) | Tampa Bay Times Forum; Tampa, FL |
| February 11; 4:00pm, ESPN3 | | at Providence | W 55–48 | 15–10 (8–4) | Dunkin' Donuts Center; Providence, RI |
| February 15; 7:00pm, ESPN2/ESPN3 | | Villanova | W 65–51 | 16–10 (9–4) | Tampa Bay Times Forum; Tampa, FL |
| February 19; 7:00pm, ESPN2 | | at Pittsburgh | W 56–47 | 17–10 (10–4) | Petersen Events Center; Pittsburgh, PA |
| February 22; 7:00pm, BHSN/ESPN3 | | at No. 2 Syracuse | L 48–56 | 17–11 (10–5) | Carrier Dome; Syracuse, NY |
| February 26; 12:00pm, BHSN/ESPN3 | | Cincinnati | W 46–45 | 18–11 (11–5) | Tampa Bay Times Forum; Tampa, FL |
| February 29; 7:00pm, BHSN/ESPN3 | | at No. 19 Louisville | W 58–51 | 19–11 (12–5) | KFC Yum! Center; Louisville, KY |
| March 3; 12:00pm, BHSN/ESPN3 | | West Virginia | L 44–50 | 19–12 (12–6) | Tampa Bay Times Forum; Tampa, FL |
2012 Big East men's basketball tournament
| March 7; 9:00pm, ESPN | | vs. Villanova; Second Round | W 56–47 | 20–12 | Madison Square Garden; New York, NY |
| March 8; 9:00pm, ESPN | | vs. No. 23 Notre Dame; Quarterfinals | L 53–57 ^{OT} | 20–13 | Madison Square Garden; New York, NY |
2012 NCAA Division I men's basketball tournament
| March 14*; 9:00pm, truTV | No. (MW-12) | vs. No. (MW-12) California; First Four | W 65–54 | 21–13 | University of Dayton Arena; Dayton, OH |
| March 16*; 9:50pm, TNT | No. (MW-12) | vs. No. (MW-5) Temple; Second Round | W 58–44 | 22–13 | Bridgestone Arena; Nashville, TN |
| March 18*; 7:10pm, TBS | No. (MW-12) | vs. No. (MW-13) Ohio; Third Round | L 56–62 | 22–14 | Bridgestone Arena; Nashville, TN |
*Non-conference game. ^{#}Rankings from AP Poll. (#) Tournament seedings in parentheses. All times are in Eastern Time (#) during NCAA Tournament is seed with Region.

== Rankings ==
Ranking movements Legend: ██ Increase in ranking ██ Decrease in ranking — = Not ranked RV = Received votes
| | Week | | | | | | | | | | | | | | | | | | | |
| Poll | Pre | 1 | 2 | 3 | 4 | 5 | 6 | 7 | 8 | 9 | 10 | 11 | 12 | 13 | 14 | 15 | 16 | 17 | 18 | Final |
|---|---|---|---|---|---|---|---|---|---|---|---|---|---|---|---|---|---|---|---|---|
| AP | — | — | — | — | — | — | — | — | — | — | — | — | — | — | — | — | — | — | — | Not released |
| Coaches | — | — | — | — | — | — | — | — | — | — | — | — | — | — | — | — | — | — | — | RV |
