= 2011–12 Georgetown Hoyas men's basketball team =

American college basketball season

2011–12 Georgetown Hoyas men's basketball

NCAA tournament, Round of 32
- Conference: Big East Conference

Ranking
- Coaches: No. 17
- AP: No. 15
- Record: 24–9 (12–6 Big East)
- Head coach: John Thompson III (8th season)
- Assistant coaches: Kenya Hunter (5th season); Mike Brennan (3rd season); Robert Kirby (2nd season)
- Captains: Jason Clark; Hollis Thompson
- Home arena: Verizon Center

2011–12 Big East men's basketball standings
	Conf.				Overall
Team	W		L	PCT	W		L	PCT
No. 11 Marquette	14	–	4	.778	27	–	8	.771
Notre Dame	13	–	5	.722	22	–	12	.647
Cincinnati	12	–	6	.667	26	–	11	.703
No. 15 Georgetown	12	–	6	.667	24	–	9	.727
South Florida	12	–	6	.667	22	–	14	.611
West Virginia	9	–	9	.500	19	–	14	.576
Connecticut	8	–	10	.444	20	–	14	.588
Seton Hall	8	–	10	.444	21	–	13	.618
Rutgers	6	–	12	.333	14	–	18	.438
St. John's	6	–	12	.333	13	–	19	.406
Pittsburgh	5	–	13	.278	22	–	17	.564
Villanova	5	–	13	.278	13	–	19	.406
Providence	4	–	14	.222	15	–	17	.469
DePaul	3	–	15	.167	12	–	19	.387
*No. 2 Syracuse	0	–	1	.000	0	–	3	.000
**No. 17 Louisville†	0	–	8	.000	0	–	10	.000
† 2012 Big East tournament winner As of March 31, 2012; *Syracuse: 30 reg. season games, 4 postseason games vacated due to sanctions against the program; Disputed record: Syracuse–(34–3)(17–1) **Louisville: 25 reg. season games, 5 postseason games vacated due to sanctions against the program; Disputed record: Louisville–(30-10)(10-8); Rankings from AP Poll

The 2011–12 Georgetown Hoyas men's basketball team represented Georgetown University in the 2011–2012 NCAA Division I basketball season. They were led by John Thompson III and played their home games at the Verizon Center. They were members of the Big East Conference. Prior to the season, the Hoyas made a goodwill trip to China for several matches with local teams. U.S. Vice President Joe Biden attended their first game, a win over the Shanxi Zhongyu Brave Dragons. Their second game, against the Bayi Rockets, ended in a brawl, causing the team to leave the court while Chinese fans threw garbage and debris. Georgetown won their final games against the Liaoning Dinosaurs and the Taiwanese national team without incident.

Before the season began, the team was picked to finish tenth in the Big East Conference standings. However, early road wins against ranked teams like Memphis, Alabama, and Louisville made the team one of the biggest surprises of the 2011–2012 season, elevating their ranking into the top ten in the nation. With a 12–6 conference record, they finished in a three-way tie for fourth place, with tie breakers placing them fifth, over South Florida but behind Cincinnati.

The team was ranked No. 15 in the season's final Associated Press Poll and No. 17 in the postseason Coaches' Poll.

== Season recap ==
During the offseason, a major shakeup had taken place in the Georgetown roster. Three stars, guard Austin Freeman and forwards Julian Vaughn and Chris Wright, had graduated in 2011, and sophomore reserve guard Vee Sanford had transferred to Dayton after the end of the previous season. Joining the team as freshmen was a much-heralded recruiting class consisting of Mikeal Hopkins, Otto Porter, and Greg Whittington at forward, Jabril Trawick at guard, and Tyler Adams at center, and, after sitting out the previous season, forward Aaron Bowen also began play as a redshirt freshman. Returning upperclassmen were seniors Jason Clark at guard and Henry Sims at center, junior Hollis Thompson at forward, and sophomores Moses Ayegba at center, Nate Lubick at forward, and Markel Starks at guard. Also returning was sophomore John Caprio, a walk-on playing for his second year as a reserve guard. The loss of Freeman, Vaughn, and Wright left the Hoyas with a young and inexperienced team with 10 freshmen and sophomores on the roster for the 2011–12 season and they began the year unranked in the national polls. Expectations for the season were lower than they had been for the past few years, and before the season began, the Big East's coaches picked the Hoyas to finish in 10th place in the 16-team conference.

=== Goodwill tour of China ===
For the first time in their history, the Hoyas went on an overseas trip to play a series of exhibition games – something the NCAA permitted once every four years – visiting China for 10 days in August 2011. Georgetown intended the team's 10-day goodwill tour to be an athletic, cultural, and educational exchange to promote Georgetown University internationally, and scheduled two games in Beijing – billed together as a "China-U.S. Basketball Friendship Match" – followed by two in Shanghai, meeting three Chinese teams and one from Taiwan. The Hoyas won the first game, with Vice President Joe Biden looking on.

The second game, against the Bayi Rockets, a military team from the Chinese Basketball Association composed of People's Liberation Army personnel, was a rough one, with 11 fouls called against Bayi and 28 against Georgetown in the first half alone. The rough play continued in the second half and the game took on an uglier character, as at one point Bayi forward Xu Zhonghao approached head coach John Thompson III as he stood near the bench and yelled at him at close range, and play had to be stopped again a few moments later when Bayi player Wang Lei was called for a technical foul and vociferously disputed the call. Finally, with 9:32 left to play in the game and the score tied at 64-64, Bayi center-forward Hu Ke fouled Jason Clark, Clark complained to him about it, and the two began shoving each other. Both benches cleared, and an estimated six separate fights took place on the court. Members of the crowd, one of them armed with a stanchion, came on the court to join the fight, and some people threw chairs at the Georgetown players. The Chinese officiating crew fled, and Chinese security personnel made no effort to intervene and calm the crowd. Fearing for his players' safety, head coach John Thompson III pulled his team off the court as Chinese fans bombarded the Hoyas and their fan section with water bottles. The game never was finished, and no box score for it was posted. An unidentified United States Department of State official and a spokesman for the Embassy of China in Washington, D.C., both called the brawl "unfortunate."

Despite the ugly incident, the Hoyas continued their trip. Before leaving Beijing, the Georgetown team and Bayi players met to exchange apologies and parted company on friendlier terms. Boosted by the infamy of the brawl in Beijing, Georgetown's next game, played in Shanghai, was a hot ticket, and Chinese officials and security personnel kept tight control of the game and the crowd to ensure that nothing untoward happened. Georgetown won both games in Shanghai without any additional controversy, and Hoya coaches and players spent time at a special basketball clinic for Chinese youth, finishing the trip on a positive note.

=== Non-conference schedule ===
A little less than three months after returning from China, Georgetown began the 2011–12 season with two easy wins at the Verizon Center. In the first, over a Savannah State team coached by former Hoya player Horace Broadnax, Henry Sims came off the bench to score a game-high and career-high 19 points and Hollis Thompson added 13, while Otto Porter grabbed a game-high eight rebounds. The second win was in a game played at the Verizon Center as part of the "Opening Round" of the Maui Invitational Tournament, a newly established round of play in which four teams headed for the tournament on Maui played at home against four mid-major teams which would remain in the Mainland United States to compete with one another in a parallel tournament of their own while the Maui-bound teams played the main tournament in Hawaii. Georgetown's opening-round opponent was UNC Greensboro, and in defeating the Spartans Hollis Thompson scored a game-high 19 points, Jason Clark scored 17 off the bench, and Markel Starks also came off the bench for the first double-digit scoring performance of his collegiate career, adding 11 points.

Georgetown then traveled to Lahaina, Hawaii, for the Maui Invitational Tournament proper, facing No. 14 Kansas, the young Georgetown team's first serious challenge, in the first round. Both teams got off to poor offensive starts; the Jayhawks missed eight of their first 12 shots and the Hoyas did not score for the first 3 minutes 52 seconds and hit only four of their first 15 shots. Down 6-0 before their first field goal, the Hoyas came back to take a 12–9 lead with 10:54 left in the half, then fell behind again before tying the game at 19–19 with 8:36 left. After that, Kansas pulled away to a 32–26 lead before the Hoyas again closed the gap, and the Jayhawks went to the locker room at halftime clinging to a 37–35 lead. In the second half, Kansas extended its lead to 44–39 with 17:31 left in the game, but the underdog Hoyas again came back to take a 48–47 lead with 12:28 to play. Sixteen seconds later, Kansas junior forward Thomas Robinson – who finished with a double-double that included a game-high 20 points (12 of them on dunks) and 12 rebounds – scored a two-point jumper that gave the Jayhawks the lead for good. The Hoyas never trailed by more than five points the rest of the way, however, and Kansas did not clinch the win until Kansas junior guard Travis Releford sank two free throws with 16 seconds left to give the Jayhawks a 67–63 lead, then grabbed the rebound when Jason Clark missed on a three-point jumper with eight seconds to play. Kansas prevailed 67–63, with Jason Clark leading the Hoyas with 15 points, Hollis Thompson contributing 14, and Otto Porter adding 12.

Relegated to the tournament's consolation bracket, Georgetown had an easy win over host Chaminade behind 28 points by Jason Clark and 17 by Otto Porter and advanced to meet its second ranked opponent in three days, No. 8 Memphis. In the first half, both teams repeatedly brought the crowd to its feet with deep three-pointers and many acrobatic dunks and layups. Georgetown made 19 of its 36 shots (52.8%) during the half, while Memphis went 16-for-29 (55.2%). Memphis pulled out to a 9–4 lead with 17:23 left in the first half, but the Hoyas responded with a 17–2 run to take a 21–11 lead with 11:34 until halftime. The Tigers closed to 41–40 with 2:34 remaining, then the Hoyas pulled away again for a 47-42 halftime lead. In the second half, both teams continued their run of spectacular shots, including two notable early dunks by Memphis sophomore center Tarik Black and a dunk and a reverse layup by Henry Sims. Other than a 49-44 Georgetown lead with 19:08 left in regulation, neither team ever led by more than three points for the rest of the game, and the second half saw five ties before its final minute. The Tigers led 78–75 with 2:17 left, but a Jason Clark free throw at 1:43, a Greg Whittington tip shot with 18 seconds left, and a missed three-pointer by Memphis freshman guard-forward Adonis Thomas with two seconds remaining left the score tied at 78–78 at the end of regulation. With 52 seconds left in overtime, Jason Clark hit a three-pointer to give the Hoyas an 88–86 lead, and 18 seconds later Markel Starks stretched it to 90–86 with two free throws. Tigers junior center Stan Simpson made two free throws to close the score to 90–88, then Hollis Thompson sank one of two free throws to increase the Georgetown lead to 91-88 but leaving the door open for the Tigers to tie the game with a final shot and force a second overtime. Memphis sophomore guard Antonio Barton put up a three-point shot at the buzzer, but it fell well short, and Georgetown came away with a 91–88 upset victory and a fifth-place finish in the Maui Invitational. During the game, Jason Clark had a game-high 26 points, Henry Sims had 24 points and eight rebounds, and Market Starks and Hollis Thompson each scored 12.

The Hoyas returned home for a convincing come-from-behind win against IUPUI in which Hollis Thompson had a double-double with 21 points and 10 rebounds, and Henry Sims and Markel Starks came off the bench to score 14 and 13 points, respectively. Averaging 82 points a game on the season, they then went on the road again to begin December with their third game in 11 days against a ranked opponent, visiting No. 12 Alabama in an SEC–Big East Challenge game. Both teams mounted stingy defenses, but Georgetown's zone defense especially flummoxed Alabama, which missed its first 11 three-point attempts including all nine it attempted in the first half. Georgetown led 23–16 at halftime, Alabama scoring its fewest first-half points since a 16-point performance at Oklahoma State on December 18, 2010. In the second half, the Hoyas extended their lead to eight points, the largest deficit the Crimson Tide had faced all season. Alabama closed to a two-point deficit six times over the next few minutes and even took a brief one-point lead, but the Hoyas quickly took it back as Henry Sims scored seven consecutive points, followed by a Hollis Thompson three-pointer and a Jason Clark basket to give Georgetown a 54–45 lead with 2:57 left in the game. Alabama responded by scoring nine unanswered points, culminating in two free throws by sophomore guard Trevor Releford with 13 seconds left to give the Crimson Tide a 55–54 advantage, only its second lead of the second half. On the Hoyas′ following possession, Jason Clark dribbled down the court and passed the ball to Hollis Thompson, who sank a long three-pointer he launched from in front of the Georgetown bench, giving the Hoyas a last-second 57–55 upset win which broke a 24-game Crimson Tide home winning streak dating back almost two years. Jason Clark had a game-high 22 points, Henry Sims added 13 points, and Hollis Thompson had 12 points and pulled down eight rebounds, and the Hoya defense held the Crimson Tide to 3-of-16 (18.8%) shooting from three-point range.

Georgetown rounded out its non-conference schedule by sweeping the homestand that followed, beating all four opponents by double-digit margins ranging from 11 to 40 points and giving the Hoyas an eight-game winning streak. During the homestand, which ended with a rare, regular-season, non-conference rematch with by-then unranked Memphis, Hollis Thompson had 20 points against overmatched NJIT, 12 against Howard, 15 against American, and 17 points and nine rebounds against Memphis. Jason Clark scored 10 points against NJIT, 12 against Howard, and 18 against Memphis. Against American, Henry Sims had an outstanding game, scoring 17 points and grabbing six rebounds in addition to playing an important role noted in a postgame interview by John Thompson III in providing on-court leadership to the Georgetown defense; he followed that with 12 points and nine rebounds against Memphis. Markel Starks scored a game-high 18 points against American and 14 against Memphis, while Otto Porter came off the bench to lead the Hoyas with 13 points against Howard, and narrowly missed a double-double when he pulled down 10 rebounds and scored eight points against American. Mikeal Hopkins came into the NJIT game to score in double digits for the first time in his collegiate career, contributing 12 points. The win over American stretched Georgetown's all-time lead in games between the schools to 44–8, and for the fifth straight season, Georgetown opened with a 10–1 record. Before the Howard game, the Hoyas entered the Top 25 in the national polls for the first time and were ranked No. 18 in the Associated Press Poll; they rose to No. 16 before the American game.

Freshman center Tyler Adams played 11 minutes in the NJIT game on December 3. Seeing no further action, he suffered chest pains during practice on December 14 and was taken to the hospital, where he was diagnosed with a heart arrhythmia that had the potential to make strenuous activities like basketball dangerous and even lethal, although it was also possible that he could play through an entire career with no serious health problem. Although Adams's parents encouraged him to accept the risk and keep playing, John Thompson III did not want him to risk his health, but offered to keep him on scholarship with a medical hardship waiver so that he could attend Georgetown without counting against the team's scholarship limit. After a month of entertaining offers from other schools that said they would clear him to play if he transferred and contemplating his future, Adams decided to forego his college playing career to stay at Georgetown, saying that he lacked the athleticism to succeed in a National Basketball Association career and that it was important to take advantage of the opportunity to earn a Georgetown degree. Adams became a fixture on the team's bench through the end of his senior season, functioning as a de facto assistant coach – and John Thompson III would honor him by allowing him one last collegiate appearance as a player in the final Georgetown home game of his senior year in March 2015.

=== Conference schedule ===
Rising to No. 12 in the AP Poll, Georgetown began its Big East season on December 28 by visiting No. 4 Louisville, the Hoyas′ fourth ranked opponent of the year. Off to its best start since the 1974-75 season, Louisville was one of only six undefeated NCAA Division I teams and had a 20-game home winning streak, its longest such streak since 1984. Louisville held a small lead through most of the first half, but the underdog Hoyas stayed close, and at the half Louisville held only a three-point lead, 35–32. Louisville clung to its lead into the second half, and the Hoyas were down 47-45 when Hollis Thompson scored five consecutive points to put them ahead 51–47 with a little less than nine minutes remaining in the game. Officials then called a bench technical foul on Louisville, and Jason Clark sank both free throws to make the score Georgetown 53 Louisville 47. After two Louisville free throws, Markel Starks – who finished with a career-high 20 points – sank two consecutive three-pointers to give the Hoyas a 59–49 lead with 6:06 to play, and a Henry Sims jump hook shot and Starks layup stretched the lead to 63–52 with 4 1/2 minutes to play. The Cardinals, who had rallied from deficits of seven or more nine times dating back to the previous season, mounted a comeback with an 11–0 run that tied the game at 63–63 with 2:01 left to play. Otto Porter followed a Henry Sims miss with a layup to put Georgetown back in the lead, 65–63, and Sims then hit two free throws to make the lead 67–63. Two Porter free throws stretched the lead to 69-63 before Louisville sophomore guard Russ Smith sank a three-pointer to close the gap to 69–66. Porter followed with two clutch free throws, and the Hoyas prevailed 71–68. The upset victory was Georgetown's ninth in a row and snapped Louisville's long home winning streak. Porter finished with his first collegiate double-double (14 points and 14 rebounds), and Hollis Thompson scored 10 points. The Hoyas then came home to defeat Providence on New Year's Eve in a low-scoring contest in which Georgetown shot 30.5 percent from the field, its worst offensive performance since John Thompson III's arrival in 2004, but held Providence to 25.5 percent, the Friars′ worst-ever field-goal percentage in a Big East game. Jason Clark had a game-high 16 points against the Friars, while Henry Sims added 11 points and Otto Porter grabbed 12 rebounds. The win extended Georgetown's winning streak to 10, its longest streak since the Final Four team of 2006-07 won 11 in a row.

The Hoyas had improved to No. 9 in the AP Poll by the time they hosted No. 20 Marquette in their first game at home against a ranked opponent all season. During the first half and well into the second, it looked as though the Golden Eagles would blow out the Hoyas; Marquette led 43–29 at halftime and extended its lead to 56–39 with 13:10 left to play. However, the Hoyas shot 76 percent from the field during the second half and mounted a comeback led by Jason Clark despite putting four freshmen – Mikael Hopkins, Otto Porter, Jabril Trawick, and Greg Whittington – on the court when upperclassmen Henry Sims and Hollis Thompson got into foul trouble. While the Golden Eagles went cold, not scoring a field goal for 7 1/2 minutes, Georgetown cut Marquette's lead to 62–57 with a little over seven minutes remaining, and Hollis Thompson re-entered the game to score five consecutive points and tie the game at 66-66. A Sims layup put the Hoyas ahead 68–66, and the teams traded baskets to even the score at 70-70. Hollis Thompson, whose last-second three-pointer almost five weeks earlier had given Georgetown its win over Alabama, then hit a clutch three-pointer with 24 seconds to play to give Georgetown a 73–70 victory and an 11-game winning streak. Clark finished with a game-high 26 points, Thompson scored 16, and Sims added 13.

With an overall record of 13-1 and 3–0 in the Big East, Georgetown followed the win over Marquette with eight straight games against unranked teams, its longest stretch without a ranked opponent since the 2007–08 season. It started with the Hoyas′ only back-to-back losses all season; the first, at West Virginia, ended Georgetown's winning streak at 11 games, and the second, against Cincinnati, was the Hoyas′ first home loss all season. A frightening incident took place in the Cincinnati game on January 9 when Bearcat freshman guard Ge'Lawn Guyn suffered a concussion in a collision with Greg Whittington, could not lift his legs, and had to be taken to a hospital, but he recovered quickly. Hollis Thompson led the Hoyas with 20 points at West Virginia and scored 14 against Cincinnati, Jason Clark finished with 10 points against the Mountaineers and 14 against the Bearcats, Henry Sims scored 10 points against both teams, and Markel Starks contributed 10 points in the Cincinnati game.

The Hoyas recovered to win five of their next six games. Hollis Thompson had 20 points against St. John's in a game that dropped the Red Storm to 0–7 against ranked teams and 1–4 at Madison Square Garden on the season, and scored 14 at DePaul in Georgetown's 11th straight win against the Blue Demons, giving the Hoyas a 20-6 all-time series lead over DePaul. Against St. John's, Jason Clark had 15 points and eight rebounds and Otto Porter had a double-double with 13 points and 10 rebounds, while at DePaul Clark finished with a career-high 31 points, Henry Sims had 16, and Porter pulled down 15 rebounds. Against Rutgers, in a game that gave the Hoyas a 10-game home winning streak against the Scarlet Knights dating back to 2000, 10 wins in the teams′ last 11 meetings, and an overall home record against Rutgers of 18–2, Sims had a double-double with 12 points and 10 rebounds and Jason Clark added 11 points. In the loss which followed at Pittsburgh, the Hoya defense allowed the Panthers to shoot 52 percent from the field, the best field-goal percentage by a Georgetown opponent so far that season, but the Georgetown defense recovered against Connecticut in the next game, limiting the Huskies to only 30 percent shooting from the floor (their lowest field-goal percentage since a 23.8 percent effort against Syracuse on February 8, 1997) and to only 44 points, their lowest single-game point total since a 42-point performance, also against Syracuse, on February 1, 1999. The Hoyas followed with a second straight stingy defensive effort in the next game, a win over South Florida. Hollis Thompson scored 11 points against Pittsburgh, and – by then the leading three-point shooter in the Big East – just missed a double-double with 18 points and nine rebounds against Connecticut. Henry Sims scored in double digits in all three games, with 10 points at Pittsburgh, 13 against the Huskies, and a near-double-double with 13 points and nine rebounds against South Florida. Otto Porter led the team against the Panthers with 14 points and came off the bench to add 12 against the Bulls. Jason Clark scored 11 points each against Connecticut and South Florida, and Markel Starks and Jabril Trawick each finished with 10 points against the Bulls, the first time Trawick had scored in double digits in his collegiate career. In the AP Poll, Georgetown dropped to No. 11 after the loss at West Virginia, rose to No. 10 after beating St. John's and to No. 9 after defeating Rutgers, and then dropped again to No. 14 after losing at Pittsburgh, but the Hoyas climbed to No. 12 after the win over South Florida.

With an overall record of 18–4, 8–3 in the Big East, the Hoyas traveled to the Carrier Dome on February 8 to play No. 2 Syracuse, the top shooting team in the Big East, unbeaten in 15 home games during the season, and Georgetown's first ranked opponent in five weeks. The game pitted Syracuse's Big East-leading offense (78.1 points per game) against Georgetown's conference-leading defense (giving up only 58.6 points per game and limiting opponents to 27.6 percent in three-point shooting). In a tight first half that saw five ties, neither team had a strong offensive performance; Georgetown shot 39.4 percent from the field during the half, 3-for-13 (23.1%) from three-point range, while the Orange shot just 29 percent overall from the field and 2-for-11 (18.2%) in three-pointers. The underdog Hoyas pulled out to their largest lead of the game, 29–23, with 1:54 left in the half and led 31–27 at halftime, but Syracuse began the second half with an 8–0 run to take a 35–31 lead with just under 18 minutes left in regulation. Otherwise, neither team led by more than three points until the Orange scored five straight points to pull ahead 54–48 with 4:36 left. Georgetown closed to 55–54 with 1:36 to play thanks to two Jason Clark three-pointers, and Greg Whittington hit a free throw with a minute left to tie the game at 55-55, where the score stood at the end of regulation. Otto Porter scored the first four points in overtime, and Georgetown held a 61–59 lead with 2:19 remaining. Syracuse sophomore guard Dion Waiters sank two free throws to tie the game at 61-61, and, with 29 seconds remaining Orange senior forward Kris Joseph, who finished with 29 points, hit a decisive three-pointer to give Syracuse a 64–61 win and a 48–39 advantage in the all-time series with the Hoyas. In a losing cause, the Hoya defense held Syracuse to 34.9 percent shooting from the field and Georgetown outrebounded the Orange 52–35, while Syracuse held Georgetown, second in the Big East in three-point shooting, to 5-for-21 (23.8 percent) from three-point range. Hollis Thompson (10 points and 10 rebounds) and Otto Porter (14 points and 13 rebounds) both had double-doubles, and Jason Clark scored 12 points. The Orange's victory was the 880th career win for Syracuse head coach Jim Boeheim, moving him past North Carolina′s Dean Smith into third place in career wins.

The Hoyas went 3–1 in their next four games, winning rematches with St. John's and at Providence, suffering an upset loss at Seton Hall, and defeating Villanova. The Hoyas had a balanced attack against the Red Storm, with Greg Whittington finishing with a team-high 12 points, Jason Clark, Otto Porter, and Markel Starks each scoring 11, Hollis Thompson adding 10 and Henry Sims nine, and Nate Lubick having an excellent all-around game with seven points, eight rebounds, five assists, and a career-high four blocked shots. The Hoyas, still the second-stingiest defensive team in the Big East (allowing 58.9 points per game), held Providence to 25.9 percent shooting from the field, the fourth time in five games they had held an opponent to making fewer than 35 percent of its shots, and moved into sole possession of third place in the conference standings by defeating the Friars; Hollis Thompson had a double-double against the Friars with 13 points and 10 rebounds, while Jason Clark also scored 13 and Henry Sims added 10. Allowing only 38.4 percent shooting overall and 27.6 in three-pointers by opponents on the season entering the Seton Hall game, Georgetown had its worst defensive performance of the year, allowing the Pirates to shoot 61.0 percent overall and 61.5 percent from three-point range; Greg Whittington's nine points led the Hoyas in the first game of the season in which no Georgetown player scored in double digits. The Hoyas recovered on both defense and offense against Villanova, limiting the Wildcats to 28 percent shooting from the field and outrebounding them 43–25 in a win that moved the Hoyas into sole possession of fourth place in the Big East; four Hoyas scored in double digits against the Wildcats, with Jason Clark and Otto Porter each finishing with 15, Henry Sims with 12, and Hollis Thompson with 10 points. The Hoyas rose to No. 10 in the AP Poll after beating St. John's and to No. 9 after the win at Providence, although the loss at Seton Hall prompted a drop to No. 11 after the Villanova game.

The Hoyas closed out their regular season with two games against ranked opponents. In the first, against No. 20 Notre Dame at the Verizon Center, the teams combined to make eight of their first 12 shots, then combined to make only three of their next 16. The Hoyas had a 7–0 run to take an 18–11 lead, the last two of those points on a layup by Henry Sims that started a stretch in which he scored or assisted on the next 10 Georgetown points, giving the Hoyas a 26–18 lead. Georgetown led 28–18 at halftime and continued to pull away in the second half, including a 9–0 run that gave the Hoyas a 48–29 lead with about 8 1/2 minutes to play, and cruised to a 59–41 victory. The Hoyas held the Fighting Irish to 33 percent shooting overall and 3-for-17 (17.6%) from three-point range, with no Notre Dame player scoring in double digits, and the Fighting Irish scored their fewest points in a game since a 61–41 loss to Washington State on March 22, 2008, in the 2008 NCAA tournament. In their final home game, Henry Sims and Jason Clark scored 13 and 12 points, respectively, and each grabbed six rebounds, while Greg Whittington came off the bench to add 15 points.

No. 11 Georgetown completed the regular season by going on the road for a rematch with Marquette, now ranked No. 8. The Golden Eagles overwhelmed Georgetown's strong defense with their transition game, outscoring the Hoyas 24-8 off of turnovers and making 33 out of 45 foul shots (73.3%). Marquette led 39–29 at halftime, and began the second half with a 9–2 run to take a 48–31 lead with 17:55 left to play. The Hoyas cut the lead to 51–43 with 14:31 left, but the Golden Eagles then extended their lead to 67–53 with 6:33 remaining. Although the Hoyas soon cut the lead to nine, Marquette led by 11 with a little under four minutes left in the game and went on to win 83–69. Hollis Thompson and Otto Porter each scored 19 points, but Jason Clark shot 4-for-14 (28.6%) from the field and finished with 11 points and Henry Sims fouled out with 9:33 remaining in the game after grabbing nine rebounds but scoring only five points. The Hoyas finished the Big East season at 12–6, in a three-way tie for third place, and with an overall record of 22–7.

=== Big East tournament ===
Although the loss to Marquette in the regular-season finale denied Georgetown a double bye in the 2012 Big East tournament, the Hoyas were seeded fifth and earned a bye in the first round. In the second round – now ranked No. 13 in the AP Poll after the Marquette loss – they faced the 13th seed, Pittsburgh, which had upset 12th-seeded St. John's the previous day to advance to meet Georgetown. Georgetown entered the game as the second-best defensive team in the Big East, allowing opponents only 59 points a game on the season, and held the Panthers scoreless during two separate eight-minute stretches of the game. The Hoyas closed the first half with a decisive 16–2 run that gave them a 31–23 lead at halftime, and, beginning with six straight points by Otto Porter, had a 9–1 run in the second half that extended their lead to 53–39 with 8:46 to play. The Hoyas′ last score of the game came with 2:55 left on two Henry Sims free throws that extended Georgetown's advantage to 64–45. The Panthers then finished the game with a 7–0 run that fell well short of challenging the Hoyas′ lead, and Georgetown won 64–52. Georgetown outrebounded Pittsburgh 36-25 and shot 19-of-39 (48.7%) from the field and 22-of-31 (71.0%) from the free-throw line, while the Panthers went 11-of-18 (61.1%) in free throws. Henry Sims shot 7-for-10 (70.0%) from the field and had a double-double (20 points and 13 rebounds) as well as five assists, and Otto Porter also scored 20 on 7-for-11 (63.6%) shooting, while Greg Whittington added 11 points. It was the 17th time during the season that the Hoyas held an opponent to under 60 points.

Advancing to the quarterfinals, Georgetown faced the No. 4 seed, Cincinnati, the following day. A dramatic narrative of the game was the duel underneath the baskets between the teams′ two senior "big men," Henry Sims and Cincinnati forward Yancy Gates. The first half was close, although Georgetown pulled away in the final five minutes to lead 30–24 at halftime. In the second half, an 8-0 Georgetown run extended the Hoyas′ lead to 49–38, but the Bearcats responded with an 11–3 run that cut Georgetown's lead to 52–49 with 3:53 remaining in regulation. Gates scored over Sims on a layup with 1:56 remaining to narrow the gap to 52–51, then tipped in a miss by Cincinnati junior guard Cashmere Wright to give the Bearcats their first lead of the second half at 53–52 with 37 seconds left. After Cincinnati senior guard Dion Dixon sank the first of two free throws to extend his team's lead to 54-52 but missed his second shot, Otto Porter grabbed the rebound and scored on a jumper with four seconds remaining to tie the game at 54-54 and force overtime. In overtime, Cincinnati staked itself to a 62–60 lead on a Dixon free throw with 20 seconds left, but Henry Sims, finding himself at the top of the key with the ball and with time running out, drove in toward the basket and made a layup at the buzzer to force a second overtime with the score tied 62-62. The teams traded baskets in the second overtime, and Sims tied it with a two-point jumper at 70–70 with 29 seconds to play, but Wright countered with a jumper 20 seconds later to give the Bearcats a 72–70 advantage. On the next possession, Sims missed a three-point attempt from way out of range at the buzzer, and Cincinnati won 72-70 despite shooting 2-for-21 (9.5%) in three-pointers. Sims led the Hoyas with a double-double (22 points and 15 rebounds), while Otto Porter added 14 points and grabbed seven rebounds, Jason Clark scored 12 points, and Hollis Thompson finished with 10. It was the first multiple-overtime game for the Hoyas since January 24, 2006, and the first one in the Big East tournament since Syracuse beat Connecticut in six overtimes in the 2009 quarterfinals. The Bearcats advanced to upset Syracuse in the semifinals and then to the championship game, where they lost to Louisville.

=== NCAA tournament ===
Dropping to No. 15 in the AP Poll but with a record of 23–8, Georgetown earned a bid in the 2012 NCAA tournament, the Hoyas′ third consecutive appearance in the tournament and sixth in seven seasons. Seeded third in the Midwest Region, in the Round of 64 – termed the "Second Round" of the tournament that year – they met 14th-seeded Belmont, the regular-season champion of the Atlantic Sun Conference and winner of the 2012 Atlantic Sun tournament, with Country Music Hall of Fame member Vince Gill looking on from the front row of the Belmont cheering section. The Bruins entered the game with a 14-game winning streak, but Georgetown dominated them with its defense and inside game. The Hoyas led 36–27 at halftime and never let the Bruins get closer than six points for the rest of the game. After Belmont closed to 58–49 with just under six minutes left in the game, the Hoyas went on a 13–2 run to ensure a 74–59 victory. Belmont made just 10 of their 27 three-point attempts (37.0%), while Georgetown shot 61 percent from the floor for the game and 70 percent in the second half. Jason Clark led the Hoyas with 21 points, Otto Porter scored 16 points and pulled down eight rebounds, and Henry Sims finished with 15 points. Belmont's winning streak came to an end, and the Bruins fell to 0-5 all time in NCAA tournament play. It was the first time the Hoyas had won an NCAA tournament game since the first game of the 2008 tournament, and only the second Georgetown NCAA tournament victory since the Final Four season of 2006–07, despite four appearances in the tournament over that span.

Two days later, Georgetown met the Midwest Region's 11th seed, North Carolina State, in the Round of 32, termed the "Third Round" that year. The Wolfpack had upset the region's sixth seed, San Diego State, to advance to meet the Hoyas. North Carolina State mounted a strong defensive effort and, down by eight points in the first half, had a 12–0 run that put them ahead 30–27 at the half. In the second half, the Wolfpack extended their lead to 11 points and got Henry Sims into foul trouble before the Hoyas mounted a strong comeback, closing to 63-61 before Otto Porter missed a potential game-tying two-point jumper with 14 seconds left. North Carolina State guard Lorenzo Brown then hit two free throws to extend the Wolfpack's lead to 65–61 with 10.6 seconds to play. With 4.6 seconds left, Brown hit one of two free throws but missed the second, leaving the door open for Georgetown to tie the game with a last-second three-pointer. Jason Clark got the ball and launched the last shot of his collegiate career, a hurried three-point attempt, but it missed, and North Carolina State ended Georgetown's season with a 66–63 upset victory. Hollis Thompson finished with 23 points, Clark had 10, and Otto Porter scored nine points and grabbed eight rebounds. For the fourth straight time, the Hoyas exited the NCAA tournament in its first weekend due to an upset by a lower-seeded opponent. The Wolfpack, meanwhile, advanced to the region semifinal, which they lost to Kansas.

=== Wrap-up ===
Jason Clark, who started all 33 games during the season, finished the year with a team-leading 14 points per game on 47.6 percent shooting from the field and 75 percent from the free-throw line, and he was fourth in rebounds with 4.1 per game. Also starting every game, Hollis Thompson finished second on the team with an average of 12.8 points per game on 46.4 shooting from the field overall, and he led the Big East in three-point shooting at 43.0 percent and was third on the team in rebounds with 5.5 per game; he was an honorable-mention all-conference pick. Henry Sims, who also started all 33 games, had a break-out year, averaging 11.6 points per game with a field-goal percentage of 46.2 and a free-throw percentage of 70.8, and he was second on the team with 6.0 rebounds per game. Otto Porter only started eight games but played in all 33 and led the team in field-goal percentage (52.5%) and rebounds (6.8) while averaging 9.7 points per game. Markel Starks, starting 25 of the 31 games he played in, averaged 7.1 points per game on 45.5 percent shooting. Nate Lubick started all 33 games and averaged 3.5 points per game, while Greg Whittington appeared in all 33 and averaged 4.3 points. Mikeal Hopkins played in 30 games, averaging 2.4 points.

After the season, Jason Clark and Henry Sims graduated. Clark had played in all 130 games of his collegiate career, starting every game in his sophomore, junior, and senior years; he averaged 10.5 points per game on 48.0 percent field-goal shooting over his four-year career. He went on to play professional basketball in Europe. Sims played as a reserve in his first three seasons, skewing his overall career statistics, but he started every game in his senior year, and it was far and away his best season. Over his 121-game college career, he averaged 4.9 points per game on 47.9 percent shooting from the field, and he pulled down an average of 3.2 rebounds per game. He went undrafted in the 2012 NBA draft, but later signed with several National Basketball Association teams, beginning with the New York Knicks. Hollis Thompson announced on March 27, 2012, that he would not return to Georgetown for his senior year the following season and would enter the 2012 NBA draft; he left Georgetown having played 99 games, 57 as a starter, with a career average of 8.7 points, 4.1 rebounds, 1.1 assists, and 24.6 minutes per game, shooting 47.8 percent overall from the field, and his three-point shooting percentage of 44 percent was the best in school history. He went undrafted in the NBA draft, but signed with the Oklahoma City Thunder in July 2012 and with the Philadelphia 76ers in September 2013. He was the twelfth Hoya player in seven seasons to leave the team prior to the end of his college eligibility.

Consistently fielding one of the top defenses in the Big East, the 2011–12 Hoyas were a team that finished much higher in the conference than projected and won Georgetown’s first NCAA tournament game in four years, despite a relatively young roster that included 10 freshmen and sophomores. However, they also continued Georgetown’s pattern of early NCAA tournament exits against less established teams. They finished with a 24–9 record, and their final ranking was No. 15 in the AP Poll and No. 17 in the Coaches Poll.

== Roster ==
2011–12 Georgetown Hoyas men's basketball team
Players
Coaches

Pos.	#	Name	Height	Weight	Year	Previous school	Hometown
C	0	Tyler Adams (injured)	6 ft 9 in (2.06 m)	275 lb (125 kg)	Fr	Brandon HS	Brandon, Mississippi
F	1	Hollis Thompson	6 ft 8 in (2.03 m)	212 lb (96 kg)	Jr	Loyola HS	Concord, California
F	2	Greg Whittington	6 ft 8 in (2.03 m)	212 lb (96 kg)	Fr	Oakland Mills HS	Columbia, Maryland
F	3	Mikael Hopkins	6 ft 9 in (2.06 m)	223 lb (101 kg)	Fr	DeMatha Catholic HS	Hyattsville, Maryland
G	5	Markel Starks	6 ft 2 in (1.88 m)	175 lb (79 kg)	So	Georgetown Prep	Accokeek, Maryland
C	14	Henry Sims	6 ft 10 in (2.08 m)	245 lb (111 kg)	Sr	Mount Saint Joseph College	Baltimore, Maryland
G	21	Jason Clark	6 ft 2 in (1.88 m)	180 lb (82 kg)	Sr	Bishop O'Connell HS	Arlington, Virginia
F	22	Otto Porter	6 ft 8 in (2.03 m)	205 lb (93 kg)	Fr	Scott County Central HS	Sikeston, Missouri
F	23	Aaron Bowen	6 ft 6 in (1.98 m)	205 lb (93 kg)	RS Fr	Wolfson HS	Jacksonville, Florida
G	25	John Caprio	6 ft 6 in (1.98 m)	220 lb (100 kg)	So	Seton Hall Prep	North Caldwell, New Jersey
C	32	Moses Ayegba	6 ft 9 in (2.06 m)	250 lb (113 kg)	So	Progressive Christian Academy	Kano, Nigeria
F	34	Nate Lubick	6 ft 8 in (2.03 m)	235 lb (107 kg)	So	St. Mark's School	Southborough, Massachusetts
G	55	Jabril Trawick	6 ft 5 in (1.96 m)	208 lb (94 kg)	Fr	Abington Friends School	Jenkintown, Pennsylvania

Head coach

John Thompson III

Assistant coach(es)

Kenya Hunter
Mike Brennan
Robert Kirby

Legend

- (C) Team captain
- (S) Suspended
- (I) Ineligible
- (W) Walk-on
- Injured
- Current redshirt

Roster
Last update: December 11, 2011

== Rankings ==
Ranking movement Legend: ██ Improvement in ranking. ██ Decrease in ranking. ██ Not ranked the previous week. RV=Others receiving votes.
Poll	Pre Nov 7	Wk 2 Nov 14	Wk 3 Nov 21	Wk 4 Nov 28	Wk 5 Dec 5	Wk 6 Dec 12	Wk 7 Dec 19	Wk 8 Dec 26	Wk 9 Jan 2	Wk 10 Jan 9	Wk 11 Jan 16	Wk 12 Jan 23	Wk 13 Jan 30	Wk 14 Feb 6	Wk 15 Feb 13	Wk 16 Feb 20	Wk 17 Feb 27	Wk 18 Mar 5	Post Mar 12	Final Apr 2
AP			RV	RV	18	16	16	12	9	9	10	9	14	12	10	9	11	13	15	(Note: No Associated Press Poll this week.)
Coaches		RV		RV	21	17	16	12	9	9	12	10	14	11	9	8	12	14	15	17

== Schedule and results ==
Date time, TV	Rank^{#}	Opponent^{#}	Result	Record	High points	High rebounds	High assists	Site (attendance) city, state
Goodwill tour of China (Exhibition)
August 17*; 7:15 am		vs. Shanxi Zhongyu Brave Dragons	W 98−81	exhibition	16 – Porter	8 – Sims	4 – Clark, Lubick, Sims	Olympic Sports Center (N/A); Beijing, China
August 18*; 5:30 am		vs. Bayi Rockets	T 64−64 (Note: The game was suspended with the score tied 64−64 after a brawl broke out between the teams with 9 minutes 32 seconds left to play. John Thompson III pulled Georgetown's players off the court out of concern for their safety. Play never resumed. No box score was posted.)	exhibition	N/A –	N/A –	N/A –	Olympic Sports Center (N/A); Beijing, China
August 21*; 4:00 am		vs. Liaoning Dinosaurs	W 91−69	exhibition	17 – Clark	7 – Porter	6 – Lubick	Shanghai Stadium (N/A); Shanghai, China
August 23*; 7:00 am		vs. Chinese Taipei National Team	W 83−64	exhibition	16 – Thompson	10 – Thompson	4 – Bowen, Lubick	Jing'An Gymnasium (N/A); Shanghai, China
Regular season
November 12*; 12:00 pm		Savannah State	W 83–54	1–0	19 – Sims	8 – Porter	5 – Lubick	Verizon Center (9,876); Washington, D.C.
November 14*; 7:00 pm, MASN		UNC Greensboro; Maui Invitational • Opening Round	W 86–45	2–0	19 – Thompson	7 – Sims	4 – Porter	Verizon Center (7,987); Washington, D.C.
November 21*; 11:50 pm, ESPN2		vs. No. 14 Kansas; Maui Invitational • First Round	L 63–67	2–1	15 – Clark	6 – Sims	2 – Lubick	Lahaina Civic Center (2,400); Maui, HI
November 22*; 4:30 pm, ESPN2		vs. Chaminade; Maui Invitational • Second Round	W 88–61	3–1	28 – Clark	7 – Porter	7 – Sims	Lahaina Civic Center (2,400); Maui, HI
November 23*; 5:00 pm, ESPN2		vs. No. 8 Memphis; Maui Invitational • Fifth Place Game	W 91–88 ^{OT}	4–1	26 – Clark	8 – Sims	5 – Sims	Lahaina Civic Center (2,400); Maui, HI
November 28*; 7:00 pm, MASN		IUPUI	W 81–58	5–1	21 – Thompson	14 – Lubick	5 – Lubick	Verizon Center (6,854); Washington, D.C.
December 1*; 9:30 pm, ESPN2		at No. 12 Alabama; SEC–Big East Challenge	W 57–55	6–1	22 – Clark	8 – Thompson	3 – Thompson	Coleman Coliseum (15,383); Tuscaloosa, AL
December 3*; 1:00 pm, ESPN3		NJIT	W 84–44	7–1	20 – Thompson	6 – Adams	4 – Sims	Verizon Center (8,742); Washington, D.C.
December 10*; 12:00 pm, MASN	No. 18	Howard	W 62–48	8–1	13 – Porter	8 – Lubick	3 – Lubick	Verizon Center (8,120); Washington, D.C.
December 17*; 12:00 pm, MASN	No. 16	American	W 81–55	9–1	18 – Starks	10 – Porter	6 – Sims	Verizon Center (9,964); Washington, D.C.
December 22*; 12:00 pm, ESPN2	No. 16	Memphis	W 70–59	10–1	26 – Clark	9 – Thompson	5 – Sims	Verizon Center (12,045); Washington, D.C.
December 28; 7:00 pm, ESPN2	No. 12	at No. 4 Louisville	W 71–68	11–1 (1–0)	20 – Starks	14 – Porter	4 – Sims	KFC Yum! Center (22,517); Louisville, KY
December 31; 2:00 pm, ESPN2	No. 12	Providence	W 49–40	12–1 (2–0)	16 – Clark	12 – Porter	3 – Sims	Verizon Center (11,834); Washington, D.C.
January 4, 2012; 7:00 pm, ESPNU	No. 9	No. 20 Marquette	W 73–70	13–1 (3–0)	26 – Clark	5 – Clark	5 – Sims	Verizon Center (11,213); Washington, D.C.
January 7; 12:00 pm, MASN	No. 9	at West Virginia	L 62–74	13–2 (3–1)	20 – Thompson	6 – Porter	6 – Sims	WVU Coliseum (10,526); Morgantown, WV
January 9; 9:00 pm, ESPNU	No. 11	Cincinnati	L 64–68	13–3 (3–2)	14 – Clark	8 – Lubick	3 – Lubick	Verizon Center (7,887); Washington, D.C.
January 15; 12:00 pm, MASN	No. 11	at St. John's	W 69–49	14–3 (4–2)	20 – Thompson	10 – Porter	8 – Clark	Madison Square Garden (11,475); New York City, NY
January 17; 7:00 pm, ESPN2	No. 10	at DePaul	W 83–75	15–3 (5–2)	31 – Clark	15 – Porter	6 – Lubick	Allstate Arena (8,322); Chicago, IL
January 21; 12:00 pm, MASN	No. 10	Rutgers	W 52–50	16–3 (6–2)	12 – Sims	10 – Sims	2 – Sims	Verizon Center (12,852); Washington, D.C.
January 28; 4:00 pm, ESPN	No. 9	at Pittsburgh	L 60–72	16–4 (6–3)	14 – Porter	6 – Porter	5 – Sims	Petersen Events Center (12,508); Pittsburgh, PA
February 1; 7:00 pm, ESPN2	No. 14	Connecticut; Rivalry	W 58–44	17–4 (7–3)	18 – Thompson	9 – Thompson	2 – Thompson	Verizon Center (15,174); Washington, D.C.
February 4; 11:00 am, ESPNU	No. 14	South Florida	W 75–45	18–4 (8–3)	13 – Sims	9 – Sims	5 – Sims	Verizon Center (11,916); Washington, D.C.
February 8; 7:00 pm, ESPN	No. 12	at No. 2 Syracuse; Rivalry	L 61–64 ^{OT}	18–5 (8–4)	14 – Porter	13 – Porter	4 – Whittington	Carrier Dome (27,820); Syracuse, NY
February 12; 1:00 pm, ESPN	No. 12	St. John's	W 71–61	19–5 (9–4)	12 – Whittington	8 – Porter	5 – Lubick	Verizon Center (12,285); Washington, D.C.
February 18; 7:00 pm, MASN	No. 10	at Providence	W 63–53	20–5 (10–4)	13 – Thompson	10 – Thompson	5 – Sims	Dunkin Donuts Center (11,563); Providence, RI
February 21; 7:00 pm, MASN	No. 9	at Seton Hall	L 55–73	20–6 (10–5)	9 – Whittington	6 – Thompson	2 – Thompson	Prudential Center (8,111); Newark, NJ
February 25; 2:00 pm, CBS	No. 9	Villanova	W 67–46	21–6 (11–5)	15 – Clark	6 – Clark	4 – Thompson	Verizon Center (19,277); Washington, D.C.
February 27; 7:00 pm, ESPN	No. 11	No. 20 Notre Dame	W 59–41	22–6 (12–5)	15 – Whittington	10 – Porter	5 – Sims	Verizon Center (14,514); Washington, D.C.
March 3; 2:00 pm, MASN	No. 11	at No. 8 Marquette	L 69–83	22–7 (12–6)	19 – Thompson	9 – Sims	4 – Thompson	Bradley Center (19,087); Milwaukee, WI
Big East tournament
March 7; 2:00pm, ESPN	No. 13	vs. Pittsburgh; Second Round	W 64–52	23–7	20 – Sims	13 – Sims	5 – Sims	Madison Square Garden (20,057); New York, NY
March 8; 2:00pm, ESPN	No. 13	vs. Cincinnati; Quarterfinal	L 70–72 ^{2OT}	23–8	22 – Sims	15 – Sims	4 – Porter	Madison Square Garden (20,057); New York, NY
NCAA tournament
March 16*; 3:10pm, truTV	No. 15	vs. Belmont; Second Round	W 74–59	24–8	21 – Clark	8 – Porter	5 – Sims	Nationwide Arena (17,030); Columbus, OH
March 18*; 12:15pm, CBS	No. 15	vs. North Carolina State; Third Round	L 63–66	24–9	23 – Thompson	8 – Porter	3 – Thompson	Nationwide Arena (17,425); Columbus, Ohio
*Non-conference game. ^{#}Rankings from AP Poll. (#) Tournament seedings in parentheses. All times are in Eastern Time Zone.

== Awards and honors ==
=== Big East Conference honors ===
Postseason honors
Honors	Player	Position	Date awarded	Ref.
All-Big East First Team	Jason Clark	G	March 4, 2012	
All-Big East Third Team	Henry Sims	C	March 4, 2012	
All-Big East Honorable Mention	Hollis Thompson	F	March 4, 2012	
