= 2011–12 Marquette Golden Eagles men's basketball team =

American college basketball season

2011–12 Marquette Golden Eagles men's basketball
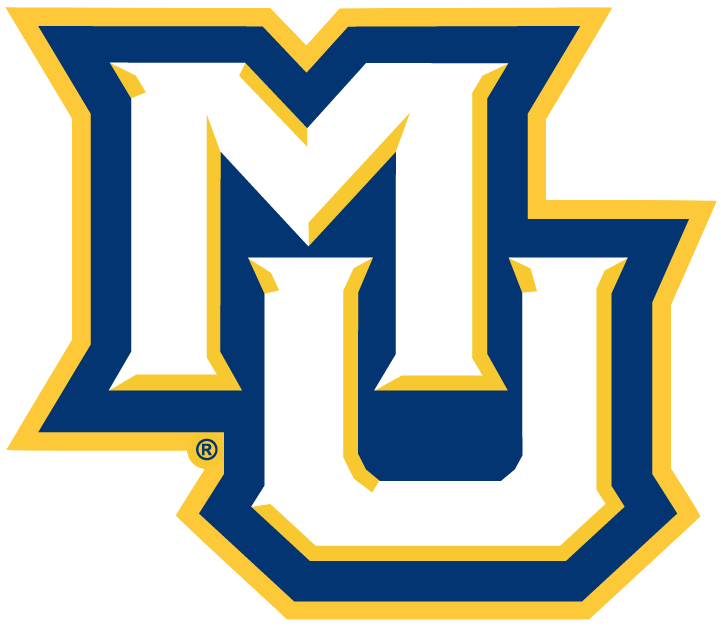

Paradise Jam Champions

NCAA Tournament, Sweet Sixteen
- Conference: Big East Conference (1979–2013)

Ranking
- Coaches: No. 10
- AP: No. 11
- Record: 27–8 (14–4 Big East)
- Head coach: Buzz Williams (4th season)
- Assistant coaches: Tony Benford; Aki Collins; Scott Monarch
- Home arena: Bradley Center

2011–12 Big East men's basketball standings
	Conf.				Overall
Team	W		L	PCT	W		L	PCT
No. 11 Marquette	14	–	4	.778	27	–	8	.771
Notre Dame	13	–	5	.722	22	–	12	.647
Cincinnati	12	–	6	.667	26	–	11	.703
No. 15 Georgetown	12	–	6	.667	24	–	9	.727
South Florida	12	–	6	.667	22	–	14	.611
West Virginia	9	–	9	.500	19	–	14	.576
Connecticut	8	–	10	.444	20	–	14	.588
Seton Hall	8	–	10	.444	21	–	13	.618
Rutgers	6	–	12	.333	14	–	18	.438
St. John's	6	–	12	.333	13	–	19	.406
Pittsburgh	5	–	13	.278	22	–	17	.564
Villanova	5	–	13	.278	13	–	19	.406
Providence	4	–	14	.222	15	–	17	.469
DePaul	3	–	15	.167	12	–	19	.387
*No. 2 Syracuse	0	–	1	.000	0	–	3	.000
**No. 17 Louisville†	0	–	8	.000	0	–	10	.000
† 2012 Big East tournament winner As of March 31, 2012; *Syracuse: 30 reg. season games, 4 postseason games vacated due to sanctions against the program; Disputed record: Syracuse–(34–3)(17–1) **Louisville: 25 reg. season games, 5 postseason games vacated due to sanctions against the program; Disputed record: Louisville–(30-10)(10-8); Rankings from AP Poll

The 2011–12 Marquette Golden Eagles men's basketball team represented Marquette University in the 2011–12 NCAA Division I men's basketball season. Marquette was coached by Buzz Williams and played their home games at the Bradley Center in Milwaukee, Wisconsin. The Golden Eagles were members of the Big East Conference. The Golden Eagles finished the season 26–7, 14–4 in Big East play to finish in second place. (Syracuse, the winner of the Big East regular season, was forced to vacate its wins from the season due to NCAA violations.) The Eagles received an at-large bid to the NCAA tournament where they defeated BYU and Murray State to advance to the Sweet Sixteen for the second consecutive year. There they lost to Florida.

== Previous season ==
The Golden Eagles finished the 2010–11 season 22–15, 9–9 in Big East play to finish in a three-way tie for ninth place. They received an at-large bid to the NCAA tournament where they advanced to the Sweet Sixteen before losing to North Carolina.

== Preseason ==
On October 19, 2011, at Big East Media Day, Marquette was picked to finish in sixth place in the Big East Preseason Coaches' Poll, receiving 155 points. Darius Johnson-Odom was named to the Preseason All-Big East First Team, while Jae Crowder was an honorable mention.

== Roster ==
#	Name	Height	Weight (lbs.)	Position	Class	Hometown	Previous Team(s)
0	Jamil Wilson	6'7"	210	F	So.	Racine, WI, U.S.	Horlick HS/Oregon
1	Darius Johnson-Odom	6'2"	200	G	Sr.	Raleigh, NC, U.S.	Wakefield HS/Hutchinson CC
2	Vander Blue	6'4"	190	G	So.	Madison, WI, U.S.	Madison Memorial HS
4	Todd Mayo	6'3"	190	G	Fr.	Huntington, WV, U.S.	Notre Dame Prep
5	Junior Cadougan	6'1"	205	G	Jr.	Toronto, ON, Canada	Christian Life Center Academy
10	Juan Anderson	6'6"	205	F	Fr.	Oakland, CA, U.S.	Castro Valley HS
22	Jamail Jones	6'6"	210	F	So.	Atlanta, GA, U.S.	Montverde Academy
23	Jake Thomas	6'3"	190	G	Sr.	Racine, WI, U.S.	St. Catherine's HS/South Dakota
32	Jae Crowder	6'6"	225	F	Sr.	Villa Rica, GA, U.S.	Villa Rica HS/Howard College
33	Derrick Wilson	6'1"	215	G	Fr.	Anchorage, AK, U.S.	The Hotchkiss School
42	Chris Otule	6'10"	250	C	Jr.	Richmond, TX, U.S.	Fort Bend HS
54	Davante Gardner	6'8"	290	F	So.	Suffolk, VA, U.S.	Kings Fork HS

== 2011 Paradise Jam ==
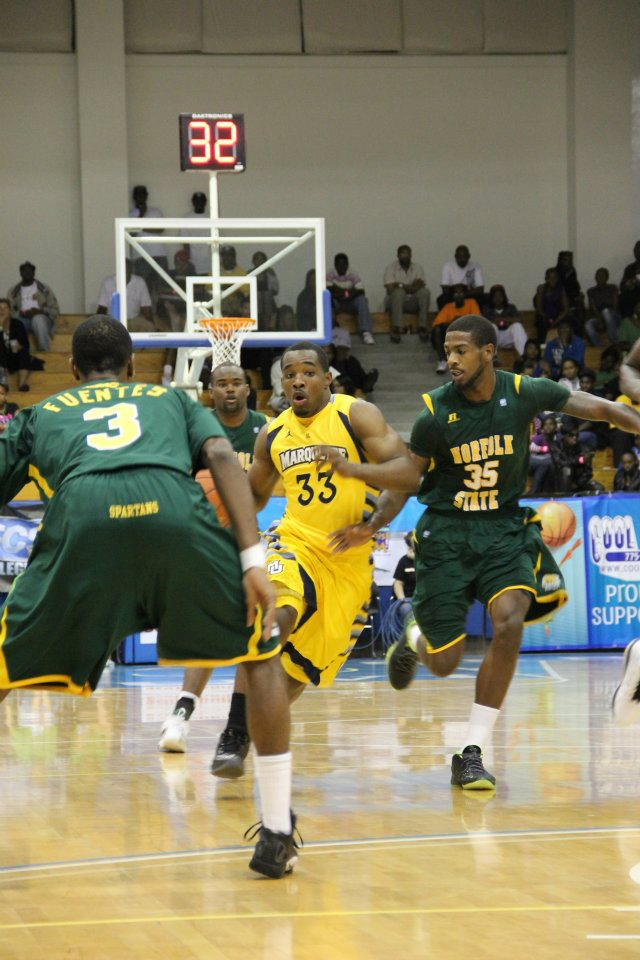
Marquette's Derrick Wilson drives against Norfolk State's Jamel Fuentes while Chris McEachin trails at the 2011 Paradise Jam Tournament

Marquette traveled to St. Thomas for the Paradise Jam tournament in mid-November. Marquette had an easy path to the final game, then were tested. In the opening round, Marquette took on Winthrop, and won easily 95–73, behind 26 points from Vander Blue, who hit his first nine shots, which included two three-point attempts. In the semifinal round, Marquette again won easily, beating Ole Miss 96–66. In this game, Jae Crowder hit nine of eleven field goal attempts, and ended with 25 points. Norfolk State also won their first two game in the tournament, so the two teams faced each other for the tournament championship. Marquette had played Norfolk State just a week earlier in Milwaukee, in a game that was never in doubt. Marquette opened up a 6–0 lead, expanded the lead to eleven by halftime, then scored 59 points in the second half to win the game 99–68.

When the two teams met in the Paradise Jam final, the game started out similarly to the early game, with Marquette never trailing, and reaching a nine point lead at halftime. However, instead of scoring 59 points in the second half, they would score only 59 points in the game. The Golden Eagles, ranked 16th in the AP poll, held a 14 point lead at one time, but Norfolk State had two 7–0 runs and tied up the game at 57 points apiece with just over two minutes left. Marquette scored to take a lead; Norfolk State had a chance to tie in the closing seconds but failed to hit the basket, and Marquette won the 2011 Paradise Jam Championship 59–57.

== Schedule and results ==
Date time, TV	Rank^{#}	Opponent^{#}	Result	Record	Site (attendance) city, state
Non-conference regular season
11/11/2011*; 8:00 pm, Sports32/MASN/SNY	No. 22	Mount St. Mary's	W 91–37	1–0	Bradley Center (13,834); Milwaukee, WI
11/14/2011*; 7:00 pm, Sports32	No. 21	Norfolk State	W 99–68	2–0	Bradley Center (12,765); Milwaukee, WI
11/18/2011*; 7:30 pm	No. 21	vs. Winthrop; Paradise Jam First Round	W 95–73	3–0	Sports and Fitness Center (2,845); Saint Thomas, USVI
11/20/2011*; 7:30 pm, FSN	No. 21	vs. Ole Miss; Paradise Jam Semifinals	W 96–66	4–0	Sports and Fitness Center (2,881); Saint Thomas, USVI
11/21/2011*; 8:30 pm, FSN	No. 16	vs. Norfolk State; Paradise Jam Finals	W 59–57	5–0	Sports and Fitness Center (3,109); Saint Thomas, USVI
11/28/2011*; 7:00 pm, Sports32/SNY	No. 16	Jacksonville	W 88–56	6–0	Bradley Center (12,848); Milwaukee, WI
12/03/2011*; 3:30 pm, BTN	No. 16	at No. 9 Wisconsin	W 61–54	7–0	Kohl Center (17,230); Madison, WI
12/06/2011*; 8:00 pm, ESPN	No. 11	vs. Washington; Jimmy V Classic	W 79–77	8–0	Madison Square Garden (8,231); New York, NY
12/10/2011; 8:00 pm, Sports32	No. 11	Green Bay	W 79–61	9–0	Bradley Center (14,208); Milwaukee, WI
12/17/2011*; 3:00 pm, Sports32	No. 11	Northern Colorado	W 93–72	10–0	Bradley Center (13,593); Milwaukee, WI
12/19/2011*; 8:00 pm, FS Wisconsin	No. 10	at LSU; SEC–Big East Challenge	L 59–67	10–1	Pete Maravich Assembly Center (8,630); Baton Rouge, LA
12/22/2011*; 8:00 pm, Sports32	No. 10	Milwaukee	W 64–50	11–1	Bradley Center (14,917); Milwaukee, WI
12/29/2011*; 8:00 pm, ESPN2	No. 14	Vanderbilt	L 57–74	11–2	Bradley Center (15,684); Milwaukee, WI
Big East regular season
01/01/2012; 12:00 pm, ESPNU	No. 14	Villanova	W 81–77	12–2 (1–0)	Bradley Center (14,550); Milwaukee, WI
01/04/2012; 6:00 pm, ESPNU	No. 20	at No. 9 Georgetown	L 70–73	12–3 (1–1)	Verizon Center (11,213); Washington, D.C.
01/07/2012; 3:00 pm, Big East Network/Sports32	No. 20	at No. 1 Syracuse	L 66–73	12–4 (1–2)	Carrier Dome (25,412); Syracuse, NY
01/11/2012; 6:00 pm, ESPNU	No. 25	St. John's	W 83–64	13–4 (2–2)	Bradley Center (14,484); Milwaukee, WI
01/14/2012; 1:00 pm, ESPNU	No. 25	Pittsburgh	W 83–64	14–4 (2–2)	Bradley Center (18,404); Milwaukee, WI
01/16/2012; 1:00 pm, ESPN	No. 21	No. 23 Louisville	W 74–63	15–4 (4–2)	Bradley Center (16,688); Milwaukee, WI
01/21/2012; 6:00 pm, Big East Network/Sports32	No. 21	at Providence	W 79–72	16–4 (5–2)	Dunkin' Donuts Center (16,688); Providence, RI
01/24/2012; 7:00 pm, Big East Network/Sports32	No. 17	South Florida	W 67–47	17–4 (6–2)	Bradley Center (13,693); Milwaukee, WI
01/28/2012; 11:00 am, ESPN2	No. 17	at Villanova	W 82–78	18–4 (7–2)	Wells Fargo Center (15,878); Philadelphia, PA
01/31/2012; 7:00 pm, Big East Network/Sports32	No. 15	Seton Hall	W 66–59	19–4 (8–2)	Bradley Center (13,828); Milwaukee, WI
02/04/2012; 12:00 pm, CBS	No. 15	at Notre Dame	L 59–76	19–5 (8–3)	Edmund P. Joyce Center (9,149); South Bend, IN
02/06/2012; 8:00 pm, ESPNU	No. 18	at DePaul	W 89–76	20–5 (9–3)	Allstate Arena (9,276); Rosemont, IL
02/11/2012; 2:00 pm, ESPNU	No. 18	Cincinnati	W 95–78	21–5 (10–3)	Bradley Center (18,815); Milwaukee, WI
02/18/2012; 1:00 pm, ESPN	No. 12	at Connecticut	W 79–64	22–5 (11–3)	XL Center (16,294); Hartford, CT
02/22/2012; 7:00 pm, Big East Network/Sports32	No. 10	Rutgers	W 82–65	23–5 (12–3)	Bradley Center (14,807); Milwaukee, WI
02/24/2012; 8:00 pm, ESPN	No. 10	at West Virginia	W 61–60	24–5 (13–3)	WVU Coliseum (12,087); Morgantown, WV
02/29/2012; 6:00 pm, ESPN2	No. 8	at Cincinnati	L 61–72	24–6 (13–4)	Fifth Third Arena (11,316); Cincinnati, OH
03/03/2012; 1:00 pm, Big East Network	No. 8	No. 11 Georgetown	W 83–69	25–6 (14–4)	Bradley Center (19,087); Milwaukee, WI
Big East tournament
03/08/2012; 7:00 pm, ESPN	(2) No. 9	vs. (7) Louisville; Quarterfinals	L 71–84	25–7	Madison Square Garden (20,057); New York City, NY
NCAA tournament
03/15/2012*; 2:40 pm, CBS	(3 W) No. 11	vs. (14 W) BYU; Second Round	W 88–68	26–7	KFC Yum! Center (16,069); Louisville, KY
03/17/2012*; 4:15 pm, CBS	(3 W) No. 11	vs. (6 W) No. 12 Murray State; Third Round	W 62–53	27–7	KFC Yum! Center; Louisville, KY
03/22/2012*; 10:15 pm, TBS	(3 W) No. 11	vs. (7 W) No. 25 Florida; Sweet Sixteen	L 58–68	27–8	US Airways Center (14,913); Phoenix, Arizona
*Non-conference game. ^{#}Rankings from AP Poll. (#) Tournament seedings in parentheses. All times are in Central Time (#) during NCAA Tournament is seed with Region.

== Rankings ==
Ranking movements Legend: ██ Increase in ranking ██ Decrease in ranking
	Week																			
Poll	Pre	1	2	3	4	5	6	7	8	9	10	11	12	13	14	15	16	17	18	Final
AP	22	21	16	16	11	11	10	14	20	25	21	17	15	18	12	10	8	9	11	Not released
Coaches	21	19	17	16	11	11	10	13	20	24	22	18	15	19	13	10	7	9	11	10

*AP does not release post-NCAA tournament rankings
