= 2011–12 Syracuse Orange men's basketball team =

American college basketball season

2011–12 Syracuse Orange men's basketball

NIT Season Tip-Off Champions Big East Season Champions

NCAA Tournament, Elite Eight
- Conference: Big East Conference (1979–2013)

Ranking
- Coaches: No. 5
- AP: No. 2
- Record: 0–3, 34 wins vacated (0–1 (17 wins vacated)) Big East)
- Head coach: Jim Boeheim
- Assistant coaches: Mike Hopkins; Adrian Autry; Gerry McNamara
- Home arena: Carrier Dome

2011–12 Big East men's basketball standings
	Conf.				Overall
Team	W		L	PCT	W		L	PCT
No. 11 Marquette	14	–	4	.778	27	–	8	.771
Notre Dame	13	–	5	.722	22	–	12	.647
Cincinnati	12	–	6	.667	26	–	11	.703
No. 15 Georgetown	12	–	6	.667	24	–	9	.727
South Florida	12	–	6	.667	22	–	14	.611
West Virginia	9	–	9	.500	19	–	14	.576
Connecticut	8	–	10	.444	20	–	14	.588
Seton Hall	8	–	10	.444	21	–	13	.618
Rutgers	6	–	12	.333	14	–	18	.438
St. John's	6	–	12	.333	13	–	19	.406
Pittsburgh	5	–	13	.278	22	–	17	.564
Villanova	5	–	13	.278	13	–	19	.406
Providence	4	–	14	.222	15	–	17	.469
DePaul	3	–	15	.167	12	–	19	.387
*No. 2 Syracuse	0	–	1	.000	0	–	3	.000
**No. 17 Louisville†	0	–	8	.000	0	–	10	.000
† 2012 Big East tournament winner As of March 31, 2012; *Syracuse: 30 reg. season games, 4 postseason games vacated due to sanctions against the program; Disputed record: Syracuse–(34–3)(17–1) **Louisville: 25 reg. season games, 5 postseason games vacated due to sanctions against the program; Disputed record: Louisville–(30-10)(10-8); Rankings from AP Poll

The 2011–12 Syracuse Orange men's basketball team represented Syracuse University in the 2011–12 NCAA Division I men's basketball season. The head coach, Jim Boeheim, served for his 36th year. The team played its home games at the Carrier Dome in Syracuse, New York and is a member of the Big East Conference.

In 2015, Syracuse voluntarily vacated nine wins from this season due to participation of ineligible players. Following an NCAA investigation, all 25 other wins were vacated. Syracuse was, however, allowed to keep their banners and Elite Eight appearance.

== Preseason ==
=== Roster changes ===
Syracuse graduated one starter from the previous year's team, power forward Rick Jackson. Center DaShonte Riley transferred to Eastern Michigan.

=== Recruiting ===
College recruiting
Name	Hometown	School	Height	Weight	Commit date
Michael Carter-Williams; PG	Hamilton, MA	St. Andrew's School	6 ft 4 in (1.93 m)	175 lb (79 kg)	Nov 1, 2009
Michael Carter-Williams; PG	Recruit ratings: Scout: Rivals: (97)				
Rakeem Christmas; C	Philadelphia, PA	Academy of the New Church	6 ft 9 in (2.06 m)	230 lb (100 kg)	Aug 6, 2010
Rakeem Christmas; C	Recruit ratings: Scout: Rivals: (97)				
Trevor Cooney; SG	Wilmington, DE	Sanford School	6 ft 3 in (1.91 m)	180 lb (82 kg)	Feb 26, 2010
Trevor Cooney; SG	Recruit ratings: Scout: Rivals: (94)				
Overall recruit ranking: Scout: #16 Rivals: #11 ESPN: #10
Note: In many cases, Scout, Rivals, 247Sports, On3, and ESPN may conflict in their listings of height and weight.; In these cases, the average was taken. ESPN grades are on a 100-point scale.; Sources: "2011 Syracuse Signees". Rivals.; "2011 Syracuse Signees". Scout.; "2011 Syracuse Signees". ESPN.; "Scout.com Team Recruiting Rankings". Scout.; "2011 Team Ranking". Rivals.

=== Preseason outlook ===
In the Big East preseason Coaches' Poll, Syracuse was predicted to finish tied for first with Connecticut. The Orange received five first place votes and 209 votes overall. Kris Joseph was named to the Preseason All-Big East first team and Scoop Jardine was named to the second team.

== Postseason awards ==
Fab Melo was named the Big East's Defensive Player of the Year and Dion Waiters won the Big East Sixth Man Award. Kris Joseph was named to the All-Big East First Team while Scoop Jardine made the Second Team and Dion Waiters made the Third Team.

The National Association of Basketball Coaches named Joseph to its All-America Second Team.

NBC Sports also named Melo the Big East's Defensive Player of the Year and Waiters the Sixth Man of the Year. NBC named Joseph to its All-Big East First Team and Jardine and Waiters to its Second Team.

CBS Sports named Waiters its national Sixth Man of the Year. It also named Waiters All-Big East First Team and Joseph Second Team.

== Roster ==
2011–12 Syracuse Orange men's basketball team
Players
Coaches

Pos.	#	Name	Height	Weight	Year	Previous school	Hometown
G	1	Michael Carter-Williams	6 ft 5 in (1.96 m)	176 lb (80 kg)	Fr	St. Andrew's	Hamilton, Massachusetts
G	2	Nick Resavy	6 ft 2 in (1.88 m)	201 lb (91 kg)	Sr	West Milford	West Milford, New Jersey
G	3	Dion Waiters	6 ft 4 in (1.93 m)	215 lb (98 kg)	So	Life Center Academy	Philadelphia, Pennsylvania
G	4	Nolan Hart	5 ft 10 in (1.78 m)	152 lb (69 kg)	So	Albany Academy	Albany, New York
F	5	C. J. Fair	6 ft 8 in (2.03 m)	203 lb (92 kg)	So	Brewster Academy	Baltimore, Maryland
G	10	Trevor Cooney (redshirt)	6 ft 4 in (1.93 m)	185 lb (84 kg)	Fr	Sanford	Wilmington, Delaware
G	11	Scoop Jardine	6 ft 2 in (1.88 m)	190 lb (86 kg)	Sr	Neumann-Goretti	Philadelphia, Pennsylvania
C	12	Baye Moussa Keita	6 ft 10 in (2.08 m)	213 lb (97 kg)	So	Oak Hill Academy	Saint Louis, Senegal
G	13	Griffin Hoffmann	6 ft 0 in (1.83 m)	178 lb (81 kg)	Jr	York Preparatory	New York, New York
F	14	Matt Lyde-Cajuste	6 ft 4 in (1.93 m)	205 lb (93 kg)	Jr	Iona Preparatory	Mt. Vernon, New York
G	20	Brandon Triche	6 ft 4 in (1.93 m)	205 lb (93 kg)	Jr	Jamesville-DeWitt	Jamesville, New York
F	21	Mookie Jones	6 ft 6 in (1.98 m)	220 lb (100 kg)	Jr	Peekskill	Peekskill, New York
G	23	Russ DeRemer	6 ft 4 in (1.93 m)	210 lb (95 kg)	So	Xaverian Brothers	Wrentham, Massachusetts
G	24	Brandon Reese	5 ft 11 in (1.8 m)	160 lb (73 kg)	Sr	Pine Crest	Davie, Florida
F	25	Rakeem Christmas	6 ft 9 in (2.06 m)	222 lb (101 kg)	Fr	Academy of the New Church	Bryn Athyn, Pennsylvania
F	32	Kris Joseph	6 ft 7 in (2.01 m)	210 lb (95 kg)	Sr	Archbishop Carroll (DC)	Montreal, Quebec
F	33	Albert Nassar	6 ft 6 in (1.98 m)	195 lb (88 kg)	Fr	South Fork	Stuart, Florida
F	34	Matt Tomaszewski	6 ft 8 in (2.03 m)	215 lb (98 kg)	So	Holderness	Seabrook, New Hampshire
F	43	James Southerland	6 ft 8 in (2.03 m)	210 lb (95 kg)	Jr	Notre Dame Preparatory (MA)	Bayside, New York
C	51	Fab Melo	7 ft 0 in (2.13 m)	244 lb (111 kg)	So	The Sagemont School	Juiz de Fora, Brazil

Head coach

- Jim Boeheim, 36th yr. (Syracuse, 1966)

Assistant coach(es)

- Mike Hopkins, 16th yr. (Syracuse, 1993)
- Gerry McNamara, 3rd yr. (Syracuse, 2007)
- Adrian Autry, 1st yr. (Syracuse, 1994)

Strength and conditioning coach(es)

- Lazarus Sims, 5th yr. (Syracuse, 1996)

Legend

- (C) Team captain
- (S) Suspended
- (I) Ineligible
- (W) Walk-on
- Injured
- Current redshirt

Roster
Last update: 2011-03-13

=== Depth chart ===
Pos.	Starting 5	Bench 1	Bench 2	Bench 3
C	Fab Melo	Baye Keita	Matt Tomaszewski
PF	C.J. Fair	Rakeem Christmas	Matt Lyde-Cajuste
SF	Kris Joseph	James Southerland	Griffin Hoffmann	Albert Nassar
SG	Brandon Triche	Dion Waiters	Nick Resavy	Russ DeRemer
PG	Scoop Jardine	Michael Carter-Williams	Brandon Reese	Nolan Hart

== Schedule ==
Date time, TV	Rank^{#}	Opponent^{#}	Result	Record	High points	High rebounds	High assists	Site (attendance) city, state
Exhibition
Nov. 1*; 7:00 pm, Time Warner SportsNet	No. 5	CSULA (DII)	W 79–49		12 – Melo	9 – Keita	7 – Jardine	Carrier Dome (8,668); Syracuse, NY
Nov. 8*; 7:00 pm, Time Warner SportsNet/SNY	No. 5	St. Rose (DII)	W 87–69		12 – Joseph	7 – Keita	3 – Tied	Carrier Dome (8,110); Syracuse, NY
Regular Season
Nov. 12*; 4:00 pm, Time Warner SportsNet/SNY	No. 5	Fordham	W 78–53	1–0	16 – Joseph	7 – Triche	3 – Tied	Carrier Dome (22,906); Syracuse, NY
Nov. 14*; 7:00 pm, ESPNU	No. 5	Manhattan; NIT Season Tip-Off	W 92–56	2–0	17 – Waiters	9 – Melo	5 – Waiters	Carrier Dome (17,284); Syracuse, NY
Nov. 15*; 7:00 pm, ESPN3	No. 5	Albany; NIT Season Tip-Off	W 98–74	3–0	19 – Tied	9 – Fair	5 – Tied	Carrier Dome (17,189); Syracuse, NY
Nov. 19*; 4:00 pm, Time Warner SportsNet/SNY	No. 5	Colgate	W 92–47	4–0	16 – Waiters	8 – Christmas	6 – Jardine	Carrier Dome (21,084); Syracuse, NY
Nov. 23*; 9:30 pm, ESPN2	No. 5	vs. Virginia Tech; NIT Season Tipoff	W 69–58	5–0	20 – Joseph	10 – Tied	6 – Triche	Madison Square Garden (8,293); New York, NY
Nov. 25*; 5:00 pm, ESPN	No. 5	vs. Stanford; NIT Season Tipoff	W 69–63	6–0	18 – Joseph	9 – Tied	4 – Triche	Madison Square Garden (8,477); New York, NY
Nov. 29*; 7:00 pm, Time Warner SportsNet/SNY	No. 4	Eastern Michigan	W 84–48	7–0	19 – Southerland	6 – Christmas	7 – Jardine	Carrier Dome (19,649); Syracuse, NY
Dec. 2*; 7:00 pm, ESPN	No. 4	No. 10 Florida; SEC–Big East Challenge	W 72–68	8–0	20 – Triche	11 – Fair	7 – Jardine	Carrier Dome (24,459); Syracuse, NY
Dec. 6*; 7:00 pm, Time Warner SportsNet/SNY	No. 3	Marshall	W 62–56	9–0	15 – Waiters	8 – Joseph	4 – Jardine	Carrier Dome (19,817); Syracuse, NY
Dec. 10*; 7:00 pm, Time Warner SportsNet/SNY	No. 3	George Washington	W 85–50	10–0	19 – Waiters	8 – Joseph	8 – Carter-Williams	Carrier Dome (23,226); Syracuse, NY
Dec. 17*; 6:30 pm, ESPN2	No. 1	at NC State	W 88–72	11–0	22 – Waiters	6 – Melo	4 – Tied	RBC Center (19,400); Raleigh, NC
Dec. 20*; 7:00 pm, Time Warner SportsNet/SNY	No. 1	Bucknell	W 80–61	12–0	17 – Joseph	9 – Melo	4 – Tied	Carrier Dome (17,302); Syracuse, NY
Dec. 22*; 7:00 pm, Time Warner SportsNet/SNY	No. 1	Tulane	W 80–61	13–0	15 – Waiters	5 – Tied	3 – Tied	Carrier Dome (18,679); Syracuse, NY
Big East Regular Season
Dec. 28; 7:00 pm, Big East Network/MSG	No. 1	Seton Hall	W 75–49	14–0 (1–0)	15 – Waiters	8 – Fair	4 – Tied	Carrier Dome (25,081); Syracuse, NY
Jan. 1; 5:00 pm, Big East Network/SNY	No. 1	at DePaul	W 87–68	15–0 (2–0)	22 – Joseph	7 – Joseph	3 – Tied	Allstate Arena (12,102); Rosemont, IL
Jan. 4; 9:00 pm, Big East Network/SNY	No. 1	at Providence	W 87–73	16–0 (3–0)	16 – Triche	5 – Christmas	11 – Jardine	Dunkin' Donuts Center (12,252); Providence, RI
Jan. 7; 4:00 pm, Big East Network/SNY	No. 1	No. 20 Marquette	W 73–66	17–0 (4–0)	17 – Joseph	8 – Tied	7 – Waiters	Carrier Dome (25,412); Syracuse, NY
Jan. 11; 7:00 pm, ESPN2	No. 1	at Villanova	W 79–66	18–0 (5–0)	20 – Waiters	7 – Keita	5 – Jardine	Wells Fargo Center (14,877); Philadelphia, PA
Jan. 14; 6:00 pm, Big East Network/SNY	No. 1	Providence	W 78–55	19–0 (6–0)	13 – Joseph	6 – Fair	9 – Jardine	Carrier Dome (23,311); Syracuse, NY
Jan. 16; 7:30 pm, ESPN	No. 1	Pittsburgh	W 71–63	20–0 (7–0)	16 – Waiters	10 – Melo	10 – Jardine	Carrier Dome (24,826); Syracuse, NY
Jan. 21; 6:00 pm, ESPN	No. 1	at Notre Dame	L 58–67	20–1 (7–1)	15 – Southerland	5 – Joseph	7 – Jardine	Purcell Pavilion (9,149); Notre Dame, IN
Jan. 23; 7:00 pm, ESPN	No. 3	at Cincinnati	W 60–53	21–1 (8–1)	17 – Joseph	9 – Christmas	6 – Jardine	Fifth Third Arena (13,176); Cincinnati, OH
Jan. 28; 1:00 pm, ESPNU	No. 3	West Virginia	W 63–61	22–1 (9–1)	18 – Triche	7 – Joseph	5 – Jardine	Carrier Dome (28,740); Syracuse, NY
Feb. 4; 12:00 pm, ESPN	No. 2	at St. John's	W 95–70	23–1 (10–1)	14 – Tied	8 – Joseph	5 – Triche	Madison Square Garden (19,979); New York, NY
Feb. 8; 7:00 pm, ESPN	No. 2	No. 11 Georgetown; Rivalry	W 64–61 ^{OT}	24–1 (11–1)	29 – Joseph	9 – Fair	8 – Jardine	Carrier Dome (27,820); Syracuse, NY
Feb. 11; 1:00 pm, CBS	No. 2	Connecticut; Rivalry	W 85–67	25–1 (12–1)	21 – Jardine	12 – Fair	6 – Jardine	Carrier Dome (33,430); Syracuse, NY
Feb. 13; 7:00 pm, ESPN	No. 2	at No. 19 Louisville	W 52–51	26–1 (13–1)	13 – Fair	6 – Tied	5 – Jardine	KFC Yum! Center (22,738); Louisville, KY
Feb. 19; 1:00 pm, ESPN	No. 2	at Rutgers	W 74–64	27–1 (14–1)	21 – Fair	8 – Fair	7 – Jardine	Louis Brown Athletic Center (8,093); Piscataway, NJ
Feb. 22; 7:00 pm, Big East Network/SNY	No. 2	South Florida	W 56–48	28–1 (15–1)	15 – Jardine	9 – Joseph	4 – Jardine	Carrier Dome (25,316); Syracuse, NY
Feb. 25; 9:00 pm, ESPN	No. 2	at Connecticut; Rivalry and ESPN College GameDay	W 71–69	29–1 (16–1)	21 – Joseph	9 – Melo	6 – Jardine	Gampel Pavilion (10,167); Storrs, CT
Mar. 3; 4:00 pm, CBS	No. 2	No. 19 Louisville	W 58–49	30–1 (17–1)	18 – Triche	8 – Melo	4 – Triche	Carrier Dome (33,205); Syracuse, NY
2012 Big East men's basketball tournament
Mar. 8; 12:00 pm, ESPN	No. 2	vs. Connecticut; Quarterfinals/Rivalry	W 58–55	31–1	18 – Waiters	7 – Triche	4 – Carter-Williams	Madison Square Garden (20,057); New York, NY
Mar. 9; 7:00 pm, ESPN	No. 2	vs. Cincinnati; Semifinals	L 68–71	31–2	28 – Waiters	11 – Fair	4 – Tied	Madison Square Garden (20,057); New York, NY
2012 NCAA Division I men's basketball tournament
Mar. 15; 3:10 pm, truTV	No. 2 (1)	vs. (16) UNC Asheville; Second Round	W 72–65	32–2	15 – Southerland	8 – Tied	7 – Jardine	Consol Energy Center (18,927); Pittsburgh, PA
Mar. 17; 12:15 pm, CBS	No. 2 (1)	vs. (8) Kansas State; Third Round	W 75–59	33–2	18 – Waiters	11 – Christmas	8 – Jardine	Consol Energy Center (18,588); Pittsburgh, PA
Mar. 22; 7:15 pm, CBS	No. 2 (1)	vs. No. 14 (4) Wisconsin; Sweet Sixteen	W 64–63	34–2	15 – Fair	7 – Fair	4 – Jardine	TD Garden (18,796); Boston, MA
Mar. 24; 7:05 pm, CBS	No. 2 (1)	vs. No. 7 (2) Ohio State; Elite Eight	L 70–77	34–3	15 – Triche	10 – Keita	6 – Jardine	TD Garden (19,026); Boston, MA
*Non-conference game. ^{#}Rankings from AP poll.. (#) Tournament seedings in parentheses. All times are in Eastern Time.

== Rankings ==
Ranking movement Legend: ██ Improvement in ranking. ██ Decrease in ranking. ██ Not ranked the previous week. RV=Others receiving votes.
Poll	Pre	Wk 1	Wk 2	Wk 3	Wk 4	Wk 5	Wk 6	Wk 7	Wk 8	Wk 9	Wk 10	Wk 11	Wk 12	Wk 13	Wk 14	Wk 15	Wk 16	WK 17	Wk 18	Final
AP	5	5	5	4	3	1	1	1	1	1	1	3	2	2	2	2	2	2	2	*
Coaches	5	5	5	3	3	1	1	1	1	1	1	4	2	2	2	2	2	2	2	5

== 2012–13 Recruiting ==
College recruiting
Name	Hometown	School	Height	Weight	Commit date
DaJuan Coleman; C	DeWitt, NY	Jamesville-DeWitt High School	6 ft 8 in (2.03 m)	280 lb (130 kg)	Oct 25, 2011
DaJuan Coleman; C	Recruit ratings: Scout: Rivals: (97)				
Jerami Grant; PF	Hyattsville, MD	DeMatha Catholic High School	6 ft 7 in (2.01 m)	200 lb (91 kg)	Sep 16, 2011
Jerami Grant; PF	Recruit ratings: Scout: Rivals: (95)				
Overall recruit ranking: Scout: #11 ESPN: #15
Note: In many cases, Scout, Rivals, 247Sports, On3, and ESPN may conflict in their listings of height and weight.; In these cases, the average was taken. ESPN grades are on a 100-point scale.; Sources: "2012 Syracuse Signees". Rivals.; "2012 Syracuse Signees". Scout.; "2012 Syracuse Signees". ESPN.; "Scout.com Team Recruiting Rankings". Scout.; "2012 Team Ranking". Rivals.
