= 2012 NCAA Division I men's basketball tournament =

Edition of USA college basketball tournament

- Teams: 68
- Finals site: Mercedes-Benz Superdome, New Orleans, Louisiana
- Champions: Kentucky Wildcats (8th title, 11th title game, 15th Final Four)
- Runner-up: Kansas Jayhawks (9th title game, 14th Final Four)
- Semifinalists: Louisville Cardinals* (vacated) (9th Final Four); Ohio State Buckeyes (11th Final Four)
- Winning coach: John Calipari (1st title)
- MOP: Anthony Davis (Kentucky)

The 2012 NCAA Division I men's basketball tournament involved 68 teams playing in a single-elimination tournament that determined the National Collegiate Athletic Association (NCAA) Division I men's basketball national champion for the 2011-12 season. The 74th edition of the tournament began on March 13, 2012, and concluded with the championship game on April 2, at the Mercedes-Benz Superdome in New Orleans, Louisiana.

The Final Four consisted of Kentucky, making their second appearance in the Final Four under John Calipari, Louisville, making their second appearance under Rick Pitino and first since 2005, Kansas, making their first appearance since winning the 2008 national championship under head coach Bill Self by defeating Calipari's Memphis team, and Ohio State, making their first appearance since their runner-up finish in 2007 and second under coach Thad Matta. This was the first (and only) tournament that both national semifinals and the national championship game were regular season rematches. Kentucky defeated Kansas in the championship game 67–59 to win their first national championship since Tubby Smith led the team there in 1998. This was Calipari's first national championship in four trips to the Final Four, having previously gone there with Kentucky in 2011, Memphis in 2008 and Massachusetts in 1996.

Upsets were once again the story of the tournament in 2012, and for the first time ever two #15 seeds won in the same tournament. In the South Region, #15 Lehigh of the Patriot League defeated #2 Duke. In the West Region, #15 Norfolk State of the MEAC, making their first ever NCAA tournament appearance, defeated #2 Missouri as a 21.5 point underdog, the second biggest upset in terms of point spread in NCAA tournament history, behind Fairleigh Dickinson's defeat of Purdue in 2023, where Purdue was a 23.5 point favorite.

In addition to this, Ohio won a game as a double digit seed for the second time in four tournaments as the #13 seed Bobcats defeated #4 seed Michigan to advance to the third round of the Midwest Region. A team from the First Four games also won in the Round of 64 for the second consecutive year as South Florida defeated Midwest #5 seed Temple, setting up a #12 vs. #13 matchup that Ohio won.

VCU, a Final Four team from 2011 as an #11 seed, made the 2012 tournament as a #12 seed and once again made the round of 32 by defeating South #5 seed Wichita State. The South Region saw four double digit seeds win in their opening games, as Colorado and Xavier joined VCU and Lehigh as victors. Xavier advanced to the Sweet Sixteen, where they were defeated by Baylor.

Despite the upsets, all four top seeds advanced to the Sweet Sixteen for the first time since 2009. Three made it to the Elite Eight, as only Michigan State of the West Region lost. Kentucky was the only one to advance to the Final Four as Syracuse and North Carolina lost in their regional finals. This would end up being the last Final Four until 2019 that did not include at least one team seeded #7 or higher, and still is the last Final Four to not include at least one team seeded #5 or higher as of the conclusion of the 2024 season.

Two teams made their first NCAA tournament appearances in school history: MEAC champion Norfolk State and Summit League champion South Dakota State. Ivy League champion Harvard made its first appearance since 1946, ending the longest tournament drought in NCAA history.

All four teams from the state of Ohio (Cincinnati, Ohio, Ohio State, and Xavier) made it to the Sweet 16, marking the first time in tournament history any state has been represented by four teams in the round of 16. This tournament was also the first tournament since 1985 to feature no teams in the Sweet 16 from the Mountain or Pacific Time Zones.

== Tournament procedure ==
A total of 68 teams entered the tournament. Thirty out of 31 automatic bids were given to the teams that won their conference tournament. The remaining automatic bid was awarded to the Ivy League regular season champion since they do not hold a conference tournament. The remaining 37 teams were granted "at-large" bids, which were extended by the NCAA Selection Committee on March 11.

Eight teams (the four-lowest seeded automatic qualifiers and the four lowest-seeded at-large teams) played in the First Four. The winners of those games advanced to the main tournament bracket.

For the first time ever, the Selection Committee publicly disclosed the overall rankings for each team, which are listed below.

== Schedule and venues ==
2012 First Four (orange), and first and second rounds (green)
2012 Regionals (blue) and Final Four (red)

The following are the sites selected to host each round of the 2012 tournament:

First Four

- March 13 and 14
  - University of Dayton Arena, Dayton, Ohio (host: University of Dayton)

First and second rounds

- March 15 and 17
  - Rose Garden, Portland, Oregon (host: University of Oregon)
  - University Arena ("The Pit"), Albuquerque, New Mexico (host: University of New Mexico)
  - Consol Energy Center, Pittsburgh, Pennsylvania (host: Duquesne University)
  - KFC Yum! Center, Louisville, Kentucky (host: University of Louisville)
- March 16 and 18
  - Nationwide Arena, Columbus, Ohio (host: Ohio State University)
  - CenturyLink Center Omaha, Omaha, Nebraska (host: Creighton University)
  - Bridgestone Arena, Nashville, Tennessee (host: Ohio Valley Conference)
  - Greensboro Coliseum, Greensboro, North Carolina (host: Atlantic Coast Conference)

Regional semifinals and finals (Sweet Sixteen and Elite Eight)

- March 22 and 24
  - East Regional
    - TD Garden, Boston, Massachusetts (host: Boston College)
  - West Regional
    - US Airways Center, Phoenix, Arizona (host: Arizona State University)
- March 23 and 25
  - Midwest Regional
    - Edward Jones Dome, St. Louis, Missouri (host: Saint Louis University)
  - South Regional
    - Georgia Dome, Atlanta, Georgia (host: Georgia Institute of Technology)

National semifinals and championship (Final Four and championship)

- March 31 and April 2
  - Mercedes-Benz Superdome (host: Tulane University)

New Orleans hosted the Final Four for the fifth time, having previously hosted in 2003.

== Qualification and selection teams ==

=== Automatic bids ===
The following teams were automatic qualifiers for the 2012 NCAA field by virtue of winning their conference's tournament (except for the Ivy League, whose regular-season champion received the automatic bid).

Conference	School	Appearance	Last bid
America East	Vermont	5th	2010
Atlantic 10	St. Bonaventure	6th	2000
ACC	Florida State	14th	2011
Atlantic Sun	Belmont	5th	2011
Big 12	Missouri	25th	2011
Big East	Louisville	38th	2011
Big Sky	Montana	9th	2010
Big South	UNC Asheville	3rd	2011
Big Ten	Michigan State	26th	2011
Big West	Long Beach State	6th	2007
Colonial	VCU	12th	2011
C-USA	Memphis	24th	2011
Horizon	Detroit	6th	1999
Ivy League	Harvard	2nd	1946
MAAC	Loyola (MD)	2nd	1994
MAC	Ohio	12th	2010
MEAC	Norfolk State	1st	Never
Missouri Valley	Creighton	17th	2007
Mountain West	New Mexico	13th	2010
Northeast	Long Island	5th	2011
Ohio Valley	Murray State	15th	2010
Pac-12	Colorado	11th	2003
Patriot	Lehigh	5th	2010
SEC	Vanderbilt	13th	2011
Southern	Davidson	11th	2008
Southland	Lamar	6th	2000
SWAC	Mississippi Valley State	5th	2008
Summit	South Dakota State	1st	Never
Sun Belt	Western Kentucky	22nd	2009
West Coast	Saint Mary's	7th	2010
WAC	New Mexico State	19th	2010

== Tournament seeds (list by region) ==
East Regional – Boston, Massachusetts
Seed	School	Conference	Record	Berth type	Last bid	Overall rank
1	Syracuse	Big East	31–2	At-large	2011	2
2	Ohio State	Big Ten	27–7	At-large	2011	7
3	Florida State	ACC	24–9	Automatic	2011	11
4	Wisconsin	Big Ten	24–9	At-large	2011	14
5	Vanderbilt	SEC	24–10	Automatic	2011	18
6	Cincinnati	Big East	24–10	At-large	2011	22
7	Gonzaga	West Coast	25–6	At-large	2011	27
8	Kansas State	Big 12	21–10	At-large	2011	32
9	Southern Miss	C-USA	25–8	At-large	1991	35
10	West Virginia	Big East	19–13	At-large	2011	38
11	Texas	Big 12	20–13	At-large	2011	43
12	Harvard	Ivy League	26–4	Automatic	1946	46
13	Montana	Big Sky	25–6	Automatic	2010	55
14	St. Bonaventure	Atlantic 10	20–11	Automatic	2000	58
15	Loyola	MAAC	24–8	Automatic	1994	59
16	UNC Asheville	Big South	24–9	Automatic	2011	64

South Regional – Atlanta, Georgia
Seed	School	Conference	Record	Berth type	Last bid	Overall rank
1	Kentucky	SEC	32–2	At-large	2011	1
2	Duke	ACC	27–6	At-large	2011	6
3	Baylor	Big 12	27–7	At-large	2010	9
4	Indiana	Big Ten	25–8	At-large	2008	15
5	Wichita State	Missouri Valley	27–5	At-large	2006	19
6	UNLV	Mountain West	26–8	At-large	2011	21
7	Notre Dame	Big East	22–11	At-large	2011	25
8	Iowa State	Big 12	22–10	At-large	2005	30
9	Connecticut	Big East	20–13	At-large	2011	34
10	Xavier	Atlantic 10	21–12	At-large	2011	40
11	Colorado	Pac-12	23–11	Automatic	2003	44
12	VCU	Colonial	28–6	Automatic	2011	49
13	New Mexico State	WAC	26–9	Automatic	2010	54
14	South Dakota State	Summit	27–7	Automatic	Never	56
15	Lehigh	Patriot	26–7	Automatic	2010	60
16*	Mississippi Valley State	SWAC	21–12	Automatic	2008	67
16*	Western Kentucky	Sun Belt	15–18	Automatic	2009	68

Midwest Regional – St. Louis, Missouri
Seed	School	Conference	Record	Berth type	Last bid	Overall rank
1	North Carolina	ACC	29–5	At-large	2011	3
2	Kansas	Big 12	27–6	At-large	2011	5
3	Georgetown	Big East	23–8	At-large	2011	12
4	Michigan	Big Ten	24–9	At-large	2011	13
5	Temple	Atlantic 10	24–7	At-large	2011	17
6	San Diego State	Mountain West	26–7	At-large	2011	24
7	Saint Mary's	West Coast	27–5	Automatic	2010	26
8	Creighton	Missouri Valley	28–5	Automatic	2007	29
9	Alabama	SEC	21–11	At-large	2006	33
10	Purdue	Big Ten	21–12	At-large	2011	37
11	NC State	ACC	22–12	At-large	2006	42
12*	California	Pac-12	24–9	At-large	2010	45
12*	South Florida	Big East	20–13	At-large	1992	47
13	Ohio	MAC	27–7	Automatic	2010	52
14	Belmont	Atlantic Sun	27–7	Automatic	2011	57
15	Detroit Mercy	Horizon	22–13	Automatic	1999	61
16*	Lamar	Southland	23–11	Automatic	2000	65
16*	Vermont	America East	23–11	Automatic	2010	66

West Regional – Phoenix, Arizona
Seed	School	Conference	Record	Berth type	Last bid	Overall rank
1	Michigan State	Big Ten	27–7	Automatic	2011	4
2	Missouri	Big 12	30–4	Automatic	2011	8
3	Marquette	Big East	25–7	At-large	2011	10
4	Louisville	Big East	26–9	Automatic	2011	16
5	New Mexico	Mountain West	27–6	Automatic	2010	20
6	Murray State	Ohio Valley	30–1	Automatic	2010	23
7	Florida	SEC	23–10	At-large	2011	28
8	Memphis	C-USA	26–8	Automatic	2011	31
9	Saint Louis	Atlantic 10	25–7	At-large	2000	36
10	Virginia	ACC	22–9	At-large	2007	39
11	Colorado State	Mountain West	20–11	At-large	2003	41
12	Long Beach State	Big West	25–8	Automatic	2007	51
13	Davidson	Southern	25–7	Automatic	2008	53
14*	BYU	West Coast	25–8	At-large	2011	48
14*	Iona	MAAC	25–7	At-large	2006	50
15	Norfolk State	MEAC	25–9	Automatic	Never	62
16	LIU-Brooklyn	Northeast	25–8	Automatic	2011	63

*See First Four.

== Bracket ==
Unless otherwise noted, all times listed are Eastern Daylight Time (UTC-04).

=== First Four – Dayton, Ohio ===
The First Four games involved eight teams: the four overall lowest-ranked teams, and the four lowest-ranked at-large teams.

South #16 seed March 13
16	Mississippi Valley State	58
16	Western Kentucky	59

Midwest #16 seed March 14
16	Lamar	59
16	Vermont	71

West #14 seed March 13
14	BYU	78
14	Iona	72

Midwest #12 seed March 14
12	California	54
12	South Florida	65

Both games on March 13 saw historic comebacks:

- In the opener, Western Kentucky trailed by 16 points with 4:51 remaining before storming back to win 59–58. It was the largest comeback in the last five minutes of an NCAA tournament game; the previous record was 15 by Illinois against Arizona in the 2005 Elite Eight.
- In the second game of the night, BYU set a record for the largest comeback in an NCAA tournament game, as they were down by 25 points at one point and came back to beat Iona 78–72. The largest previous deficit overcome in the tournament was 22 points by Duke against Maryland in the 2001 national semifinals.

In addition, the March 13 session was notable for the attendance of Barack Obama, president of the United States, and David Cameron, prime minister of Great Britain. Cameron was in the U.S. for bilateral political and economic talks with Obama, and attended the Mississippi Valley-Western Kentucky game.

=== South Regional – Atlanta, Georgia ===
First round March 15–16
1	Kentucky	81
16	Western Kentucky	66
Louisville – Thu/Sat
8	Iowa State	77
9	Connecticut	64
5	Wichita State	59
12	VCU	62
Portland – Thu/Sat
4	Indiana	79
13	New Mexico State	66
6	UNLV	64
11	Colorado	68
Albuquerque – Thu/Sat
3	Baylor	68
14	South Dakota State	60
7	Notre Dame	63
10	Xavier	67
Greensboro – Fri/Sun
2	Duke	70
15	Lehigh	75

Second round March 17–18
1	Kentucky	87
8	Iowa State	71
12	VCU	61
4	Indiana	63
11	Colorado	63
3	Baylor	80
10	Xavier	70
15	Lehigh	58

Regional semifinals March 23
1	Kentucky	102
4	Indiana	90
3	Baylor	75
10	Xavier	70

Regional finals March 25
1	Kentucky	82
3	Baylor	70

==== South regional final ====
CBS

March 25
2:20 p.m. EDT

Box Score

#3 Baylor Bears 70, #1 Kentucky Wildcats 82
Scoring by half: 22–42, 48–40
Pts: Q. Acy, 22; Rebs: tied, 8 Asts: P. Jackson, 5	Pts: M. Kidd-Gilchrist, 19; Rebs: A. Davis, 11; Asts: T. Jones, 6

Georgia Dome – Atlanta, Georgia
Attendance: 24,035
Referees: Les Jones, Bryan Kersey, Mike Stuart

==== South Regional all-tournament team ====
Regional all-tournament team: Quincy Acy, Baylor; Anthony Davis, Kentucky; Doron Lamb, Kentucky; Christian Watford, Indiana.

Regional most outstanding player: Michael Kidd-Gilchrist, Kentucky

=== West Regional – Phoenix, Arizona ===
First round March 15–16
1	Michigan State	89
16	Long Island	67
Columbus – Fri/Sun
8	Memphis	54
9	Saint Louis	61
5	New Mexico	75
12	Long Beach State	68
Portland – Thu/Sat
4	~~Louisville~~	69
13	Davidson	62
6	Murray State	58
11	Colorado State	41
Louisville – Thu/Sat
3	Marquette	88
14	BYU	68
7	Florida	71
10	Virginia	45
Omaha – Fri/Sun
2	Missouri	84
15	Norfolk State	86

Second round March 17–18
1	Michigan State	65
9	Saint Louis	61
5	New Mexico	56
4	~~Louisville~~	59
6	Murray State	53
3	Marquette	62
7	Florida	84
15	Norfolk State	50

Regional semifinals March 22
1	Michigan State	44
4	~~Louisville~~	57
3	Marquette	58
7	Florida	68

Regional finals March 24
4	~~Louisville~~	72
7	Florida	68

==== West regional final ====
CBS

March 24
4:30 p.m. EDT

Box Score

#7 Florida Gators 68, #4 Louisville Cardinals 72
Scoring by half: 41–33, 27–39
Pts: tied, 14; Rebs: E. Murphy, 8 Asts: E. Walker, 7	Pts: R. Smith, 19; Rebs: C. Behanan, 7 Asts: P. Siva, 8

US Airways Center – Phoenix, Arizona
Attendance: 13,456
Referees: Karl Hess, Verne Harris, Doug Sirmons

==== West Regional all-tournament team ====
Regional all-tournament team: Bradley Beal, Florida; Gorgui Dieng, Louisville; Draymond Green, Michigan State; Peyton Siva, Louisville.

Regional most outstanding player: Chane Behanan, Louisville

=== East Regional – Boston, Massachusetts ===
First round March 15–16
1	Syracuse	72
16	UNC Asheville	65
Pittsburgh – Thu/Sat
8	Kansas State	70
9	Southern Miss	64
5	Vanderbilt	79
12	Harvard	70
Albuquerque – Thu/Sat
4	Wisconsin	73
13	Montana	49
6	Cincinnati	65
11	Texas	59
Nashville – Fri/Sun
3	Florida State	66
14	St. Bonaventure	63
7	Gonzaga	77
10	West Virginia	54
Pittsburgh – Thu/Sat
2	Ohio State	78
15	Loyola (MD)	59

Second round March 17–18
1	Syracuse	75
8	Kansas State	59
5	Vanderbilt	57
4	Wisconsin	60
6	Cincinnati	62
3	Florida State	56
7	Gonzaga	66
2	Ohio State	73

Regional semifinals March 22
1	Syracuse	64
4	Wisconsin	63
6	Cincinnati	66
2	Ohio State	81

Regional finals March 24
1	Syracuse	70
2	Ohio State	77

==== East regional final ====
CBS

March 24
7:05 p.m. EDT

Box Score

#2 Ohio State Buckeyes 77, #1 Syracuse Orange 70
Scoring by half: 29–29, 48–41
Pts: J. Sullinger, 19; Rebs: tied, 9 Asts: A. Craft, 4	Pts: B. Triche, 15; Rebs: B. M. Keita, 10; Asts: S. Jardine, 6

TD Garden – Boston, Massachusetts
Attendance: 19,026
Referees: John Higgins, Mike Nance, Tom O'Neill

==== East Regional all-tournament team ====
Regional all-tournament team: Scoop Jardine, Syracuse; Lenzelle Smith, Jr., Ohio State; Jordan Taylor, Wisconsin; Deshaun Thomas, Ohio State.

Regional most outstanding player: Jared Sullinger, Ohio State

=== Midwest Regional – St. Louis, Missouri ===
First round March 16
1	North Carolina	77
16	Vermont	58
Greensboro – Fri/Sun
8	Creighton	58
9	Alabama	57
5	Temple	44
12	South Florida	58
Nashville – Fri/Sun
4	Michigan	60
13	Ohio	65
6	San Diego State	65
11	NC State	79
Columbus – Fri/Sun
3	Georgetown	74
14	Belmont	59
7	Saint Mary's	69
10	Purdue	72
Omaha – Fri/Sun
2	Kansas	65
15	Detroit	50

Second round March 18
1	North Carolina	87
8	Creighton	73
12	South Florida	56
13	Ohio	62
11	NC State	66
3	Georgetown	63
10	Purdue	60
2	Kansas	63

Regional semifinals March 23
1	North Carolina	73^{OT}
13	Ohio	65
11	NC State	57
2	Kansas	60

Regional finals March 25
1	North Carolina	67
2	Kansas	80

==== Midwest regional final ====
CBS

March 25
5:05 p.m. EDT

Box Score

#2 Kansas Jayhawks 80, #1 North Carolina Tar Heels 67
Scoring by half: 47–47, 33–20
Pts: T. Taylor, 22; Rebs: T. Robinson, 9 Asts: T. Taylor, 5	Pts: J. M. McAdoo, 15; Rebs: T. Zeller, 6 Asts: S. White, 7

Edward Jones Dome – St. Louis, Missouri
Attendance: 24,107
Referees: Tony Greene, Doug Shows, James Breeding

==== Midwest Regional all-tournament team ====
Regional all-tournament team: Walter Offutt, Ohio; Tyshawn Taylor, Kansas; Jeff Withey, Kansas; Tyler Zeller, North Carolina.

Regional most outstanding player: Thomas Robinson, Kansas

=== Final Four – Mercedes-Benz Superdome, New Orleans, Louisiana ===
National Semifinals; Final Four; Saturday, March 31
S1	Kentucky	69
W4	~~Louisville~~	61
E2	Ohio State	62
MW2	Kansas	64

National championship game Monday, April 2
S1	Kentucky	67
MW2	Kansas	59

On February 20, 2018, the NCAA announced that the wins and records for the 2011–12 season and Louisville's 2012–13, 2013–14, and 2014–15 seasons were vacated due to the sex scandal at Louisville. Unlike forfeiture, a vacated game does not result in the other school being credited with a win, only with Louisville removing the wins from its own record.

==== Final Four all-tournament team ====
Final Four all-tournament team: Anthony Davis, Kentucky; Michael Kidd-Gilchrist, Kentucky; Doron Lamb, Kentucky; Thomas Robinson, Kansas; Tyshawn Taylor, Kansas

Final Four most outstanding player: Anthony Davis, Kentucky

== Game summaries ==
=== Final Four ===
CBS

March 31
6:09 pm

Box score

#W4 ~~Louisville Cardinals~~ 61, #S1 Kentucky Wildcats 69
Scoring by half: 28–35, 33–34
Pts: P. Siva 11; Rebs: G. Dieng 12; Asts: P. Siva 3	Pts: A. Davis 18; Rebs: A. Davis 14; Asts: M. Teague 5

Mercedes-Benz Superdome – New Orleans, LA
Attendance: 73,361
Referees: Les Jones, Doug Shows, Joe DeRosa

CBS

March 31
9:05 pm

Box score

#E2 Ohio State Buckeyes 62, #MW2 Kansas Jayhawks 64
Scoring by half: 34–25, 28–39
Pts: W. Buford 19; Rebs: J. Sullinger 11; Asts: A. Craft 3	Pts: T. Robinson 18; Rebs: E. Johnson 10; Asts: T. Taylor 9

Mercedes-Benz Superdome – New Orleans, LA
Attendance: 73,361
Referees: Jamie Luckie, Tom Eades, Patrick Adams

=== National Championship ===
CBS

April 2
9:23 pm

Recap, Box score

Kansas Jayhawks 59, Kentucky Wildcats 67
Scoring by half: 27–41, 32–26
Pts: T. Taylor 19; Rebs: T. Robinson 17; Asts: T. Taylor 3	Pts: D. Lamb 22; Rebs: A. Davis 16; Asts: A. Davis 5

Mercedes-Benz Superdome – New Orleans, LA
Attendance: 70,913
Referees: Verne Harris, Mark Whitehead, Mike Stuart

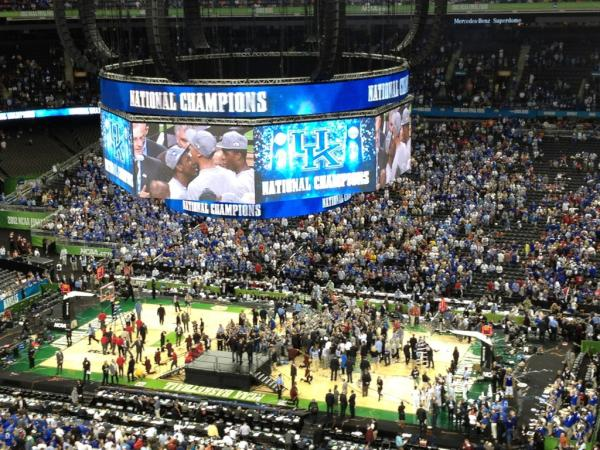
Kentucky celebrating their 2012 NCAA Championship

== Upsets ==
Per the NCAA, "Upsets are defined as when the winner of the game was seeded five or more places lower than the team it defeated."

The 2012 tournament saw a total of eight upsets, with seven in the first round and one in the second round.

Upsets in the 2012 NCAA Division I men's basketball tournament
Round	South	West	East	Midwest
Round of 64	No. 15 Lehigh defeated No. 2 Duke, 75–70; No. 12 VCU defeated No. 5 Wichita State, 62–59; No. 11 Colorado defeated No. 6 UNLV, 68–64	No. 15 Norfolk State defeated No. 2 Missouri, 86–84	None	No. 13 Ohio defeated No. 4 Michigan, 65–60; No. 12 South Florida defeated No. 5 Temple, 58–44; No. 11 NC State defeated No. 6 San Diego State, 79–65
Round of 32	None			No. 11 NC State defeated No. 3 Georgetown, 66–63
Sweet 16	None			
Elite 8	None			
Final 4	None			
National Championship	None			

== Record by conference ==
Conference	# of bids	Record	Win %	R64	R32	S16	E8	F4	CG	NC
SEC	4	10–3	.769	4	3	2	2	1	1	1
Big 12	6	10–6	.625	6	4	2	2	1	1	–
Big Ten	6	11–6	.647	6	5	4	1	1	–	–
Big East	9	14–9	.609	9	6	4	2	1	–	–
ACC	5	6–5	.545	5	3	2	1	–	–	–
Atlantic 10	4	3–4	.429	4	2	1	–	–	–	–
MAC	1	2–1	.667	1	1	1	0	–	–	–
Mountain West	4	1–4	.200	4	1	0	–	–	–	–
WCC	3	2–3	.400	3	1	0	–	–	–	–
MVC	2	1–2	.333	2	1	0	–	–	–	–
CAA	1	1–1	.500	1	1	0	–	–	–	–
MEAC	1	1–1	.500	1	1	0	–	–	–	–
OVC	1	1–1	.500	1	1	0	–	–	–	–
Patriot	1	1–1	.500	1	1	0	–	–	–	–
Pac-12	2	1–2	.333	1	1	0	–	–	–	–
C-USA	2	0–2	.000	2	0	–	–	–	–	–
MAAC	2	0–2	.000	1	0	–	–	–	–	–
America East	1	1–1	.500	1	0	–	–	–	–	–
Sun Belt	1	1–1	.500	1	0	–	–	–	–	–
Atlantic Sun	1	0–1	.000	1	0	–	–	–	–	–
Big Sky	1	0–1	.000	1	0	–	–	–	–	–
Big South	1	0–1	.000	1	0	–	–	–	–	–
Big West	1	0–1	.000	1	0	–	–	–	–	–
Horizon	1	0–1	.000	1	0	–	–	–	–	–
Ivy	1	0–1	.000	1	0	–	–	–	–	–
NEC	1	0–1	.000	1	0	–	–	–	–	–
Southern	1	0–1	.000	1	0	–	–	–	–	–
Summit	1	0–1	.000	1	0	–	–	–	–	–
WAC	1	0–1	.000	1	0	–	–	–	–	–
Southland	1	0–1	.000	0	–	–	–	–	–	–
SWAC	1	0–1	.000	0	–	–	–	–	–	–

- The R64, R32, S16, E8, F4, CG, and NC columns indicate how many teams from each conference were in the round of 64 (second round), round of 32 (third round), Sweet 16, Elite Eight, Final Four, championship game, and national champion, respectively.

== Media ==
=== Television ===
2012 marked the second year of a 14-year partnership between CBS Sports and Turner Broadcasting cable networks TBS, TNT and truTV to cover the entire tournament under the NCAA March Madness banner. CBS aired the Final Four and championship rounds for the 31st consecutive year.

==== Studio hosts ====
- Greg Gumbel (New York City and New Orleans) – Second round, third round, regionals, Final Four and national championship game
- Ernie Johnson Jr. (New York City and Atlanta) – First Four, second round, third round and regional semi-finals
- Matt Winer (Atlanta) – First Four, second round and third round

==== Studio analysts ====
- Greg Anthony (New York City and New Orleans) – First Four, second round, third round, regionals, Final Four and national championship game
- Charles Barkley (New York City and New Orleans) – First Four, second round, third round, regionals, Final Four and national championship game
- Mike Brey (Atlanta) – third round
- Seth Davis (Atlanta and New Orleans) – First Four, second round, third round, regional semi-finals, Final Four and national championship game
- Steve Lavin (New York City) – third round
- Frank Martin (New York City) – Regional finals
- Shaka Smart (Atlanta) – Regional Semi-Finals
- Kenny Smith (New York City and New Orleans) – First Four, second round, third round, regionals, Final Four and national championship game
- Steve Smith (Atlanta) – First Four, second round, third round and regional semi-finals
- Jay Wright (Atlanta) – First Four and second round

==== Commentary teams ====
- Jim Nantz/Clark Kellogg/Steve Kerr/Tracy Wolfson – First Four at Dayton, Ohio; second and third round at Greensboro, North Carolina; South Regionals at Atlanta, Georgia; Final Four at New Orleans, Louisiana
  Kerr joined Nantz and Kellogg during the First Four, Final Four, and national championship games.
- Marv Albert/Steve Kerr/Craig Sager – Second and third round at Omaha, Nebraska; Midwest Regionals at St. Louis, Missouri
- Verne Lundquist/Bill Raftery/Lesley Visser – Second and third round at Louisville, Kentucky; East Regionals at Boston, Massachusetts
- Kevin Harlan/Len Elmore/Reggie Miller/Marty Snider – Second and third round at Pittsburgh, Pennsylvania; West Regionals at Phoenix, Arizona
- Ian Eagle/Jim Spanarkel/Lewis Johnson – First Four at Dayton, Ohio; second and third round at Nashville, Tennessee
- Brian Anderson/Dan Bonner/Jenn Hildreth – Second and third round at Portland, Oregon
- Tim Brando/Mike Gminski/Otis Livingston – Second and third round at Columbus, Ohio
- Spero Dedes/Bob Wenzel/Jaime Maggio – Second and third round at Albuquerque, New Mexico

==== Number of games per network ====
- CBS: 26
- TBS: 16
- TruTV: 13
- TNT: 12

=== Radio ===
Dial Global Sports (formerly Westwood One) and SiriusXM have live broadcasts of all 67 games.

==== First Four ====
- Dave Ryan and Alaa Abdelnaby – at Dayton, Ohio

==== Second and third round ====
- Kevin Calabro and Bill Frieder – Second and third round at Portland, Oregon
- Dave Sims and Michael Cage – Second and third round at Albuquerque, New Mexico
- Scott Graham and Kevin Grevey – Second and third round at Pittsburgh, Pennsylvania
- Ted Robinson and Kyle Macy – Second and third round at Louisville, Kentucky
- Wayne Larrivee and John Thompson – Second and third round at Columbus, Ohio
- Kevin Kugler and Tom Brennan – Second and third round at Omaha, Nebraska
- Brad Sham and Pete Gillen – Second and third round at Nashville, Tennessee
- Gary Cohen and Reid Gettys – Second and third round at Greensboro, North Carolina

==== Regionals ====
- Kevin Kugler and Pete Gillen – East Regional at Boston, Massachusetts
- Wayne Larrivee and Fran Fraschilla – Midwest Regional at St. Louis, Missouri
- Ian Eagle and John Thompson – South Regional at Atlanta, Georgia
- Dave Sims and Bill Frieder – West Regional at Phoenix, Arizona

==== Final Four ====
- Kevin Kugler, John Thompson and Bill Raftery – New Orleans, Louisiana

== Courts ==
All tournament sites continued to use the uniform courts that were first introduced tournament-wide in 2010, except for a slight variation at the East Regionals in Boston at the TD Garden, where a parquet floor court pattern similar to that used by the hometown Boston Celtics was used.

== See also ==
- 2012 NCAA Division II men's basketball tournament
- 2012 NCAA Division III men's basketball tournament
- 2012 NCAA Division I women's basketball tournament
- 2012 NCAA Division II women's basketball tournament
- 2012 NCAA Division III women's basketball tournament
- 2012 National Invitation Tournament
- 2012 Women's National Invitation Tournament
- 2012 NAIA Division I men's basketball tournament
- 2012 NAIA Division II men's basketball tournament
- 2012 NAIA Division I women's basketball tournament
- 2012 NAIA Division II women's basketball tournament
- 2012 College Basketball Invitational
- 2012 CollegeInsider.com Postseason Tournament
