= 2011–12 Louisville Cardinals men's basketball team =

American college basketball season

2011–12 Louisville Cardinals men's basketball

Big East tournament champions (vacated)

NCAA tournament, Final Four (vacated)
- Conference: Big East Conference

Ranking
- Coaches: No. 4
- AP: No. 17
- Record: 0–9 (30 wins, 1 loss vacated) (0–8 Big East, 10 wins vacated)
- Head coach: Rick Pitino (11th season)
- Associate head coach: Richard Pitino (1st season)
- Assistant coaches: Wyking Jones; Kevin Keatts
- Home arena: KFC Yum! Center

2011–12 Big East men's basketball standings
	Conf.				Overall
Team	W		L	PCT	W		L	PCT
No. 11 Marquette	14	–	4	.778	27	–	8	.771
Notre Dame	13	–	5	.722	22	–	12	.647
Cincinnati	12	–	6	.667	26	–	11	.703
No. 15 Georgetown	12	–	6	.667	24	–	9	.727
South Florida	12	–	6	.667	22	–	14	.611
West Virginia	9	–	9	.500	19	–	14	.576
Connecticut	8	–	10	.444	20	–	14	.588
Seton Hall	8	–	10	.444	21	–	13	.618
Rutgers	6	–	12	.333	14	–	18	.438
St. John's	6	–	12	.333	13	–	19	.406
Pittsburgh	5	–	13	.278	22	–	17	.564
Villanova	5	–	13	.278	13	–	19	.406
Providence	4	–	14	.222	15	–	17	.469
DePaul	3	–	15	.167	12	–	19	.387
*No. 2 Syracuse	0	–	1	.000	0	–	3	.000
**No. 17 Louisville†	0	–	8	.000	0	–	10	.000
† 2012 Big East tournament winner As of March 31, 2012; *Syracuse: 30 reg. season games, 4 postseason games vacated due to sanctions against the program; Disputed record: Syracuse–(34–3)(17–1) **Louisville: 25 reg. season games, 5 postseason games vacated due to sanctions against the program; Disputed record: Louisville–(30-10)(10-8); Rankings from AP Poll

The 2011–12 Louisville Cardinals men's basketball team represented the University of Louisville during the 2011–12 NCAA Division I men's basketball season, Louisville's 98th season of intercollegiate competition. The Cardinals competed in the Big East Conference and were coached by Rick Pitino, who was in his 11th season. The team played their home games on Denny Crum Court at the KFC Yum! Center. The Cardinals finished the season with a record of 30–10, 10–8 to finish in sixth place in Big East play. They defeated Seton Hall, Marquette, and Notre Dame to advance to the Big East tournament championship. In the championship game, they defeated Cincinnati to win the tournament for the second time. As a result of the win, the Cardinals received the conference's automatic bid to the NCAA tournament as the No. 4 seed in the West region. Louisville defeated Davidson and New Mexico to advance to the Sweet Sixteen. There they defeated No. 1-seeded Michigan State and Florida to advance to the Final Four for the ninth time in school history. In the Final Four, they lost to the eventual National Champion Kentucky.

On February 20, 2018, the NCAA announced that the wins and records for the season and Louisville's 2012–13, 2013–14, and 2014–15 seasons were vacated due to the sex scandal at Louisville.

== Previous season ==
The Cardinals finished the 2010–11 season with a record 25–10, 12–6 to finish in a tie for third place in Big East play. They received an at-large bid to the NCAA tournament where they were upset in the second round (round of 64) by Morehead State.

== Preseason ==
=== Departures ===
Name	Number	Pos.	Height	Weight	Year	Hometown	Notes
George Goode	0	C	6'8"	205	Senior	Raytown, Missouri	Graduated
Terrence Jennings	23	C	6'10"	240	Junior	Sacramento, California	Entered the 2011 NBA draft
Preston Knowles	2	G	6'1"	170	Senior	Winchester, Kentucky	Graduated

=== 2011 recruiting class ===
College recruiting information
Name	Hometown	School	Height	Weight	Commit date
Chane Behanan; PF	Cincinnati, OH	Bowling Green High School (KY)	6 ft 7 in (2.01 m)	240 lb (110 kg)	Jul 9, 2010
Chane Behanan; PF	Recruit ratings: Scout: Rivals: (96)				
Wayne Blackshear; SG	Chicago, IL	Morgan Park High School (IL)	6 ft 5 in (1.96 m)	205 lb (93 kg)	Dec 25, 2009
Wayne Blackshear; SG	Recruit ratings: Scout: Rivals: (96)				
Angel Nunez; SF	Washington Heights, Manhattan	Notre Dame Preparatory School (MA)	6 ft 7 in (2.01 m)	190 lb (86 kg)	Sep 30, 2010
Angel Nunez; SF	Recruit ratings: Scout: Rivals: (91)				
Zach Price; C	Louisville, KY	Jeffersontown High School (KY)	6 ft 10 in (2.08 m)	230 lb (100 kg)	Sep 8, 2009
Zach Price; C	Recruit ratings: Scout: Rivals: (95)				
Kevin Ware; SG	Conyers, Georgia	Rockdale County High School (GA)	6 ft 4 in (1.93 m)	167 lb (76 kg)	May 31, 2011
Kevin Ware; SG	Recruit ratings: Scout: Rivals: (92)				
Overall recruit ranking: Scout: 7 Rivals: 9 ESPN: 5
Note: In many cases, Scout, Rivals, 247Sports, On3, and ESPN may conflict in their listings of height and weight.; In these cases, the average was taken. ESPN grades are on a 100-point scale.; Sources: "Louisville Basketball Commitment List". Rivals.; "2011 Louisville Basketball Commitment List". Scout.; "ESPN". ESPN.; "Scout.com Team Recruiting Rankings". Scout.; "2011 Team Ranking". Rivals.

== Roster ==
2011–12 Louisville Cardinals men's basketball team
Players
Coaches

Pos.	#	Name	Height	Weight	Year	Previous school	Hometown
F	1	Angel Nunez	6 ft 7 in (2.01 m)	190 lb (86 kg)	Fr	Notre Dame Prep (Fitchburg, MA)	Washington Heights, New York
G	2	Russ Smith	6 ft 0 in (1.83 m)	160 lb (73 kg)	So	South Kent School (South Kent, CT)	Briarwood, New York
G	3	Peyton Siva	5 ft 10 in (1.78 m)	170 lb (77 kg)	Jr	Franklin	Seattle, Washington
F	4	Rakeem Buckles (injured)	6 ft 8 in (2.03 m)	200 lb (91 kg)	Jr	Monsignor Pace	Miami, Florida
G	5	Chris Smith (W)	6 ft 3 in (1.91 m)	200 lb (91 kg)	RS Sr	St. Benedict's Prep; Manhattan	Millstone, New Jersey
C	10	Gorgui Dieng	6 ft 10 in (2.08 m)	230 lb (104 kg)	So	Huntington Prep (Huntington, WV)	Kebemer, Senegal
C	12	Zach Price	6 ft 10 in (2.08 m)	235 lb (107 kg)	Fr	Jeffersontown	Louisville, Kentucky
G	14	Kyle Kuric (W)	6 ft 4 in (1.93 m)	185 lb (84 kg)	Sr	Memorial	Evansville, Indiana
G	15	Tim Henderson	6 ft 2 in (1.88 m)	180 lb (82 kg)	So	Christian Academy	Louisville, Kentucky
F	21	Jared Swopshire	6 ft 7 in (2.01 m)	215 lb (98 kg)	RS Jr	IMG Academy (Bradenton, FL)	St. Louis, Missouri
G	22	Elisha Justice (W)	5 ft 11 in (1.8 m)	170 lb (77 kg)	So	Shelby Valley	Dorton, Kentucky
G	23	Kevin Ware	6 ft 4 in (1.93 m)	185 lb (84 kg)	Fr	Rockdale County	Conyers, Georgia
F	24	Chane Behanan	6 ft 6 in (1.98 m)	245 lb (111 kg)	Fr	Bowling Green (Bowling Green, KY)	Cincinnati, Ohio
G	25	Wayne Blackshear	6 ft 5 in (1.96 m)	225 lb (102 kg)	Fr	Morgan Park	Chicago, Illinois
G	33	Mike Marra (injured)	6 ft 4 in (1.93 m)	190 lb (86 kg)	Jr	Northfield Mount Hermon (Mount Hermon, MA)	Esmond, Rhode Island
F	44	Stephen Van Treese (injured)	6 ft 8 in (2.03 m)	220 lb (100 kg)	Jr	Lawrence North	Indianapolis, Indiana

Head coach

- Rick Pitino (UMass)

Assistant coach(es)

- Richard Pitino (Providence)
- Wyking Jones (Loyola Marymount)
- Kevin Keatts (Ferrum)

Legend

- (C) Team captain
- (S) Suspended
- (I) Ineligible
- (W) Walk-on
- Injured
- Current redshirt

== Schedule and results ==
Date time, TV	Rank^{#}	Opponent^{#}	Result	Record	High points	High rebounds	High assists	Site (attendance) city, state
Exhibition
October 26, 2011*; 7:00 p.m., BEN/WHAS	No. 9	Pikeville	W 74–55	–	16 – Behanan	15 – Dieng	5 – Siva	KFC Yum! Center (18,866); Louisville, KY
November 3, 2011*; 7:00 p.m., BEN/WHAS	No. 9	Bellarmine	W 62–54	–	14 – Behanan/Swopshire	9 – Behanan	3 – C. Smith/Justice	KFC Yum! Center (19,911); Louisville, KY
Regular Season
November 11, 2011*; 7:00 p.m., BEN/WHAS	No. 9	Tennessee-Martin; Global Sports Invitational	W 83–48	1–0	14 – Behanan/Kuric	12 – Behanan	9 – Siva	KFC Yum! Center (20,485); Louisville, KY
November 13, 2011*; 4:00 p.m., BEN/WHAS	No. 9	Lamar; Global Sports Invitational	W 68–48	2–0	13 – Swopshire	13 – Behanan	3 – Siva/Kuric	KFC Yum! Center (19,842); Louisville, KY
November 19, 2011*; 2:00 p.m., ESPN3	No. 8	at Butler	W 69–53	3–0	17 – Kuric	7 – Behanan	3 – Kuric	Hinkle Fieldhouse (9,071); Indianapolis, IN
November 22, 2011*; 7:00 p.m., BEN/WHAS	No. 7	Arkansas State; Global Sports Invitational	W 54–27	4–0	12 – Kuric	7 – Dieng/Swopshire	7 – C. Smith	KFC Yum! Center (20,323); Louisville, KY
November 25, 2011*; 7:00 p.m., BEN/WHAS	No. 7	Ohio; Global Sports Invitational	W 59–54	5–0	16 – Kuric	16 – Dieng	6 – Siva	KFC Yum! Center (21,334); Louisville, KY
November 28, 2011*; 7:00 p.m., ESPNU	No. 6	Long Beach State	W 79–66	6–0	18 – C. Smith	7 – Dieng	5 – Siva	KFC Yum! Center (20,468); Louisville, KY
December 2, 2011*; 8:30 p.m., ESPN	No. 6	No. 19 Vanderbilt; 2011 SEC–Big East Invitational	W 62–60 ^{OT}	7–0	15 – Kuric	10 – Behanan	5 – Siva	KFC Yum! Center (22,728); Louisville, KY
December 7, 2011*; 7:00 p.m., BEN/WHAS	No. 5	IUPUI	W 90–60	8–0	19 – C. Smith	12 – Dieng	8 – Siva	KFC Yum! Center (20,604); Louisville, KY
December 10, 2011*; 4:00 p.m., BEN/WHAS	No. 5	Fairleigh Dickinson	W 80–58	9–0	18 – Kuric	12 – Dieng	9 – Siva	KFC Yum! Center (20,264); Louisville, KY
December 17, 2011*; 4:00 p.m., CBS	No. 4	Memphis; Basketball Hall of Fame Shootout	W 95–87	10–0	24 – R. Smith	14 – Dieng	9 – Siva	KFC Yum! Center (22,733); Louisville, KY
December 20, 2011*; 9:00 p.m., ESPNU	No. 4	College of Charleston	W 69–62	11–0	17 – Kuric	10 – Dieng	6 – Siva	KFC Yum! Center (20,750); Louisville, KY
December 23, 2011*; 7:00 p.m., ESPN2	No. 4	WKU; Billy Minardi Classic	W 70–60	12–0	23 – R. Smith	15 – Dieng	4 – Siva	KFC Yum! Center (22,150); Louisville, KY
December 28, 2011; 7:00 p.m., ESPN2	No. 4	No. 12 Georgetown	L 68–71	12–1 (0–1)	17 – Kuric	11 – Benhanan/Dieng	6 – Siva	KFC Yum! Center (22,517); Louisville, KY
December 31, 2011*; 12:00 p.m., CBS	No. 4	at No. 3 Kentucky; Battle for the Bluegrass	L 62–69	12–2 (0–1)	30 – R. Smith	5 – Tied	4 – Siva	Rupp Arena (24,387); Lexington, KY
January 3, 2012; 7:00 p.m., ESPNU	No. 11	at St. John's	W 73–58	13–2 (1–1)	17 – R. Smith	9 – Dieng/Swopshire	7 – R. Smith	Madison Square Garden (9,258); New York, NY
January 7, 2011; 4:00 p.m., ESPNU	No. 11	Notre Dame	L 63–67 ^{2OT}	13–3 (1–2)	17 – Behanan/Kuric	10 – Behanan/Kuric	5 – Siva	KFC Yum! Center (22,687); Louisville, KY
January 10, 2012; 7:00 p.m., ESPN2	No. 14	at Providence	L 59–90	13–4 (1–3)	16 – C. Smith	9 – Kuric	4 – C. Smith	Dunkin' Donuts Center (8,163); Providence, RI
January 14, 2012; 7:00 p.m., BEN/WHAS	No. 14	DePaul	W 76–59	14–4 (2–3)	25 – R. Smith	12 – Dieng	6 – Siva/R. Smith	KFC Yum! Center (21,223); Louisville, KY
January 16, 2012; 3:30 p.m., ESPN	No. 23	at No. 21 Marquette	L 63–74	14–5 (2–4)	10 – R. Smith	12 – C. Behanan	8 – P. Siva	Bradley Center (16,688); Milwaukee, WI
January 21, 2012; 9:00 p.m., ESPN	No. 23	at Pittsburgh; ESPN College GameDay	W 73–62	15–5 (3–4)	21 – Kuric	14 – Deing	7 – Siva	Petersen Events Center (12,508); Pittsburgh, PA
January 25, 2012; 7:00 p.m., ESPN		Villanova	W 84–74	16–5 (4–4)	16 – Siva	13 – Dieng	5 – Siva/R. Smith	KFC Yum! Center (21,219); Louisville, KY
January 28, 2011; 8:00 p.m., BEN/WHAS		at Seton Hall	W 60–51	17–5 (5–4)	14 – R. Smith	14 – Dieng	4 – Siva	Prudential Center (9,573); Newark, NJ
February 4, 2012; 4:00 p.m., BEN/WHAS		Rutgers	W 78–66	18–5 (6–4)	23 – Behanan	13 – C. Smith	6 – C. Smith	KFC Yum! Center (21,298); Louisville, KY
February 6, 2012; 7:00 p.m., ESPN	No. 24	Connecticut; Big Monday	W 80–59	19–5 (7–4)	16 – C. Smith	12 – Behanan	9 – P. Siva	KFC Yum! Center (21,804); Louisville, KY
February 11, 2012; 12:00 p.m., ESPN	No. 24	at West Virginia	W 77–74	20–5 (8–4)	17 – Kuric	6 – Behanan/Dieng	5 – Siva	WVU Coliseum (11,254); Morgantown, WV
February 13, 2012; 7:00 p.m., ESPN	No. 19	No. 2 Syracuse; Big Monday	L 51–52	20–6 (8–5)	16 – Behanan	10 – Dieng	4 – Siva	KFC Yum! Center (22,738); Louisville, KY
February 18, 2012; 12:00 p.m., BEN/WHAS	No. 19	at DePaul	W 90–82 ^{OT}	21–6 (9–5)	25 – Kuric	9 – Dieng	6 – Siva	Allstate Arena (13,674); Rosemont, Illinois
February 23, 2012; 9:00 p.m., ESPNU	No. 17	at Cincinnati	L 56–60	21–7 (9–6)	14 – Siva	13 – Dieng	4 – Siva	Fifth Third Arena (13,176); Cincinnati, OH
February 26, 2012; 2:00 p.m., CBS	No. 17	Pittsburgh	W 57–54	22–7 (10–6)	18 – R. Smith	5 – Dieng/Siva	5 – Siva	KFC Yum! Center (22,746); Louisville, KY
February 29, 2012; 7:00 p.m., BEN/WHAS	No. 19	South Florida; Senior Night	L 51–58	22–8 (10–7)	14 – Kuric/C. Smith	7 – Behanan	3 – Siva	KFC Yum! Center (22,114); Louisville, KY
March 3, 2012; 4:00 p.m., CBS	No. 19	at No. 2 Syracuse	L 49–58	22–9 (10–8)	10 – Behanan/R. Smith	12 – Dieng	4 – Siva	Carrier Dome (33,205); Syracuse, NY
Big East tournament
March 7, 2012; 7:00 p.m., ESPN	(7)	vs. (10) Seton Hall; Second Round	W 61–55	23–9	14 – Siva	10 – Dieng	3 – Siva	Madison Square Garden (20,057); New York, NY
March 8, 2012; 7:00 p.m., ESPN	(7)	vs. (2) No. 9 Marquette; Quarter Final	W 84–71	24–9	20 – Kuric	12 – Swopshire	6 – Siva	Madison Square Garden (20,057); New York, NY
March 9, 2012; 9:00 p.m., ESPN	(7)	vs. (3) No. 23 Notre Dame; Semi Final	W 64–50	25–9	16 – Dieng	6 – Dieng	9 – Siva	Madison Square Garden (20,057); New York, NY
March 10, 2012; 7:00 p.m., ESPN	(7)	vs. (4) Cincinnati; Final	W 50–44	26–9	15 – C. Smith	10 – Dieng	5 – Siva	Madison Square Garden (20,057); New York, NY
NCAA tournament
March 15, 2012*; 1:40 p.m., TBS	(4 W) No. 17	vs. (13 W) Davidson; Second Round	W 69–62	27–9	17 – Siva	11 – Behanan	6 – Siva	Rose Garden Arena (17,519); Portland, Oregon
March 17, 2012*; 9:52 p.m., TBS	(4 W) No. 17	vs. (5 W) No. 21 New Mexico; Third Round	W 59–56	28–9	17 – R. Smith	10 – Deng	5 – Siva	Rose Garden Arena (17,519); Portland, Oregon
March 22, 2012*; 7:47 p.m., TBS	(4 W) No. 17	vs. (1 W) No. 5 Michigan State; Sweet Sixteen	W 57–44	29–9	15 – Behanan	9 – Behanan/Dieng	9 – Siva	US Airways Center (14,913); Phoenix, Arizona
March 24, 2012*; 4:33 p.m., CBS	(4 W) No. 17	vs. (7 W) No. 25 Florida; Elite Eight	W 72–68	30–9	19 – Smith	7 – Behanan	8 – Siva	US Airways Center (13,456); Phoenix, Arizona
March 31, 2012*; 6:09 p.m., CBS	(4 W) No. 17	vs. (1 S) No. 1 Kentucky; Final Four	L 61–69	30–10	11 – Siva	12 – Dieng	3 – Siva	Mercedes-Benz Superdome (73,361); New Orleans, LA
*Non-conference game. ^{#}Rankings from AP Poll. (#) Tournament seedings in parentheses. All times are in Eastern Time (#) during NCAA Tournament is seed with Region.

== Awards ==
=== Big East All-Tournament Team ===
- Gorgui Dieng
- Kyle Kuric
- Peyton Siva

=== Big East tournament Most Outstanding Player ===
- Peyton Siva

=== NCAA (West) Regional All-Tournament Team ===
- Chane Behanan
- Gorgui Dieng
- Peyton Siva

=== NCAA (West) Regional Most Outstanding Player ===
- Chane Behanan

== Rankings ==
Ranking movement Legend: ██ Increase in ranking. ██ Decrease in ranking. ██ Not ranked the previous week.
Poll	Pre	Wk 1	Wk 2	Wk 3	Wk 4	Wk 5	Wk 6	Wk 7	Wk 8	Wk 9	Wk 10	Wk 11	Wk 12	Wk 13	Wk 14	Wk 15	Wk 16	Wk 17	Wk 18	Final
AP	9	8	7	6	5	4	4	4	11	14	23	–	–	24	19	17	19	–	17	
Coaches	8	7	7	6	4	4	4	4	10	15	21	25	25	23	18	17	18	–	17	4
