= 2011–12 Cincinnati Bearcats men's basketball team =

American college basketball season

2011–12 Cincinnati Bearcats men's basketball

NCAA tournament, Sweet Sixteen
- Conference: Big East Conference (1979–2013)

Ranking
- Coaches: No. 18
- Record: 26–11 (12–6 Big East)
- Head coach: Mick Cronin (6th season)
- Assistant coaches: Larry Davis (6th season); George Jackson (3rd season); Darren Savino (2nd season)
- Home arena: Fifth Third Arena

2011–12 Big East men's basketball standings
	Conf.				Overall
Team	W		L	PCT	W		L	PCT
No. 11 Marquette	14	–	4	.778	27	–	8	.771
Notre Dame	13	–	5	.722	22	–	12	.647
Cincinnati	12	–	6	.667	26	–	11	.703
No. 15 Georgetown	12	–	6	.667	24	–	9	.727
South Florida	12	–	6	.667	22	–	14	.611
West Virginia	9	–	9	.500	19	–	14	.576
Connecticut	8	–	10	.444	20	–	14	.588
Seton Hall	8	–	10	.444	21	–	13	.618
Rutgers	6	–	12	.333	14	–	18	.438
St. John's	6	–	12	.333	13	–	19	.406
Pittsburgh	5	–	13	.278	22	–	17	.564
Villanova	5	–	13	.278	13	–	19	.406
Providence	4	–	14	.222	15	–	17	.469
DePaul	3	–	15	.167	12	–	19	.387
*No. 2 Syracuse	0	–	1	.000	0	–	3	.000
**No. 17 Louisville†	0	–	8	.000	0	–	10	.000
† 2012 Big East tournament winner As of March 31, 2012; *Syracuse: 30 reg. season games, 4 postseason games vacated due to sanctions against the program; Disputed record: Syracuse–(34–3)(17–1) **Louisville: 25 reg. season games, 5 postseason games vacated due to sanctions against the program; Disputed record: Louisville–(30-10)(10-8); Rankings from AP Poll

The 2011–12 Cincinnati Bearcats men's basketball team represented the University of Cincinnati during the 2011–12 NCAA Division I men's basketball season. The team played its home games in Cincinnati, Ohio at the Fifth Third Arena, which has a capacity of 13,176. They were members of the Big East Conference.

== Offseason ==
=== Departing players ===
Name	Number	Pos.	Height	Weight	Year	Hometown	Notes
Eddie Tyree	2	G	5'10"	180	Senior	Columbus, Ohio	Walk-on; graduated
Larry Davis	11	G	6'3"	185	Senior	Houston, Texas	Graduated
Darnell Wilks	15	F	6'7"	205	Senior	Nashville, Tennessee	Graduated
Rashad Bishop	22	F	6'6"	220	Senior	Paterson, New Jersey	Graduated
Anthony McBride	25	G	6'2"	180	RS Freshman	Cincinnati, Ohio	Walk-on; did not return
Anthony McClain	30	F	7'0"	290	Senior	Trenton, New Jersey	Graduated
Ibrahima Thomas	32	F	6'11"	235	Senior	Dakar, Senegal	Graduated

=== Incoming transfers ===
Name	Pos.	Height	Weight	Year	Hometown	Notes
Cheikh Mbodj	F	6'10"	227	Junior	Dakar, Senegal	Junior college transferred from Grayson College

=== Recruiting class of 2011 ===
College recruiting information
Name	Hometown	School	Height	Weight	Commit date
Ge'Lawn Guyn; SG	Lexington, KY	South Kent Prep	6 ft 3 in (1.91 m)	180 lb (82 kg)	Jul 1, 2010
Ge'Lawn Guyn; SG	Recruit ratings: Scout: Rivals: 247Sports: (91)				
Shaq Thomas; SF	Paterson, NJ	NIA Prep	6 ft 7 in (2.01 m)	180 lb (82 kg)	Sep 10, 2010
Shaq Thomas; SF	Recruit ratings: Scout: Rivals: 247Sports: (92)				
Jermaine Sanders; SF	New York, NY	Rice High School	6 ft 4 in (1.93 m)	205 lb (93 kg)	Sep 27, 2010
Jermaine Sanders; SF	Recruit ratings: Scout: Rivals: 247Sports: (91)				
Jeremiah Davis III; SG	Muncie, IN	Huntington Prep	6 ft 2 in (1.88 m)	200 lb (91 kg)	Nov 13, 2010
Jeremiah Davis III; SG	Recruit ratings: Scout: Rivals: 247Sports: (90)				
Octavius Ellis; PF	Memphis, TN	Whitehaven High School	6 ft 8 in (2.03 m)	185 lb (84 kg)	
Octavius Ellis; PF	Recruit ratings: Scout: Rivals: 247Sports: (89)				
Overall recruit ranking: 247Sports: 26
Note: In many cases, Scout, Rivals, 247Sports, On3, and ESPN may conflict in their listings of height and weight.; In these cases, the average was taken. ESPN grades are on a 100-point scale.; Sources: "Cincinnati 2011 Player Commits". ESPN.; "2011 Team Ranking". Rivals.

== Roster ==
2011–12 Cincinnati Bearcats men's basketball team
Players
Coaches

Pos.	#	Name	Height	Weight	Year	Previous school	Hometown
G	0	Jeremiah Davis III	6 ft 3 in (1.91 m)	200 lb (91 kg)	Fr	Huntington Prep	Muncie, Indiana
G	1	Cashmere Wright	6 ft 0 in (1.83 m)	175 lb (79 kg)	RS Jr	Urban Christian Academy	Savannah, Georgia
F	2	Octavius Ellis	6 ft 9 in (2.06 m)	210 lb (95 kg)	Fr	Whitehaven High School	Memphis, Tennessee
G	3	Dion Dixon (C)	6 ft 3 in (1.91 m)	195 lb (88 kg)	Sr	Crane High School	Chicago, Illinois
F	5	Justin Jackson	6 ft 8 in (2.03 m)	210 lb (95 kg)	So	Arlington Country Day School	Cocoa Beach, Florida
G	10	Alex Eppensteiner (W)	6 ft 3 in (1.91 m)	210 lb (95 kg)	Jr	Elder High School	Cincinnati, Ohio
F	11	Shaquille Thomas (redshirt)	6 ft 7 in (2.01 m)	180 lb (82 kg)	Fr	NIA Prep	Paterson, New Jersey
C	13	Cheikh Mbodj	6 ft 10 in (2.08 m)	245 lb (111 kg)	Jr	Grayson College	Dakar, Senegal
G	14	Ge'Lawn Guyn	6 ft 1 in (1.85 m)	175 lb (79 kg)	Fr	South Kent Prep	Georgetown, Kentucky
F	15	Jermaine Sanders	6 ft 5 in (1.96 m)	225 lb (102 kg)	Fr	Rice High School	Far Rockaway, New York
G/F	23	Sean Kilpatrick	6 ft 4 in (1.93 m)	215 lb (98 kg)	RS So	Notre Dame Prep	White Plains, New York
F	24	Kelvin Gaines	6 ft 10 in (2.08 m)	225 lb (102 kg)	RS Fr	Arlington Country Day School	Ocala, Florida
F	34	Yancy Gates (C)	6 ft 9 in (2.06 m)	260 lb (118 kg)	Sr	Withrow High School	Cincinnati, Ohio
F	44	JaQuon Parker	6 ft 3 in (1.91 m)	210 lb (95 kg)	Jr	King's Fork High School	Suffolk, Virginia

Head coach

- Mick Cronin (Cincinnati)

Assistant coach(es)

- Larry Davis (Asbury)
- George Jackson (Wittenberg)
- Darren Savino (NJCU)

Legend

- (C) Team captain
- (S) Suspended
- (I) Ineligible
- (W) Walk-on
- Injured
- Current redshirt

Roster
Last update: 2 Sep 2020

=== Depth chart ===
Pos.	Starting 5	Bench 1	Bench 2
C	Yancy Gates	Cheikh Mbodj	Octavius Ellis
PF	JaQuon Parker	Justin Jackson	Kelvin Gaines
SF	Sean Kilpatrick	Jermaine Sanders
SG	Dion Dixon	Jeremiah Davis III	Alex Eppensteiner
PG	Cashmere Wright	Ge'Lawn Guyn

== Schedule and results ==
Date time, TV	Rank^{#}	Opponent^{#}	Result	Record	Site (attendance) city, state
Exhibition
November 1, 2011*; 7:00pm	No. 21	McGill	W 75–41	–	Fifth Third Arena (3,484); Cincinnati, OH
November 8, 2011*; 7:00pm	No. 21	Northern Kentucky	W 66–54	–	Fifth Third Arena (5,329); Cincinnati, OH
Non-conference regular season
November 13, 2011*; 7:00pm, FS Ohio	No. 21	Alabama State	W 65–40	1–0	Fifth Third Arena (4,264); Cincinnati, OH
November 15, 2011*; 7:00pm, FS Ohio	No. 20	Jacksonville State	W 79–63	2–0	Fifth Third Arena (4,152); Cincinnati, OH
November 19, 2011*; 4:00 pm	No. 20	Presbyterian	L 54–56	2–1	Fifth Third Arena (4,960); Cincinnati, OH
November 21, 2011*; 7:00pm, FS Ohio		Northwestern State	W 71–43	3–1	Fifth Third Arena (4,505); Cincinnati, OH
November 25, 2011*; 7:00pm, ESPN3		Marshall	L 69–73 ^{OT}	3–2	Fifth Third Arena (7,201); Cincinnati, OH
November 29, 2011*; 7:00pm, FS Ohio		Miami (OH)	W 56–47	4–2	Fifth Third Arena (6,457); Cincinnati, OH
December 2, 2011*; 7:00pm, ESPNU		at Georgia; SEC–Big East Challenge	W 57–51	5–2	Stegeman Coliseum (6,796); Athens, GA
December 10, 2011*; 12:30pm, ESPN2		at No. 8 Xavier; Crosstown Shootout	L 53–76	5–3	Cintas Center (10,250); Cincinnati, OH
December 14, 2011*; 7:00pm, ESPN2		at Wright State	W 78–58	6–3	Nutter Center (5,097); Dayton, OH
December 17, 2011*; 2:00pm, ESPN3		Radford	W 101–70	7–3	Fifth Third Arena (4,771); Cincinnati, OH
December 21, 2011*; 7:00pm, FS Ohio		Arkansas-Pine Bluff	W 101–53	8–3	Fifth Third Arena (4,874); Cincinnati, OH
December 23, 2011*; 7:00pm, FS Ohio		Chicago State	W 95–60	9–3	Fifth Third Arena (5,321); Cincinnati, OH
December 29, 2011*; 9:00pm, ESPNU		vs. Oklahoma	W 56–55	10–3	US Bank Arena (4,439); Cincinnati, OH
Big East Regular Season
January 1, 2012; 7:00pm, FS Ohio/BIG EAST Network		at No. 22 Pittsburgh	W 66–63	11–3 (1–0)	Petersen Events Center (12,508); Pittsburgh, PA
January 4, 2012; 7:00pm, FS Ohio/BIG EAST Network		Notre Dame	W 71–55	12–3 (2–0)	Fifth Third Arena (10,142); Cincinnati, OH
January 7, 2012; 2:00pm, FS Ohio/BIG EAST Network		St. John's	L 55–57	12–4 (2–1)	Fifth Third Arena (8,820); Cincinnati, OH
January 9, 2012; 9:00pm, ESPNU		at No. 11 Georgetown	W 68–64	13–4 (3–1)	Verizon Center (7,877); Washington, D.C.
January 14, 2012; 12:00pm, CinCW/BIG EAST Network		Villanova	W 82–78	14–4 (4–1)	Fifth Third Arena (10,205); Cincinnati, OH
January 18, 2012; 7:00pm, ESPN2		at No. 11 Connecticut	W 70–67	15–4 (5–1)	Harry A. Gampel Pavilion (10,167); Storrs, CT
January 21, 2012; 3:00pm, ESPNU		at West Virginia	L 74–77	15–5 (5–2)	WVU Coliseum (14,070); Morgantown, WV
January 23, 2012; 7:00pm, ESPN		No. 3 Syracuse; BIG MONDAY	L 53–60	15–6 (5–3)	Fifth Third Arena (13,176); Cincinnati, OH
January 28, 2012; 6:00pm, FS Ohio/BIG EAST Network		at Rutgers	L 54–61	15–7 (5–4)	The RAC (7,693); Piscataway, NJ
February 4, 2012; 7:00pm, FS Ohio/BIG EAST Network		DePaul	W 74–66	16–7 (6–4)	Fifth Third Arena (10,450); Cincinnati, OH
February 8, 2012; 7:00pm, ESPNU		at St. John's	W 76–54	17–7 (7–4)	Madison Square Garden (7,618); New York, NY
February 11, 2012; 3:00pm, ESPNU		at No. 18 Marquette	L 78–95	17–8 (7–5)	Bradley Center (18,815); Milwaukee, WI
February 15, 2012; 9:00pm, ESPNU		Providence	W 81–66	18–8 (8–5)	Fifth Third Arena (7,822); Cincinnati, OH
February 18, 2012; 4:00pm, FS Ohio/BIG EAST Network		Seton Hall	W 72–67	19–8 (9–5)	Fifth Third Arena (13,003); Cincinnati, OH
February 23, 2012; 9:00pm, ESPN		No. 17 Louisville; Rivalry	W 60–56	20–8 (10–5)	Fifth Third Arena (13,176); Cincinnati, OH
February 26, 2012; 12:00pm, CinCW/BIG EAST Network		at South Florida	L 45–46	20–9 (10–6)	Tampa Bay Times Forum (6,784); Tampa, FL
February 29, 2012; 7:00pm, ESPN2		No. 8 Marquette	W 72–61	21–9 (11–6)	Fifth Third Arena (11,316); Cincinnati, OH
March 3, 2012; 2:00pm, ESPN		at Villanova	W 72–68	22–9 (12–6)	The Pavilion (6,500); Villanova, PA
Big East tournament
March 8, 2012; 2:00pm, ESPN	(4)	vs. (5) No. 13 Georgetown; Quarterfinals	W 72–70 ^{2OT}	23–9	Madison Square Garden (20,057); New York, NY
March 9, 2012; 7:00pm, ESPN	(4)	vs. (1) No. 2 Syracuse; Semifinals	W 71–68	24–9	Madison Square Garden (20,057); New York, NY
March 10, 2012; 9:00pm, ESPN	(4)	vs. (7) Louisville; Championship/Rivalry	L 44–50	24–10	Madison Square Garden (20,057); New York, NY
NCAA tournament
March 16, 2012*; 12:15pm, CBS	(E 6)	vs. (E 11) Texas; Second Round	W 65–59	25–10	Bridgestone Arena; Nashville, TN
March 18, 2012*; 9:40pm, TBS	(E 6)	vs. (E 3) No. 10 Florida State; Third Round	W 62–56	26–10	Bridgestone Arena (11,033); Nashville, TN
March 22, 2012*; 9:45 p.m., CBS	(E 6)	vs. (E 2) No. 7 Ohio State; Sweet Sixteen	L 66–81	26–11	TD Garden (18,796); Boston, MA
*Non-conference game. ^{#}Rankings from AP Poll. (#) Tournament seedings in parentheses. All times are in Eastern Time. (#) during NCAA Tournament is seed with Region..

== Rankings ==
Ranking movements Legend: ██ Increase in ranking ██ Decrease in ranking — = Not ranked т = Tied with team above or below
	Week																			
Poll	Pre	1	2	3	4	5	6	7	8	9	10	11	12	13	14	15	16	17	18	Final
AP	21	20	—																	Not released
Coaches	22	20 т	—																	18

== Awards and milestones ==
=== Big East Conference honors ===
==== All-Big East Second Team ====
- Sean Kilpatrick

==== Player of the Week ====
- Week 7: Sean Kilpatrick
- Week 9: Dion Dixon

== See also ==
- 2011–12 Big East Conference men's basketball season
- 2011 Crosstown Shootout brawl
