= 2011 Crosstown Shootout brawl =

Cincinnati Bearcats at Xavier Musketeers
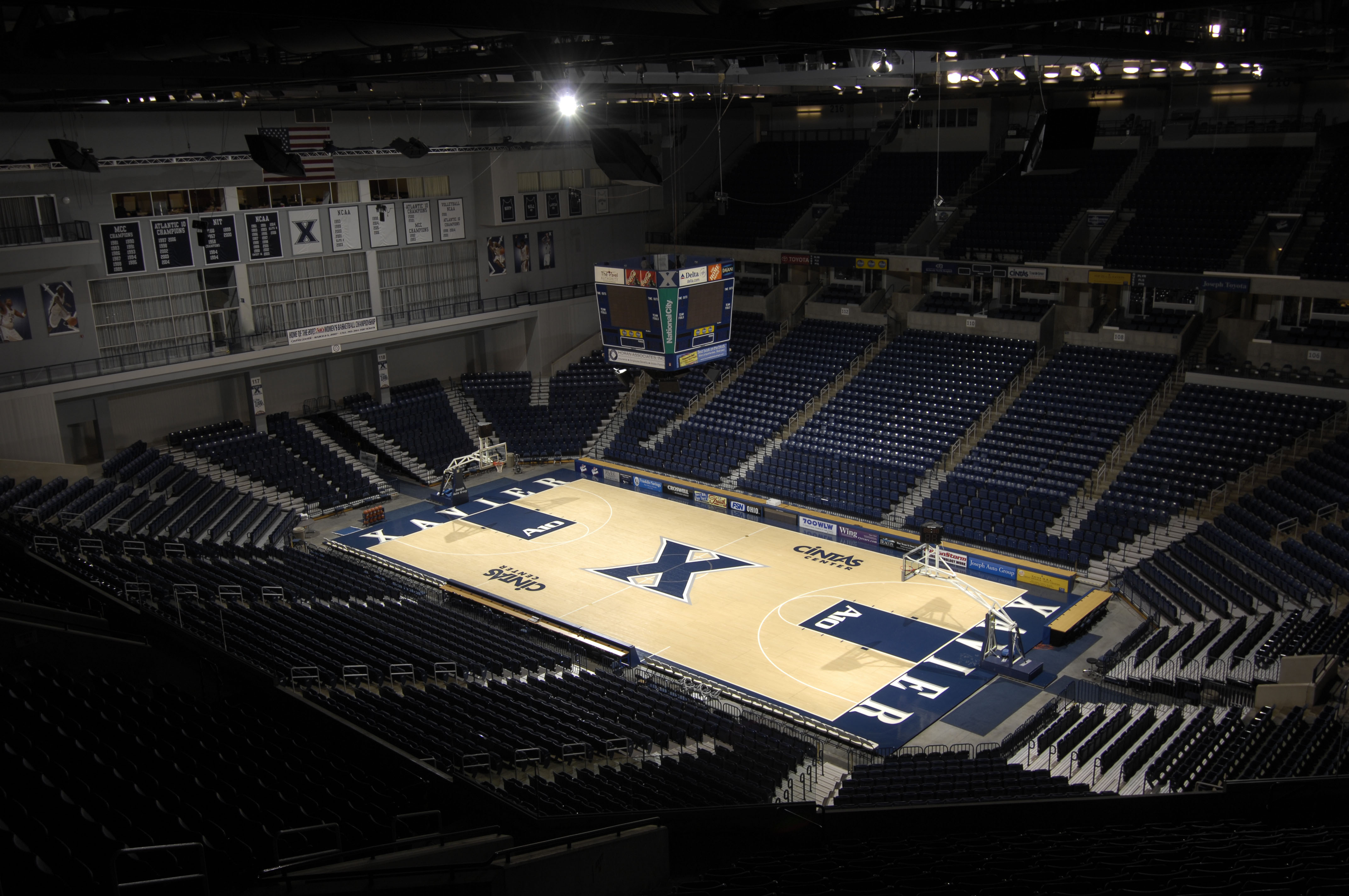
- Game called with 9.4 seconds left in the second half due to violent contact between players from both teams.
Cincinnati Bearcats	Xavier Musketeers
53	76
Head coach: Mick Cronin	Head coach: Chris Mack
	1st half	2nd half	Total
Cincinnati Bearcats	25	28	53
Xavier Musketeers	34	42	76
- Date: December 10, 2011
- Venue: Cintas Center, Cincinnati, Ohio, U.S.

United States TV coverage
- Network: ESPN2

The 2011 Crosstown Shootout brawl, nicknamed the Crosstown Punch-Out, was a bench-clearing brawl that took place at the end of the 2011 edition of the Crosstown Shootout college basketball game between the University of Cincinnati Bearcats and the Xavier University Musketeers. The game and brawl took place on December 10, 2011, at Xavier's home arena, the Cintas Center in Cincinnati, Ohio, United States.

== Background ==
The Crosstown Shootout is one of the most intense rivalries in college basketball, exacerbated by the fact that Xavier University and the University of Cincinnati are only two miles (3.2 km) apart. On December 8, UC guard Sean Kilpatrick told Andy Furman of WQRT that Xavier's All-American guard Tu Holloway probably wouldn't start for the Bearcats "with the players that we have now."

The series had developed a history of bad blood in the years leading up to the 2011 Crosstown Shootout. In 2008, a total of six technical fouls were called in a 76-66 Xavier win. Xavier's Derrick Brown was ejected, and two freshman post players were involved in an altercation that displayed the enmity between the two schools: Xavier's Kenny Frease headbutted UC's Yancy Gates. The following year, multiple verbal exchanges resulted in UC clearing their bench, as well as technicals called on Xavier's Jordan Crawford and UC's Rashad Bishop in Xavier's double overtime win. In 2010, Holloway received a technical foul for throwing an elbow late in UC's 66-46 win.

== The brawl ==
The 2011 Crosstown Shootout was close at first, with eight ties and six lead changes in the first half. Xavier led 34–25 at halftime. The first sign of trouble occurred in the closing seconds of the first half, when Bearcat backup Octavius Ellis began exchanging some words with Xavier player Mark Lyons from the bench. Ellis jumped up from the bench to confront Lyons, and the two players had to be separated. Before the start of the second half, according to Xavier coach Chris Mack, both teams were warned that any further incident would result in technical fouls. The Musketeers started the second half on a 9–2 run and were never seriously threatened afterward. Ultimately, the Musketeers outscored the Bearcats 42–28 in the second half.

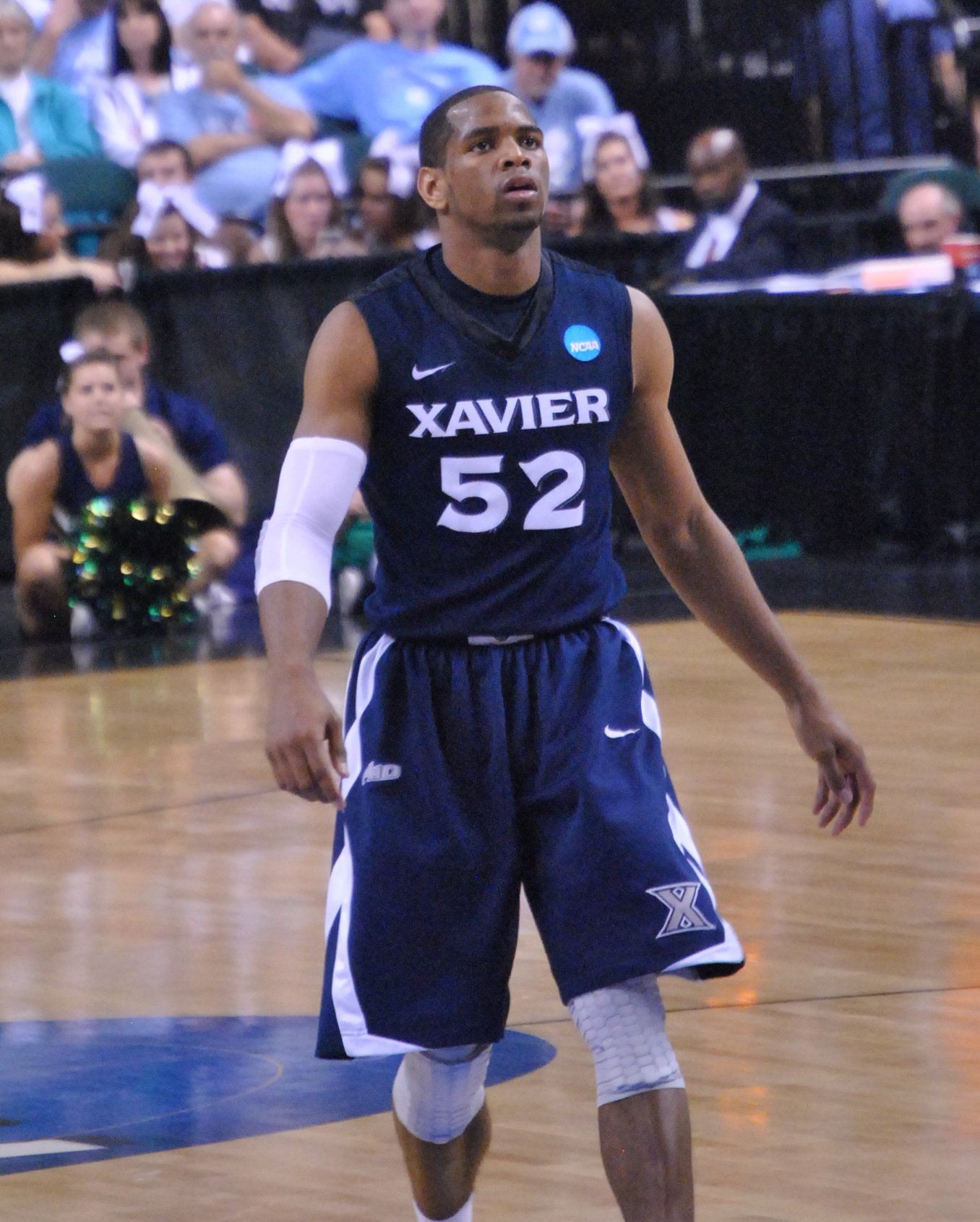
Tu Holloway

With 18.6 seconds remaining, Xavier's Tu Holloway scored a layup to give the Musketeers the 76–53 lead. As Holloway walked to the other end of the court, he began shouting at the Bearcat bench, bringing UC's Ge'Lawn Guyn over to confront him and triggering an argument between both men. As Guyn reached for Holloway's throat, Xavier's Dezmine Wells intervened by pushing Guyn to the floor, causing UC's Yancy Gates to throw the ball at Holloway's head and both benches to empty. In the ensuing fight, Gates punched Xavier's Kenny Frease in the face, opening up a large cut under Frease's left eye and knocking him to the ground. As Frease tried to crawl away from the crowd, UC's Cheikh Mbodj stomped on the back of his head. Ellis threw a punch at Lyons, causing him and Wells to throw several back before coaches got in between them. This brought Gates over, who began shouting and throwing more punches at a Xavier backup, until Xavier assistant Aaron Williams and Lyons calmed him down. Referees Michael Roberts, Jeff Anderson, and Tony Crisp ended the game with 9.4 seconds remaining, giving Xavier the 76–53 win. UC's Gates and Mbodj, and Xavier's Wells, were retroactively ejected from the game for fighting. Under National Collegiate Athletic Association (NCAA) rules, these players were suspended for their next game, a sanction that could not be appealed.

== Aftermath ==
UC coach Mick Cronin, furious at how his players behaved, ordered them to take off their jerseys in the locker room, to the point he physically stripped them off from some of the players himself in disgust. In his postgame comments, a visibly angry Cronin said that he told his players not to put them on again "until they have a full understanding of where they go to school and what the university stands for and how lucky they are to even be there, let alone have a scholarship." He also hinted that several players could face suspensions, and possibly dismissal from the team, saying that he was going to review the tape with school president Gregory H. Williams and athletic director Whit Babcock "and decide who's going to be on my team going forward." Cronin also appeared to blame the referees for not taking control of the situation sooner (threats of technicals after the first-half incident notwithstanding), saying that Xavier players were yelling at his bench for the whole game and even cursing at his coaches. Cronin said he tried to call a time-out before the brawl broke out so the players could go to their respective benches, but couldn't get the officials' attention.

In the postgame interview, Holloway claimed the Bearcats had "disrespected" his teammates in the run-up to the game. He also said, "We went out there and zipped them up at the end of the game." He also added that he and his teammates considered themselves "gangsters, not thugs, but tough guys on the court." Lyons added, "If somebody puts their hand in your face or tries to do something to you, where we're from, you're gonna do something back."

Later that night, Cronin spoke with ESPN's Andy Katz and reiterated that there would be additional suspensions coming. "Nobody is going to walk on our side," he said. He also said the brawl was the most embarrassing moment of his coaching career. Mack was somewhat more restrained in his remarks, saying he wasn't "in a position to be a decision maker," but that his players needed to learn "how to handle themselves and not let that happen again." Earlier, Mack had tweeted, "If my players say they've been taught to be tough their whole life, they mean ON THE FLOOR. Nothing else is condoned."

Both schools' presidents issued statements condemning the brawl. UC's Williams strongly supported Cronin's postgame remarks, saying that the brawl was "not what we expect of representatives of the University of Cincinnati" and that school officials would "act swiftly and firmly" to ensure it would never happen again. Xavier's Michael J. Graham called the brawl "unsportsmanlike" and apologized to Xavier's fans and "the entire Cincinnati community." The Big East Conference and the Atlantic 10 Conference, the home conferences for UC and Xavier, respectively at the time, also condemned the brawl and promised to hand down additional suspensions if they felt the schools hadn't acted harshly enough.

On December 11, both schools announced suspensions for the players involved. UC suspended Gates, Mbodj and Ellis for six games each, and Guyn for one game. Cronin said that the four players would still have to earn their way back onto the team even after they served out their suspensions. At the very least, Cronin said, they would have to sincerely apologize on camera and complete several other unspecified tasks. Xavier suspended Wells and Landen Amos for four games, Lyons for two and Holloway for one. Xavier athletic director Mike Bobinski also apologized for Holloway and Lyons' postgame remarks. Mack said that Holloway was suspended specifically for his postgame comments, and admitted that neither he nor Lyons should have appeared before the media.

On December 11, Mack, Holloway, Lyons and Xavier Athletic Director Mike Bobinski all apologized for what occurred. Mike Bobinski said, "It was an embarrassment. It was a disappointment at every level. We take full responsibility for the role that we played in those events and are resolved to whatever is necessary to see to it that it never happens again." Holloway also apologized for his postgame comments, saying, "Myself, I used the wrong choice of words. I represent Xavier University, my family and myself and I really apologize for what took place." The following day, an emotional Gates apologized for his actions, saying they were "not what my family is about." Guyn, Ellis and Mbodj also apologized.

Hamilton County prosecutor Joe Deters said he was considering filing criminal charges related to the brawl. Under Ohio law, Deters' office would handle the case if the charges rose to the level of felonies; Cincinnati city solicitor John Curp would prosecute if they are only misdemeanors. There is no known instance of criminal charges being filed as a result of a brawl at an NCAA game. Two days later, Deters announced he would not file charges, indicating that Gates and Frease had "reached out to each other privately" and that Frease was satisfied with a personal apology from Gates. On that same day, Bobinski used Mack's radio show to again apologize and take questions from fans concerning the incident.

On December 18, prior to Xavier's game against Oral Roberts, Mack took the floor again to apologize for the incident that had occurred in the previous game. Mack said, "We were all embarrassed by our behavior last weekend," and added, "It's extremely disappointing and in no way was a representation of what our university and our basketball program is all about."

Partly due to the incident, Xavier and UC officials decided to move the Crosstown Shootout to U.S. Bank Arena for at least the next two seasons and rename it the Crosstown Classic. Player and fan behavior was extensively reevaluated after the 2013 game, and was said to be a major factor in the decision to continue the series beyond the 2013–14 season. On May 12, 2014, the two schools announced a ten-year agreement to continue the series, alternating between campuses, and to revert the name of the series back to the Crosstown Shootout.

== See also ==
- Malice at the Palace
- Knicks–Nuggets brawl
- Sparks–Shock brawl
- Violence in sports
- List of violent spectator incidents in sports
- 2010 Acropolis Basketball Tournament brawl
- Philippines–Australia basketball brawl
