= Sparks–Shock brawl =

2008 basketball match incident in the United States

Los Angeles Sparks at Detroit Shock
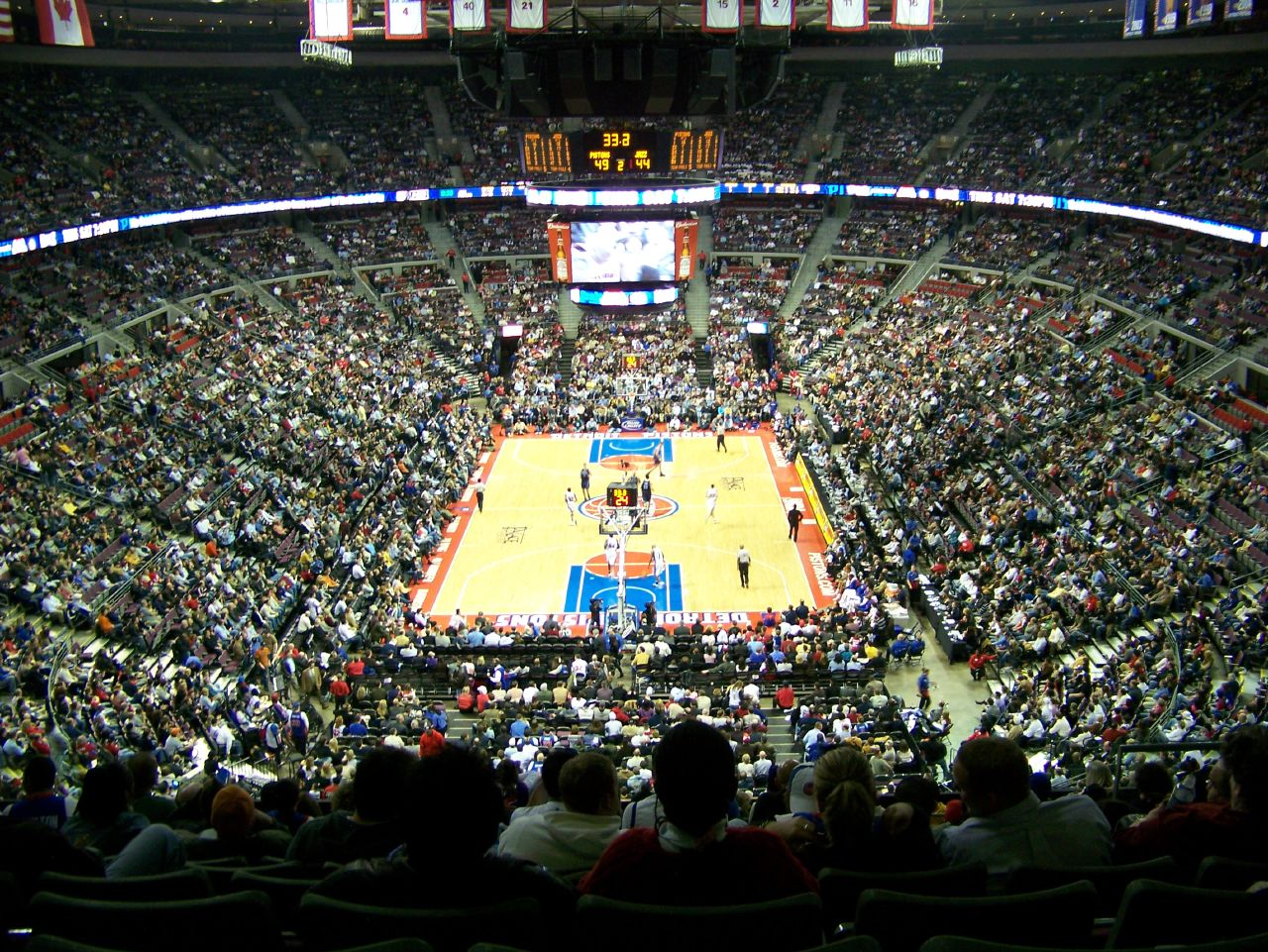
- The Palace of Auburn Hills, where the brawl took place
Los Angeles Sparks	Detroit Shock
84	81
	1	2	3	4	Total
Los Angeles Sparks	29	19	14	22	84
Detroit Shock	19	15	18	29	81
- Date: July 22, 2008
- Venue: The Palace of Auburn Hills, Auburn Hills, Michigan, U.S.
- Attendance: 12,930
- Network: ESPN2

The Sparks–Shock brawl was an altercation that occurred in a Women's National Basketball Association (WNBA) game between the Detroit Shock (now the Dallas Wings) and Los Angeles Sparks on July 22, 2008, at The Palace of Auburn Hills in Auburn Hills, Michigan, United States. Ray Ratto of The Wall Street Journal wrote, "It was in the classic sense, one of those things that occasionally happens when highly competitive people want the same thing and one can’t have it."

This was the second major basketball fight to occur at The Palace of Auburn Hills in four years, the other being the notorious Pacers–Pistons brawl, better known as the "Malice at the Palace", on November 19, 2004, resulting in this incident being referred to as the "Malice at The Palace II".

== Build-up ==
A couple of plays before the brawl broke out, Detroit Shock forward Cheryl Ford missed a free-throw, resulting in many players boxing out underneath the basket trying to grab the rebound. Los Angeles Sparks forward Candace Parker ended up with the ball after a hard contested rebound, before having the ball stripped away by Ford and being fouled. After the ball was taken from Parker's hands, she got upset and began to pursue Ford before teammate Lisa Leslie stepped in to intervene. Emotions were running high at this point, which would be a preview for the actual incident.

== Altercation ==
With 4.5 seconds before the game was officially over, the brawl began during a free throw attempt by the Sparks' Marie Ferdinand-Harris. As Ferdinand-Harris scored the point, the Shock's Plenette Pierson made a hard box-out on Parker, causing both players to become entangled and fall over. As Parker tried to stand up, Pierson aggressively walked into her, knocking her back down and resulting in Parker pulling Pierson down to the floor. Parker and Pierson both tried to throw a punch at one another before Parker was tackled by Deanna Nolan, as players and coaches from both teams quickly intervened. Detroit assistant coach Rick Mahorn came off the bench as a peacemaker, but inadvertently incited more violence when he knocked Leslie backwards to the floor. Leslie's teammate DeLisha Milton-Jones pushed and punched Mahorn in the back in retaliation, causing the Sparks' Shannon Bobbitt and Murriel Page to both come off the bench and shove Mahorn from behind as well. Pierson, Parker, Milton-Jones, and Mahorn were all ejected from the game. The altercation also aggravated a season-ending ACL injury to Shock player Cheryl Ford (sustained earlier with 2:06 left in the quarter), as she was trying to restrain Pierson, and had to be taken from the court in a wheelchair.

== Suspensions ==
Player	Suspension length	Reason
Plenette Pierson, Shock	4 games	Initiated altercation
Rick Mahorn, Asst. Coach - Shock	2 games	Escalated altercation
Shannon Bobbitt, Sparks	2 games	Left the bench, threw a punch
Murriel Page, Sparks	2 games	Left the bench, threw a punch
Candace Parker, Sparks	1 game	Threw a punch
DeLisha Milton-Jones, Sparks	1 game	Threw a punch
Lisa Leslie, Sparks	1 game	Threw a punch
Sheri Sam, Shock	1 game	Left the bench
Elaine Powell, Shock	1 game	Left the bench
Tasha Humphrey, Shock	1 game	Left the bench
Kara Braxton, Shock	1 game	Left the bench

According to WNBA rules:

- Any player not on the floor who leaves the bench area during the altercation receives a one-game suspension.
- Any player who attempts to throw a punch (successful or not) receives a one-game suspension.

Because they were ejected after the altercation, Parker, Milton-Jones, Mahorn, and Pierson all started serving their suspensions the immediate next game. Also according to WNBA rules, each team must have at least eight active members to play a game. Therefore, suspensions were staggered by alphabetical order of last name. To have eight on the Sparks' roster, Page was allowed to play in the immediate next game and served her suspension starting with the second game after the altercation. Because she was not active, Powell served her suspension when she was taken off the inactive list.

== Aftermath ==
With the suspensions and the injury to Ford, the Shock were down to seven players for their next game two days later against the Houston Comets. As a result, the team signed 50-year old Hall of Famer Nancy Lieberman to a seven-day contract. Against the Comets, she played nine minutes, handing out two assists, and broke her own record as the oldest player to ever play in a WNBA game.

== See also ==
- Violence in sports
- List of violent spectator incidents in sports
- Malice at the Palace
- Knicks–Nuggets brawl
- 2010 Acropolis Basketball Tournament brawl
- 2011 Crosstown Shootout brawl
- Philippines–Australia basketball brawl
