= Philippines–Australia basketball brawl =

Brawl between players of the Philippine and Australian men's national basketball teams

Philippines vs. Australia 2019 FIBA Basketball World Cup qualification (Asia)
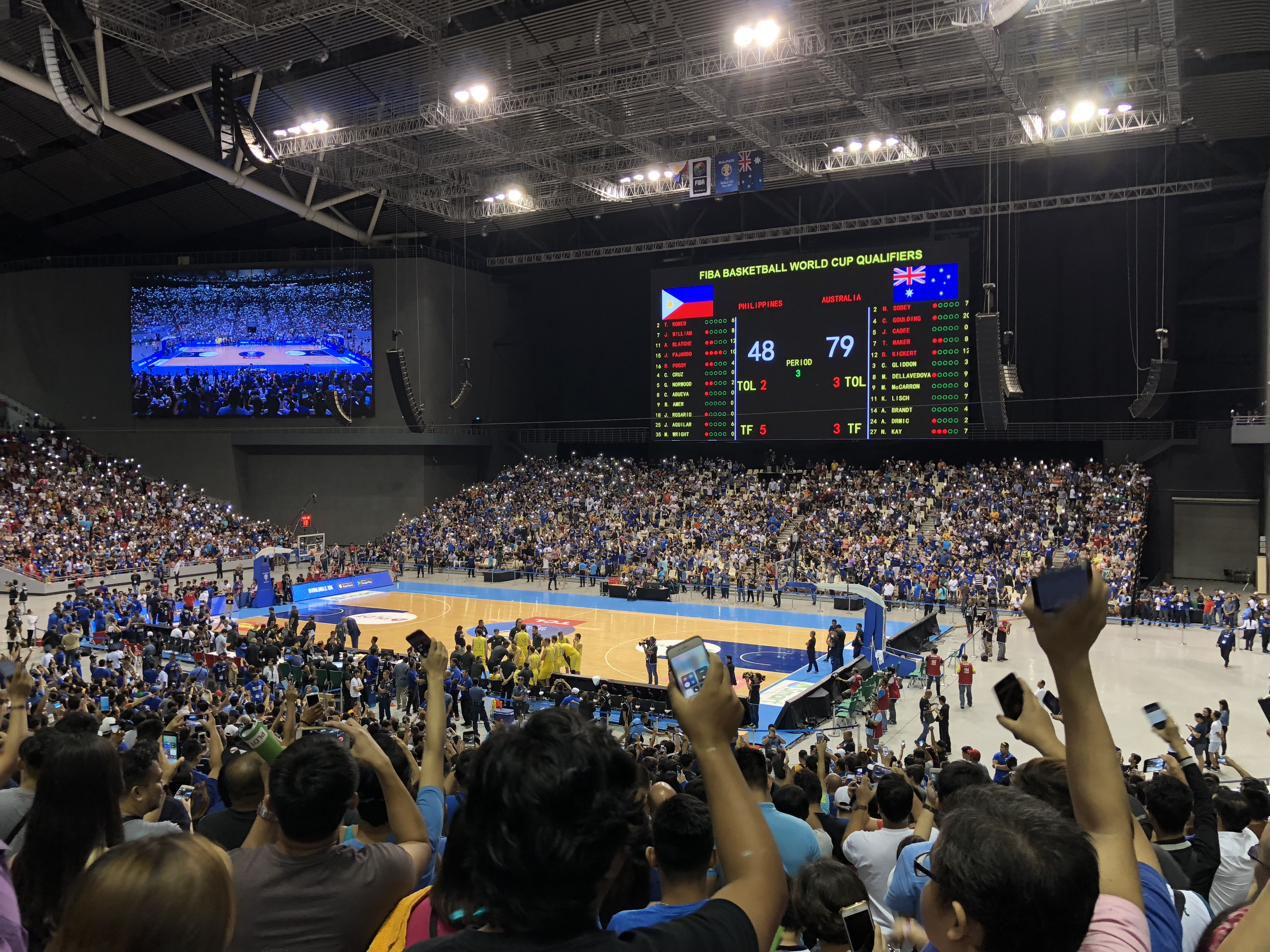
- The Philippine Arena, the venue of the Philippines–Australia match, a few minutes before the brawl.
Philippines	Australia
(Philippines)	(Australia)
53	89
- Match abandoned with 1:57 remaining in the third quarter due to the Philippines having insufficient eligible players.
	1	2	3	Total
Philippines	18	19	16	53
Australia	23	29	37	89
- Date: 2 July 2018
- Venue: Philippine Arena, Bocaue, Bulacan, Philippines
- Coaches: Chot Reyes (PHI); Andrej Lemanis (AUS)
- Referees: Ahmed Al-Bulushi (OMA); Hatim Al-Harbi (KSA); Paul Skayem (LIB)
- Attendance: 22,181

On 2 July 2018, a brawl occurred during a basketball game between the Philippines and Australia men's national basketball teams at the Philippine Arena in Bocaue, Bulacan. The match was part of the International Basketball Federation's (FIBA) 2019 Basketball World Cup Asian qualification process.

The brawl began when Philippine player Roger Pogoy hit Australian player Chris Goulding with two hard fouls, triggering a fight between players from both teams. It caused a delay of thirty minutes in the match, and resulted in the ejection of four Australian players and nine Philippine players. The game was resumed briefly with three remaining Philippine players, before June Mar Fajardo and Gabe Norwood intentionally fouled out, resulting in a victory for Australia.

FIBA imposed sanctions on both sides. Suspensions were given to ten Filipino players (for a maximum of six games) and three Australian players (maximum of five games), along with the Philippines' head coach and assistant coach; both national federations were fined. The three referees who officiated at the match were suspended for a year.

Despite the brawl, both teams advanced to the second round of the 2019 FIBA Basketball World Cup Asian qualifiers. The Philippine national team was ordered to play their next home match in the second round of the qualifiers behind closed doors, with the succeeding two home games being placed under probation. The brawl also played a part in their withdrawal from the 2018 Asian Games, a decision that was later reversed. Both teams managed to qualify for the 2019 FIBA Basketball World Cup in China.

== Background ==
=== Road to 2019 FIBA Basketball World Cup ===
For the 2019 FIBA Basketball World Cup, members of International Basketball Federation's (FIBA) Asia and Oceania confederations participated in one qualification process. For the first round of the joint Asia and Oceania qualifiers, the Philippines and Australia were drawn part of Group B along with Chinese Taipei and Japan.

The Philippines and Australia first played against each other in the qualifiers in Melbourne, Victoria, Australia. The home side Australia won over the visitors 84–68. Prior to the start of their second face off, this time in Bocaue, Bulacan, Philippines, the two teams had already qualified for the second round of the FIBA Basketball World Cup qualifiers.

The last FIBA Basketball World Cup qualifier match of the Philippines prior to their second match-up against Australia was against Chinese Taipei, away from home. They won the game by 22 points. The Philippines decided to retain ten players from the Chinese Taipei game for their next match, replacing Jio Jalalon and Allein Maliksi with Baser Amer and Carl Bryan Cruz. Australia suffered a 78–79 defeat to Japan prior to their second Philippines game but decided to retain the twelve players in their roster.

Road to 2019 FIBA Basketball World Cup (Asia First Round)
Table standings (Prior to 2 July 2018 games)	Games involving Philippines and Australia (prior to the brawl)				
Table standings (Prior to 2 July 2018 games)	Date	Game			Venue
Pos / Team / Pld / W / L / PF / PA / PD / Pts / Qualification; 1 / Australia (Q) / 5 / 4 / 1 / 436 / 339 / +97 / 9 (Note: Australia 84–68 Philippines) / Second round; 2 / Philippines (Q) / 5 / 4 / 1 / 417 / 393 / +24 / 9 / Second round; 3 / Chinese Taipei / 5 / 1 / 4 / 358 / 444 / −86 / 6 (Note: Japan 69–70 Chinese Taipei) / Second round; 4 / Japan / 5 / 1 / 4 / 361 / 396 / −35 / 6; Updated to match(es) played on 29 June 2018. Source: FIBA; Rules for classification: 1) Points; 2) Head-to-head results; 3) Points difference; 4) Points scored. (Q) Qualified for the phase indicated Notes:	24 November 2017	Japan	71–77	Philippines	Tokyo
	24 November 2017	Chinese Taipei	66–104	Australia	Taipei
	27 November 2017	Australia	82–58	Japan	Adelaide
	27 November 2017	Philippines	90–83	Chinese Taipei	Quezon City
	22 February 2018	Australia	84–68	Philippines	Melbourne
	25 February 2018	Australia	88–68	Chinese Taipei	Melbourne
	25 February 2018	Philippines	89–84	Japan	Pasay
	29 June 2018	Japan	79–78	Australia	Chiba
	29 June 2018	Chinese Taipei	71–93	Philippines	Taipei
	2 July 2018	Philippines	TBD	Australia	Bocaue

=== Closed door practice ===
Tensions were already running high between the Australia and Philippine teams prior to the start of the game. During their closed-door practice on 1 July 2018, the Australia team removed the decals of corporate sponsors PLDT and Chooks-to-Go on the court, reportedly due to player safety issues. Officials from the Philippine national basketball association, the Samahang Basketbol ng Pilipinas (SBP), criticized the move, stating that the Australians should have asked permission. Philippine head coach Chot Reyes said that the Australians removed the decals for being slippery and added that the decals were approved to use by FIBA, mentioning that SBP and FIBA officials were at the venue. Reyes, along with SBP official Manny V. Pangilinan, posted a video of the act through Twitter, expressing displeasure at the move and promising that they would "not back down" from the Australians.

Australia apologized for the incident and the SBP accepted the apology. However, the SBP maintained that the actions of the Australian side were unacceptable. The decals were restored two hours prior to tip-off.

=== Pre-game confrontations ===
During the pre-game warm-ups, Philippine players began crowding onto the Australian half of the court. Calvin Abueva, a member of the Philippine team, attempted to trip Australian player Daniel Kickert, who countered back by pushing and shoving another member of the Philippine team who he assumed was the culprit. A short confrontation between the two teams resulted thereafter, which had to be defused by the referees before the start of the match. Abueva admitted to trying to trip Kickert, but insisted that the Australians had been 'bullying' them even before he did so.

== Match details ==
The Australians dominated the match, outscoring the Philippines in all three quarters played. The host was competitive against the visitors in the first quarter until Australia gained a 9-point lead by the second quarter. The Philippines never recovered as Australia later achieved a double-digit lead against the hosts. Chris Goulding led the Australians in the scoring by contributing 20 points, while Andray Blatche led the Philippines with 12 points.

The three referees who officiated the match were Ahmed Al Bulushi of Oman, Hatim Alharbi of Saudi Arabia, and Paul Skayem of Lebanon. Jordanian official Fadi Adnan As’Ad Sabbah was the FIBA game commissioner.

2 July 2018
19:30 (UTC+8)

Boxscore

Philippines	53–89	Australia
Scoring by quarter: 18–23, 19–29, 16–37, game abandoned
Pts: Blatche 12; Rebs: Blatche 10; Asts: Romeo 5		Pts: Goulding 20; Rebs: three players 4 Asts: three players 4

Philippine Arena, Bocaue
Attendance: 22,181
Referees: Ahmed Al-Bulushi (OMA), Hatim Al-Harbi (KSA), Paul Skayem (LBN)

Philippines	Australia

=== Brawl ===
Philippines–Australia basketball brawl
- Date: 2 July 2018
- Venue: Philippine Arena
- Location: Bocaue, Bulacan
- Also known as: Philippines–Australia basketbrawl
- Type: Brawl
- Cause: Alleged provocation from either sides
- Filmed by: ESPN5
- Participants: Players and officials of the Philippine and Australia national teams, Filipino fans
- Outcome: Match continued after 13 players were ejected but the match was later abandoned after two of three remaining Filipino players intentionally fouled out. See below for more information.

The Philippines was trailing 48–79 when the brawl began during the third quarter, with four minutes and one second left to play. Roger Pogoy hit Chris Goulding with two hard fouls, one away from the play. Kickert, Goulding's teammate, retaliated by elbowing Pogoy in the face. Kickert's response caused Blatche and Jayson Castro to rush to retaliate. Other Filipino players from the bench rushed onto the court to join the brawl.

Blatche attempted to throw a punch against Kickert but was stopped by Australian player Thon Maker, who in turn was hit from behind by Filipino player Terrence Romeo. Team officials and spectators also got involved in the brawl. A separate incident involved Nathan Sobey, who was punched in the face by Jio Jalalon, a Filipino player who was not on the roster. Peter Aguilar, the father of Japeth Aguilar, threw a chair at Sobey.

At one point, Filipino players, officials and fans sitting at the court-side rushed in to attack Goulding, who was lying on the floor defending himself. Philippine assistant coach Jong Uichico was seen punching and dropping a chair on Goulding. Filipino player Troy Rike came to Goulding's defence and stood over him to protect him from further attacks. Australian assistant coach Luc Longley intervened to clear away the people attacking Goulding and Sobey. Allein Maliksi, another Filipino player not part of the roster like Jalalon, also took part in the brawl.

Marc Pingris was criticized for taking a group selfie of himself and the rest of the Philippine team on-court after the brawl.

Years later, Maker said that the Australian players had to show incredible restraint while enduring their teammate being beaten because they were afraid that the entire crowd might have rushed in to join the brawl.

=== Match resumption and call off ===
Ejected players after the brawl
Philippines	Australia
Terrence Romeo; Jayson Castro; Calvin Abueva; Andray Blatche; Roger Pogoy; Troy Rosario; Japeth Aguilar; Carl Bryan Cruz; Matthew Wright	Chris Goulding; Daniel Kickert; Thon Maker; Nathan Sobey
9 players	4 players
13 players total

The brawl caused a thirty-minute stoppage of the match. The referees along with security officials left the court and went to the OB Van of ESPN 5 outside the arena, which was covering the match, to review footage of the brawl from different camera angles. They returned to the court to announce sanctions.

Match officials ruled that thirteen players would be ejected before play was resumed. Officials ejected four Australian players and nine Filipino players, leaving the Philippine team with only three players. The match was resumed despite this, since FIBA rules state that play should continue as long as both teams have more than one player. June Mar Fajardo and Gabe Norwood, two of the three remaining Filipino players, intentionally fouled out, leaving Baser Amer as the last Filipino player on the court. The game was prematurely ended with one minute and fifty-seven seconds remaining in the third quarter.

== Aftermath ==
The Philippines lost by default due to a lack of eligible players because of the ejection of nine of its players and two of the three remaining players intentionally fouling out. The Philippines ended its first round campaign with four wins and two defeats, both against Australia, settling for second place in Group B while Australia lost only one of its six games topping the group. Both teams advanced to the second round of the qualifiers.

Fearing for their own safety, the Australia team remained in the Philippine Arena for several hours after the match and changed hotels. A scheduled press conference at the Crowne Plaza Hotel in Pasig scheduled for 3 July 2018 was cancelled.

=== Reactions ===
==== Official statements by involved parties ====
Basketball Australia apologized for the brawl, accepting the Australia team's role in the incident but expressing concern for the involvement of officials and fans in the fight. The SBP apologized to Filipino fans and to the international basketball community for the brawl, saying that the incident "breached the bounds of traditional Filipino hospitality" and asserting that "violence has no place in sports". Both federations later issued a joint statement apologizing for the brawl and admitting full responsibility for the incident.

==== Other reactions ====
Australia's National Basketball League (NBL) said while the Australia team should accept consequences regarding the brawl, they also condemned players, officials, and fans of the Philippine team, stating what happened to the Australian side following the brawl was unacceptable. The SBP invited players of the Philippine team for a closed-door meeting scheduled on 5 July 2018 to discuss the incident, which could possibly impose its own fines and suspensions to players who were involved in the brawl.

Pingris' group selfie was criticized as insensitive by head coach Chot Reyes. Quinito Henson said that, based on how they knew Pingris personally, the selfie was an attempt to defuse tension. Reyes said that he would have stopped Pingris from taking the selfie given the circumstances.

According to Australia head coach Andrej Lemanis, the brawl may cause the U.S. National Basketball Association (NBA), which was already reluctant to release its players for the 2019 FIBA Basketball World Cup qualifiers, to hesitate even more about releasing its players for international play short of the FIBA Basketball World Cup or the 2020 Summer Olympics.

==== Further allegations ====
===== Closed-door practice sabotage =====
After the brawl-marred game, Australia's coach Andrej Lemanis accused the Philippines of sabotaging his side's training the day before the match. He stated that when the Australian team went to the training venue, one of the courts in the venue had a rim that was "obviously too high" and when officials came to measure the rim it was too high by 6 to 7 inches (15 to 18 cm). Lemanis then alleged that the people helping them in the court disappeared from the venue. He added that it was then that it became evident to his team that the court was unsafe to play on because of the way the decals were installed while reiterating Australia's early acknowledgement of not following the "correct process" in removing the decals. Lemanis said they decided to remove the decals due to time constraints caused by their limited practice time.

==== Racism ====
Alleged incidents of racism were raised after the brawl. Winston Baltasar, a Filipino freelance photographer covering the event, alleged that Australian players had used racial slurs against Filipinos during an interview at The Ticket, a radio program of Australia's Australian Broadcasting Corporation (ABC). He said that Filipino players had been called "monkeys". The Australian Basketballers' Association and Basketball Australia issued a joint statement calling Baltasar's remarks as "unsubstantiated and highly defamatory" and expressed disappointment with the ABC's decision to publish material relating to the remark. In an earlier interview on SportsCenter Philippines, Reyes said that he hadn't heard any incident of racist abuse by the Australian players.

=== Investigation ===
FIBA opened disciplinary proceedings against both Australia and the Philippines following the brawl. The referee of the match submitted statements and presented evidence to FIBA regarding the match and the brawl and both the basketball federations of Australia and the Philippines were given video copies recording the incident. Both Basketball Australia and the SBP were asked by FIBA to submit their own positions stating their sides regarding the brawl by 10 July 2018 but the deadline was later extended to midnight of 13 July 2018 (GMT+6).

=== Sanctions ===
Prior to the imposition of sanctions by FIBA, Al Panlilio of Samahang Basketbol ng Pilipinas (SBP) expressed hope that FIBA would view the incident as an isolated case and not affect the hosting rights of the Philippines for the 2023 FIBA Basketball World Cup. He also expected that both federations of Australia and the Philippines would be fined and that it would be a surprise if FIBA would choose to impose indefinite suspensions of the respective basketball federations of Australia and the Philippines. He pointed to the incident between Serbia and Greece in 2010 as a precedent for his expectation.

On 19 July, FIBA handed down their decision after conducting disciplinary investigation. Ten players from the Philippine basketball team, its coach Chot Reyes, and assistant coach Jong Uichico, as well as three players from Australia were given suspension from playing future games in the qualifiers (six games maximum). Reyes was suspended for a single match while Uichico was suspended for three games. According to the SBP, FIBA was clear that the ban imposed on the Philippine players does not apply to the national team's planned participation in the 2018 Asian Games in Indonesia, as well as their participation with their respective teams in the Philippine Basketball Association, and that the match suspensions were to be served in the 2019 FIBA World Cup qualifiers.

The Samahang Basketbol ng Pilipinas was fined CHF 250,000 for "unsportsmanlike behavior of its delegation members and of its public, as well as for insufficient organisation of the game" while Basketball Australia was fined CHF 100,000 for removing the court decals prior to the match. The fines will be used to fund FIBA's "Basketball for Good" program.

The Philippines played their next home court match behind closed doors (against Qatar on 17 September, at the Smart Araneta Coliseum in Quezon City, with media coverage), while a ban for two more home games as the country have been placed under a probationary period of three years. However, Samahang Basketball ng Pilipinas executive director Sonny Barrios stated if the behind-closed-doors game went well, the homecourt game ban can be possibly lifted and will be open for fans. The country's co-hosting of the 2023 FIBA World Cup is not affected by the sanctions.

The three referees who officiated the brawl-marred match also faced immediate removal from the FIBA Elite Program and suspension from officiating international competitions sanctioned or organized by FIBA for 1 year.

==== Summary ====
Player sanctions

Philippines
Player	Suspension
Calvin Abueva	6 games
RR Pogoy	5 games
Carl Bryan Cruz	5 games
Jio Jalalon	5 games
Andray Blatche	3 games
Jayson Castro	3 games
Terrence Romeo	3 games
Troy Rosario	3 games
Japeth Aguilar	1 game
Matthew Wright	1 game

Australia
Player	Suspension
Daniel Kickert	5 games
Thon Maker	3 games
Chris Goulding	1 game

Match suspension by game – 2019 FIBA World Cup qualification : Asia Second Round

Philippines
Match No.	Opponent	Date	Suspended players
1.	Iran	13 September 2018	Abueva; Blatche; Castro; Cruz; Jalalon; Pogoy; Romeo; Rosario; Aguilar; Wright
2.	Qatar	17 September 2018	Abueva; Blatche; Castro; Cruz; Jalalon; Pogoy; Romeo; Rosario
3.	Kazakhstan	30 November 2018	Abueva; Blatche; Castro; Cruz; Jalalon; Pogoy; Romeo; Rosario
4.	Iran	3 December 2018	Abueva; Cruz; Jalalon; Pogoy
5.	Qatar	21 February 2019	Abueva; Cruz; Jalalon; Pogoy
6.	Kazakhstan	24 February 2019	Abueva

Australia
Match No.	Opponent	Date	Suspended players
1.	Qatar	13 September 2018	Goulding; Kickert; Maker
2.	Kazakhstan	17 September 2018	Kickert; Maker
3.	Iran	30 November 2018	Kickert; Maker
4.	Qatar	3 December 2018	Kickert
5.	Kazakhstan	21 February 2019	Kickert
6.	Iran	24 February 2019	None

Sanctions on officials

Official	Position	Association	Sanction
Chot Reyes	Philippines head coach	Philippines	1-game suspension / CHF 10,000 fine
Jong Uichico	Philippines assistant coach	Philippines	2-game suspension
Ahmed Al Bulushi	Referee	Oman	1-year officiating ban
Hatim Alharbi	Referee	Saudi Arabia	1-year officiating ban
Paul Skayem	Referee	Lebanon	1-year officiating ban

Sanctions on associations

Association	Sanction
Samahang Basketbol ng Pilipinas	CHF 250,000 fine, ban to host two home games of Philippine national team with the next home game to be held behind closed doors
Basketball Australia	CHF 100,000 fine

=== Impact ===
==== 2019 FIBA World Cup qualification ====
Both the Philippines and Australia managed to qualify for the 2019 FIBA Basketball World Cup in China. The Philippines was forced to revamp its roster for the September 2018 qualification window and Yeng Guiao was appointed as their head coach. The Philippines lost two matches at home in the November 2018 window to Iran and Kazakhstan threatening their bid to qualify for the World Cup. However they managed to secure qualification after winning their two matches away from home in the February 2019 window against Qatar and Kazakhstan. The Philippines qualified as the best fourth placer in the Asian qualifiers and had to rely on South Korea winning over Lebanon in the same qualification window.

First round final standing
2019 FIBA Basketball World Cup qualification (Asia) – Group B

Pos	Team	Pld	W	L	PF	PA	PD	Pts	Qualification
1	Australia	6	5	1	525	392	+133	11	Second round
2	Philippines	6	4	2	470	482	−12	10	Second round
3	Japan	6	2	4	469	464	+5	8	Second round
4	Chinese Taipei	6	1	5	426	552	−126	7	

Source: FIBA
Rules for classification: 1) Points; 2) Head-to-head results; 3) Points difference; 4) Points scored.

Second round final standing
2019 FIBA Basketball World Cup qualification (Asia) – Group F

Pos	Team	Pld	W	L	PF	PA	PD	Pts	Qualification
1	Australia	12	10	2	1055	727	+328	22	2019 FIBA Basketball World Cup
2	Japan	12	8	4	988	844	+144	20 (Note: Japan 2–0; Iran 0–2)	2019 FIBA Basketball World Cup
3	Iran	12	8	4	890	811	+79	20	2019 FIBA Basketball World Cup
4	Philippines	12	7	5	970	935	+35	19	2019 FIBA Basketball World Cup
5	Kazakhstan	12	4	8	828	963	−135	16	
6	Qatar	12	2	10	732	1027	−295	14	

Source: FIBA
Rules for classification: 1) Points; 2) Head-to-head results; 3) Points difference; 4) Points scored.

==== Philippines' Asian Games participation ====
The brawl played a part in the Philippines' withdrawal from the basketball competition of the 2018 Asian Games. Before the brawl incident, the Samahang Basketbol ng Pilipinas (SBP) planned to send a national team composed of the core of the TNT KaTropa of the Philippine Basketball Association. However such plan was cancelled after several players of the ball club along with naturalized player Andray Blatche got involved in the brawl. Though the player suspensions has no bearing in the Asian Games since the sanctions will be served in the next round of the FIBA Basketball World Cup qualifiers, the SBP decided not to include any of players suspended due to the brawl in the Philippines' Asian Games roster.

A plan was devised to send a national team composed of the core of the Rain or Shine Elasto Painters instead of TNT with NLEX Road Warriors coach Yeng Guiao to mentor the team. The Philippine Basketball Association officially announced the participation of Rain or Shine in the Asian Games on 26 July 2018 with the SBP declaring on the same day that the Philippine national team's withdrawal from the continental games saying that it and the national team intends "regroup, prepare for the process of appealing the FIBA Disciplinary Panel's recent decision, and aim for sustainable success in future tournaments."

The decision to withdraw was reversed on 5 August 2018 due to "clamor from fans".

==== 2019 FIBA World Cup performance and further years ====
For the Philippines national team, the brawl became the start of a downward spiral. The Filipinos finished last at 32nd place during the World Cup in China, missing their chance of qualifying for the 2020 Summer Olympics, extending their Olympic basketball drought to 48 years. As a result, the Samahang Basketbol ng Pilipinas has chartered a new direction for the team leading up to their hosting of the 2023 FIBA Basketball World Cup and also in hopes of qualification to the 2024 Summer Olympics in Paris, which involves the development and international exposure of young players.

Australia went on to clinch the fourth-place spot at the World Cup. The Boomers also managed to qualify for the Olympics as the best Oceania team, where they won the bronze medal after defeating Slovenia.

Australia also went on to win back-to-back FIBA Asia Cup titles at the 2022 edition of the tournament and the Philippines played at the Philippine Arena for the first time since the incident during the sixth window of the 2023 FIBA Basketball World Cup Asian Qualifiers, winning against Lebanon, 107–96, on 24 February 2023, and faced Jordan in a losing effort, 90–91, at the same venue on 27 February.

The brawl is still being revisited years after it occurred. In May 2025, SBP president Al Panlilio said that they have moved on from the brawl and has developed a harmonious relationship with Basketball Australia ever since. The Philippines hosted a game against Australia for the first time since 2018 on 1 March 2026 as part of the second window of the first round of the 2027 FIBA Basketball World Cup Asian Qualifiers at the SM Mall of Asia Arena in Pasay.

== See also ==
- Malice at the Palace
- Knicks–Nuggets brawl
- Violence in sports
- List of violent spectator incidents in sports
- Sparks–Shock brawl
- 2011 Crosstown Shootout brawl
- 2010 Acropolis Basketball Tournament brawl
- Basketbrawl (1990 Atari video game)
