= Malice at the Palace =

2004 NBA game ended by a brawl

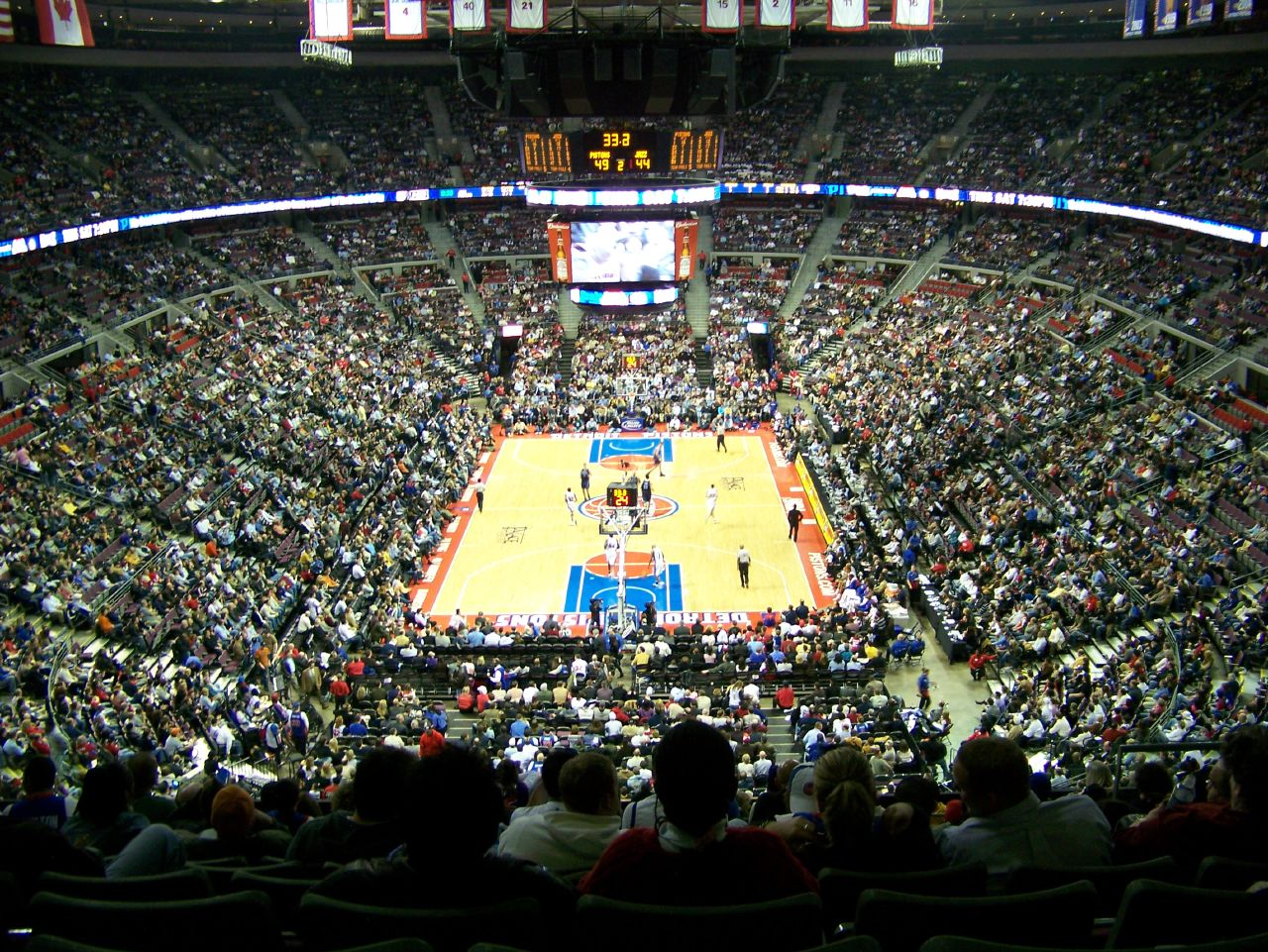
- The Palace of Auburn Hills, where the brawl took place
| Indiana Pacers | Detroit Pistons |
|---|---|
| 97 | 82 |
| Head coach: Rick Carlisle | Head coach: Larry Brown |
- Game called off with 45.9 seconds remaining in the fourth quarter
| | 1 | 2 | 3 | 4 | Total |
|---|---|---|---|---|---|
| Indiana Pacers | 34 | 25 | 21 | 17 | 97 |
| Detroit Pistons | 27 | 16 | 23 | 16 | 82 |
- Date: November 19, 2004
- Venue: The Palace of Auburn Hills, Auburn Hills, Michigan, U.S.
- Referees: Tim Donaghy; Ron Garretson; Tommy Nuñez Jr.
- Attendance: 22,076
- Network: ESPN; FSN Midwest; FSN Detroit; WDIV-TV

"Malice at the Palace" was a fight involving players and fans during a National Basketball Association (NBA) game between the Indiana Pacers and the defending champion Detroit Pistons on November 19, 2004, at the Palace in Auburn Hills, Michigan. The Associated Press called it "the most infamous brawl in NBA history".

Pistons center Ben Wallace attempted a layup shot during the final minute but was fouled from behind by Pacers small forward Ron Artest. A furious Wallace then shoved Artest, and a fight broke out on the court between players from both teams. The players had been separated, game officials were discussing consequences, and Artest was lying on the scorer's table pending an interview when a Pistons fan named John Green hit him with a drink thrown from several rows up in the stands.

Artest angrily charged into the crowd and grabbed another fan, Michael Ryan, who he mistakenly identified as the culprit who had thrown the drink. Several Pacers teammates followed, more drinks and punches were thrown randomly, and the incident quickly escalated into a large brawl that spread from the stands to the court and involved fans and players from both teams. The game was abandoned and never completed, as a massive police presence was called to the venue to restore order and, later, to allow the visiting Pacers to safely leave the building.

After the game, the NBA suspended nine players, including Artest and Wallace, for a total of 146 games, leading to the players losing a collective $11 million in salary. Five players were charged with assault, and were eventually sentenced to a year of probation and community service. Five fans also faced assault charges and were banned from attending Pistons home games for life. The fight also led the NBA to increase security between players and fans and limit the sale of alcohol at games.

== Background ==
The Indiana Pacers and Detroit Pistons had not met since the previous season's Eastern Conference Finals, which the Pistons won in six games en route to their first NBA title since the "Bad Boys" era of the late 1980s and early 1990s. Coming off a two-game winning streak, the Pacers held a 6–2 record, while the defending champion Pistons had begun their season 4–3. The game was televised nationally on ESPN along with both teams' local broadcast affiliates, FSN Midwest (Indiana) and WDIV-TV (Detroit).

The Pacers got off to a quick start, opening up a 20-point lead with seven minutes to go before halftime. The Pistons managed to cut into the lead, trailing by 16 points by halftime. The Pistons opened the third quarter with a 9–2 run, but the Pacers ended it with a buzzer-beating three-pointer and a layup from Jamaal Tinsley heading into the fourth quarter.

Richard Hamilton and Lindsey Hunter started the fourth quarter with consecutive three-point field goals, as the Pistons cut into the lead again, but Stephen Jackson's back-to-back field goals gave the Pacers a 93–79 lead with 3:52 remaining, and essentially putting the game away. Despite the lopsided score near the end of the game, most key players on both teams remained in the game.

The Pacers were led by the 24-point effort of small forward Ron Artest, who scored 17 in the first quarter. Jermaine O'Neal notched a double-double with 20 points and 13 rebounds. Tinsley had 13 points, eight assists and a career-high eight steals. Hamilton led the Pistons with 20 points. Rasheed Wallace and Ben Wallace both recorded a double-double.

== Fight ==
External videos
- ESPN's footage of the fight on YouTube

Ron Artest running into the stands to attack Michael Ryan, who he believed threw a cup at him. The man in the blue jersey and white baseball cap to Artest's left, John Green, was the actual person responsible.

The brawl began with 45.9 seconds remaining in the final quarter of the game, when the Pacers led 97–82. Pistons center Ben Wallace was fouled from behind by Artest, who slapped him across the back of the head during a layup attempt. Wallace later said that Artest had warned that if they fought him he would be hit. Wallace responded by shoving Artest in the face with both hands, causing players from both teams to quickly get in between them as they attempted to keep the two separated.

Pistons coach Larry Brown later said he was initially not concerned, because when altercations occur in NBA games, they usually last a few seconds. After breaking up the confrontation, the referees discussed fouls and ejections before the game resumed. Sportscaster Mike Breen, calling the game for ESPN, believed Wallace would be ejected, while Bill Walton was of the opinion that Stephen Jackson should be ejected as well for shouting at the Pistons players and aggravating the situation. Breen expressed concern that, if Wallace got ejected, he would have to walk past the Pacers bench, which could have caused another incident.

As the referees huddled to discuss penalties, Artest went to the scorer's table and lay down on it, putting on a headset to speak with Pacers radio broadcaster Mark Boyle, though the broadcast team did not activate his microphone. Boyle recalled that the broadcasting team knew Artest's personality and "there was no way we were going to put an open mic in front of Ron Artest in that situation". Pacers president Donnie Walsh later stated that Artest was following advice he had received on how to calm down and avoid trouble in a volatile situation.

Ninety seconds after Wallace shoved Artest, most of both teams' players and coaches were huddled at midcourt, attempting to calm down Wallace. Tayshaun Prince was the only player on either team who did not leave the bench during the entire incident. Others became automatically eligible for one-game suspensions. While Artest was lying on the table, Wallace threw a towel at him, causing Artest to briefly stand up before he was held back by coaches and teammate Reggie Miller. A spectator, John Green, then threw a plastic cup of Diet Coke at Artest, hitting him in the chest.

Artest immediately reacted to this by jumping off the table, charging into the stands, and grabbing another spectator, Michael Ryan, whom he mistakenly believed was responsible. Artest shouted at Ryan, "Did you do it?", to which Ryan replied, "No, man. No!" Pacers play-by-play announcer Mark Boyle stood from his chair at the broadcast table in an attempt to hold back Artest and was knocked backwards and stepped on, suffering five fractured vertebrae and a gouge on his head. Afterwards, Artest apologized to Boyle and said he had not realized he had trampled him.

Jackson followed Artest into the stands and punched a fan, William Paulson, in the face in retaliation for the man throwing another drink in Artest's face while he was being restrained by other spectators. Pacers players Eddie Gill, David Harrison, Reggie Miller (who did not play because of an injury), Fred Jones, and Jamaal Tinsley, the Pistons' Rasheed Wallace, and numerous personnel (including Pistons radio analyst and former player Rick Mahorn) also quickly entered the stands to get Artest and Jackson, and to break up the fighting. Green punched Artest twice in the head from behind, as did Ben Wallace's brother, David. By this point, the incident had already spiraled out of control. More fans then began throwing drinks, food, and other objects into the melee and some fans went on the court in the confusion.

As Artest walked out of the stands, he was confronted by two more fans, Alvin "A.J." Shackleford and Charlie Haddad, who had gone down to the court. Artest punched Shackleford in the face, causing Haddad to intervene by pushing away Artest, before both fans fell over. While Haddad was on the floor, Anthony Johnson struck him in the back of the head. As Haddad stood up, Jermaine O'Neal punched him in the jaw after a running start, while slipping in liquid and falling backwards, causing witnesses Scot Pollard, ESPN sideline reporter Jim Gray, and Pistons executive Tom Wilson to briefly fear that O'Neal would kill Haddad.

William Wesley pulled Artest away from the fans, and Brown tried to calm Wallace. The scene became more chaotic as additional fans went onto the court and additional items were thrown, overwhelming arena security personnel as they tried to reestablish order. Although Auburn Hills police had plans to handle many types of disorder, and had three officers in the arena, they were unprepared for the possibility of players entering the stands or masses of fans going onto the court.

Pacers coach Rick Carlisle said, "I felt like I was fighting for my life out there." One reporter who attempted to stop Tinsley from entering the stands recalled that the player "went through me like I was butter", and NBA Commissioner David Stern, watching the game on television, recalled that he said, "Holy shit." O'Neal later said, "As bad as it looked on TV, it was at least 20 times worse in person." Pacers assistant coach Chuck Person compared the situation to being "trapped in a gladiator-type scene where the fans were the lions and we were just trying to escape with our lives. That's how it felt. That there was no exit. That you had to fight your way out." Players' children and others in the audience cried from fear and shock. Fearful fans tried to flee. Derrick Coleman stood near Brown and Brown's ball boy son to protect them.

Referees ended the game with 45.9 seconds remaining, and awarded the Pacers a 97–82 win. Pistons fans booed the Pacers players as they were escorted from the court by officials and security, and continued to throw beverages, popcorn and other objects (including a steel folding chair that nearly hit O'Neal) at them as they walked under the tunnel to the locker room. Brown tried to talk to the fans over the loudspeaker of the arena in an attempt to stop the chaos, but his pleas availed nothing, and he threw down the microphone in exasperation.

Pistons public address announcer John Mason implored the remaining crowd to leave the court and arena because the game was over, and pleaded with fans to not throw any objects or engage in fighting. No players from either team spoke to the media before leaving the arena. Eventually, police officers swarmed the arena, threatening to handcuff those who would not leave. Nine spectators were injured, and two were hospitalized.

In the Pacers' locker room, O'Neal and Carlisle nearly got into a fight, as O'Neal was upset that some coaches had tried to restrain players while they were defending themselves out on the court. After everyone calmed down, Artest asked Jackson, "Jack, you think we going to get in trouble?" Jackson replied, "Are you serious, bro? Trouble? Ron, we'll be lucky if we still have a fucking job!" The conversation convinced an amazed Jackson and Pollard that Artest "wasn't in his right mind, to ask that question".

Auburn Hills police entered the locker room to make arrests, but the team rushed Artest onto the bus and refused to take him off. The police decided to protect the Pacers as they left the arena, delaying decisions about criminal charges and arrests until after reviewing videos of the incident. By the time the Pacers' team bus departed, dozens of police cruisers were stationed in the parking lot and lined the surrounding road.

== Charges ==
| Player | Suspension by the NBA | Salary lost |
|---|---|---|
| Ron Artest (IND)* | Remainder of the season (86 games; 73 regular season and 13 playoff) | US$4,997,500 |
| Stephen Jackson (IND)* | 30 games | US$1,750,000 |
| Jermaine O'Neal (IND)* | 15 games (originally set at 25 games, reduced on appeal) | US$4,115,000 |
| Ben Wallace (DET) | 6 games | US$400,000 |
| Anthony Johnson (IND)* | 5 games | US$122,222 |
| Reggie Miller (IND) | 1 game | US$61,111 |
| Chauncey Billups (DET) | 1 game | US$60,611 |
| Derrick Coleman (DET) | 1 game | US$50,000 |
| Elden Campbell (DET) | 1 game | US$48,888 |
| David Harrison (IND)* | None | None |
* indicates players who faced legal consequences; they all received similar sentences: One year's probation; Community service (60 hours for Artest, Harrison, Jackson, and O'Neal; 100 hours for Johnson); Anger management therapy

=== Suspensions ===
On November 20, 2004, the day after the brawl, the NBA suspended Artest, Jackson, O'Neal, and Wallace indefinitely, saying that their actions were "shocking, repulsive, and inexcusable". The following day, the NBA announced that nine players would be suspended for a total of what eventually became 146 games: 137 games for Pacers players and nine games for Pistons players. David Harrison was also seen fighting with fans, but the NBA stated that he would not be suspended because "the incident occurred as the players were attempting to leave the floor".

Artest was given the longest suspension; he was suspended for the remainder of the 2004–05 NBA season, a suspension that eventually totaled 86 games (73 regular season and 13 subsequent playoff games), the longest suspension for an on-court incident in NBA history, surpassing the 68-game suspension given to Latrell Sprewell after he assaulted his team’s coach in 1997, and the 26-game suspension given to Kermit Washington after he punched Rudy Tomjanovich in 1977. The players suspended also lost in excess of US$11 million in salary due to the suspensions, with Artest alone losing almost US$5 million.

In the week following the announcement of the suspensions, the players' union appealed the suspensions of Artest, Jackson, and O'Neal, saying they thought that commissioner Stern had "exceeded his authority". Jackson felt that despite losing millions the players were fortunate, as Stern could have expelled them from the league entirely.

A federal arbitrator upheld the full length of all suspensions, except that of O'Neal, which was reduced to 15 games. The NBA appealed the decision of the arbitrator to reduce O'Neal's suspension in federal court, and on December 24, a judge issued a temporary injunction allowing O'Neal to play until a full hearing was held on the NBA's appeal.

O'Neal played in two more games before the NBA's case was brought before the U.S. District Court in Brooklyn, New York, on December 30. The NBA argued that under the terms of the league's Collective Bargaining Agreement (CBA), Stern had absolute authority to hand out suspensions and hear appeals for all on-court incidents. The judge ruled that because O'Neal's behavior was an off-court incident, arbitration was allowed under the CBA and thus the arbitrator was within his rights to reduce the suspension. Despite O'Neal's successful appeal, no further appeals were made to reduce Artest's and Jackson's suspensions.

=== Legal consequences ===
Auburn Hills police obtained videotapes of media coverage of the fight. Green was identified by county prosecutor David Gorcyca, who had been his neighbor. On November 30, Palace Sports and Entertainment, the owner of the Pistons, banned Green and Haddad from attending any events at the Palace of Auburn Hills, including Pistons home games, and the DTE Energy Music Theatre revoked their season tickets and issued them refunds. Green had several previous criminal convictions, including counterfeiting, carrying a concealed weapon, felony assault, and three drunken driving convictions. He was on court-ordered probation from a DUI conviction at the time of the brawl.

In December 2004, five Pacers players and five Pistons fans (John Ackerman; John Green; Bryant Jackson; William Paulson; and David Wallace, Ben Wallace's brother) were charged with varying levels of assault and battery. Indiana's O'Neal, who also threw usher Melvin Kendziorski onto the scorer's table when attempting to enter the stands, and Pistons fan/spectator Green, who Gorcyca said "single-handedly incited" the brawl by throwing the cup at Artest, were charged with two counts.

Artest, Harrison, Jackson, and Anthony Johnson were charged with one count of assault and battery each. Three of the fans, including David Wallace, received one count of the same charge. Bryant Jackson, who had prior criminal convictions, was charged with felony assault for throwing a chair, which nearly hit O'Neal during the brawl. Two fans, Haddad and Shackleford, who entered the court during the fight were charged with trespassing. All of the fans involved were banned from attending Pistons home games.

In March 2005, Bryant Jackson pleaded no contest to a felony assault charge for throwing the chair. In May 2005, he was sentenced to two years' probation and ordered to pay $6,000 in restitution. David Wallace was convicted, and sentenced to one year of probation and community service for punching Pacers player Fred Jones from behind.

All five players who were charged pleaded no contest to the charges. In September 2005, Artest, Jackson, and O'Neal were all sentenced to one year on probation, 60 hours of community service, a $250 fine, and anger management counseling. A week later, Harrison received the same sentence. In October 2005, Johnson, the last player to be charged, received a similar sentence. He was ordered to serve 100 hours of community service.

In March 2006, a jury found Green guilty on one count of assault and battery for punching Artest in the stands. They acquitted him of an assault charge for throwing the cup. In May 2006, Green was sentenced to 30 days in jail and two years' probation. In November 2006, the Pistons issued a letter to Green informing him that he was banned for life from attending any Pistons home games under orders from the NBA, and he would be subject to trespassing charges if he was found attending. In a revision from his initial punishment two years prior, the ban no longer extended to other events at the Palace.

Multiple civil suits were filed against both the Indiana Pacers and its players by fans involved in the brawl; some were dismissed or lost at trial and others resulted in confidential out-of-court settlements.

== Aftermath ==
=== Public reaction ===
Several NBA players and coaches said the brawl was the worst fight they had ever seen. Hockey player Chris Chelios, who attended the game with Kid Rock, described the fight as unbelievable. Pacers fans began to refer to their team as "The Thugs". Pistons CEO Tom Wilson later stated that Artest's action took away physical barriers, such as tables and benches, that normally separate fans and players, and Indianapolis Star reporter Mark Montieth stated: "In a way, [Artest] provoked [the forthcoming assault] passively by lying down", even though Artest lying down was something he had done frequently to calm down.

In the post-game commentary on ESPN's NBA Shootaround, ESPN studio analysts blamed the Pistons' fans and not the players. John Saunders referred to the fans as "a bunch of punks", and Tim Legler said that "the fans crossed the line". Stephen A. Smith stated that, "They should be ashamed of themselves and some of them [the fans] should be arrested as far as I'm concerned." Their commentary prompted ESPN vice president Mark Shapiro to place calls to host Saunders, as well as analysts Legler, Smith, and Greg Anthony, as Shapiro felt their commentary was biased. The following Tuesday, Shapiro stated, "I wish the studio hadn't laid the blame solely on the backs of the fans Friday night."

A significant portion of media criticism was directed at the Pistons fans. 46% of the voters in the SportsNation poll believed that the fans were to blame for the incident. Other commentators said that Artest and the other players involved were to blame.

=== NBA reforms ===
Some NBA teams immediately increased protection of players and arenas, while the NBA reminded teams of existing security procedures. The league imposed new security guidelines on February 17, 2005, for all of its arenas. These new policies included a size limit of 24 US fl oz (710 ml) for alcohol purchases, a hard cap of two alcoholic beverages per purchase for any individual person, and the discontinuation of alcohol sales after the end of the third quarter. The NBA also later ordered that each team put at least three security guards between the players and the fans.

=== Events after the brawl ===
The Pacers and the Pistons played for the first time after the brawl on December 25 at the Conseco Fieldhouse in Indianapolis, Indiana. The Pistons won 98–93 without incident. Neither Artest nor Jackson played due to their suspensions; O'Neal played in his first game back after the arbitrator reduced his suspension to 15 games.

On March 25, 2005, the Pacers played at the Palace for the first time since the brawl. The game was delayed 90 minutes after a series of bomb threats were aimed at the Pacers locker room, but the game eventually started after no explosives were found. Two of the key figures in the original incident missed the game, as Artest was still suspended and O'Neal had an injured shoulder. In the game, the Pacers stopped the Pistons' 12-game home winning streak with a 94–81 win.

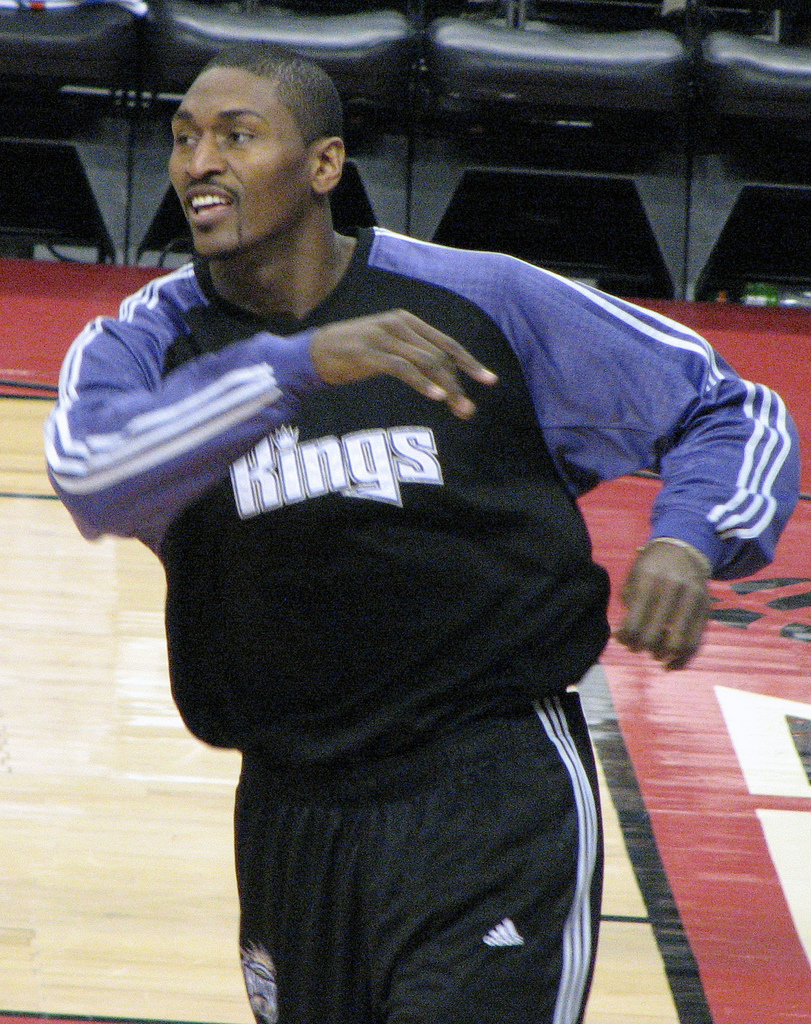
A year after the brawl, Ron Artest was traded to the Sacramento Kings.

In the 2005 NBA Playoffs, the Pistons entered as the second seed of the Eastern Conference, and the Pacers as the sixth. After the Pistons defeated the Philadelphia 76ers in five games, and the Pacers upset the third seed Boston Celtics in seven games, the two teams met in the second round. Although the Pacers went ahead two games to one, the Pistons clinched the series in six games with three straight wins. After eliminating Indiana, Detroit defeated the Miami Heat in the Eastern Conference Finals in seven games, then advanced to the NBA Finals, where they lost to the San Antonio Spurs in seven games.

After serving his suspension of the rest of the 2004–05 season, Artest returned to the Pacers at the beginning of the 2005–06 season. After playing 16 games, he demanded to be traded, and the Pacers put him on the injured list. The Pacers' Walsh said that Artest's demands were "the last straw", and many Pacers players who had fought in the brawl to help their teammate felt betrayed. Jackson later said, "I put my career on the line for him, going into the stands and fighting ... I lost $3 million [but] there was no 'thank you' or nothing."

After more than a month of inactivity, the Pacers traded Artest to the Sacramento Kings for Peja Stojaković. Artest faced Ben Wallace for the first time after the fight in November 2006, and made his return to Detroit in January 2007. During the Kings' 91–74 loss to the Pistons, Artest was booed constantly, but there were no unusual incidents. After a year's stop with the Houston Rockets in the 2008–09 season, Artest signed with the Los Angeles Lakers.

After winning his first NBA championship in 2010, Artest apologized to Jackson and other Pacers for being "so young and egotistical", stating "sometimes I feel like a coward when I see those guys. I'm on the Lakers, but I had a chance to win with you guys. I feel almost like a coward." On September 16, 2011, Artest legally changed his name to Metta World Peace.

During the lockout-shortened 2011–12 season, only one of the nine players who were suspended after the brawl was still with his original team: Ben Wallace, who signed with the Chicago Bulls as a free agent in 2006, later traded to the Cleveland Cavaliers, and rejoined the Pistons on August 7, 2009. Most of the players involved were traded to other teams, and since then, all of the players involved in the brawl have retired, with Artest being the last to do so in 2017.

The Pistons advanced to four straight Eastern Conference Finals after the brawl, and six straight overall, making them the first team since the Lakers in the 1980s to advance to six straight conference finals though they only won the championship once in that streak. After losing to the Pistons in the 2005 playoffs, the Pacers failed to finish above .500 until the 2011–12 season and missed the playoffs for four straight seasons from 2007 through 2010. Many Pacers from the 2004–05 season believe that the brawl and its consequences ruined a potential championship team, and that the referees did not assist the players well enough to be physically harmed by visitors.

On November 19, 2009, John Green, the fan who helped instigate the brawl, appeared on ESPN's First Take, where he talked about the incident and the changes he had made since then. Green recounted that he had an alcohol problem at the time and had since made an effort to deal with it. He said that Artest had apologized to him several months earlier, and wished to work together in some type of community service in Detroit. On June 9, 2017, Artest (then known as Metta World Peace) appeared on The Rich Eisen Show and alluded to his friendship with Green.

Almost four years after the incident, another similar incident happened also at the same arena, this time between the Los Angeles Sparks and the Detroit Shock (later the Tulsa Shock, now known as the Dallas Wings) of the WNBA. This gave it the nickname "The Malice at The Palace II".

== Box score ==
ESPN

November 19, 2004
8:00 p.m.

Box score

Indiana Pacers 97, Detroit Pistons 82
Scoring by quarter: 34–27, 25–16, 21–23, 17–16
| Pts: Artest 24; Rebs: O'Neal 13; Asts: Tinsley 8 | Pts: Hamilton 20; Rebs: B. Wallace, R. Wallace 10 each Asts: Billups, Prince 5 each |

The Palace of Auburn Hills, Auburn Hills, Michigan
Attendance: 22,076
Referees: Tim Donaghy, Ron Garretson, Tommy Nunez Jr.

Indiana Pacers
| Player | Pos | Min | FGM | FGA | FG% | 3PM | 3PA | 3P% | FTM | FTA | FT% | OREB | DREB | REB | AST | STL | BLK | TO | PF | PTS | |+/− |
|---|---|---|---|---|---|---|---|---|---|---|---|---|---|---|---|---|---|---|---|---|---|
| Ron Artest | F | 42:48 | 7 | 19 | .368 | 2 | 5 | .400 | 8 | 9 | .889 | 1 | 4 | 5 | 2 | 2 | 0 | 3 | 3 | 24 | 9 |
| Jamaal Tinsley | G | 39:25 | 5 | 10 | .500 | 3 | 5 | .600 | 0 | 0 | | 1 | 2 | 3 | 8 | 8 | 0 | 4 | 2 | 13 | 5 |
| Stephen Jackson | G | 38:20 | 5 | 12 | .417 | 1 | 3 | .333 | 2 | 2 | 1.000 | 0 | 3 | 3 | 3 | 0 | 0 | 0 | 4 | 13 | 11 |
| Austin Croshere | F | 37:29 | 4 | 7 | .571 | 2 | 3 | .667 | 5 | 5 | 1.000 | 1 | 5 | 6 | 0 | 3 | 0 | 0 | 1 | 15 | 7 |
| Jermaine O'Neal | C | 36:27 | 5 | 14 | .357 | 0 | 0 | | 10 | 14 | .714 | 3 | 10 | 13 | 3 | 0 | 0 | 0 | 4 | 20 | 7 |
| Fred Jones | | 16:19 | 1 | 4 | .250 | 1 | 2 | .500 | 0 | 0 | | 0 | 2 | 2 | 1 | 1 | 0 | 1 | 2 | 3 | 10 |
| David Harrison | | 14:54 | 1 | 1 | 1.000 | 0 | 0 | | 2 | 2 | 1.000 | 3 | 0 | 3 | 1 | 0 | 1 | 1 | 4 | 4 | 4 |
| Eddie Gill | | 9:39 | 1 | 2 | .500 | 0 | 1 | .000 | 3 | 3 | 1.000 | 0 | 2 | 2 | 1 | 1 | 0 | 1 | 0 | 5 | 12 |
| James Jones | | 4:39 | 0 | 1 | .000 | 0 | 1 | .000 | 0 | 0 | | 0 | 0 | 0 | 0 | 0 | 0 | 0 | 0 | 0 | 10 |
| Scot Pollard | | Did not dress | | | | | | | | | | | | | | | | | | | |
| John Edwards | | Did not play | | | | | | | | | | | | | | | | | | | |
| Jonathan Bender | | Did not dress | | | | | | | | | | | | | | | | | | | |
| Reggie Miller | | injured | | | | | | | | | | | | | | | | | | | |
| Team totals | | 240 | 29 | 70 | .414 | 9 | 20 | .450 | 30 | 35 | .857 | 9 | 28 | 37 | 19 | 15 | 1 | 10 | 21 | 97 | |

Detroit Pistons
| Player | Pos | Min | FGM | FGA | FG% | 3PM | 3PA | 3P% | FTM | FTA | FT% | OREB | DREB | REB | AST | STL | BLK | TO | PF | PTS | +/− |
|---|---|---|---|---|---|---|---|---|---|---|---|---|---|---|---|---|---|---|---|---|---|
| Richard Hamilton | G | 42:13 | 6 | 15 | .400 | 1 | 1 | 1.000 | 7 | 7 | 1.000 | 0 | 5 | 5 | 2 | 1 | 0 | 3 | 2 | 20 | −19 |
| Chauncey Billups | G | 41:21 | 3 | 10 | .300 | 0 | 5 | .000 | 7 | 7 | 1.000 | 0 | 7 | 7 | 5 | 1 | 0 | 1 | 2 | 13 | −7 |
| Ben Wallace | C | 38:43 | 5 | 11 | .455 | 0 | 0 | | 3 | 4 | .750 | 5 | 5 | 10 | 0 | 1 | 3 | 3 | 1 | 13 | −8 |
| Rasheed Wallace | F | 30:36 | 8 | 17 | .471 | 2 | 5 | .400 | 1 | 2 | .500 | 4 | 6 | 10 | 1 | 0 | 2 | 2 | 3 | 19 | −10 |
| Tayshaun Prince | F | 30:36 | 2 | 8 | .250 | 0 | 3 | .000 | 0 | 0 | | 2 | 3 | 5 | 5 | 0 | 1 | 3 | 4 | 4 | −8 |
| Antonio McDyess | | 18:51 | 0 | 5 | .000 | 0 | 0 | | 0 | 0 | | 1 | 1 | 2 | 2 | 1 | 0 | 0 | 3 | 0 | −8 |
| Lindsey Hunter | | 11:42 | 2 | 2 | 1.000 | 1 | 1 | 1.000 | 0 | 0 | | 0 | 0 | 0 | 0 | 0 | 0 | 1 | 3 | 5 | 0 |
| Darvin Ham | | 10:11 | 0 | 0 | | 0 | 0 | | 0 | 0 | | 0 | 1 | 1 | 1 | 0 | 0 | 1 | 2 | 0 | 6 |
| Smush Parker | | 8:33 | 1 | 2 | .500 | 0 | 1 | .000 | 0 | 0 | | 0 | 1 | 1 | 1 | 0 | 0 | 1 | 1 | 2 | −19 |
| Elden Campbell | | 7:14 | 2 | 4 | .500 | 0 | 0 | | 2 | 2 | 1.000 | 0 | 1 | 1 | 0 | 0 | 1 | 0 | 0 | 6 | −2 |
| Darko Miličić | | Did not play | | | | | | | | | | | | | | | | | | | |
| Derrick Coleman | | Did not play | | | | | | | | | | | | | | | | | | | |
| Carlos Delfino | | Injured | | | | | | | | | | | | | | | | | | | |
| Team totals | | 240 | 29 | 74 | .392 | 4 | 16 | .250 | 20 | 22 | .909 | 12 | 30 | 42 | 17 | 4 | 7 | 15 | 22 | 82 | |

== See also ==
- 2004–05 NBA season
- National Basketball Association criticisms and controversies
- Violence in sports
- List of violent spectator incidents in sports
- Bottlegate, a previous 2001 NFL incident which led to controls on beer sales and container types in that league
- Clemson–South Carolina football brawl, a brawl that happened the following day
- Hooliganism
- Knicks–Nuggets brawl
- Sparks–Shock brawl
- Punch-up in Piestany
- 2010 Acropolis Basketball Tournament brawl
- 2011 Crosstown Shootout brawl
- Philippines–Australia basketball brawl
- Colorado Avalanche–Detroit Red Wings brawl
- Minnesota Timberwolves-Detroit Pistons brawl
- Bryant–Wagner brawl
