= Heritage Bank Center =

Indoor arena in Cincinnati, Ohio, US

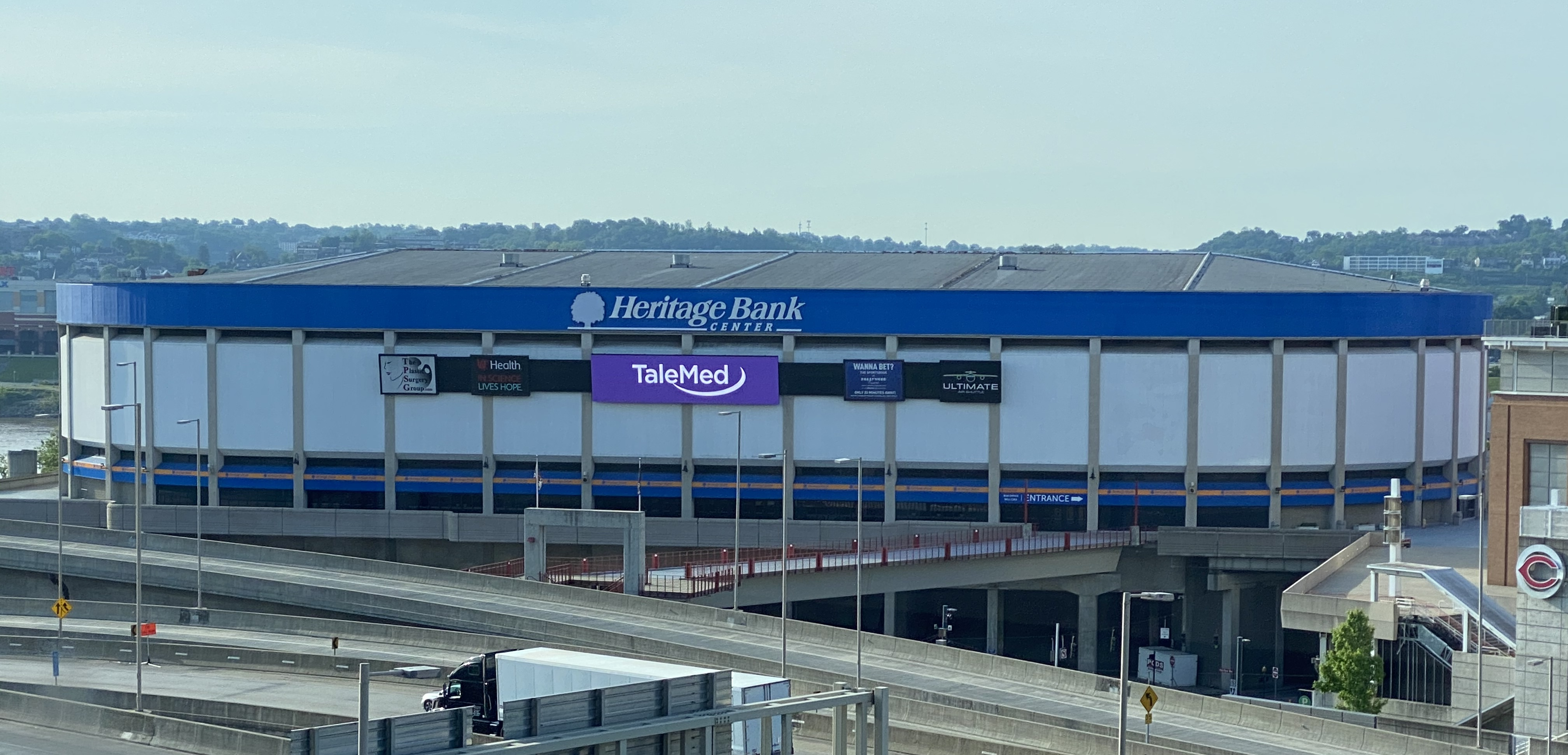
- The venue in 2020

- Location in Ohio Location in the United States
- Former names: Riverfront Coliseum (1975–1997); The Crown (1997–1999); Firstar Center (1999–2002); U.S. Bank Arena (2002–2019)
- Address: 100 Broadway Street
- Location: Cincinnati, Ohio, U.S.
- Coordinates: 39°5′52″N 84°30′16″W
- Owner: Nederlander Entertainment and Anschutz Entertainment Group
- Operator: Nederlander Entertainment
- Capacity: Concert: 17,556; Basketball: 17,000; Ice hockey: 14,453
- Public transit: Connector at The Banks

Construction
- Groundbreaking: November 12, 1973
- Opened: September 9, 1975
- Cost: $20 million ($120 million in 2025 dollars)
- Architects: Pattee Architects, Inc.
- Structural engineer: Clark Engineering Corporation
- General contractor: Universal Contracting Corp.

Tenants
- Cincinnati Stingers (WHA) (1975–1979); Cincinnati Bearcats (NCAA) (1976–1987); Cincinnati Kids (MISL) (1978–1979); Cincinnati Tigers (CHL) (1981–1982); Cincinnati Rockers (AFL) (1992–1993); Cincinnati Silverbacks (NPSL) (1997–1998); Cincinnati Cyclones (ECHL) (1997–2004, 2006–present); Cincinnati Stuff (IBL) (1999–2001); Cincinnati Swarm (AF2) (2003); Cincinnati Marshals (NIFL) (2005–2006); Cincinnati Jungle Kats (AF2) (2007)

Website
- heritagebankcenter.com

Heritage Bank Center is an indoor arena in downtown Cincinnati, adjacent to Great American Ball Park. It was completed in September 1975 and named Riverfront Coliseum because of its placement next to Riverfront Stadium. In 1997, the facility became known as The Crown, and in 1999, it changed its name again to Firstar Center after Firstar Bank assumed naming rights. In 2002, following Firstar's merger with U.S. Bank, the arena took on the name U.S. Bank Arena and kept that name until 2019.

The arena seats 17,556 people and is the largest indoor arena in the Greater Cincinnati region with 346,100 square feet (32,150 m^{2}) of space. The arena underwent a $14 million renovation project in 1997. The current main tenant is the Cincinnati Cyclones of the ECHL.

== History ==
The arena was the home of the Cincinnati Stingers of the World Hockey Association from 1975 to 1979. Since then, the arena has hosted two minor league hockey teams and various concerts, political rallies, tennis tournaments, figure skating, professional wrestling, traveling circus and rodeo shows, and other events. The facility's longest-serving tenant was the Cincinnati Bearcats men's basketball program of the University of Cincinnati, who used the arena from its construction until 1987, when the team moved to Cincinnati Gardens and eventually to the on-campus Fifth Third Arena.

Until the opening of Fifth Third Arena at the University of Cincinnati and Truist Arena at Northern Kentucky University, commencement ceremonies for both schools were held at Heritage Bank Center. On occasion, there have been local pushes for the attraction of another major sports franchise to occupy the arena, possibly a National Basketball Association (NBA) or National Hockey League (NHL) franchise. The Cincinnati Royals moved to Kansas City – Omaha in 1972, and were the last NBA team to call Cincinnati home. The NBA Cleveland Cavaliers have played preseason games at Heritage Bank Center.

In August 2019, it was announced that U.S. Bank would not be renewing its naming rights sponsorship of the arena, which had been in effect since 2002. Kentucky-based Heritage Bank assumed naming rights of the arena on November 4, 2019.

=== Owners ===
- Brian and Albert Heekin (1975–1997)
- Cincinnati Entertainment Associates (1997–2001)
- Nederlander Entertainment (2001–present)
- Anschutz Entertainment Group (2011–present)

== Renovations ==
The arena was renovated in 1997 as part of the facility's purchase that year by a group headed by Doug Kirchhofer, owner of the Cincinnati Cyclones. The renovation cost $14 million and included new seating, improved concourses and restrooms, expanded concession areas, and a new center-hanging video board. As part of the renovation, the building was renamed "The Crown" and the Cyclones, who then played in the International Hockey League, moved from the Cincinnati Gardens.

A $200 million renovation was proposed in 2015 by arena owners Nederlander Entertainment and AEG Facilities. The renovations would include both upgrades to the seating and expansion to increase capacity to 18,500 seats, additional luxury suites and other premium seating, a new exterior facade, new video boards, and a renovation of the exterior concourse. The push for extensive renovations and upgrades came in 2014 after the city ran a bid for the 2016 Republican National Convention, which was unsuccessful due to the lack of adequate hotel rooms and infrastructure in the proximity of the Arena.

In 2017, Nederlander Entertainment announced its intention to tear down and replace the arena if a deal could be made with taxpayers, citing inadequate space and dated '70s aesthetics. This plan came after the Arena was awarded to be a site for the 2022 NCAA Division I men's basketball tournament, contingent upon updates to the venue. However, after little progress was made the NCAA decided in late 2019 to move the site of the games to Indianapolis.

From 2023 to 2025, Nederlander completed a series of modernizing renovations including full replacement of seats in the arena’s lower bowl and installation of an updated LED center-hung scoreboard.

== Sporting events ==
=== Basketball ===
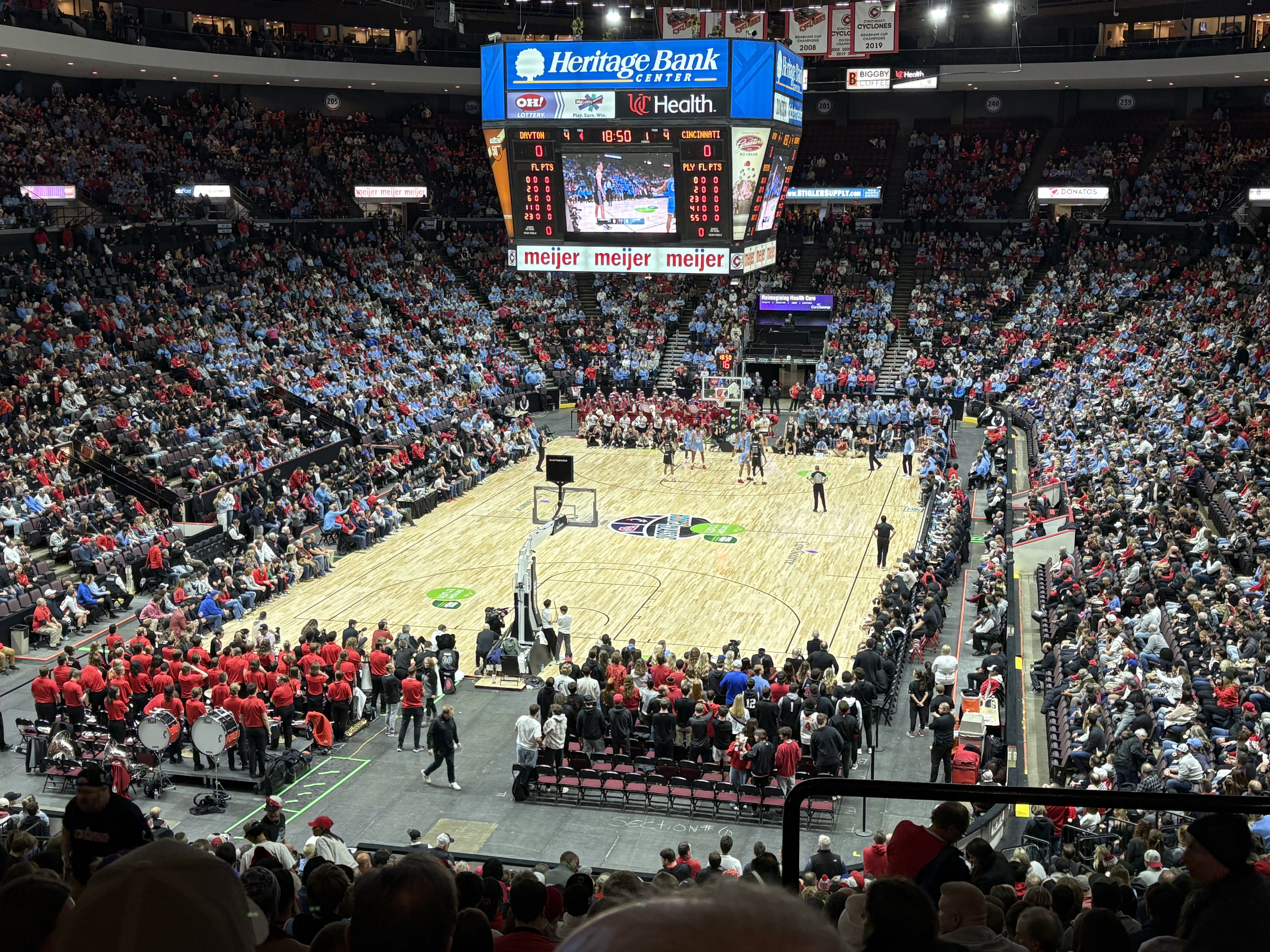
Cincinnati Bearcats vs. Dayton Flyers on December 20, 2024

The Kentucky Colonels of the American Basketball Association played eight games at the newly opened arena for their 1975–1976 season before the team folded due to the ABA–NBA merger following the season.

Cincinnati Bearcats men's basketball utilized Riverfront Coliseum as their home court from 1976 to 1987. During the Bearcats' tenancy the venue hosted the 1978 and 1983 Metro Conference men's basketball tournament.

Additional conference tournaments hosted here was the finals of the 1981 and the entire 1992 Midwestern Collegiate Conference men's basketball tournament as well as the 2005 and 2006 Atlantic 10 men's basketball tournament. In these instances, Xavier served as the host for the conference tournaments.

The 2002 and 2004 Conference USA men's basketball tournament were also hosted at the venue, in these instances with Cincinnati serving as the host for the conference tournaments.

The arena was the site of the Regional of the 1979 NCAA Men's Division I Basketball Tournament and 1987 NCAA Men's Division I Basketball Tournament, as well as a first and second round site for the 1988 NCAA Men's Division I Basketball Tournament and the 1992 NCAA Men's Division I Basketball Tournament. The arena was also host to the 1997 NCAA Division I women's basketball tournament Final Four.

In the aftermath of the 2011 Crosstown Shootout brawl, Cincinnati and Xavier agreed to move the Crosstown Shootout to the arena for the next two seasons. After the 2013 game, the Shootout returned to being played on campus.

==== Regular season college basketball games ====
Heritage Bank Center has hosted dozens of college basketball games as a neutral venue. The colleges which have most frequently played neutral-site games at the venue are Xavier (21 games), Cincinnati (15), Kentucky (11), Miami (OH) (9) Louisville (6), and Dayton (4).

This table does not include regular season games played by Cincinnati, when the team utilized Riverfront Coliseum as their home court from 1976 to 1987.

List of college basketball games at the arena
Date	Home team	Opponent	Score	Attendance
January 17, 1980	Xavier	Marquette	62–76	--
February 20, 1980	Xavier	No. 10 Notre Dame	72–85	--
December 13, 1980	Xavier	Miami (OH)	73–74	--
January 10, 1981	Xavier	Dayton	72–74	3,602
January 26, 1981	Xavier	Marquette	59–78	--
January 28, 1981	Xavier	Oral Roberts	73–69	--
February 14, 1981	Xavier	Loyola	90–89	--
December 30, 1981	Xavier	Texas	71–97	--
January 20, 1982	Xavier	Marquette	50–63	--
January 15, 1983	Xavier	Evansville	85–65	--
February 5, 1983	Xavier	Saint Louis	60–79	--
February 19, 1983	Xavier	Detroit	69–61	--
November 22, 1985	Miami (OH)	Louisville	65–81	--
November 22, 1985	Dayton	Tulsa	60–63^{OT}	10,416
November 24, 1985	Louisville	Tulsa	80–74	--
November 18, 1988	Xavier	No. 4 Louisville	85–83	--
December 23, 1991	Kentucky	Ohio	73–63	15,390
February 8, 1992	Xavier	Louisville	73–86	--
December 17, 1994	No. 6 Kentucky	Texas Tech	83–68	17,153
January 16, 1997	No. 14 Xavier	Tulane	85–87	--
January 16, 1997	No. 4 Cincinnati	Temple	55–70	--
January 22, 1997	No. 3 Kentucky	Vanderbilt	58–46	17,121
November 23, 1998	Kentucky	Wright State	97–75	16,845
December 5, 1998	No. 23 Xavier	No. 14 Purdue	57–71	--
November 29, 1999	Kentucky	Dayton	66–68	17,232
November 21, 2000	Kentucky	Jacksonville State	91–48	10,140
November 28, 2001	No. 13 Kentucky	Kent State	82–68	10,352
December 28, 2002	Miami (OH)	Cincinnati	66–54	14,276
January 4, 2003	No. 20 Kentucky	Ohio	83–75	14,506
December 1, 2003	No. 10 Kentucky	Marshall	89–76	13,913
December 27, 2003	No. 14 Cincinnati	Miami (OH)	83–63	14,873
November 23, 2004	No. 8 Kentucky	Ball State	73–53	15,563
December 27, 2004	No. 22 Cincinnati	Miami (OH)	77–53	15,486
December 28, 2005	Cincinnati	Miami (OH)	77–65	11,786
December 30, 2005	No. 19 Kentucky	Ohio	71–63	16,043
November 24, 2006	Dayton	Louisville	68–64	8,250
December 27, 2006	Cincinnati	Miami (OH)	60–52	9,256
December 29, 2006	Xavier	Illinois	65–59	13,256
January 3, 2007	Xavier	Kansas State	76–66	12,298
December 29, 2007	Cincinnati	Miami (OH)	56–50	--
December 31, 2007	Xavier	Kansas State	103–77	5,233
December 18, 2008	Cincinnati	Mississippi State	75–63	--
December 18, 2008	No. 9 Louisville	Ole Miss	77–68	5,922
February 4, 2009	Cincinnati	Notre Dame	93–83	7,692
December 10, 2009	No. 19 Cincinnati	Miami (OH)	63–59	6,280
November 27, 2010	Cincinnati	Dayton	68–34	6,016
December 29, 2011	Cincinnati	Oklahoma	56–55	4,439
December 19, 2012	No. 11 Cincinnati	Xavier	60–45	14,528
December 14, 2013	Xavier	Cincinnati	64–47	10,250
December 16, 2023	Dayton	Cincinnati	82–68	12,547
December 20, 2024	No. 19 Cincinnati	No. 22 Dayton	66–59	15,107

=== Hockey ===
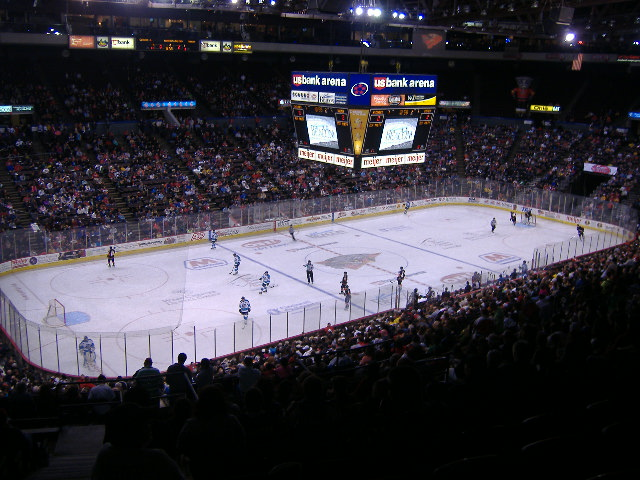
Cincinnati Cyclones vs. Evansville IceMen on March 30, 2013

The first tenant of the arena was the Cincinnati Stingers franchise, which existed from 1975 to 1979 as an expansion team of the World Hockey Association. Despite moderate success, the Stingers did not survive the NHL–WHA merger in 1979 and the team ceased operations. A handful of minor league hockey franchises have called the arena home, with the most successful and longest standing being the Cincinnati Cyclones. As of 2020, the Cyclones are the only active tenant of the venue.

The arena has played host to a handful of college hockey events, including the 1996 NCAA Division I Men's Ice Hockey Tournament Frozen Four, which was won by Michigan. The site also hosted the regional games for the 2014, 2016, and 2017 NCAA Division I Men's Ice Hockey Tournament. In each instance, Miami (OH) served as the host for the regional games.

== Concerts ==
The “Phish” from Vermont played the Coliseum on seven occasions. First on November 14, 1998 when the venue was named “The Crown”. A two night run followed on December 4th and 5th of 1999 while the venue was dubbed “FirstStar Center”. After the first hiatus, the neo-hippie quartet returned for two shows on February 21st and 22nd, much to the delight of the band’s many wook followers. The venue had changed names once again, this time to US Bank Arena. Phish’s final two performances to date occurred after the second hiatus in 2009. November 20th featured a tantalizing version of “Time Turns Elastic”, while the next evening’s setlist featured a 115 show gap bustout of Albuquerque.

The first entertainment event (opening night) to be staged at the facility was a rock concert by The Allman Brothers Band and special guest Muddy Waters on the Win, Lose Or Draw Tour on September 9, 1975, attended by 16,721 persons.

The following year, on October 2, 1976, the Grateful Dead played a two-set show which was officially recorded and released as Dave's Picks Volume 53.

Elvis Presley played two shows (2:30 pm and 8:30 pm) at the Riverfront Coliseum on March 21, 1976. On June 25, 1977, he gave his second-to-last concert here, with 17,140 persons attending.

In 1979, The Bee Gees played two sold-out shows during their Spirits Having Flown Tour.

In 1981, Bruce Springsteen concluded The River Tour on September 13 and 14.

The Grateful Dead came back on April 8, 1989, for their second and last show at the venue. Video of this performance is available on YouTube: https://www.youtube.com//watch?v=H4bd2Dv-xkA.

On March 28, 2010, singer-songwriter Taylor Swift performed a sold-out show at the venue during her Fearless Tour.

Musical duo Twenty One Pilots performed as part of their Bandito Fall Tour on October 22, 2019, then again for The Icy Tour on August 21, 2022.

On October 24, 2019, Canadian singer Celine Dion performed a show during her Courage World Tour. She had performed at the venue previously when the facility was named "The Crown", as part of her Let's Talk About Love Tour, on September 19, 1998.

On August 24, 2022, My Chemical Romance performed a sold-out show at the venue as part of their Reunion Tour.

Multiple other artists and groups have performed at the venue, including Paul McCartney, The Eagles, Elton John, gospel music artist Ron Kenoly, and several performances of Handel's Messiah.

=== 1979 The Who concert deaths ===
On December 3, 1979, 11 teenagers and young adults were killed by compressive asphyxia, and 26 others were injured, during a crowd crush caused by a rush for the best seats before the start of a sold-out concert by English rock band The Who. On that evening, a total of 18,348 ticketed fans were attending, which included 14,770 in general admission seats. The concert was using festival seating, where seats were made available on a first-come, first-served basis. When the fans waiting outside the Coliseum could hear the band conducting a late sound-check, they incorrectly presumed that the concert was beginning without them and tried to break through the still-locked venue doors. Some people (at the very front of the crowd) were either trampled underfoot or squeezed to the point of suffocation while standing, as the crowds pushing from behind were unaware that the doors were still closed. Only a few doors were in operation that night, and there were reports that management did not open more doors due to union restrictions and the concern of people gate-crashing the ticket turnstiles.

As a result, the remaining concerts scheduled for 1979, namely Blue Öyster Cult on December 14 and Aerosmith on December 21, were canceled, and concert venues across North America switched to reserved seating or changed their rules about festival seating. Cincinnati immediately outlawed festival seating at concerts. After establishment of a crowd control task force by Cincinnati mayor Ken Blackwell, the first concert held at the facility after the tragedy was ZZ Top with the Rockets on March 21, 1980, on ZZ Top's Expect No Quarter Tour.

On August 4, 2004, the Cincinnati City Council unanimously overturned the ban on festival seating because it placed the city at a disadvantage for booking concerts. Many music acts prefer festival seating because it can allow the most enthusiastic fans to get near the stage and generate excitement for the rest of the crowd. The city had previously made a one-time exception to the ban, allowing festival seating for a Bruce Springsteen concert on November 12, 2002. Cincinnati was, for a time, the only city in the United States to outlaw festival seating altogether.

== Other events ==
In 1987, the facility hosted the World Figure Skating Championships.

The arena hosted two major professional wrestling pay-per-view events: WCW's Souled Out in 2000 and WWE's Cyber Sunday in 2006.

UFC 77 was held at the arena on October 20, 2007, and was headlined by local fighter Rich Franklin. The UFC returned to the arena for the second time on May 10, 2014, with UFC Fight Night: Brown vs. Silva. The Strikeforce World Grand Prix: Barnett vs. Kharitonov event was held at the arena on September 10, 2011.

On April 17, 2011, the arena hosted Total Nonstop Action Wrestling's Lockdown pay-per-view event.

The arena hosted the opening and closing ceremonies to the 2012 World Choir Games that were held in Cincinnati.

In 2016, the arena hosted the Kellogg's Tour of Gymnastics Champions.

On August 1, 2019, the arena was the location of a rally held by then-President Donald Trump.

The arena hosted All Elite Wrestling's Title Tuesday event on October 18, 2022.

== See also ==
- WKRP in Cincinnati February 11, 1980, episode "In Concert"

Preceded by Malá Sportovní Hala; Prague	Davis Cup; Final Venue; 1981	Succeeded by Palais des Sports; Grenoble
Preceded by Providence Civic Center; Providence, Rhode Island	Host of the Frozen Four; 1996	Succeeded by Bradley Center; Milwaukee
Preceded by Family Arena	Host of Lockdown; 2011	Succeeded by Nashville Municipal Auditorium
