= Michael J. Graham =

Michael J. Graham is an American Jesuit priest and educator who was the president of Xavier University between 2001 and 2021.

== Early life and education ==
Michael Graham was born in Cedar Rapids, Iowa.

Graham graduated from Cornell College with a Bachelor of Science. Additionally, Graham earned a Master of Arts degree in American Studies and psychology, and a doctorate in American Studies from the University of Michigan. Graham was ordained a priest in 1988.

== Career ==
In 1989, Graham became an assistant professor of history at Xavier, and was the director of the university scholars program. In 1994 Graham was appointed vice president for university relations until 1999 when he became executive assistant to President James E. Hoff. In 2001, Graham became the 34th president of Xavier University until retiring on June 30, 2021.
