= Yancy Gates =

American basketball player (born 1989)

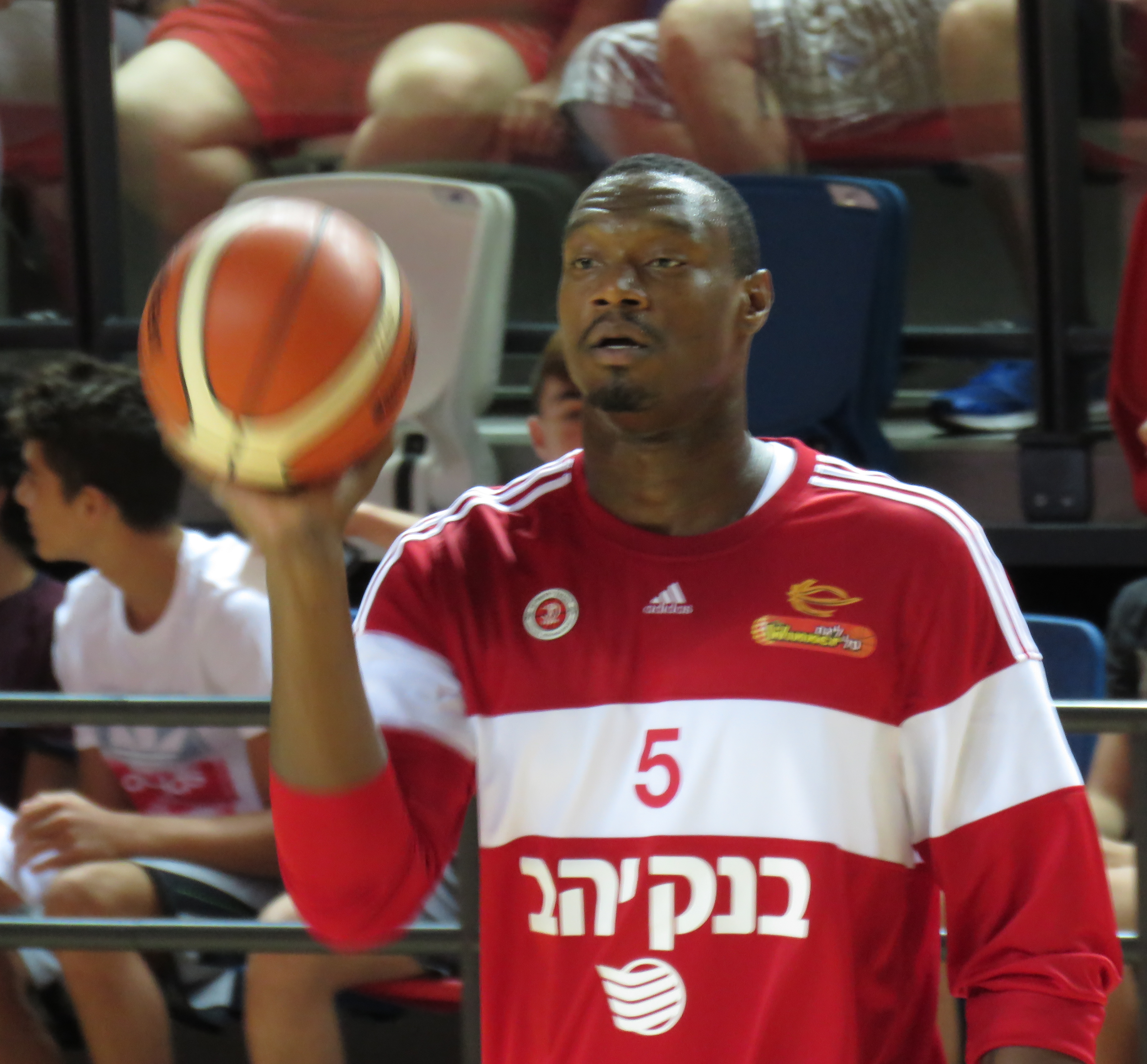

Personal information
- Born: October 15, 1989 (age 37) Cincinnati, Ohio, U.S.
- Listed height: 6 ft 9 in (2.06 m)
- Listed weight: 287 lb (130 kg)

Career information
- High school: Withrow (Cincinnati, Ohio)
- College: Cincinnati (2008–2012)
- NBA draft: 2012: undrafted
- Playing career: 2012–2021
- Position: Power forward / center

Career history
- 2012–2013: Pieno žvaigždės
- 2013: Brujos de Guayama
- 2013–2014: Hapoel Eilat
- 2014–2015: Hapoel Tel Aviv
- 2015: Shanxi Zhongyu
- 2016: Telekom Baskets Bonn
- 2016–2017: Ironi Nahariya
- 2017–2018: Cholet Basket
- 2018: Santeros de Aguada
- 2018–2019: Abejas de León
- 2019: Pieno žvaigždės
- 2019: Stal Ostrów Wielkopolski
- 2019–2020: Petkim Spor
- 2021: Semt77 Yalovaspor
- 2021: Plateros de Fresnillo

Career highlights
- Fourth-team Parade All-American (2008)

Yancy Grayson Gates (born October 15, 1989) is an American former professional basketball player who last played for Plateros de Fresnillo of the Liga Nacional de Baloncesto Profesional. He played college basketball for the University of Cincinnati.

== College career ==
Gates was a highly touted recruit coming out of high school, and he committed to play college basketball for the Cincinnati Bearcats. As a junior, he was suspended for a game due to a confrontation with an assistant coach. As a senior, he was a part of the 2011 Crosstown Shootout brawl, punching Xavier center Kenny Frease. After the brawl, a tearful Gates apologized for his role in the scrum. He was suspended for six games as a result. After the suspension, Gates blossomed, scoring 23 points in an important win over Georgetown and 18 points in a huge upset over the second-ranked Syracuse. He averaged 12.4 points and just under 10 rebounds a game in leading Cincinnati to the Sweet 16 of the 2012 NCAA Tournament.

== Professional career ==
On August 29, 2012, Gates signed with Lithuanian club Pieno žvaigždės for the 2012–13 season. On May 18, 2013, he signed with Brujos de Guayama of Puerto Rico for the rest of the 2013 BSN season.

On July 27, 2013, Gates signed with Hapoel Eilat for the 2013–14 season.

On July 31, 2014, Gates signed with Hapoel Tel Aviv for the 2014–15 season.

On September 3, 2015, Gates signed with Israeli club Hapoel Jerusalem, but left the team in pre-season. In October 2015, he signed with Shanxi Zhongyu of the Chinese Basketball Association. In December 2015, he parted ways with Shanxi after appearing in 18 games. On January 4, 2016, he signed with German club Telekom Baskets Bonn for the rest of the season. On March 6, 2016, he parted ways with Bonn after averaging 14 points and 6 rebounds per game in Beko BBL.

On July 25, 2016, Gates signed with Ironi Nahariya for the 2016–17 season.

On October 31, 2017, Gates signed with Cholet Basket for the rest of the 2017–18 Pro A season.

On August 10, 2019, he has signed with Stal Ostrów Wielkopolski of the PLK. Gates averaged 9.3 points and 7.7 rebounds per game.

On August 8, 2020, Gates signed with Abejas de León in Mexico.

=== The Basketball Tournament (TBT) (2016–present) ===
In the summers of 2016 and 2017, Gates played in The Basketball Tournament on ESPN for Pedro's Posse. He competed for the $2 million prize, and in 2017 for Pedro's Posse, he scored 23 points in their first round loss to Team 23 by a score of 107–92.
