= Crosstown Shootout =

American college basketball rivalry

- Cincinnati Bearcats Xavier Musketeers
- Sport: Men's basketball
- First meeting: 1927; Xavier 29, Cincinnati 25
- Latest meeting: December 5, 2025; Xavier 79, Cincinnati 74
- Next meeting: December 5, 2026

Statistics
- Total meetings: 93
- All-time series: Cincinnati leads 52–41
- Largest victory: Cincinnati: 30 points (1964–65)
- Longest win streak: Cincinnati, 12 (1956–1967)
- Current win streak: Xavier, 1 (2025–present)

Locations of Cincinnati and Xavier

The Crosstown Shootout is an annual men's college basketball game played between the University of Cincinnati Bearcats and Xavier University Musketeers. The two schools are separated by 3 miles (4.8 km) in Cincinnati, making the archrivalry one of the closest major rivalries in the country. The game was first played in 1928, and has been played every year since 1946. In recent years, the game has been sponsored by Skyline Chili.

Throughout its history, the game has been played at six different venues including the Armory Fieldhouse and Fifth Third Arena on the UC campus; and the Schmidt Field House and Cintas Center on the Xavier campus. However, the majority of the games have been played at two other sites—Cincinnati Gardens and Heritage Bank Center. The Gardens has served as the regular home court for both schools at different times, and was even shared by both teams from 1987 to 1989. Heritage Bank Center was UC's home court from 1976 to 1987 when it was known as Riverfront Coliseum.

From 1989 to 2011, the game alternated between the schools' on-campus arenas. After the 2011 Crosstown Shootout brawl at the Cintas Center, the series was moved to Heritage Bank Center as a neutral site for two seasons before resuming as an on-campus series.

== History ==
The history of the Crosstown Shootout dates back to 1928, when the University of Cincinnati helped St. Xavier College dedicate its brand new, $350,000 Schmidt Fieldhouse, which had a capacity of 4,500. Xavier won the game, 29–25, and the two teams didn't meet again until the 1942–43 season. The teams began playing on an annual basis starting in 1945–46, and from 1948 to 1958, they played each other twice a year.

One unique aspect is player and coach Tay Baker, who was a player and longtime assistant at Cincinnati before taking over as Head Coach from 1965 to 1972. After resigning from UC with a 125–60 record, Baker moved across town where he coached Xavier from 1973 to 1979.

The rivalry between Cincinnati and Xavier is regarded as one of the best in the game. The two schools' short distance apart has distinguished it as a proximity rivalry. From 1990 through 2011 and again since 2015, the game alternates between Xavier's and Cincinnati's campus arenas on a yearly basis. ESPN's Jay Bilas was quoted as saying, "Cincinnati and Xavier have created a rivalry that is unparalleled when it comes to outright passion and civic division."

In 1990 a local TV station refused to interrupt their coverage of the Cincinnati–Xavier game for the 1990 State of the Union address.

The game is widely regarded as one of the hottest tickets in Cincinnati every year. The game is also regularly attended by local legends and sports icons Pete Rose and basketball great and former Bearcat Oscar Robertson.

=== 2011 brawl and changes ===
The 2011 game, a 76–53 Xavier victory, was disrupted at the end by a bench-clearing brawl. As a result of this brawl, Cincinnati and Xavier suspended 4 players each for a various number of games. The Cincinnati Enquirer reported on May 22, 2012, that due to the brawl, the game would be held at U.S. Bank Arena for the next two seasons. The continuation of the series beyond the 2013–14 season would depend on the behavior of the players and fans. On June 14, 2012, both schools held a joint press conference at the National Underground Railroad Freedom Center announcing that the annual rivalry will now be called "Skyline Chili Crosstown Classic."

On May 13, 2014, after a two-year series at Heritage Bank Center, the two rivals announced at a joint press conference that they would return to playing their annual men's basketball game on-campus, ditching the moniker of Classic in the process and returning the series to its previous name of the Skyline Crosstown Shootout. The agreement for the alternating home-and-home series was for ten years. The first game of the resumed series was held on February 18, 2015, during ESPN's Rivalry Week when Xavier hosted Cincinnati on December 12, 2015, at the Cintas Center.

=== Crosstown "Tipoff" ===
In 2021 during the coronavirus pandemic fans competed to leave bigger tips for restaurant workers in a "Crosstown tipoff", a nod to the annual shootout, starting with a tip of $1000 on a $54 carryout order at Zip's Cafe in early January 2021 and accompanied by a note reading "Go Xavier!" UC fans responded with tips of increasing size, and fans of both teams bid up the largest tips; by early February $2000 tips were received at a downtown Skyline Chili and an Oakley pub and a $2500 tip was left at a Loveland tavern, all in support of UC. WKRC estimated that by early February there had been more than $25,000 in tips over $1000, along with many tips over $100, in support of both teams.

== Notable games ==
Men's Basketball Comparison
	Cincinnati	Xavier
First Season	1901	1920
NCAA Championships	2	0
NCAA Final Fours	6	0
NCAA Tournament Appearances	33	28
Conference Championships	29	18
Conference Tournament Championships	12	10
All-Americans	44	20
Consensus 1st Team All-Americans	8	1
Player of the Year	3	1
Conference Player of the Year	10	9

February 27, 1946: Despite two prior meetings, this matchup marked the "official" start to the annualized series that would take the city by storm. The Bearcats would emerge victorious, 53–39.

March 1, 1962: The reigning NCAA champion Bearcats came into the game at the Cincinnati Gardens confident against the Musketeers. Cincinnati would hold a series of leads, but Xavier would continue to fight back led by Billy Kirvin. With an eleven-point lead and 2:06 remaining, the Bearcats gave up nine points to Xavier, but time prevented the upset and Cincinnati won 61–58.

February 26, 1963: After the No. 1 Bearcats defeated Xavier 72–61, Bearcat center George Wilson was hit with a thrown cowbell while exiting the court.

March 4, 1964: A series-high 45 points were scored by Xavier's Steve Thomas in a losing effort as Cincinnati defeated Xavier 94–92.

March 3, 1967: The 1966 overtime contest—the last of 12 straight Cincinnati wins—resulted in 57 fouls and saw Musketeer Joe Pangrazio grab a crutch from a fan in the stands so he could throw it at Bearcat Raleigh Wynn.

January 23, 1986: In what was a typically close and heated contest, Xavier would win 80–76. During the game Cincinnati player Myron Hughes punched Xavier's Eddie Johnson, knocking him to the ground. However, the punch was away from the action and no foul was called.

January 29, 1992: Cincinnati's Terry Nelson proclaimed that the Bearcats would win a "blowout", making newspaper headlines. Anthony Buford and the Final Four bound Cincinnati proved Nelson's words winning 93–75.

January 19, 1994: After a hard-fought 82–76 overtime win for Xavier, Cincinnati head coach Bob Huggins refused to shake his XU counterpart Pete Gillen's hand post-game and instead verbally confronted him, causing much controversy. This was to be Gillen's final Crosstown Shootout as he left Xavier after the season to take the head coaching job at Providence.

November 26, 1996: The Cincinnati Bearcats were ranked #1 in the country and were largely considered frontrunners for the national championship by several media outlets, including Sports Illustrated. Xavier's Lenny Brown made a running one-hander at the buzzer to propel Xavier to a 71–69 win.

December 18, 1999: Again the Bearcats were ranked #1 in the country. And again Xavier defeated Cincinnati 66–64 in the final moments of the game.

February 3, 2004: Xavier came into the game a huge underdog against #10 Cincinnati, but pulled off the upset over the Bearcats 71–69 at the Cintas Center. This would lead Xavier on a 16-2 stretch the rest of the season, culminating in the program's first ever appearance in the Elite 8.

December 10, 2011: Xavier, ranked #8 in the country, handily beat the Bearcats 76–53, but the focus of the game was the bench-clearing brawl that resulted in the game ending with 9.4 seconds left and the subsequent suspensions of four Bearcat players and four Musketeer players.

December 19, 2012: The newly renamed "Crosstown Classic" was played at Heritage Bank Center for the first time since the brawl in 2011. After a back and forth 1st half, the #11 Bearcats dominated in the second half, soundly defeating Xavier 60–45 to improve to 11–0.

January 26, 2017: Xavier came to Fifth Third Arena searching for a record 4th straight win in the series. Trevon Bluiett would contribute 40 points, but No. 19 Cincinnati and 21 points from Jacob Evans would outlast No. 24 Xavier 86–78.

== Results ==
Rankings are from the AP Poll (1936–present)

Cincinnati victories	Xavier victories	Tie games

No.	Date	Location	Winner	Score
1	March 7, 1928	Schmidt Field House	Xavier	29–25
2	March 3, 1943	Schmidt Field House	Xavier	51–37
3	February 27, 1946	Schmidt Field House	Cincinnati	53–39
4	February 26, 1947	Schmidt Field House	Cincinnati	76–51
5	March 3, 1948	Schmidt Field House	Cincinnati	52–45
6	February 5, 1949	Schmidt Field House	Xavier	71–64
7	March 9, 1949	Cincinnati Gardens	Cincinnati	57–46
8	March 9, 1950	Cincinnati Gardens	Xavier	54–53
9	March 18, 1950	Cincinnati Gardens	Cincinnati	59–48
10	December 28, 1950	Cincinnati Gardens	No. 17 Cincinnati	83–70
11	March 8, 1951	Cincinnati Gardens	No. 17 Cincinnati	81–66
12	December 29, 1951	Cincinnati Gardens	Xavier	77–70
13	February 13, 1952	Cincinnati Gardens	Cincinnati	68–63
14	January 6, 1953	Cincinnati Gardens	Xavier	81–78
15	February 10, 1953	Cincinnati Gardens	Xavier	70–68
16	January 6, 1954	Cincinnati Gardens	Cincinnati	77–58
17	February 10, 1954	Cincinnati Gardens	Cincinnati	81–76
18	January 6, 1955	Cincinnati Gardens	Xavier	67–64
19	February 9, 1955	Armory Fieldhouse	No. 17 Cincinnati	70–69
20	January 17, 1956	Cincinnati Gardens	Cincinnati	71–66
21	February 8, 1956	Armory Fieldhouse	Xavier	79–72^{OT}
22	January 9, 1957	Cincinnati Gardens	Xavier	88–62
23	February 13, 1957	Armory Fieldhouse	Cincinnati	69–57
24	December 14, 1957	Armory Fieldhouse	No. 19 Cincinnati	79–68
25	March 8, 1958	Cincinnati Gardens	No. 3 Cincinnati	80–68
26	January 24, 1959	Cincinnati Gardens	No. 6 Cincinnati	92–66
27	March 8, 1960	Cincinnati Gardens	No. 1 Cincinnati	85–68
28	March 2, 1961	Cincinnati Gardens	No. 3 Cincinnati	89–53
29	March 1, 1962	Cincinnati Gardens	No. 2 Cincinnati	61–58
30	February 26, 1963	Cincinnati Gardens	No. 1 Cincinnati	72–61
31	March 4, 1964	Cincinnati Gardens	Cincinnati	94–92
32	March 3, 1965	Cincinnati Gardens	Cincinnati	102–72
33	March 3, 1966	Cincinnati Gardens	No. 10 Cincinnati	67–62
34	March 3, 1967	Cincinnati Gardens	Cincinnati	79–69^{OT}
35	March 5, 1968	Cincinnati Gardens	Xavier	72–71
36	January 8, 1969	Cincinnati Gardens	No. 19 Cincinnati	52–50
37	February 17, 1970	Cincinnati Gardens	Cincinnati	85–72
38	February 17, 1971	Cincinnati Gardens	Xavier	66–65
39	February 16, 1972	Cincinnati Gardens	Cincinnati	76–71
40	February 21, 1973	Cincinnati Gardens	Cincinnati	78–68
41	February 20, 1974	Cincinnati Gardens	Cincinnati	78–68
42	February 26, 1975	Cincinnati Gardens	Cincinnati	66–57
43	February 18, 1976	Riverfront Coliseum	No. 13 Cincinnati	81–74
44	February 16, 1977	Riverfront Coliseum	No. 10 Cincinnati	77–68
45	February 13, 1978	Riverfront Coliseum	Cincinnati	59–54
46	February 12, 1979	Riverfront Coliseum	Cincinnati	60–58
47	February 4, 1980	Riverfront Coliseum	Xavier	77–69
48	February 18, 1981	Riverfront Coliseum	Cincinnati	79–72

No.	Date	Location	Winner	Score
49	January 27, 1982	Riverfront Coliseum	Xavier	53–51
50	January 26, 1983	Riverfront Coliseum	Cincinnati	73–58
51	January 26, 1984	Cincinnati Gardens	Xavier	72–63
52	January 30, 1985	Riverfront Coliseum	Xavier	55–52
53	January 23, 1986	Cincinnati Gardens	Xavier	80–76
54	January 29, 1987	Riverfront Coliseum	Cincinnati	75–73
55	January 12, 1988	Cincinnati Gardens	Xavier	98–80
56	February 1, 1989	Cincinnati Gardens	Cincinnati	86–76
57	January 31, 1990	Cincinnati Gardens	No. 23 Xavier	90–88^{OT}
58	January 30, 1991	Shoemaker Center	Cincinnati	69–56
59	January 29, 1992	Cincinnati Gardens	Cincinnati	93–75
60	January 27, 1993	Shoemaker Center	No. 4 Cincinnati	78–67
61	January 19, 1994	Cincinnati Gardens	No. 22 Xavier	82–76^{OT}
62	January 9, 1995	Shoemaker Center	Cincinnati	87–80
63	January 17, 1996	Cincinnati Gardens	No. 3 Cincinnati	99–90
64	November 26, 1996	Shoemaker Center	Xavier	71–69
65	December 13, 1997	Cincinnati Gardens	No. 7 Xavier	88–68
66	January 28, 1999	Shoemaker Center	No. 5 Cincinnati	87–77
67	December 18, 1999	Cincinnati Gardens	Xavier	66–64
68	December 14, 2000	Shoemaker Center	Xavier	69–67
69	December 14, 2001	Cintas Center	Cincinnati	75–55
70	December 7, 2002	Shoemaker Center	No. 16 Xavier	50–44
71	February 3, 2004	Cintas Center	Xavier	71–69
72	February 10, 2005	Shoemaker Center	No. 21 Cincinnati	65–54
73	January 19, 2006	Cintas Center	Xavier	73–71^{OT}
74	December 13, 2006	Fifth Third Arena	Cincinnati	67–55
75	December 12, 2007	Cintas Center	No. 17 Xavier	64–59
76	December 13, 2008	Fifth Third Arena	No. 10 Xavier	76–66
77	December 13, 2009	Cintas Center	Xavier	83–79^{2OT}
78	January 6, 2011	Fifth Third Arena	No. 24 Cincinnati	66–46
79	December 10, 2011	Cintas Center	No. 8 Xavier	76–53
80	December 19, 2012	U.S. Bank Arena	No. 11 Cincinnati	60–45
81	December 14, 2013	U.S. Bank Arena	Xavier	64–47
82	February 18, 2015	Fifth Third Arena	Xavier	59–57
83	December 12, 2015	Cintas Center	No. 12 Xavier	65–55
84	January 26, 2017	Fifth Third Arena	No. 19 Cincinnati	86–78
85	December 2, 2017	Cintas Center	No. 21 Xavier	89–76
86	December 8, 2018	Fifth Third Arena	Cincinnati	62–47
87	December 7, 2019	Cintas Center	Xavier	73–66
88	December 6, 2020	Fifth Third Arena	Xavier	77–69
89	December 11, 2021	Cintas Center	Xavier	83–63
90	December 10, 2022	Fifth Third Arena	Xavier	80–77
91	December 9, 2023	Cintas Center	Xavier	84–79
92	December 14, 2024	Fifth Third Arena	No. 22 Cincinnati	68–65
93	December 5, 2025	Cintas Center	Xavier	79–74
94	December 5, 2026	Fifth Third Arena		
Series: Cincinnati leads 52–41

=== Wins by venue ===
Category	Cincinnati	Xavier
Schmidt Field House	3	3
Cincinnati Gardens	28	15
Armory Fieldhouse	3	1
Riverfront Coliseum; US Bank Arena	8	4
Shoemaker Center; Fifth Third Arena	10	7
Cintas Center	1	11
