= 2011–12 Big East Conference men's basketball season =

- League: NCAA Division I
- Sport: Basketball
- Duration: December 27, 2011 through March 3, 2012
- Teams: 16
- Total attendance: 2,943,956
- Average attendance: 10,823
- TV partner(s): Big East Network, ESPN

Regular Season
- Champion: Marquette (14–4)
- Season MVP: Jae Crowder (MARQ)

Tournament
- Champions: Louisville
- Runners-up: Cincinnati
- Finals MVP: Peyton Siva (LOU)

Big East Conference men's basketball seasons
- ← 2010–11 2012–13 →

2011–12 Big East men's basketball standings
	Conf.				Overall
Team	W		L	PCT	W		L	PCT
No. 11 Marquette	14	–	4	.778	27	–	8	.771
Notre Dame	13	–	5	.722	22	–	12	.647
Cincinnati	12	–	6	.667	26	–	11	.703
No. 15 Georgetown	12	–	6	.667	24	–	9	.727
South Florida	12	–	6	.667	22	–	14	.611
West Virginia	9	–	9	.500	19	–	14	.576
Connecticut	8	–	10	.444	20	–	14	.588
Seton Hall	8	–	10	.444	21	–	13	.618
Rutgers	6	–	12	.333	14	–	18	.438
St. John's	6	–	12	.333	13	–	19	.406
Pittsburgh	5	–	13	.278	22	–	17	.564
Villanova	5	–	13	.278	13	–	19	.406
Providence	4	–	14	.222	15	–	17	.469
DePaul	3	–	15	.167	12	–	19	.387
*No. 2 Syracuse	0	–	1	.000	0	–	3	.000
**No. 17 Louisville†	0	–	8	.000	0	–	10	.000
† 2012 Big East tournament winner As of March 31, 2012; *Syracuse: 30 reg. season games, 4 postseason games vacated due to sanctions against the program; Disputed record: Syracuse–(34–3)(17–1) **Louisville: 25 reg. season games, 5 postseason games vacated due to sanctions against the program; Disputed record: Louisville–(30-10)(10-8); Rankings from AP Poll

The 2011–12 Big East Conference men's basketball season was the 33rd season of competitive basketball played by the Big East Conference, since its inception in 1979, and involved its 16 full-time member schools. The season officially opened on December 27, 2011, when Notre Dame defeated Pittsburgh, 72–59, and St. John's defeated Providence, 91–67, and ended on March 3, 2012, with a 61–58 victory for Rutgers over St. John's.

Marquette captured the first of two consecutive regular season titles after Syracuse was forced to vacate 9 wins from the 2011-2012 season, and third outright, with a conference win–loss record of 17–1, which tied Connecticut in 1995–96 for most regular season conference wins in conference history. The Orange also received the no. 1 seed in the Big East tournament, and a bye into the quarterfinals, along with 2nd-seed Marquette, 3rd-seed Notre Dame, and 4th-seed Cincinnati. Georgetown, South Florida, Louisville, and West Virginia rounded out the top eight, and all received a bye into the tournament's second round. Play began at noon on Tuesday, March 6 in Madison Square Garden, when 9th-seed Connecticut defeated 16th-seed DePaul, 81–67. Play ended on Saturday, March 10, when Louisville defeated Cincinnati, 50–44, for their second Big East Championship.

The Big East led all conferences in having nine teams selected to the 2012 NCAA Men's Division I Basketball Tournament.

The 2011–12 season marked the Big East's seventh and final season as a 16-team basketball league, with the departure of West Virginia to the Big 12 Conference for the 2012–13 season.

== Preseason ==
=== Coaching changes ===
Prior to the start of the 2011–12 season, one Big East program hired a new coach, following the dismissal or resignation of their former coach:

- Providence: After three seasons, Providence fired Keno Davis on March 11, 2011, despite five years remaining on Davis' contract. After an NIT berth in 2008–09, Davis' squad finished 15th and 14th in the conference in 2009–10 and 2010–11, respectively. Davis finished with a 46–50 (.479) overall record and 18–36 (.333) conference record. He was replaced with Fairfield head coach and Providence native Ed Cooley on March 22, 2011.

=== Conference predictions ===
At Big East media day on October 19, the conference released their predictions for standings and All-Big East teams.

=== Predicted Big East results ===
	Big East Coaches	Big East Writers	Rivals.com
T-1.	Connecticut (7*)	Syracuse (6)	Connecticut
T-1.	Syracuse (5)	Connecticut (8)	Syracuse
3.	Louisville (3)	Louisville (2)	Pittsburgh
4.	Pittsburgh (1)	Pittsburgh	Marquette
5.	Cincinnati	Marquette	Louisville
6.	Marquette	Cincinnati	Cincinnati
7.	West Virginia	West Virginia	West Virginia
8.	Villanova	Villanova	Villanova
9.	Notre Dame	Notre Dame	Notre Dame
10.	Georgetown	Georgetown	Georgetown
11.	Rutgers	Rutgers	Rutgers
12.	St. John's	St. John's	DePaul
13.	Seton Hall	Seton Hall	Seton Hall
14.	South Florida	South Florida	St. John's
15.	Providence	DePaul	Providence
16.	DePaul	Providence	South Florida
	*first place votes		

=== Preseason All-Big East teams ===
First Team	Second Team	Honorable Mention
Ashton Gibbs, G., PITT; Jeremy Lamb, G., CONN; Darius Johnson-Odom, G., MARQ; Tim Abromaitis, F., ND; Kris Joseph, F., SYR; Kevin Jones, F., WVU	Yancy Gates, F., CIN; Alex Oriakhi, F., CONN; Peyton Siva, G., LOU; Scoop Jardine, G., SYR; Maalik Wayns, G., VILL	Andre Drummond, C., CONN; Shabazz Napier, G., CONN; Cleveland Melvin, F., DEP; Jae Crowder, F., MARQ; Augustus Gilchrist, F., USF

Big East Preseason Player of the Year: Ashton Gibbs, G., Pittsburgh
Big East Preseason Rookie of the Year: Andre Drummond, C., Connecticut

=== Preseason national polls ===
	AP	Coaches	Athlon	Lindy's	Sporting News	Fox Sports	CBS Sports	Rivals.com	Blue Ribbon
Cincinnati	22	21	18		17	21	16	23	
Connecticut	4	4	4	8	4	4	3	3	5
DePaul									
Georgetown									
Louisville	8	9	8	12	16	9	8	16	13
Marquette	21	22	17		21	22		14	22
Notre Dame	RV								
Pittsburgh	11	10	10	6	11	10	10	9	8
Providence									
Rutgers									
St. John's	RV								
Seton Hall									
South Florida									
Syracuse	5	5	5	9	6	5	4	6	4
Villanova	RV	RV					25		
West Virginia	RV	RV							

=== Watchlists ===
On October 3, the Wooden Award preseason watch list included ten Big East players. The watchlist was composed of 50 players who were not transfers, freshmen or medical redshirts. On November 7, the Naismith College Player of the Year watchlist of 50 players was announced, which included nine Big East names.

	Wooden	Naismith
Tim Abromaitis, ND	✓	✓
Andre Drummond, CONN		✓
Ashton Gibbs, PITT	✓	✓
Scoop Jardine, SYR	✓	
Darius Johnson-Odom, MARQ	✓	✓
Kevin Jones, WVU	✓	✓
Kris Joseph, SYR	✓	✓
Jeremy Lamb, CONN	✓	✓
Alex Oriakhi, CONN	✓	✓
Peyton Siva, LOU	✓	✓
Maalik Wayns, VILL	✓	

== Regular season ==
=== Season summary & highlights ===
- Syracuse won the NIT Season Tip-Off, defeating Stanford in the finals, 69–63.
- Marquette won the Paradise Jam Tournament, defeating Norfolk State in the finals, 59–57.
- On November 11, Louisville head coach Rick Pitino recorded his 600th career win in an 83–48 victory over Tennessee–Martin. He became the 15th fastest coach to do so (38th overall).
- On November 27, Syracuse fired associate head coach Bernie Fine, who had been an assistant under head coach Jim Boeheim since 1976, after Fine was alleged to have sexually abused team ball boys decades prior.
- Connecticut head coach Jim Calhoun was suspended for the first three games of the Big East regular season, following NCAA sanctions in February 2011 for recruiting violations. Under associate head coach George Blaney, the Huskies went 2–1 to start their conference schedule.
- On February 3, Calhoun took his second medical leave of absence in three seasons, eventually undergoing surgery on February 27 for spinal stenosis. The Huskies went 3–5 under Blaney before Calhoun returned to coach in the regular season finale.
- With 30 regular season wins, Syracuse set a school record, eclipsing the mark of 28 regular season wins set in 2009–10. With a 17–1 conference record, the Orange tied the 1995–96 Connecticut squad, which also went 17–1, for conference wins. They also became the first team in Big East history with just one regular season loss overall (January 21 at Notre Dame, 67–58). Syracuse was also unbeaten at home in the Carrier Dome, for the second time in school history (2002–03).

=== Midseason watchlists ===
On January 17, the Wooden Award midseason watchlist was released, and included four Big East players. The list was composed of 25 players, reduced from the preseason list of 50. There were no newcomers to the list from the preseason. In addition, seven Big East players who were on the preseason list did not appear at midseason: Tim Abromaitis, Andre Drummond, Ashton Gibbs, Scoop Jardine, Alex Oriakhi, Peyton Siva, and Maalik Wayns. On February 29, the Naismith Top 30 was announced, and included newcomer Syracuse guard Dion Waiters. Meanwhile, Abromaitis, Drummond, Gibbs, Jeremy Lamb, Oriakhi, and Siva, who were on the preseason list, did not appear at midseason.

	Wooden	Naismith
Darius Johnson-Odom, MARQ	✓	✓
Kevin Jones, WVU	✓	✓
Kris Joseph, SYR	✓	✓
Jeremy Lamb, CONN	✓	
Dion Waiters, SYR		✓

=== Composite matrix ===
This table summarizes the head-to-head results between teams in conference play.

	Cincinnati	Connecticut	DePaul	Georgetown	Louisville	Marquette	Notre Dame	Pittsburgh	Providence	Rutgers	St. John's	Seton Hall	South Florida	Syracuse	Villanova	West Virginia
vs. Cincinnati	–	0–1	0–1	0–1	0–1	1–1	0–1	0–1	0–1	1–0	1–1	0–1	1–0	1–0	0–2	1–0
vs. Connecticut	1–0	–	0–1	1–0	1–0	1–0	1–1	0–1	1–0	1–0	0–1	1–1	0–1	2–0	0–1	0–1
vs. DePaul	1–0	1–0	–	1–0	2–0	1–0	1–0	0–1	1–0	0–1	2–0	1–1	1–0	1–0	1–0	1–0
vs. Georgetown	1–0	0–1	0–1	–	0–1	1–1	0–1	1–0	0–2	0–1	0–2	1–0	0–1	1–0	0–1	1–0
vs. Louisville	1–0	0–1	0–2	1–0	–	1–0	1–0	0–2	1–0	0–1	0–1	0–1	1–0	2–0	0–1	0–1
vs. Marquette	1–1	0–1	0–1	1–1	0–1	–	1–0	0–1	0–1	0–1	0–1	0–1	0–1	1–0	0–2	0–1
vs. Notre Dame	1–0	1–1	0–1	1–0	0–1	0–1	–	0–1	0–1	1–1	1-0	0-1	0–1	0–1	0–1	0–2
vs. Pittsburgh	1–0	1–0	1–0	0–1	2–0	1–0	1–0	–	0–1	1–0	0–1	1–0	2–0	1–0	0–1	1–1
vs. Providence	1–0	0–1	0–1	2–0	0–1	1–0	1–0	1–0	–	0–1	1–0	1–0	2–0	2–0	1–0	1–0
vs. Rutgers	0–1	0–1	1–0	1–0	1–0	1–0	1-1	0–1	1–0	–	0–1	1–1	1–0	1–0	1–0	2–0
vs. St. John's	1–1	1–0	0–2	2–0	1–0	1–0	0–1	1–0	0–1	1–0	–	1–0	1–0	1–0	1–0	0–1
vs. Seton Hall	1–0	1–1	1–1	0–1	1–0	1–0	1–0	0–1	0–1	1–1	0–1	–	1–0	1–0	1–0	0–1
vs. South Florida	0–1	1–0	0–1	1–0	0–1	1–0	1–0	0–2	0–2	0–1	0–1	0–1	–	1–0	0–2	1–0
vs. Syracuse	0–1	0–2	0–1	0–1	0–2	0–1	1–0	0–1	0–2	0–1	0–1	0–1	0–1	–	0–1	0–1
vs. Villanova	2–0	1–0	0–1	1–0	1–0	2–0	1–0	1–0	0–1	0–1	0–1	0–1	2–0	1–0	–	1–0
vs. West Virginia	0–1	1–0	0–1	0–1	1–0	1–0	2–0	1–1	0–1	0–2	1–0	1–0	0–1	1–0	0–1	–
Total	12–6	8–10	3–15	12–6	10–8	14–4	13–5	5–13	4–14	6–12	6–12	8–10	12–6	17–1	5–13	9–9

=== Statistical leaders ===
The regular season team, individual, and attendance figures include all conference and non-conference games played from November 7, 2011 through March 3, 2012.

==== Team ====
Scoring Offense
Rk	Team	Games	Points	PPG
1	Marquette	31	2359	76.1
2	Syracuse	31	2335	75.3
3	DePaul	30	2231	74.4
4	West Virginia	31	2225	71.8
5	Villanova	30	2149	71.6

Scoring Defense
Rk	Team	Games	Points	PPG
1	South Florida	31	1773	57.2
2	Georgetown	29	1710	59.0
3	Syracuse	31	1867	60.2
4	Cincinnati	31	1892	61.0
5	Notre Dame	31	1913	61.7

Scoring Margin
Rk	Team	Offense	Defense	Margin
1	Syracuse	75.3	60.2	+15.1
2	Marquette	76.1	65.6	+10.5
3	Georgetown	69.2	59.0	+10.2
4	Cincinnati	69.1	61.0	+8.1
5	Louisville	69.4	62.0	+7.4

Free throw percentage
Rk	Team	FTM	FTA	Pct
1	Villanova	514	678	.758
2	Marquette	543	750	.724
3	Notre Dame	447	626	.714
4	Pittsburgh	389	551	.706
5	Providence	488	692	.705

Field goal percentage
Rk	Team	FGM	FGA	Pct
1	Syracuse	866	1844	.470
2	Georgetown	711	1542	.461
3	Marquette	818	1779	.460
4	Connecticut	759	1671	.454
5	Pittsburgh	783	1730	.453

3-Pt Field goal percentage
Rk	Team	3FGM	3FGA	Pct
1	Seton Hall	213	588	.362
2	Providence	154	426	.362
3	Georgetown	167	476	.351
4	Cincinnati	228	652	.350
5	Syracuse	195	568	.343

Rebounding Margin
Rk	Team	Avg	Opp Avg	Marg
1	Pittsburgh	36.9	29.1	+7.7
2	West Virginia	38.1	31.6	+6.5
3	Georgetown	36.1	30.6	+5.6
4	Villanova	39.5	34.9	+4.6
5	Connecticut	37.7	34.1	+3.5

Offensive Rebounds
Rk	Team	Games	No.	Avg/G
1	West Virginia	31	454	14.7
2	Pittsburgh	31	443	14.3
3	Villanova	30	417	13.9
4	Cincinnati	31	419	13.5
5	Louisville	31	413	13.3

Defensive Rebounds
Rk	Team	Games	No.	Avg/G
1	Villanova	30	767	25.6
2	Connecticut	30	760	25.3
3	Louisville	31	780	25.2
4	Georgetown	29	714	24.6
5	Providence	31	755	24.4

Blocks
Rk	Team	Games	No.	Avg/G
1	Syracuse	31	225	7.3
2	Connecticut	30	201	6.7
3	Providence	31	163	5.3
4	Louisville	31	147	4.7
5	Georgetown	29	137	4.7

Assists
Rk	Team	Games	No.	Avg/G
1	Marquette	31	528	17.0
2	Syracuse	31	496	16.0
3	DePaul	30	463	15.4
4	Pittsburgh	31	468	15.1
5	West Virginia	31	459	14.8

Steals
Rk	Team	Games	No.	Avg/G
1	Syracuse	31	302	9.7
2	Louisville	31	286	9.2
3	Marquette	31	282	8.8
4	Seton Hall	30	258	8.6
5	Rutgers	31	255	8.2

==== Individual ====
Scoring
Rk	Name	GP	Pts	Avg/G
1	Kevin Jones, WVU	31	619	20.0
2	Darius Johnson-Odom, MARQ	30	549	18.3
3	Jae Crowder, MARQ	31	547	17.6
4	Jeremy Lamb, CONN	30	527	17.6
5	Maalik Wayns, VILL	27	473	17.5

Rebounding
Rk	Name	GP	Reb	Avg/G
1	Kevin Jones, WVU	31	346	11.2
2	Herb Pope, HALL	29	298	10.3
3	Yancy Gates, CIN	25	236	9.4
4	Jack Cooley, ND	30	276	9.2
5	Gorgui Dieng, LOU	31	283	9.1

Assists
Rk	Name	GP	No.	Avg/G
1	Vincent Council, PROV	30	226	7.5
2	Jordan Theodore, HALL	30	200	6.7
3	Shabazz Napier, CONN	30	177	5.9
4	Junior Cadougan, MARQ	30	164	5.5
5	Peyton Siva, LOU	29	157	5.4

Steals
Rk	Name	GP	No.	Avg/G
1	Fuquan Edwin, HALL	30	92	3.1
2	Jae Crowder, MARQ	31	75	2.4
3	Russ Smith, LOU	30	69	2.3
4	Cashmere Wright, CIN	31	61	2.0
5	Dion Waiters, SYR	31	59	1.9

Blocks
Rk	Name	GP	No.	Avg/G
1	Gorgui Dieng, LOU	31	98	3.2
2	Fab Melo, SYR	28	87	3.1
3	Andre Drummond, CONN	30	79	2.6
4	Dane Miller, RUT	31	51	1.6
5	Herb Pope, HALL	29	46	1.6

Field Goals
Rk	Name	FGM	FGA	PCT
1	Jack Cooley, ND	141	227	.621
2	Fab Melo, SYR	90	158	.570
3	Nasir Robinson, PITT	146	260	.562
4	God'sgift Achiuwa, SJU	109	196	.556
5	Andre Drummond, CONN	140	262	.534

3-Pt Field Goals
Rk	Name	3PM	3PA	PCT
1	Hollis Thompson, GTWN	54	118	.458
2	Lamar Patterson, PITT	32	77	.416
3	Toarlyn Fitzpatrick, USF	36	87	.414
4	LaDontae Henton, PROV	43	107	.402
5	Darius Johnson-Odom, MARQ	69	172	.401

Free Throws
Rk	Name	FTM	FTA	PCT
1	Bryce Cotton, PROV	86	96	.896
2	Maalik Wayns, VILL	125	140	.893
3	Anthony Collins, USF	54	63	.857
4	Ashton Gibbs, PITT	83	97	.856
5	Jeremy Lamb, CONN	90	109	.826

==== Attendance ====
Rk	Team	Home Gms.	Home Att.	Avg. Home	Away Gms.	Away Att.	Avg. Away	Neut. Gms.	Neut. Att.	Avg. Neut.	Total Gms.	Total Att.	Avg.
1	Syracuse	19	448,736	23,618	10	141,933	14,193	2	16,770	8,385	31	607,439	19,595
2	Louisville	20	430,052	21,503	11	160,957	14,632	0	0	0	31	591,009	19,065
3	Marquette	16	242,205	15,138	11	145,954	13,269	4	17,066	4,266	31	405,225	13,072
4	Connecticut	17	214,873	12,640	10	146,339	14,634	3	5,146	1,715	30	366,358	12,212
5	Pittsburgh	18	182,968	10,165	11	142,781	12,980	2	32,926	16,463	31	358,675	11,570
6	Georgetown	16	180,530	11,283	10	147,312	14,731	3	7,200	2,400	29	335,042	11,553
7	West Virginia	16	158,887	9,930	10	111,890	11,189	5	40,882	8,176	31	311,659	10,054
8	Notre Dame	17	135,975	7,999	10	121,025	12,102	4	41,214	13,738*	31	298,214	9,940*
9	Villanova	15	133,839	8,923	11	125,039	11,367	4	9,658	4,829**	30	268,536	9,591**
10	St. John's	17	133,129	7,831	12	125,713	10,476	2	9,036	9,036†	31	267,878	8,929†
11	Cincinnati	18	145,235	8,069	12	115,055	9,588	1	4,439	4,439	31	264,729	8,540
12	Seton Hall	16	121,587	7,599	11	114,796	10,436	3	6,504	3,252‡	30	242,887	8,375‡
13	Providence	17	134,007	7,883	12	108,950	9,079	2	1,375	688	31	244,332	7,882
14	DePaul	16	123,832	7,740	11	89,353	8,123	3	8,275	2,758	30	221,460	7,382
15	South Florida	16	61,590	3,849	13	147,679	11,360	2	n/a	n/a	31	209,269	7,216§
16	Rutgers	18	96,511	5,362	10	104,860	10,486	3	862	862§§	31	202,233	6,974§§
	TOTALS	272	2,943,956	10,823	175	2,049,636	11,712	43	201,353	5,922^	490	5,194,945	10,800^
* – does not factor one neutral game played, vs. Georgia, in the 2011 CBE Classic, which does not have an attendance figure on record. Averages are therefore calculated based on the three neutral games and 30 total games with attendance figures. ** – does not factor two neutral games played, vs. Saint Louis and Santa Clara, in the 2011 76 Classic, which do not have attendance figures on record. Averages are therefore calculated based on the two neutral games and 28 total games with attendance figures. † – does not factor one neutral game played, vs. Texas A&M, in the 2011 2K Sports Classic, which does not have an attendance figure on record. Averages are therefore calculated based on the one neutral game and 30 total games with attendance figures. ‡ – does not factor one neutral game played, vs. St. Joseph's, in the 2011 Charleston Classic, which does not have an attendance figure on record. Averages are therefore calculated based on the two neutral games and 29 total games with attendance figures. § – does not factor two neutral games played, vs. Old Dominion and Penn State, in the 2011 Hall of Fame Tip-Off, which do not have attendance figures on record. Overall average is therefore calculated based on the 29 games with attendance figures. §§ – does not factor two neutral games played, vs. Illinois State, in the 2011 Cancún Challenge, and vs. Stony Brook, in the 2011 Holiday Festival, which do not have attendance figures on record. Averages are therefore calculated based on the one neutral game and 29 total games with attendance figures.^ – due to games without attendance figures, overall averages are therefore calculated based on the 34 neutral games and 481 total games with attendance figures.

== Postseason ==
=== Big East tournament ===
For the fourth straight year, all 16 teams in the conference participated in the Big East tournament. Under this format, the teams finishing 9 through 16 in the regular season standings played first-round games, while teams 5 through 8 received a bye to the second round. The top 4 teams during the regular season received a bye to the quarterfinals. The five-round tournament spanned five consecutive days, from Tuesday, March 6, through Saturday, March 10, at Madison Square Garden in New York City.

2012 Big East men's basketball tournament seeds and results
Seed	School	Conf.	Over.	Tiebreaker	First round Tuesday, March 6	Second round Wednesday, March 7	Quarterfinals Thursday, March 8	Semifinals Friday, March 9	Championship Saturday, March 10
1.	‡†Syracuse	17–1	31–2		BYE	BYE	#9 CONN – W, 58–55	#4 CIN – L, 68–71	
2.	†Marquette	14–4	25–7		BYE	BYE	#7 LOU – L, 71–84		
3.	†Notre Dame	13–5	22–11		BYE	BYE	#6 USF – W, 57–53^{OT}	#7 LOU – L, 50–64	
4.	†Cincinnati	12–6	24–10	1–1 vs. USF/GTWN; 0–1 vs. SYR; 1–1 vs. MARQ; 1–0 vs. ND; 1–0 vs. GTWN	BYE	BYE	#5 GTWN – W, 72–70^{2OT}	#1 SYR – W, 71–68	#7 LOU – L, 44–50
5.	#Georgetown	12–6	23–8	1–1 vs. USF/CIN; 0–1 vs. SYR; 1–1 vs. MARQ; 1–0 vs. ND; 0–1 vs. CIN	BYE	#13 PITT – W, 64–52	#4 CIN – L, 70–72^{2OT}		
6.	#South Florida	12–6	20–13	1–1 vs. CIN/GTWN; 0–1 vs. SYR; 0–1 vs. MARQ; 0–1 vs. ND	BYE	#14 VILL – W, 56–47	#3 ND – L, 53–57^{OT}		
7.	#Louisville	10–8	26–9		BYE	#10 HALL – W, 61–55	#2 MARQ – W, 84–71	#3 ND – W, 64–50	#4 CIN – W, 50–44
8.	#West Virginia	9–9	19–13		BYE	#9 CONN – L, 67–71^{OT}			
9.	Connecticut	8–10	20–13	1–1 vs. HALL; 0–2 vs. SYR; 0–1 vs. MARQ; 1–1 vs. ND; 1–2 vs. GTWN/CIN/USF; 0–1 vs. LOU; 1–0 vs. WVU; 2–1 vs. SJU/RUT; 2–0 vs. PITT/VILL	#16 DEP – W, 81–67	#8 WVU – W, 71–67^{OT}	#1 SYR – L, 55–58		
10.	Seton Hall	8–10	20–12	1–1 vs. CONN; 0–1 vs. SYR; 0–1 vs. MARQ; 0–1 vs. ND; 1–2 vs. GTWN/CIN/USF; 0–1 vs. LOU; 1–0 vs. WVU; 1–1 vs. SJU/RUT; 1–1 vs. PITT/VILL	#15 PROV – W, 79–47	#7 LOU – L, 55–61			
11.	Rutgers	6–12	14–18	1–0 vs. SJU	#14 VILL – L, 49–70				
12.	St. John's	6–12	13–19	0–1 vs. RUT	#13 PITT – L, 59–73				
13.	Pittsburgh	5–13	17–15	1–0 vs. VILL	#12 SJU – W, 73–59	#5 GTWN – L, 52–64			
14.	Villanova	5–13	13–19	0–1 vs. PITT	vs. #11 RUT – W, 70–49	#6 USF – L, 47–56			
15.	Providence	4–14	15–17		#10 HALL – L, 47–79				
16.	DePaul	3–15	12–19		#9 CONN – L, 67–81				
‡ – Big East regular season champions, and tournament No. 1 seed. † – Received a double-bye in the conference tournament. # – Received a single-bye in the conference tournament. Overall records include all games played in the Big East tournament.

==== Highlights ====
- The Championship match-up between Louisville and Cincinnati was the first time in the 34-year history of the tournament that at least one of the original seven members of the conference wasn't involved in the title game.

=== NCAA tournament ===
The official tournament selection process took place on Sunday, March 11, and the following nine Big East teams received bids into the tournament:

Seed	Region	School	First Four	Round of 64	Round of 32	Sweet 16	Elite Eight	Final Four	Championship
4	West	Louisville	n/a	#13 Davidson – W, 69–62	#5 New Mexico – W, 59–56	#1 Michigan State – W, 57–44	#7 Florida – W, 72–68	#1 Kentucky - L, 61–69	
1	East	Syracuse	n/a	#16 UNC Asheville – W, 72–65	#8 Kansas State – W, 75–59	#4 Wisconsin – W, 64–63	#2 Ohio State – L, 70–77		
3	West	Marquette	n/a	#14 BYU – W, 88–68	#6 Murray State – W, 62–53	#7 Florida – L, 58–68			
6	East	Cincinnati	n/a	#11 Texas – W, 65–59	#3 Florida State – W, 62–56	#2 Ohio State – W, 81–66			
3	Midwest	Georgetown	n/a	#14 Belmont – W, 74–59	#11 NC State – L, 63–66				
12	Midwest	South Florida	#12 California – W, 65–54	#5 Temple – W, 58–44	#13 Ohio – L, 56–62				
7	South	Notre Dame	n/a	#10 Xavier – L, 63–67					
9	South	Connecticut	n/a	#8 Iowa State – L, 64–77					
10	East	West Virginia	n/a	#7 Gonzaga – L, 54–77					
	9 Bids	W-L (%):	1–0 (1.000)	6–3 (.667)	4–2 (.667)	2–2 (.500)	1–1 (.500)	0–1 (.000)	TOTAL: 14–9 (.609)

After winning the 2012 Big East men's basketball tournament, Louisville continued its winning streak all the way to the Final Four in New Orleans, Louisiana, but was defeated by Kentucky, who then defeated Kansas for the national championship. Louisville guard Peyton Siva, forward Chane Behanan, and center Gorgui Dieng were named to the West All-Regional team, with Siva tapped as the Most Outstanding Player of the region. Syracuse guard Scoop Jardine was named to the East All-Regional team.

=== National Invitation tournament ===
After not receiving a bid to the 2012 NCAA Men's Division I Basketball Tournament, Seton Hall was selected as a top seed to the 2012 National Invitation Tournament. They defeated Stony Brook in the first round before losing to Massachusetts in the second round.

== Rankings ==
Legend
	Improvement in ranking.
	Drop in ranking.
RV	Received votes, but were not ranked.
AP	AP Poll.
C	ESPN/USA Today Coaches Poll.

2011–12 Big East Conference Weekly Rankings
		Pre	Wk 1	Wk 2	Wk 3	Wk 4	Wk 5	Wk 6	Wk 7	Wk 8	Wk 9	Wk 10	Wk 11	Wk 12	Wk 13	Wk 14	Wk 15	Wk 16	Wk 17	Wk 18	FINAL
Cincinnati	AP	21	20	RV	RV					RV		RV	RV						RV	RV	n/a
Cincinnati	C	22	20	RV	RV	RV							RV							RV	18
Connecticut	AP	4	4	4	8	9	9	8	9	8	17	13	24	RV							n/a
Connecticut	C	4	4	4	10	9	10	9	9	8	16	11	19	RV	RV						
DePaul	AP																				n/a
DePaul	C																				
Georgetown	AP			RV	RV	18	16	16	12	9	11	10	9	14	12	10	9	11	13	15	n/a
Georgetown	C		RV		RV	21	17	16	12	9	11	12	10	14	11	9	8	12	14	15	17
Louisville	AP	9	8	7	6	5	4	4	4	11	14	23	RV	RV	24	19	17	19	RV	17	n/a
Louisville	C	8	7	7	6	4	4	4	4	10	15	21	25	25	23	18	17	18	RV	18	4
Marquette	AP	22	21	16	16	11	11	10	14	20	25	21	17	15	18	12	10	8	9	11	n/a
Marquette	C	21	19	17	16	11	11	10	13	20	24	22	18	15	19	13	10	7	9	11	10
Notre Dame	AP			RV										RV	RV	23	20	20	23	RV	n/a
Notre Dame	C	RV		RV										RV	RV	25	18	19	23	RV	RV
Pittsburgh	AP	10	9	17	17	15	15	15	22	RV											n/a
Pittsburgh	C	11	9	16	17	14	14	13	22	RV											RV
Providence	AP																				n/a
Providence	C																				
Rutgers	AP																				n/a
Rutgers	C																				
St. John's	AP																				n/a
St. John's	C	RV	RV																		
Seton Hall	AP									RV	24	RV									n/a
Seton Hall	C							RV		RV	RV	RV									
South Florida	AP																				n/a
South Florida	C																				RV
Syracuse	AP	5	5	5	4	3	1	1	1	1	1	1	3	2	2	2	2	2	2	2	n/a
Syracuse	C	5	5	5	3	3	1	1	1	1	1	1	4	2	2	2	2	2	2	2	5
Villanova	AP	RV	RV	RV	RV																n/a
Villanova	C	RV	RV	RV																	
West Virginia	AP	RV	RV	RV							RV	RV	RV	RV							n/a
West Virginia	C	RV	RV						RV		RV	RV	RV	RV							

== Awards and honors ==
=== Conference awards and teams ===
The following individuals received postseason honors after having been chosen by the Big East Conference coaches.

2012 Big East Men's Basketball Individual Awards
Award	Recipient(s)
Player of the Year	Jae Crowder, F., MARQUETTE
Coach of the Year	Stan Heath, SOUTH FLORIDA
Defensive Player of the Year	Fab Melo, C., SYRACUSE
Rookie of the Year	Moe Harkless, F., ST. JOHN'S
Scholar-Athlete of the Year	Tim Abromaitis, F., NOTRE DAME
Most Improved Player	Jack Cooley, F., NOTRE DAME
Sixth Man Award	Dion Waiters, G., SYRACUSE
Sportsmanship Award	Jason Clark, G., GEORGETOWN

The Player of the Year, Coach of the Year, Rookie of the Year, and Scholar Athlete of the Year awards were announced on Tuesday, March 6, after the post-game interviews of the first session of the first round of the Big East tournament. The remainder of the individual awards were announced on Monday, March 5, while the All-Big East Men's Basketball Teams were announced on Sunday, March 4. Awardees are chosen by a simple ballot, in which coaches are not allowed to vote for their players or themselves (in the case of the Big East Coach of the Year). Coaches voted for Big East Player of the Year and Rookie of the Year from the first team and all-rookie lists, respectively.

Marquette senior forward Jae Crowder was named Player of the Year. Crowder finished the regular season averaging 17.6 points per game, third in the conference, while ranking ninth in the conference in rebounds (7.9 per game). He also ranked second in the Big East in steals (2.4 per game) and recorded seven double-doubles for a Marquette squad that finished second in the conference. South Florida head coach Stan Heath was named Coach of the Year, after leading the Bulls to their first winning conference record (12–6) in the school's seven seasons in the league. Notre Dame's Tim Abromaitis, a graduate forward, became the first player to receive the Scholar Athlete of the Year award for the third year in a row. He was limited to two games in 2011–12 due to injury.

Defensive Player of the Year Feb Melo, a sophomore center from Syracuse, led the conference in blocks, averaging 3.7 blocks per game during the conference season.

St. John's freshman forward Moe Harkless was named Rookie of the Year, after averaging 15.5 points per game, second highest among conference freshmen and sixth among freshmen nationally, and 8.5 rebounds per game, also second among Big East freshmen.

Other awardees included most improved player Jack Cooley, a junior forward from Notre Dame, who went from playing 10.3 minutes per game in 2010–11 to leading the conference in field goal percentage (.621) and finishing fourth in rebounds per game (9.2) in both conference and non-conference play in 2011–12. Syracuse sophomore guard Dion Waiters was honored with the Sixth Man Award, coming off the bench but serving as the Orange's second-leading scorer (11.9 points per game) and team leader in steals (1.9 per game). Finally, Georgetown senior guard Jason Clark received the Sportsmanship Award.

2012 All-Big East Men's Basketball Teams
First Team	Second Team	Third Team	Honorable Mention	All-Rookie Team
Jeremy Lamb, G., CONN; Jason Clark, G., GTWN; Jae Crowder†, F., MARQ; Darius Johnson-Odom, G., MARQ; Kris Joseph, F., SYR; Kevin Jones, F., WVU	Sean Kilpatrick, G., CIN; Jack Cooley, F., ND; Jordan Theodore, G., HALL; Scoop Jardine, G., SYR; Maalik Wayns, G., VILL	Henry Sims, C., GTWN; Vincent Council, G., PROV; Herb Pope, F., HALL; Dion Waiters, G., SYR; Darryl Bryant, G., WVU	Cleveland Melvin, F., DEP; Hollis Thompson, F., GTWN; Kyle Kuric, G/F., LOU; Ashton Gibbs, G., PITT; Moe Harkless, F., SJU	Andre Drummond, C., CONN; Chane Behanan, F., LOU; Jerian Grant, G., ND; LaDontae Henton, F., PROV; Moe Harkless, F., SJU; D'Angelo Harrison, G., SJU; Anthony Collins, G., USF
† - denotes unanimous selection

On the All-Big East Men's Basketball Teams, notable members of the first team included Clark, who was given no all-conference consideration prior to the start of the season, and Crowder, who was an honorable mention in the preseason. Crowder was the only unanimous selection for the first team, teaming up with Marquette guard Darius Johnson-Odom, who was also named to the first team, to form the highest-scoring pair in the conference. In conference games, Crowder finished fourth with 18.0 points per game and tied for first with 2.9 steals per contest. Selected as an honorable mention was Pittsburgh guard Ashton Gibbs, who was selected to the preseason first-team and was named the Preseason Player of the Year. Meanwhile, St. John's placed two players on the All-Rookie Team, guard D'Angelo Harrison and forward Moe Harkless, who were the top two freshman scorers in the conference.

=== National awards and teams ===
==== Players ====
West Virginia forward Kevin Jones was recognized as a consensus Second Team All-American after being named to the second team All-American lists by the Associated Press, the USBWA, and the NABC, while the Sporting News named him to their third team. In addition, Marquette forward Jae Crowder was selected as a Second Team All-American by the Associated Press and the Sporting News, as well as to the third team by the NABC. The NABC also named Syracuse forward Kris Joseph to their second team.

===== Award finalists =====
On March 6, the Wooden Award final ballot was released, and included three Big East players. The list was composed of 15 players, reduced from the midseason list of 25. Marquette forward Jae Crowder was the newcomer to the list, while two Big East players who were on the midseason list did not appear on the final ballot: Darius Johnson-Odom and Jeremy Lamb. No Big East players were among the four finalists for the Naismith Award, announced on March 19.

	Wooden	Naismith
Jae Crowder, MARQ	✓	
Kevin Jones, WVU	✓	
Kris Joseph, SYR	✓	

Kentucky forward Anthony Davis was chosen as both the 2012 Wooden Award and 2012 Naismith Award recipient.

==== Coaches ====
Notre Dame head coach Mike Brey was selected for the Jim Phelan Award for the nation's top head coach.

== See also ==
- 2011–12 NCAA Division I men's basketball season
- 2011–12 Cincinnati Bearcats men's basketball team
- 2011–12 Connecticut Huskies men's basketball team
- 2011–12 Georgetown Hoyas men's basketball team
- 2011–12 Louisville Cardinals men's basketball team
- 2011–12 Marquette Golden Eagles men's basketball team
- 2011–12 Notre Dame Fighting Irish men's basketball team
- 2011–12 Pittsburgh Panthers men's basketball team
- 2011–12 Providence Friars men's basketball team
- 2011–12 Seton Hall Pirates men's basketball team
- 2011–12 St. John's Red Storm men's basketball team
- 2011–12 South Florida Bulls men's basketball team
- 2011–12 Syracuse Orange men's basketball team
- 2011–12 Villanova Wildcats men's basketball team
- 2011–12 West Virginia Mountaineers men's basketball team
