= 2011–12 Providence Friars men's basketball team =

American college basketball season

2011–12 Providence Friars men's basketball
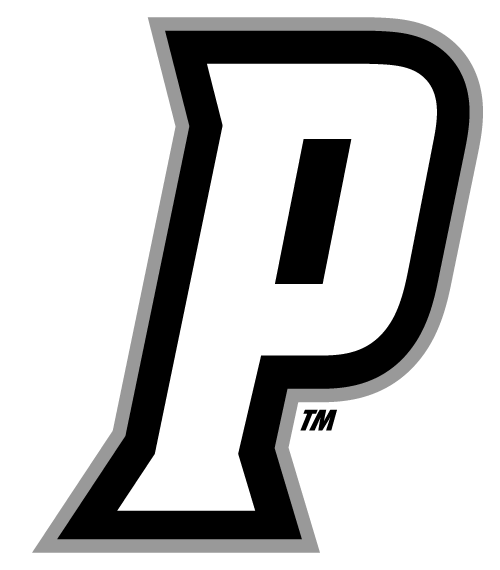
- Conference: Big East Conference (1979–2013)
- Record: 15–17 (4–14 Big East)
- Head coach: Ed Cooley
- Assistant coaches: Andre LaFleur; Bob Simon; Brian Blaney
- MVP: Vincent Council
- Home arena: Dunkin' Donuts Center

2011–12 Big East men's basketball standings
	Conf.				Overall
Team	W		L	PCT	W		L	PCT
No. 11 Marquette	14	–	4	.778	27	–	8	.771
Notre Dame	13	–	5	.722	22	–	12	.647
Cincinnati	12	–	6	.667	26	–	11	.703
No. 15 Georgetown	12	–	6	.667	24	–	9	.727
South Florida	12	–	6	.667	22	–	14	.611
West Virginia	9	–	9	.500	19	–	14	.576
Connecticut	8	–	10	.444	20	–	14	.588
Seton Hall	8	–	10	.444	21	–	13	.618
Rutgers	6	–	12	.333	14	–	18	.438
St. John's	6	–	12	.333	13	–	19	.406
Pittsburgh	5	–	13	.278	22	–	17	.564
Villanova	5	–	13	.278	13	–	19	.406
Providence	4	–	14	.222	15	–	17	.469
DePaul	3	–	15	.167	12	–	19	.387
*No. 2 Syracuse	0	–	1	.000	0	–	3	.000
**No. 17 Louisville†	0	–	8	.000	0	–	10	.000
† 2012 Big East tournament winner As of March 31, 2012; *Syracuse: 30 reg. season games, 4 postseason games vacated due to sanctions against the program; Disputed record: Syracuse–(34–3)(17–1) **Louisville: 25 reg. season games, 5 postseason games vacated due to sanctions against the program; Disputed record: Louisville–(30-10)(10-8); Rankings from AP Poll

The 2011–12 Providence Friars men's basketball team represented Providence College in the Big East Conference. For the third straight season, the team finished with a 4–14 conference record, while amassing a 15–17 record overall.

Replacing Keno Davis, who was fired following the 2010–11 season, Providence native Ed Cooley took over as head coach and his first season with the Friars would come without departing seniors Marshon Brooks, who was a first-round selection in the 2011 NBA draft after leading the Big East in scoring in 2010–11, and reserve center Ray Hall. In addition, sophomore guard Duke Mondy, freshman guard Dre Evans, and redshirt freshman guard Xavier Davis all did not return to the team or transferred, while incoming freshman guard Kiwi Gardner was deemed ineligible to play in the 2011–12 season by the NCAA.

With just nine scholarship players available, the Friars had three players in the top five in the conference for minutes played per game, including freshman forward LaDontae Henton (37.2 minutes per game), who was named the Big East All-Rookie Team, and sophomore guard Bryce Cotton (38.6 minutes per game). Leading the conference in both minutes per game (38.7) and assists per game (7.5) was junior guard Vincent Council, who was selected to the All-Big East Third Team.

The Friars managed four conference wins, but defeated #14 Louisville at home, 90–59, on January 10. The Friars did not receive votes in either the AP Poll or Coaches' Poll at any point in the season. They finished 15th in the conference and were defeated by Seton Hall in the first round of the 2012 Big East men's basketball tournament.

== Roster ==
2011–12 Providence Friars men's basketball team
Players
Coaches

Pos.	#	Name	Height	Weight	Year	Previous school	Hometown
F	--	Sidiki Johnson (I)	6 ft 8 in (2.03 m)	220 lb (100 kg)	Fr	Wadleigh High School	Bronx, New York
G	1	Gerard Coleman	6 ft 4 in (1.93 m)	180 lb (82 kg)	So	Tilton School	Boston, Massachusetts
F	10	Kadeem Batts	6 ft 9 in (2.06 m)	250 lb (113 kg)	RS So	McEachern High School	Powder Springs, Georgia
G	11	Bryce Cotton	6 ft 1 in (1.85 m)	165 lb (75 kg)	So	Palo Verde High School	Tucson, Arizona
F	13	Brice Kofane	6 ft 8 in (2.03 m)	205 lb (93 kg)	RS Fr	The Miller School	Yaoundé, Cameroon
F	21	Lee Goldsbrough	6 ft 9 in (2.06 m)	220 lb (100 kg)	So	Loreto College	Newcastle, England
F	23	LaDontae Henton	6 ft 6 in (1.98 m)	220 lb (100 kg)	Fr	Eastern High School	Lansing, Michigan
G	31	Anthony Muhammad (W)	6 ft 3 in (1.91 m)	185 lb (84 kg)	Sr	Hope High School	Providence, Rhode Island
G	32	Vincent Council	6 ft 2 in (1.88 m)	180 lb (82 kg)	Jr	The Patterson School	Brooklyn, New York
G	33	Kiwi Gardner (I)	5 ft 10 in (1.78 m)	165 lb (75 kg)	Fr	Westwind Preparatory Academy	Oakland, California
F	34	Ron Giplaye	6 ft 6 in (1.98 m)	230 lb (104 kg)	So	Notre Dame Prep	Lowell, Massachusetts
G	35	Maurice Grant (W)	6 ft 3 in (1.91 m)	195 lb (88 kg)	Fr	Bergen Catholic High School	Saddle River, New Jersey
G	41	Chris Carter (W)	6 ft 4 in (1.93 m)	180 lb (82 kg)	RS Sr	Shepherd Hill Regional High School	Worcester, Massachusetts
F/C	42	Bilal Dixon	6 ft 9 in (2.06 m)	245 lb (111 kg)	RS Jr	Queen of Peace High School	Jersey City, New Jersey
G	51	Ted Bancroft (W)	6 ft 4 in (1.93 m)	187 lb (85 kg)	So	Bishop Stang High School	Marion, Massachusetts
G	53	Mike Murray (W)	6 ft 2 in (1.88 m)	188 lb (85 kg)	So	La Salle Institute	Troy, New York

Head coach

Ed Cooley

Assistant coach(es)

Andre LaFleur
Bob Simon
Brian Blaney

Legend

- (C) Team captain
- (S) Suspended
- (I) Ineligible
- (W) Walk-on
- Injured
- Current redshirt

Roster
Last update: 2012-02-22

=== Depth chart ===
Pos.	Starting 5	Bench 1	Bench 2	Bench 3
F/C	Kadeem Batts	Brice Kofane; Bilal Dixon; Ron Giplaye	Lee Goldsbrough
F	LaDontae Henton
G/F	Gerard Coleman	Anthony Muhammad (W)	Chris Carter (W)
G	Bryce Cotton		Ted Bancroft (W)	Mike Murray (W)
PG	Vincent Council			Maurice Grant (W)

=== Incoming recruits ===
College recruiting
Name	Hometown	School	Height	Weight	Commit date
Kiwi Gardner; PG	Manteca, CA	Westwind Preparatory Academy	5 ft 8 in (1.73 m)	155 lb (70 kg)	Apr 21, 2011
Kiwi Gardner; PG	Recruit ratings: Scout: Rivals: (88)				
LaDontae Henton; SF	Lansing, MI	Eastern HS	6 ft 6 in (1.98 m)	215 lb (98 kg)	May 5, 2011
LaDontae Henton; SF	Recruit ratings: Rivals: (89)				
Overall recruit ranking:
Note: In many cases, Scout, Rivals, 247Sports, On3, and ESPN may conflict in their listings of height and weight.; In these cases, the average was taken. ESPN grades are on a 100-point scale.; Sources: "2011 Providence Signees". Rivals.; "2011 Providence Signees". Scout.; "2011 Providence Signees". ESPN.; "Scout.com Team Recruiting Rankings". Scout.; "2011 Team Ranking". Rivals.

== Schedule ==
Date time, TV	Rank^{#}	Opponent^{#}	Result	Record	Site city, state
Exhibition games
October 25*; 7:00 pm		Assumption (D-II)	W 64–51		Alumni Hall; Providence, RI
November 5*; 7:00 pm		UMass Lowell (D-II)	W 76–75		Dunkin' Donuts Center; Providence, RI
Non-conference games
November 12*; 2:00 pm		Fairleigh Dickinson	W 72–61	1–0	Dunkin' Donuts Center; Providence, RI
November 14*; 7:30 pm, Cox Sports		at Fairfield	W 80–72	2–0	Webster Bank Arena; Bridgeport, CT
November 19*; 4:00 pm		Florida A&M; South Padre Island Invitational	W 87–65	3–0	Dunkin' Donuts Center; Providence, RI
November 22*; 7:00 pm		Southern; South Padre Island Invitational	W 59–53	4–0	Dunkin' Donuts Center; Providence, RI
November 25*; 8:30 pm		vs. Iowa State; South Padre Island Invitational	L 54–64	4–1	South Padre Island Convention Centre; South Padre Island, TX
November 26*; 10:00 pm, CBS Sports Network		vs. Northern Iowa; South Padre Island Invitational	L 62–79	4–2	South Padre Island Convention Centre; South Padre Island, TX
November 29*; 7:00 pm		Holy Cross	W 82–77	5–2	Dunkin' Donuts Center; Providence, RI
December 1*; 7:00 pm, ESPNU		at South Carolina; SEC–Big East Challenge	W 76–67	6–2	Colonial Life Arena; Columbia, SC
December 5*; 7:00 pm, Cox Sports		Brown	W 80–49	7–2	Dunkin' Donuts Center; Providence, RI
December 8*; 7:00 pm, ESPN3		Boston College	W 64–57	8–2	Dunkin' Donuts Center; Providence, RI
December 10*; 12:00 pm, Cox Sports		Bryant	W 72–61	9–2	Dunkin' Donuts Center; Providence, RI
December 20*; 7:00 pm, Cox Sports		New Hampshire	W 67–52	10–2	Dunkin' Donuts Center; Providence, RI
December 23*; 7:00 pm, Cox Sports		at Rhode Island	W 80–61	11–2	Ryan Center; Kingston, RI
Big East regular season
December 27; 7:00 pm, Cox Sports		at St. John's	L 67–91	11–3 (0–1)	Carnesecca Arena; Queens, NY
December 31; 2:00 pm, ESPN2		at No. 12 Georgetown	L 40–49	11–4 (0–2)	Verizon Center; Washington, D.C.
January 4; 9:00 pm, Cox Sports		No. 1 Syracuse	L 73–87	11–5 (0–3)	Dunkin' Donuts Center; Providence, RI
January 7; 6:00 pm, Cox Sports		Seton Hall	L 57–66	11–6 (0–4)	Dunkin' Donuts Center; Providence, RI
January 10; 7:00 pm, ESPN2		No. 14 Louisville	W 90–59	12–6 (1–4)	Dunkin' Donuts Center; Providence, RI
January 14; 6:00 pm, Cox Sports		at No. 1 Syracuse	L 55–78	12–7 (1–5)	Carrier Dome; Syracuse, NY
January 21; 7:00 pm, Cox Sports		No. 21 Marquette	L 72–79	12–8 (1–6)	Dunkin' Donuts Center; Providence, RI
January 25; 7:00 pm, Cox Sports		at Pittsburgh	L 74–86	12–9 (1–7)	Petersen Events Center; Pittsburgh, PA
January 29; 2:00 pm, ESPN3		at South Florida	L 78–81	12–10 (1–8)	Tampa Bay Times Forum; Tampa, FL
February 1; 7:00 pm, ESPNU		Rutgers	W 78–67	13–10 (2–8)	Dunkin' Donuts Center; Providence, RI
February 5; 12:00 pm, Cox Sports		West Virginia	L 84–87 ^{OT}	13–11 (2–9)	Dunkin' Donuts Center; Providence, RI
February 7; 8:00 pm, Cox Sports		at Villanova	L 72–74	13–12 (2–10)	The Pavilion; Villanova, PA
February 11; 4:00 pm, ESPN3		South Florida	L 48–55	13–13 (2–11)	Dunkin' Donuts Center; Providence, RI
February 15; 9:00 pm, ESPNU		at Cincinnati	L 66–81	13–14 (2–12)	Fifth Third Arena; Cincinnati, OH
February 18; 7:00 pm, Cox Sports		No. 10 Georgetown	L 53–63	13–15 (2–13)	Dunkin' Donuts Center; Providence, RI
February 25; 2:00 pm, ESPN3		at DePaul	W 73–71	14–15 (3–13)	Allstate Arena; Rosemont, IL
February 28; 7:00 pm, Cox Sports		Connecticut	W 72–70	15–15 (4–13)	Dunkin' Donuts Center; Providence, RI
March 2; 7:00 pm, Cox Sports		at No. 20 Notre Dame	L 69–75	15–16 (4–14)	Edmund P. Joyce Center; Notre Dame, IN
Big East tournament
March 6; 7:00 pm, ESPNU		vs. Seton Hall; First Round	L 47–79	15–17 (4–14)	Madison Square Garden; New York, NY
*Non-conference game. ^{#}Rankings from AP Poll. (#) Tournament seedings in parentheses. All times are in Eastern Time.

== Awards and honors ==
Recipient	Award(s)
Ted Bancroft	2012 John Zannini Coaches' Award
Bryce Cotton	2012 Ryan Gomes Most Improved Player Award
Vincent Council	2012 All-Big East Third Team; 2012 USBWA All-District 1; 2012 Jimmy Walker Most Valuable Player Award
Lee Goldsbrough	2012 Lenny Wilkens Hustle Award
LaDontae Henton	2012 Big East All-Rookie Team; 2012 Coca-Cola Most Promising Prospect Award; March 5: Big East Rookie of the Week; December 12: Big East Rookie of the Week; December 5: Big East Rookie of the Week
Brice Kofane	2012 Marvin Barnes Defensive Player Award
Mike Murray	2012 Thomas Ramos Academic Award
