= 2011–12 Seton Hall Pirates men's basketball team =

American college basketball season

2011–12 Seton Hall Pirates men's basketball

NIT, Second Round
- Conference: Big East Conference
- Record: 21–13 (8–10 Big East)
- Head coach: Kevin Willard (2nd season)
- Assistant coaches: Shaheen Holloway; Chris Pompey; Dan McHale
- Home arena: Prudential Center; Walsh Gymnasium

2011–12 Big East men's basketball standings
	Conf.				Overall
Team	W		L	PCT	W		L	PCT
No. 11 Marquette	14	–	4	.778	27	–	8	.771
Notre Dame	13	–	5	.722	22	–	12	.647
Cincinnati	12	–	6	.667	26	–	11	.703
No. 15 Georgetown	12	–	6	.667	24	–	9	.727
South Florida	12	–	6	.667	22	–	14	.611
West Virginia	9	–	9	.500	19	–	14	.576
Connecticut	8	–	10	.444	20	–	14	.588
Seton Hall	8	–	10	.444	21	–	13	.618
Rutgers	6	–	12	.333	14	–	18	.438
St. John's	6	–	12	.333	13	–	19	.406
Pittsburgh	5	–	13	.278	22	–	17	.564
Villanova	5	–	13	.278	13	–	19	.406
Providence	4	–	14	.222	15	–	17	.469
DePaul	3	–	15	.167	12	–	19	.387
*No. 2 Syracuse	0	–	1	.000	0	–	3	.000
**No. 17 Louisville†	0	–	8	.000	0	–	10	.000
† 2012 Big East tournament winner As of March 31, 2012; *Syracuse: 30 reg. season games, 4 postseason games vacated due to sanctions against the program; Disputed record: Syracuse–(34–3)(17–1) **Louisville: 25 reg. season games, 5 postseason games vacated due to sanctions against the program; Disputed record: Louisville–(30-10)(10-8); Rankings from AP Poll

The 2011–12 Seton Hall Pirates men's basketball team represented Seton Hall University during the 2011–12 NCAA Division I men's basketball season. The Pirates, led by head coach Kevin Willard, played its home games in Newark, New Jersey at the Prudential Center and are members of the Big East Conference. They finished the season 21–13, 8–10 in Big East play to finish in a tie for eighth place. They lost in the second round of the Big East Basketball tournament to Louisville. They were invited to the 2012 National Invitation Tournament, where they hosted two home games played at Walsh Gymnasium and lost in the second round to Massachusetts.

== Roster ==
2011–12 Seton Hall Pirates men's basketball team
Players
Coaches

Pos.	#	Name	Height	Weight	Year	Hometown
G	1	Jordan Theodore	6 ft 0 in (1.83 m)	174 lb (79 kg)	Sr	Englewood, New Jersey
F	2	Brandon Mobley	6 ft 9 in (2.06 m)	210 lb (95 kg)	Fr	Savannah, Georgia
G	4	Aaron Cosby	6 ft 3 in (1.91 m)	190 lb (86 kg)	Fr	Louisville, Kentucky
G	10	Sean Grennan	6 ft 2 in (1.88 m)	170 lb (77 kg)	Fr	Sea Girt, New Jersey
F	13	Haralds Kārlis	6 ft 5 in (1.96 m)	185 lb (84 kg)	Fr	Riga, Latvia
G	14	Freddie Wilson	6 ft 2 in (1.88 m)	175 lb (79 kg)	Fr	New Haven, Connecticut
F	15	Herb Pope	6 ft 8 in (2.03 m)	236 lb (107 kg)	RS Sr	Aliquippa, Pennsylvania
G	20	John Snow	6 ft 1 in (1.85 m)	183 lb (83 kg)	Fr	Newark, New Jersey
C	21	Gene Teague	6 ft 9 in (2.06 m)	290 lb (132 kg)	RS So	Vineland, New Jersey
G	22	Brian Oliver	6 ft 5 in (1.96 m)	226 lb (103 kg)	RS So	Glassboro, New Jersey
G	23	Fuquan Edwin	6 ft 6 in (1.98 m)	205 lb (93 kg)	So	Paterson, New Jersey
F	32	Kevin Johnson	6 ft 9 in (2.06 m)	240 lb (109 kg)	Fr	Compton, California
F	33	Patrik Auda	6 ft 9 in (2.06 m)	225 lb (102 kg)	So	Brno, Czech Republic
G	35	Peter Dill	6 ft 3 in (1.91 m)	200 lb (91 kg)	Sr	Long Hill, New Jersey
C	42	Aaron Geramipoor	6 ft 11 in (2.11 m)	255 lb (116 kg)	So	Manchester, England

Head coach

- Kevin Willard (Pittsburgh)

Assistant coach(es)

- Shaheen Holloway (Seton Hall)
- Chris Pompey (Pittsburgh)
- Dan McHale (Kentucky)

Legend

- (C) Team captain
- (S) Suspended
- (I) Ineligible
- (W) Walk-on
- Injured
- Current redshirt

== Schedule and results ==
Date time, TV	Rank^{#}	Opponent^{#}	Result	Record	Site city, state
Non-conference regular season
November 12*; 7:00 pm, SNY		St. Francis	W 75–71 ^{OT}	1–0	Prudential Center; Newark, NJ
November 17*; 5:00 pm, ESPNU		vs. VCU; Charleston Classic First Round	W 69–54	2–0	Carolina First Arena; Charleston, SC
November 18*; 6:00 pm, ESPN3		vs. Saint Joseph's; 2011 Charleston Classic Semifinals	W 78–70	3–0	Carolina First Arena; Charleston, SC
November 20*; 8:30 pm, ESPNU		vs. Northwestern; 2011 Charleston Classic Championship	L 73–80	3–1	Carolina First Arena; Charleston, SC
November 22*; 7:00 pm		Yale	W 73–62	4–1	Prudential Center; Newark, NJ
November 26*; 7:00 pm		Saint Peter's	W 63–54	5–1	Prudential Center; Newark, NJ
December 2*; 9:00 pm		Auburn; SEC–Big East Challenge	W 81–59	6–1	Prudential Center; Newark, NJ
December 6*; 7:00 pm		at NJIT	W 78–48	7–1	Prudential Center; Newark, NJ
December 10*; 8:00 pm		Wake Forest	W 68–54	8–1	Prudential Center; Newark, NJ
December 18*; 12:00 pm		Mercer	W 80–77 ^{OT}	9–1	Prudential Center; Newark, NJ
December 21*; 7:00 pm		at Dayton	W 69–64	10–1	UD Arena; Dayton, OH
December 23*; 7:00 pm, SNY		at Longwood	W 87–61	11–1	Willett Hall; Farmville, VA
Big East regular season
December 28; 7:00 pm, Big East Network		at No. 1 Syracuse	L 49–75	11–2 (0–1)	Carrier Dome; Syracuse, NY
December 30; 9:00 pm, ESPN2		West Virginia	W 67–48	12–2 (1–1)	Prudential Center; Newark, NJ
January 3; 7:00 pm, BIG EAST Network		No. 8 Connecticut	W 75–63	13–2 (2–1)	Prudential Center; Newark, NJ
January 7; 6:00 pm, BIG EAST Network		at Providence	W 66–57	14–2 (3–1)	Dunkin' Donuts Center; Providence, RI
January 10; 7:00 pm, BIG EAST Network	No. 24	DePaul	W 94–73	15–2 (4–1)	Prudential Center; Newark, NJ
January 13; 7:00 pm, BIG EAST Network	No. 24	at South Florida	L 55–56	15–3 (4–2)	Tampa Bay Times Forum; Tampa, FL
January 18; 7:00 pm, ESPNU		at Villanova	L 76–84	15–4 (4–3)	The Pavilion; Villanova, PA
January 25; 8:00 pm, BIG EAST Network		Notre Dame	L 42–55	15–5 (4–4)	Prudential Center; Newark, NJ
January 28; 8:00 pm, BIG EAST Network		Louisville	L 51–60	15–6 (4–5)	Prudential Center; Newark, NJ
January 31; 8:00 pm, BIG EAST Network		at No. 15 Marquette	L 59–66	15–7 (4–6)	Bradley Center; Milwaukee, WI
February 3; 7:00 pm, BIG EAST Network		at Connecticut	L 46–69	15–8 (4–7)	XL Center; Hartford, CT
February 8; 9:00 pm, ESPN2		at Rutgers; Rivalry	W 59–54	16–8 (5–7)	Louis Brown Athletic Center; Piscataway, NJ
February 12; 12:00 pm, BIG EAST Network		Pittsburgh	W 73–66	17–8 (6–7)	Prudential Center; Newark, NJ
February 14; 7:00 pm, BIG EAST Network		St. John's	W 94–64	18–8 (7–7)	Prudential Center; Newark, NJ
February 18; 4:00 pm, BIG EAST Network		at Cincinnati	L 57–62	18–9 (7–8)	Fifth Third Arena; Cincinnati, OH
February 21; 7:00 pm, BIG EAST Network		No. 9 Georgetown	W 73–55	19–9 (8–8)	Prudential Center; Newark, NJ
February 25; 5:00 pm, ESPNU		Rutgers; Rivalry	L 72–77 ^{OT}	19–10 (8–9)	Prudential Center; Newark, NJ
March 3; 6:00 pm, BIG EAST Network		at DePaul	L 58–86	19–11 (8–10)	Allstate Arena; Rosemont, IL
Big East tournament
March 6; 7:00 pm, ESPNU	(10)	vs. (15) Providence; First Round	W 79–47	20–11	Madison Square Garden; New York, NY
March 7; 7:00 pm, ESPN	(10)	vs. (7) Louisville; Second Round	L 55–61	20–12	Madison Square Garden; New York, NY
NIT
March 13; 7:15 pm, ESPN3	(1 SH)	(8 SH) Stony Brook; First Round	W 63–61	21–12	Walsh Gymnasium; South Orange, NJ
March 17; 11:00 am, ESPN	(1 SH)	(5 SH) Massachusetts; Second Round	L 67–77	21–13	Walsh Gymnasium; South Orange, NJ
*Non-conference game. ^{#}Rankings from AP Poll. (#) Tournament seedings in parentheses. All times are in Eastern Time.

== See also ==
- 2011–12 Big East Conference men's basketball season
