= 2012 Big East men's basketball tournament =

- 2012 Big East Championship logo
- Classification: Division I
- Season: 2011–12
- Teams: 16
- Site: Madison Square Garden; New York City
- Champions: Louisville (2nd title)
- Winning coach: Rick Pitino (2nd title)
- MVP: Peyton Siva (Louisville)
- Top scorer: Kyle Kuric (Louisville) (58 points)
- Television: ESPN

2011–12 Big East men's basketball standings
	Conf.				Overall
Team	W		L	PCT	W		L	PCT
No. 11 Marquette	14	–	4	.778	27	–	8	.771
Notre Dame	13	–	5	.722	22	–	12	.647
Cincinnati	12	–	6	.667	26	–	11	.703
No. 15 Georgetown	12	–	6	.667	24	–	9	.727
South Florida	12	–	6	.667	22	–	14	.611
West Virginia	9	–	9	.500	19	–	14	.576
Connecticut	8	–	10	.444	20	–	14	.588
Seton Hall	8	–	10	.444	21	–	13	.618
Rutgers	6	–	12	.333	14	–	18	.438
St. John's	6	–	12	.333	13	–	19	.406
Pittsburgh	5	–	13	.278	22	–	17	.564
Villanova	5	–	13	.278	13	–	19	.406
Providence	4	–	14	.222	15	–	17	.469
DePaul	3	–	15	.167	12	–	19	.387
*No. 2 Syracuse	0	–	1	.000	0	–	3	.000
**No. 17 Louisville†	0	–	8	.000	0	–	10	.000
† 2012 Big East tournament winner As of March 31, 2012; *Syracuse: 30 reg. season games, 4 postseason games vacated due to sanctions against the program; Disputed record: Syracuse–(34–3)(17–1) **Louisville: 25 reg. season games, 5 postseason games vacated due to sanctions against the program; Disputed record: Louisville–(30-10)(10-8); Rankings from AP Poll

The 2012 Big East men's basketball tournament, officially known as the 2012 Big East Championship, was the 33rd annual Big East men's basketball tournament, deciding the champion of the 2011–12 Big East Conference men's basketball season. For the 30th consecutive season, the tournament was held at Madison Square Garden in New York City, from March 6–10, 2012. The tournament was the last to feature participation from West Virginia as they joined the Big 12 Conference on July 1, 2012.

In the final, Louisville defeated Cincinnati, 50–44, to win their second Big East championship in school history. Louisville guard Peyton Siva received the Dave Gavitt Trophy as the most outstanding player of the tournament.

== Seeds ==
This was the fourth Big East tournament to include all 16 of the conference's teams. The teams finishing nine through 16 in the regular season standings played first-round games, while teams five through eight received byes to the second round. The top four teams during the regular season received double-byes to the quarterfinals.

2012 Big East Men's Basketball Tournament seeds
Seed	School	Conf.	Over.	Tiebreaker
1.	‡†Syracuse	17–1	30–1	
2.	†Marquette	14–4	25–6	
3.	†Notre Dame	13–5	21–10	
4.	†Cincinnati	12–6	22–9	1–1 vs. USF/GTWN; 0–1 vs. SYR; 1–1 vs. MARQ; 1–0 vs. ND; 1–0 vs. GTWN
5.	#Georgetown	12–6	22–7	1–1 vs. USF/CIN; 0–1 vs. SYR; 1–1 vs. MARQ; 1–0 vs. ND; 0–1 vs. CIN
6.	#South Florida	12–6	19–12	1–1 vs. CIN/GTWN; 0–1 vs. SYR; 0–1 vs. MARQ; 0–1 vs. ND
7.	#Louisville	10–8	22–9	
8.	#West Virginia	9–9	19–12	
9.	Connecticut	8–10	18–12	1–1 vs. HALL; 0–2 vs. SYR; 0–1 vs. MARQ; 1–1 vs. ND
10.	Seton Hall	8–10	19–11	1–1 vs. CONN; 0–1 vs. SYR; 0–1 vs. MARQ; 0–1 vs. ND
11.	Rutgers	6–12	14–17	1–0 vs. SJU
12.	St. John's	6–12	13–18	0–1 vs. RUT
13.	Pittsburgh	5–13	16–15	1–0 vs. VILL
14.	Villanova	5–13	12–18	0–1 vs. PITT
15.	Providence	4–14	15–16	
16.	DePaul	3–15	12–18	
‡ – Big East regular season champions, and tournament No. 1 seed. † – Received a double-bye in the conference tournament. # – Received a single-bye in the conference tournament. Overall records are as of the end of the regular season.

== Schedule ==
All tournament games were nationally televised on an ESPN network:

Session	Game	Time*	Matchup^{#}	Television	Attendance
First Round – Tuesday, March 6
1	1	12:00 PM	#9 Connecticut vs. #16 DePaul	ESPN2	20,057
1	2	2:00 PM	#12 St. John's vs. #13 Pittsburgh	ESPN2	20,057
2	3	7:00 PM	#10 Seton Hall vs. #15 Providence	ESPNU	20,057
2	4	9:00 PM	#11 Rutgers vs. #14 Villanova	ESPNU	20,057
Second Round – Wednesday, March 7
3	5	12:00 PM	#8 West Virginia vs. #9 Connecticut	ESPN	20,057
3	6	2:00 PM	#5 Georgetown vs. #13 Pittsburgh	ESPN	20,057
4	7	7:00 PM	#7 Louisville vs. #10 Seton Hall	ESPN	20,057
4	8	9:00 PM	#6 South Florida vs. #14 Villanova	ESPN	20,057
Quarterfinals – Thursday, March 8
5	9	12:00 PM	#1 Syracuse vs. #9 Connecticut	ESPN	20,057
5	10	2:00 PM	#4 Cincinnati vs. #5 Georgetown	ESPN	20,057
6	11	7:00 PM	#2 Marquette vs. #7 Louisville	ESPN	20,057
6	12	9:00 PM	#3 Notre Dame vs. #6 South Florida	ESPN	20,057
Semifinals – Friday, March 9
7	13	7:00 PM	#1 Syracuse vs. #4 Cincinnati	ESPN	20,057
7	14	9:00 PM	#7 Louisville vs. #3 Notre Dame	ESPN	20,057
Championship Game – Saturday, March 10
8	15	9:00 PM	#4 Cincinnati vs. #7 Louisville	ESPN	20,057
*Game Times in EST. #-Rankings denote tournament seeding.

== Bracket ==
All rankings from AP Poll:

First round Tuesday, March 6, 2012
9	Connecticut	81
16	DePaul	67
13	Pittsburgh	73
12	St. John's	59
10	Seton Hall	79
15	Providence	47
11	Rutgers	49
14	Villanova	70

Second round Wednesday, March 7, 2012
8	West Virginia	67
9	Connecticut	71^{OT}
5	#13 Georgetown	64
13	Pittsburgh	52
7	Louisville	61
10	Seton Hall	55
6	South Florida	56
14	Villanova	47

Quarterfinals; Thursday, March 8, 2012
1	#2 Syracuse	58
9	Connecticut	55
4	Cincinnati	72^{OT}
5	#13 Georgetown	70
2	#9 Marquette	71
7	Louisville	84
3	#23 Notre Dame	57^{OT}
6	South Florida	53

Semifinals; Friday, March 9, 2012
1	#2 Syracuse	68
4	Cincinnati	71
7	Louisville	64
3	#23 Notre Dame	50

Championship Game; Saturday, March 10, 2012
4	Cincinnati	44
7	Louisville	50

^{OT} denotes overtime game

== All-Tournament team ==
Following the tournament final, the Big East Conference named its All-Tournament team, composed of the top performers from the entire tournament. Louisville guard Peyton Siva was awarded the Dave Gavitt Trophy as the tournament's most outstanding player, the first time a Louisville player received the tournament MVP award.

2012 Big East Men's Basketball All-Tournament Team
Team	Position	Player	Games	Points	Rebounds	Assists	Blocks
LOU	G	Peyton Siva†	4	55	25	23	2
LOU	C	Gorgui Dieng	4	35	36	2	13
LOU	G/F	Kyle Kuric	4	58	11	6	3
CIN	F	Yancy Gates	3	50	21	2	0
CIN	G	Cashmere Wright	3	37	10	14	0
SYR	G	Dion Waiters	2	46	3	5	1

† Received Dave Gavitt Trophy (Most Outstanding Player)

== See also ==
- 2012 Big East women's basketball tournament
