= 2011–12 Connecticut Huskies men's basketball team =

American college basketball season

2011–12 Connecticut Huskies men's basketball

NCAA tournament, Round of 64
- Conference: Big East Conference
- Record: 20–14 (8–10 Big East)
- Head coach: Jim Calhoun (26th season)
- Assistant coaches: George Blaney; Kevin Ollie; Glen Miller
- Home arena: Harry A. Gampel Pavilion; XL Center

2011–12 Big East men's basketball standings
	Conf.				Overall
Team	W		L	PCT	W		L	PCT
No. 11 Marquette	14	–	4	.778	27	–	8	.771
Notre Dame	13	–	5	.722	22	–	12	.647
Cincinnati	12	–	6	.667	26	–	11	.703
No. 15 Georgetown	12	–	6	.667	24	–	9	.727
South Florida	12	–	6	.667	22	–	14	.611
West Virginia	9	–	9	.500	19	–	14	.576
Connecticut	8	–	10	.444	20	–	14	.588
Seton Hall	8	–	10	.444	21	–	13	.618
Rutgers	6	–	12	.333	14	–	18	.438
St. John's	6	–	12	.333	13	–	19	.406
Pittsburgh	5	–	13	.278	22	–	17	.564
Villanova	5	–	13	.278	13	–	19	.406
Providence	4	–	14	.222	15	–	17	.469
DePaul	3	–	15	.167	12	–	19	.387
*No. 2 Syracuse	0	–	1	.000	0	–	3	.000
**No. 17 Louisville†	0	–	8	.000	0	–	10	.000
† 2012 Big East tournament winner As of March 31, 2012; *Syracuse: 30 reg. season games, 4 postseason games vacated due to sanctions against the program; Disputed record: Syracuse–(34–3)(17–1) **Louisville: 25 reg. season games, 5 postseason games vacated due to sanctions against the program; Disputed record: Louisville–(30-10)(10-8); Rankings from AP Poll

The 2011–12 Connecticut Huskies men's basketball team represented the University of Connecticut in the 2011–2012 NCAA Division I basketball season. The Huskies were coached by Jim Calhoun and played their home games at the XL Center in Hartford, Connecticut, and on campus at the Harry A. Gampel Pavilion in Storrs, Connecticut. The Huskies were a member of the Big East Conference.

As punishment for prior recruiting violations, head coach Jim Calhoun served a three-game suspension, in UConn's first three Big East games (at South Florida, St. John's, at Seton Hall). The team also lost one scholarship, reduced from 13 to 12, and was restricted in other recruiting activities. On February 4, 2012, Calhoun announced he would take an indefinite medical break from coaching as a result of spinal stenosis. Associate head coach George Blaney said he would be managing the team during Calhoun's absence.

In the 2012 NCAA Tournament UConn lost to Iowa State 77–64 in the first round.

== Roster ==
2011–12 Connecticut Huskies men's basketball team
Players
Coaches

Pos.	#	Name	Height	Weight	Year	Hometown
G	4	Brendan Allen	6 ft 3 in (1.91 m)	187 lb (85 kg)	Fr	Windsor, CT
G	21	Kyle Bailey	6 ft 3 in (1.91 m)	170 lb (77 kg)	Sr	Lancaster, NH
G	11	Ryan Boatright	6 ft 2 in (1.88 m)	165 lb (75 kg)	Fr	Aurora, IL
F/C	25	Michael Bradley	6 ft 10 in (2.08 m)	235 lb (107 kg)	RS Fr	Chattanooga, TN
G	14	P.J. Cochrane	6 ft 2 in (1.88 m)	200 lb (91 kg)	Sr	Newtown, CT
F	2	DeAndre Daniels	6 ft 7 in (2.01 m)	191 lb (87 kg)	Fr	Woodland Hills, CA
C	12	Andre Drummond	6 ft 10 in (2.08 m)	275 lb (125 kg)	Fr	Middletown, CT
G/F	5	Niels Giffey	6 ft 7 in (2.01 m)	210 lb (95 kg)	So	Berlin, Germany
G/F	3	Jeremy Lamb	6 ft 5 in (1.96 m)	185 lb (84 kg)	So	Norcross, GA
G	13	Shabazz Napier	6 ft 0 in (1.83 m)	170 lb (77 kg)	So	Randolph, MA
F	10	Tyler Olander	6 ft 9 in (2.06 m)	225 lb (102 kg)	So	Mansfield, CT
F/C	34	Alex Oriakhi	6 ft 9 in (2.06 m)	240 lb (109 kg)	Jr	Lowell, MA
F	22	Roscoe Smith	6 ft 8 in (2.03 m)	205 lb (93 kg)	So	Baltimore, MD
F	23	Benjamin Stewart	6 ft 5 in (1.96 m)	205 lb (93 kg)	Jr	Denver, CO
G	40	Ethan Waite	5 ft 10 in (1.78 m)	165 lb (75 kg)	Sr	East Hartford, CT
C	1	Enosch Wolf	7 ft 1 in (2.16 m)	260 lb (118 kg)	So	Göttingen, Germany

Head coach

- Jim Calhoun

Assistant coach(es)

- George Blaney
- Kevin Ollie
- Glen Miller

Legend

- (C) Team captain
- (S) Suspended
- (I) Ineligible
- (W) Walk-on
- Injured
- Current redshirt

Roster
Last update: October 14, 2011

== Schedule ==
Date time, TV	Rank^{#}	Opponent^{#}	Result	Record	Site (attendance) city, state
Exhibition
November 2*; 7:30 pm	No. 4	American International	W 78–35		Harry A. Gampel Pavilion (9,038); Storrs, CT
November 6*; 1:00 pm	No. 4	C.W. Post	W 91–61		XL Center (7,215); Hartford, CT
Regular Season
November 11*; 7:00 pm, ESPNU	No. 4	Columbia	W 70–57	1–0	Harry A. Gampel Pavilion (10,167); Storrs, CT
November 14*; 7:30 pm, SNY	No. 4	Wagner	W 78–66	2–0	Harry A. Gampel Pavilion (9,217); Storrs, CT
November 17*; 7:00 pm, SNY	No. 4	Maine	W 80–60	3–0	XL Center (10,726); Hartford, CT
November 20*; 1:00 pm, SNY	No. 4	Coppin State	W 87–70	4–0	XL Center (11,397); Hartford, CT
November 24*; 7:00 pm, HDNet	No. 4	vs. UNC Asheville; Battle 4 Atlantis quarterfinal	W 73–63	5–0	Atlantis Resort (2,530); Nassau, Bahamas
November 25*; 2:00 pm, Versus	No. 4	vs. UCF; Battle 4 Atlantis semifinal	L 63–68	5–1	Atlantis Resort (2,394); Nassau, Bahamas
November 26*; 2:00 pm, Versus	No. 4	vs. No. 22 Florida State; Battle 4 Atlantis 3rd place game	W 78–76 ^{OT}	6–1	Atlantis Resort (2,752); Nassau, Bahamas
December 3*; 3:15 pm, ESPN	No. 8	Arkansas; SEC/Big East Invitational	W 75–62	7–1	XL Center (14,333); Hartford, CT
December 8*; 7:00 pm, ESPN2	No. 9	No. 25 Harvard	W 67–53	8–1	Harry A. Gampel Pavilion (10,167); Storrs, CT
December 18*; 1:00 pm, SNY	No. 9	Holy Cross	W 77–40	9–1	XL Center (13,396); Hartford, CT
December 22*; 7:00 pm, SNY	No. 9	Fairfield	W 79–71	10–1	XL Center (13,821); Hartford, CT
December 28; 9:00 pm, SNY	No. 9	at South Florida	W 60–57	11–1 (1–0)	Tampa Bay Times Forum (5,705); Tampa Bay, FL
December 31; 12:00 pm, SNY	No. 9	St. John's	W 83–69	12–1 (2–0)	XL Center (16,294); Hartford, CT
January 3; 7:00 pm, SNY	No. 8	at Seton Hall	L 63–75	12–2 (2–1)	Prudential Center (8,089); Newark, NJ
January 7; 8:00 pm, SNY	No. 8	at Rutgers	L 60–67	12–3 (2–2)	Rutgers Athletic Center (7,011); Piscataway, NJ
January 9; 7:00 pm, ESPN2	No. 17	West Virginia	W 64–57	13–3 (3–2)	XL Center (15,805); Hartford, CT
January 14; 11:00 am, ESPN2	No. 17	at Notre Dame	W 67–53	14–3 (4–2)	Edmund P. Joyce Center (9,149); South Bend, IN
January 18; 7:00 pm, ESPN2	No. 13	Cincinnati	L 67–70	14–4 (4–3)	Harry A. Gampel Pavilion (10,167); Storrs, CT
January 21*; 4:00 pm, CBS	No. 13	at Tennessee	L 57–60	14–5	Thompson-Boling Arena (21,114); Knoxville, TN
January 29; 12:00 pm, SNY	No. 24	Notre Dame	L 48–50	14–6 (4–4)	XL Center (16,294); Hartford, CT
February 1; 7:00 pm, ESPN2		at No. 14 Georgetown; Rivalry	L 44–58	14–7 (4–5)	Verizon Center (15,174); Washington, DC
February 4; 12:00 pm, SNY		Seton Hall	W 69–46	15–7 (5–5)	XL Center (16,294); Hartford, CT
February 6; 7:00 pm, ESPN		at Louisville	L 59–80	15–8 (5–6)	KFC Yum! Center (21,804); Louisville, KY
February 11; 1:00 pm, CBS		at No. 2 Syracuse; Rivalry	L 67–85	15–9 (5–7)	Carrier Dome (33,430); Syracuse, NY
February 15; 7:00 pm, SNY		DePaul	W 80–54	16–9 (6–7)	Harry A. Gampel Pavilion (10,167); Storrs, CT
February 18; 12:00 pm, ESPN		No. 13 Marquette	L 64–79	16–10 (6–8)	XL Center (16,294); Hartford, CT
February 20; 7:00 pm, ESPN		at Villanova	W 73–70 ^{OT}	17–10 (7–8)	Wells Fargo Center (13,832); Philadelphia, PA
February 25; 9:00 pm, ESPN		No. 2 Syracuse; ESPN College Gameday/Rivalry	L 69–71	17–11 (7–9)	Harry A. Gampel Pavilion (10,167); Storrs, CT
February 28; 7:00 pm, SNY		at Providence	L 70–72	17–12 (7–10)	Dunkin' Donuts Center (11,031); Providence, RI
March 3; 12:00 pm, ESPN		Pittsburgh	W 74–65	18–12 (8–10)	Harry A. Gampel Pavilion (10,167); Storrs, CT
2012 Big East tournament
March 6; 12:00 pm, ESPN2		vs. DePaul; First round	W 81–67	19–12	Madison Square Garden (20,057); New York, NY
March 7; 12:00 pm, ESPN		vs. West Virginia; Second round	W 71–67 ^{OT}	20–12	Madison Square Garden (20,057); New York, NY
March 8; 12:00 pm, ESPN		vs. No. 2 Syracuse; Quarterfinals/Rivalry	L 55–58	20–13	Madison Square Garden (20,057); New York, NY
2012 NCAA tournament
March 15*; 9:20 pm, TBS	No. (S 9)	vs. (S 8) Iowa State; First round	L 64–77	20–14	KFC Yum! Center (22,131); Louisville, KY
*Non-conference game. ^{#}Rankings from AP Poll. (#) Tournament seedings in parentheses. All times are in Eastern Time (#) during NCAA Tournament is seed with Region.

== Rankings ==
Ranking movements Legend: ██ Increase in ranking ██ Decrease in ranking
	Week																			
Poll	Pre	1	2	3	4	5	6	7	8	9	10	11	12	13	14	15	16	17	18	Final
AP	4	4	4	8	9	9	8	9	8	17	13	24								
Coaches	4	4	4	10	9	10	9	9	8	16	11	19								
