= 2011–12 West Virginia Mountaineers men's basketball team =

American college basketball season

2011–12 West Virginia Mountaineers men's basketball

NCAA tournament, Round of 64
- Conference: Big East Conference
- Record: 19–14 (9–9 Big East)
- Head coach: Bob Huggins (5th season)
- Assistant coaches: Larry Harrison; Erik Martin; Jerrod Calhoun
- Home arena: WVU Coliseum

2011–12 Big East men's basketball standings
	Conf.				Overall
Team	W		L	PCT	W		L	PCT
No. 11 Marquette	14	–	4	.778	27	–	8	.771
Notre Dame	13	–	5	.722	22	–	12	.647
Cincinnati	12	–	6	.667	26	–	11	.703
No. 15 Georgetown	12	–	6	.667	24	–	9	.727
South Florida	12	–	6	.667	22	–	14	.611
West Virginia	9	–	9	.500	19	–	14	.576
Connecticut	8	–	10	.444	20	–	14	.588
Seton Hall	8	–	10	.444	21	–	13	.618
Rutgers	6	–	12	.333	14	–	18	.438
St. John's	6	–	12	.333	13	–	19	.406
Pittsburgh	5	–	13	.278	22	–	17	.564
Villanova	5	–	13	.278	13	–	19	.406
Providence	4	–	14	.222	15	–	17	.469
DePaul	3	–	15	.167	12	–	19	.387
*No. 2 Syracuse	0	–	1	.000	0	–	3	.000
**No. 17 Louisville†	0	–	8	.000	0	–	10	.000
† 2012 Big East tournament winner As of March 31, 2012; *Syracuse: 30 reg. season games, 4 postseason games vacated due to sanctions against the program; Disputed record: Syracuse–(34–3)(17–1) **Louisville: 25 reg. season games, 5 postseason games vacated due to sanctions against the program; Disputed record: Louisville–(30-10)(10-8); Rankings from AP Poll

The 2011–12 West Virginia Mountaineers men's basketball team represented West Virginia University during the 2011–12 NCAA Division I men's basketball season. The Mountaineers, led by fifth year head coach Bob Huggins, played their home games at WVU Coliseum and were members of the Big East Conference. They finished the season 19–14, 9–9 in Big East play to finish in eighth place. They lost in the second round of the Big East Basketball tournament to Connecticut. They received an at-large bid to the 2012 NCAA basketball tournament where they lost in the second round to Gonzaga.

== Roster ==
Number	Name	Position	Height	Weight	Year	Hometown
1	Dominique Ruledge	Forward	6–8	240	Junior	Newark, New Jersey
3	Juwan Staten	Guard	6–1	190	Sophomore	Dayton, Ohio
4	Jabarie Hinds	Guard	5–11	175	Freshman	Mount Vernon, New York
5	Kevin Jones	Forward	6–8	260	Senior	Mount Vernon, New York
12	Aaron Brown	Forward	6–5	220	Freshman	Darby, Pennsylvania
13	Deniz Kılıçlı	Forward	6–9	260	Junior	Istanbul, Turkey
14	Gary Browne	Guard	6–1	185	Freshman	Cupey, San Juan, Puerto Rico
20	Pat Forsythe	Center	6–11	240	Freshman	Brunswick, Ohio
22	Aric Dickerson	Guard	6–5	180	Freshman	Chicago, Illinois
23	Tommie McCune	Forward	6–8	205	Freshman	Saginaw, Michigan
24	Aaric Murray	Center	6–10	240	Junior	Philadelphia, Pennsylvania
25	Darryl Bryant	Guard	6–1	185	Senior	Brooklyn, New York
32	Paul Williamson	Guard	6–3	195	Freshman	Harts, West Virginia
34	Kevin Noreen	Forward	6–10	245	Freshman	Minneapolis, Minnesota
55	Keaton Miles	Forward	6–6	205	Freshman	Dallas, Texas

== Schedule ==
Date time, TV	Rank^{#}	Opponent^{#}	Result	Record	Site (attendance) city, state
Regular season
11/11/2011*; 9:00 pm, ESPN3		Oral Roberts	W 78–71	1–0	WVU Coliseum (8,579); Morgantown, WV
11/15/2011*; 10:00 am, ESPN		Kent State; ESPN College Tip Off Marathon	L 60–70	1–1	WVU Coliseum (5,616); Morgantown, WV
11/17/2011*; 7:00 pm, ESPN3		Alcorn State	W 97–62	2–1	WVU Coliseum (2,308); Morgantown, WV
11/22/2011*; 7:00 pm, Big East Network		vs. Morehead State	W 83–48	3–1	Charleston Civic Center (10,122); Charleston, WV
11/28/2011*; 7:00 pm, Big East Network		Akron	W 77–56	4–1	WVU Coliseum (7,334); Morgantown, WV
12/03/2011*; 9:00 pm, ESPNU		at No. 21 Mississippi State	L 62–75	4–2	Humphrey Coliseum (7,529); Starkville, MS
12/08/2011*; 9:00 pm, ESPN2		vs. Kansas State	W 85–80 ^{2OT}	5–2	Intrust Bank Arena (15,004); Wichita, KS
12/10/2011*; 7:00 pm, ESPN2		Miami (FL)	W 77–66	6–2	WVU Coliseum (12,257); Morgantown, WV
12/17/2011*; 2:00 pm, Big East Network		Texas A&M–Corpus Christi; Las Vegas Classic	W 84–64	7–2	WVU Coliseum (7,226); Morgantown, WV
12/19/2011*; 7:00 pm, Big East Network		Tennessee Tech; Las Vegas Classic	W 72–53	8–2	WVU Coliseum (6,252); Morgantown, WV
12/22/2011*; 8:00 pm, ESPN3		vs. Missouri State; Las Vegas Classic semifinals	W 70–68 ^{OT}	9–2	Orleans Arena (NA); Paradise, NV
12/23/2011*; 9:00 pm, ESPN		vs. No. 7 Baylor; Las Vegas Classic finals	L 81–83 ^{OT}	9–3	Orleans Arena (1,526); Las Vegas, NV
12/28/2011; 7:00 pm, Big East Network		Villanova	W 83–69	10–3 (1–0)	WVU Coliseum (11,262); Morgantown, WV
12/30/2011; 9:00 pm, ESPN2		at Seton Hall	L 48–67	10–4 (1–1)	Prudential Center (7,533); Newark, NJ
01/04/2012; 7:00 pm, Big East Network		at Rutgers	W 85–64	11–4 (2–1)	Louis Brown Athletic Center (4,815); Piscataway, NJ
01/07/2012; 12:00 pm, Big East Network		No. 9 Georgetown	W 74–62	12–4 (3–1)	WVU Coliseum (10,526); Morgantown, WV
01/09/2012; 7:00 pm, ESPN2		at No. 17 Connecticut	L 57–64	12–5 (3–2)	XL Center (15,805); Hartford, CT
01/14/2012; 2:00 pm, Big East Network		Rutgers	W 84–60	13–5 (4–2)	WVU Coliseum (13,820); Morgantown, WV
01/18/2012*; 7:30 pm, WOWK		vs. Marshall; Chesapeake Energy Capital Classic	W 78–62	14–5	Charleston Civic Center (12,684); Charleston, WV
01/21/2012; 3:00 pm, ESPNU		Cincinnati	W 77–74 ^{OT}	15–5 (5–2)	WVU Coliseum (14,070); Morgantown, WV
01/25/2012; 7:00 pm, ESPNU		at St. John's	L 62–78	15–6 (5–3)	Madison Square Garden (6,901); New York City, NY
01/28/2012; 1:00 pm, ESPNU		at No. 3 Syracuse	L 61–63	15–7 (5–4)	Carrier Dome (28,740); Syracuse, NY
01/30/2012; 7:00 pm, ESPN		Pittsburgh	L 66–72	15–8 (5–5)	WVU Coliseum (13,032); Morgantown, WV
02/05/2012; 12:00 pm, Big East Network		at Providence	W 87–84 ^{OT}	16–8 (6–5)	Dunkin' Donuts Center (8,122); Providence, RI
02/08/2012; 9:00 pm, ESPNU		Notre Dame	L 51–55	16–9 (6–6)	WVU Coliseum (9,258); Morgantown, WV
02/11/2012; 12:00 pm, ESPN		No. 24 Louisville	L 74–77	16–10 (6–7)	WVU Coliseum (11,254); Morgantown, WV
02/16/2012; 9:00 pm, ESPN		at Pittsburgh	W 66–48	17–10 (7–7)	Petersen Events Center (12,508); Pittsburgh, PA
02/22/2012; 7:00 pm, ESPN2		at No. 20 Notre Dame	L 44–71	17–11 (7–8)	Edmund P. Joyce Center (8,265); South Bend, IN
02/24/2012; 9:00 pm, ESPN		No. 10 Marquette	L 60–61	17–12 (7–9)	WVU Coliseum (12,087); Morgantown, WV
02/28/2012; 7:00 pm, Big East Network		DePaul	W 92–75	18–12 (8–9)	WVU Coliseum (10,255); Morgantown, WV
03/03/2012; 12:00 pm, Big East Network		at South Florida	W 50–44	19–12 (9–9)	Tampa Bay Times Forum (9,737); Tampa, FL
2012 Big East men's basketball tournament
03/07/2012; 12:00 pm, ESPN		vs. Connecticut; Second Round	L 67–71 ^{OT}	19–13	Madison Square Garden (20,057); New York City, NY
2012 NCAA tournament
03/15/2012*; 7:20 pm, TNT	No. (E 10)	vs. (E 7) Gonzaga; Second Round	L 54–77	19–14	Consol Energy Center (19,413); Pittsburgh, PA
*Non-conference game. ^{#}Rankings from AP Poll. (#) Tournament seedings in parentheses. All times are in Eastern Time (#) during NCAA Tournament is seed with Region.
