= 2011–12 Villanova Wildcats men's basketball team =

American college basketball season

2011–12 Villanova Wildcats men's basketball
- Conference: Big East Conference
- Record: 13–19 (5–13 Big East)
- Head coach: Jay Wright
- Assistant coaches: Billy Lange; Doug West; Jason Donnelly
- Home arena: The Pavilion; Wells Fargo Center

2011–12 Big East men's basketball standings
	Conf.				Overall
Team	W		L	PCT	W		L	PCT
No. 11 Marquette	14	–	4	.778	27	–	8	.771
Notre Dame	13	–	5	.722	22	–	12	.647
Cincinnati	12	–	6	.667	26	–	11	.703
No. 15 Georgetown	12	–	6	.667	24	–	9	.727
South Florida	12	–	6	.667	22	–	14	.611
West Virginia	9	–	9	.500	19	–	14	.576
Connecticut	8	–	10	.444	20	–	14	.588
Seton Hall	8	–	10	.444	21	–	13	.618
Rutgers	6	–	12	.333	14	–	18	.438
St. John's	6	–	12	.333	13	–	19	.406
Pittsburgh	5	–	13	.278	22	–	17	.564
Villanova	5	–	13	.278	13	–	19	.406
Providence	4	–	14	.222	15	–	17	.469
DePaul	3	–	15	.167	12	–	19	.387
*No. 2 Syracuse	0	–	1	.000	0	–	3	.000
**No. 17 Louisville†	0	–	8	.000	0	–	10	.000
† 2012 Big East tournament winner As of March 31, 2012; *Syracuse: 30 reg. season games, 4 postseason games vacated due to sanctions against the program; Disputed record: Syracuse–(34–3)(17–1) **Louisville: 25 reg. season games, 5 postseason games vacated due to sanctions against the program; Disputed record: Louisville–(30-10)(10-8); Rankings from AP Poll

The 2011–12 Villanova Wildcats men's basketball team represented Villanova University in the 2011–12 college basketball season. Villanova was led by eleventh year head coach Jay Wright. The Wildcats participated in the Big East Conference and played their home games at The Pavilion with some select home games at the Wells Fargo Center. The Wildcats finished with a record of 13–19 overall, 5–13 in Big East play for a tie for fourteenth-place finish. This was Wright's worst season at Nova and the only Nova team coached by Wright that would not play in any of the post-season tournaments. They lost in the 2nd round in the 2012 Big East men's basketball tournament to South Florida. They were not invited to a postseason tournament for the first time since 1998, leading to some speculation that Wright's job might be in jeopardy.

== Roster ==
2011–12 Villanova Wildcats men's basketball team
Players
Coaches

Pos.	#	Name	Height	Weight	Year	Hometown
G	2	Maalik Wayns	6 ft 1 in (1.85 m)	185 lb (84 kg)	Jr	Philadelphia
G	3	Tyrone Johnson	6 ft 3 in (1.91 m)	185 lb (84 kg)	Fr	Plainfield, New Jersey
G	4	Darrun Hilliard	6 ft 6 in (1.98 m)	205 lb (93 kg)	Fr	Bethlehem, Pennsylvania
G	12	Nick McMahon	6 ft 0 in (1.83 m)	165 lb (75 kg)	So	Colts Neck, New Jersey
F/C	13	Mouphtaou Yarou	6 ft 9 in (2.06 m)	215 lb (98 kg)	Jr	Natitingou, Benin
G	20	Dallas Ouano	6 ft 0 in (1.83 m)	190 lb (86 kg)	Sr	Holmdel, New Jersey
F	21	Markus Kennedy	6 ft 9 in (2.06 m)	260 lb (118 kg)	Fr	Yeadon, Pennsylvania
F	22	JayVaughn Pinkston	6 ft 7 in (2.01 m)	260 lb (118 kg)	RS Fr	Brooklyn, New York
G	23	Dominic Cheek	6 ft 6 in (1.98 m)	190 lb (86 kg)	Jr	Jersey City, New Jersey
G	24	Achraf Yacoubou	6 ft 4 in (1.93 m)	210 lb (95 kg)	Fr	Bronx, New York
F/C	25	Maurice Sutton	6 ft 11 in (2.11 m)	220 lb (100 kg)	RS Jr	Upper Marlboro, Maryland
G	32	James Bell	6 ft 6 in (1.98 m)	225 lb (102 kg)	So	Orlando, Florida

Head coach

- Jay Wright (Bucknell)

Assistant coach(es)

- Billy Lange (Rowan)
- Doug West (Villanova)
- Jason Donnelly (Muhlenberg)

Legend

- (C) Team captain
- (S) Suspended
- (I) Ineligible
- (W) Walk-on
- Injured
- Current redshirt

Roster
Last update: 2011-11-12

== Rankings ==
Ranking movement Legend: ██ Increase in ranking. ██ Decrease in ranking. ██ No Change In Ranking
Poll	Pre	Wk 1	Wk 2	Wk 3	Wk 4	Wk 5	Wk 6	Wk 7	Wk 8	Wk 9	Wk 10	Wk 11	Wk 12	Wk 13	Wk 14	Wk 15	Wk 16	Wk 17	Wk 18	Final
AP	RV	RV	RV	RV	RV	NR	NR													
Coaches	RV	RV	RV	RV	NR	NR	NR													

== Schedule ==
Date time, TV	Rank^{#}	Opponent^{#}	Result	Record	Site (attendance) city, state
Exhibition
11/08/2011*; 7:00 pm		NYIT	W 91–58	–	Wells Fargo Center (5,127); Philadelphia
Regular season
11/11/2011*; 7:00 pm		Monmouth	W 106–70	1–0	The Pavilion (6,500); Villanova, Pennsylvania
11/15/2011*; 7:00 pm, ESPN3		La Salle; Big 5 game	W 76–70 ^{OT}	2–0	The Pavilion (6,500); Villanova, Pennsylvania
11/18/2011*; 7:00 pm, ESPN3		Delaware	W 79–69	3–0	The Pavilion (6,500); Villanova, Pennsylvania
11/24/2011*; 7:00 pm, ESPN2		vs. UC Riverside; 76 Classic First Round	W 71–46	4–0	Anaheim Convention Center (1,427); Anaheim, California
11/25/2011*; 2:30 pm, ESPN		vs. Saint Louis; 76 Classic semifinals	L 68–80	4–1	Anaheim Convention Center (2,087); Anaheim, California
11/27/2011*; 6:30 pm, ESPNU		vs. Santa Clara; 76 Classic 3rd place game	L 64–65	4–2	Anaheim Convention Center (N/A); Anaheim, California
12/03/2011*; 7:00 pm, ESPN3		Penn; Big 5 Game	W 73–65	5–2	The Pavilion (6,500); Villanova, Pennsylvania
12/06/2011*; 7:00 pm, ESPN		vs. No. 10 Missouri; Jimmy V Classic	L 71–81	5–3	Madison Square Garden (8,231); New York City
12/10/2011*; 5:00 pm, ESPN2		at Temple; Big 5 Game	L 67–78	5–4	Liacouras Center (10,206); Philadelphia, Pennsylvania
12/13/2011*; 7:00 pm, ESPN2		Boston University	W 68–43	6–4	Wells Fargo Center (8,313); Philadelphia
12/17/2011*; 7:00 pm, CBSSN		at Saint Joseph's; Big 5 Game	L 58–74	6–5	Hagan Arena (4,200); Philadelphia
12/22/2011*; 7:00 pm		American	W 73–52	7–5	The Pavilion (6,500); Villanova, Pennsylvania
12/28/2011; 7:00 pm, WPHL		at West Virginia	L 69–83	7–6 (0–1)	WVU Coliseum (11,262); Morgantown, West Virginia
01/01/2012; 1:00 pm, ESPNU		at No. 14 Marquette	L 77–81	7–7 (0–2)	BMO Harris Bradley Center (14,550); Milwaukee
01/05/2012; 8:00 pm, WPHL		South Florida	L 57–74	7–8 (0–3)	The Pavilion (6,500); Villanova, Pennsylvania
01/08/2012; 12:00 pm, WPHL		DePaul	W 87–71	8–8 (1–3)	The Pavilion (6,500); Villanova, Pennsylvania
01/11/2012; 7:00 pm, ESPN2		No. 1 Syracuse	L 66–79	8–9 (1–4)	Wells Fargo Arena (14,877); Philadelphia
01/14/2012; 12:00 pm, WPHL		at Cincinnati	L 78–82	8–10 (1–5)	Fifth Third Arena (10,205); Cincinnati
01/18/2012; 7:00 pm, ESPNU		Seton Hall	W 84–76	9–10 (2–5)	The Pavilion (6,500); Villanova, Pennsylvania
01/21/2012; 1:00 pm, ESPNU		at St. John's	W 79–76	10–10 (3–5)	Madison Square Garden (11,430); New York City
01/25/2012; 1:00 pm, ESPN		at Louisville	L 74–84	10–11 (3–5)	KFC Yum! Center (21,219); Louisville, Kentucky
01/28/2012; 12:00 pm, ESPN2		No. 17 Marquette	L 78–82	10–12 (3–7)	Wells Fargo Center (15,578); Philadelphia
02/05/2012; 2:00 pm, ESPN		at Pittsburgh	L 70–79	10–13 (3–8)	Peterson Events Center (21,219); Pittsburgh
02/07/2012; 8:00 pm, WPHL		Providence	W 74–72	11–13 (4–8)	The Pavilion (6,500); Villanova, Pennsylvania
02/15/2012; 7:00 pm, ESPN2		at South Florida	L 51–65	11–14 (4–9)	Tampa Bay Times Forum (4,636); Tampa, Florida
02/18/2012; 8:00 pm, ESPNU		No. 23 Notre Dame	L 70–74 ^{OT}	11–15 (4–10)	Wells Fargo Center (15,939); Philadelphia
02/20/2012; 7:00 pm, ESPN		Connecticut	L 70–74 ^{OT}	11–16 (4–11)	Wells Fargo Center (13,832); Philadelphia
02/25/2012; 2:00 pm, CBS		at Georgetown	L 46–67	11–17 (4–12)	Verizon Center (19,277); Washington, D.C.
03/01/2012; 9:00 pm, ESPN2		at Rutgers	W 77–71	12–17 (5–12)	The RAC (5,496); Piscataway, New Jersey
03/02/2012; 2:00 pm, ESPN		Cincinnati	L 68–72	12–18 (5–13)	The Pavilion (6,500); Villanova, Pennsylvania
Big East tournament
03/06/2012; 9:00 pm, ESPNU		vs. Rutgers; First Round	W 70–49	13–18	Madison Square Garden (20,057); New York City
03/07/2012; 9:00 pm, ESPN		vs. South Florida; Second Round	L 47–56	13–19	Madison Square Garden (20,057); New York City
*Non-conference game. ^{#}Rankings from AP Poll. (#) Tournament seedings in parentheses. All times are in Eastern Time.
