= 2011–12 St. John's Red Storm men's basketball team =

American college basketball season

2011–12 St. John's Red Storm men's basketball
- Conference: Big East Conference (1979–2013)
- Record: 13–19 (6–12 Big East)
- Head coach: Steve Lavin (2nd year)
- Assistant coaches: Mike Dunlap; Tony Chiles; Rico Hines
- Home arena: Carnesecca Arena; Madison Square Garden

2011–12 Big East men's basketball standings
	Conf.				Overall
Team	W		L	PCT	W		L	PCT
No. 11 Marquette	14	–	4	.778	27	–	8	.771
Notre Dame	13	–	5	.722	22	–	12	.647
Cincinnati	12	–	6	.667	26	–	11	.703
No. 15 Georgetown	12	–	6	.667	24	–	9	.727
South Florida	12	–	6	.667	22	–	14	.611
West Virginia	9	–	9	.500	19	–	14	.576
Connecticut	8	–	10	.444	20	–	14	.588
Seton Hall	8	–	10	.444	21	–	13	.618
Rutgers	6	–	12	.333	14	–	18	.438
St. John's	6	–	12	.333	13	–	19	.406
Pittsburgh	5	–	13	.278	22	–	17	.564
Villanova	5	–	13	.278	13	–	19	.406
Providence	4	–	14	.222	15	–	17	.469
DePaul	3	–	15	.167	12	–	19	.387
*No. 2 Syracuse	0	–	1	.000	0	–	3	.000
**No. 17 Louisville†	0	–	8	.000	0	–	10	.000
† 2012 Big East tournament winner As of March 31, 2012; *Syracuse: 30 reg. season games, 4 postseason games vacated due to sanctions against the program; Disputed record: Syracuse–(34–3)(17–1) **Louisville: 25 reg. season games, 5 postseason games vacated due to sanctions against the program; Disputed record: Louisville–(30-10)(10-8); Rankings from AP Poll

The 2011–12 St. John's Red Storm men's basketball team represented St. John's University during the 2011–12 NCAA Division I men's basketball season. The team was coached by Steve Lavin in his second year at the school. St. John's home games were played at Carnesecca Arena and Madison Square Garden and the team was a member of the Big East Conference.

== Off season ==
=== Departures ===
Name	Number	Pos.	Height	Weight	Year	Hometown	Notes
Dwayne Polee II	0	F	6'7"	193	Freshman	Los Angeles, California	Transferred to San Diego State
D. J. Kennedy	1	F	6'5"	214	Senior	Pittsburgh, Pennsylvania	Graduated
Malik Boothe	3	G	5'9"	184	Senior	Queens, New York	Graduated
Sean Evans	5	F	6'8"	259	Senior	Philadelphia, Pennsylvania	Graduated
Quincy Roberts	10	G	6'5"	196	RS Sophomore	Harrisburg, Pennsylvania	Transferred to Grambling State
Nurideen Lindsay	10	G	6'4"	185	Sophomore	Philadelphia, Pennsylvania	Transferred to Rider (mid-season)
Dwight Hardy	11	G	6'2"	187	Senior	Bronx, New York	Graduated
Dele Coker	15	C	6'10"	257	Senior	Lagos, Nigeria	Graduated
Paris Horne	23	G	6'3"	189	Senior	Middletown, Delaware	Graduated
Justin Burrell	24	F	6'8"	244	Senior	Bronx, New York	Graduated
Justin Brownlee	32	F	6'7"	232	Senior	Tifton, Georgia	Graduated
Kevin Clark	42	G	6'2"	204	Senior	Dunmore, Pennsylvania	Graduated
Rob Thomas	55	F	6'6"	247	RS Senior	Harlem, New York	Graduated

=== Class of 2011 signees ===
College recruiting information
Name	Hometown	School	Height	Weight	Commit date
Sir'Dominic Pointer; SF	Detroit, MI	Quality Education Academy	6 ft 6 in (1.98 m)	195 lb (88 kg)	Nov 11, 2010
Sir'Dominic Pointer; SF	Recruit ratings: Scout: Rivals: (96)				
Maurice Harkless; SF	Queens, NY	South Kent School	6 ft 6 in (1.98 m)	200 lb (91 kg)	Nov 10, 2010
Maurice Harkless; SF	Recruit ratings: Scout: Rivals: (96)				
D'Angelo Harrison; SG	Missouri City, TX	Dulles High School	6 ft 3 in (1.91 m)	180 lb (82 kg)	Nov 10, 2010
D'Angelo Harrison; SG	Recruit ratings: Scout: Rivals: (94)				
Amir Garrett; SF	Los Angeles, CA	Bridgton Academy	6 ft 6 in (1.98 m)	190 lb (86 kg)	Nov 17, 2010
Amir Garrett; SF	Recruit ratings: Scout: Rivals: (92)				
Phil Greene IV; SG	Chicago, IL	IMG Academy	6 ft 2 in (1.88 m)	170 lb (77 kg)	Apr 14, 2011
Phil Greene IV; SG	Recruit ratings: Scout: Rivals: (91)				
Nurideen Lindsay; SG	Philadelphia, PA	Redlands Community College	6 ft 4 in (1.93 m)	185 lb (84 kg)	Nov 10, 2010
Nurideen Lindsay; SG	Recruit ratings: Rivals: (JC)				
God'sgift Achiuwa; C	Port Harcourt, Nigeria	Erie Community College	6 ft 8 in (2.03 m)	236 lb (107 kg)	Apr 28, 2011
God'sgift Achiuwa; C	Recruit ratings: Rivals: (JC)				
Overall recruit ranking:
Note: In many cases, Scout, Rivals, 247Sports, On3, and ESPN may conflict in their listings of height and weight.; In these cases, the average was taken. ESPN grades are on a 100-point scale.; Sources: "2011 Team Ranking". Rivals.

== Roster ==
2011–12 St. John's Red Storm men's basketball team
Players
Coaches

Pos.	#	Name	Height	Weight	Year	Previous school	Hometown
G	1	Phil Greene	6 ft 2 in (1.88 m)	180 lb (82 kg)	Fr	IMG Academy	Chicago, IL
F/C	3	God'sgift Achiuwa	6 ft 8 in (2.03 m)	236 lb (107 kg)	Jr	Erie C.C.	Port Harcourt, Nigeria
F	4	Maurice Harkless	6 ft 8 in (2.03 m)	208 lb (94 kg)	Fr	South Kent	Queens, NY
G	10	Nurideen Lindsey (T)	6 ft 3 in (1.91 m)	180 lb (82 kg)	So	Overbrook/Redlands C.C.	Philadelphia, PA
G	11	D'Angelo Harrison	6 ft 3 in (1.91 m)	203 lb (92 kg)	Fr	Dulles	Missouri City, TX
G/F	15	Sir'Dominic Pointer	6 ft 5 in (1.96 m)	196 lb (89 kg)	Fr	Quality Education Academy	Detroit, MI
F	22	Amir Garrett	6 ft 6 in (1.98 m)	190 lb (86 kg)	Fr	Bridgton Academy	Los Angeles, CA
G	23	Anteh Aryee (W)	6 ft 2 in (1.88 m)	183 lb (83 kg)	Fr	Arlington Christian	Fairburn, GA
G	25	Gerard Rivers (W)	6 ft 0 in (1.83 m)	175 lb (79 kg)	Fr	Paraclete	Lancaster, CA
G	30	Jamal White (W)	6 ft 4 in (1.93 m)	200 lb (91 kg)	Jr	Roosevelt/Long Island	Roosevelt, NY
G	31	Malik Stith (T)	5 ft 11 in (1.8 m)	185 lb (84 kg)	Jr	Bridgton Academy	Hempstead, NY
F	40	Sam Sealy (W)	6 ft 8 in (2.03 m)	195 lb (88 kg)	Fr	Longwood	Medford, NY
G	55	Boris Brakalov (W)	6 ft 2 in (1.88 m)	185 lb (84 kg)	Sr	National Trade and Banking	Sofia, Bulgaria

Head coach

- Steve Lavin (Chapman)

Assistant coach(es)

- Mike Dunlap
- Rico Hines
- Tony Chiles
- Gene Keady (special asst.)

Legend

- (C) Team captain
- (S) Suspended
- (I) Ineligible
- (W) Walk-on
- Injured
- Current redshirt

== Schedule ==
Date time, TV	Rank^{#}	Opponent^{#}	Result	Record	Site (attendance) city, state
Exhibition
October 25*; 7:00pm, SNY		C.W. Post	W 110–80		Carnesecca Arena (4,025); Queens, NY
November 1*; 7:00pm, ESPN3		St. Mary's (MD)	W 77–70		Carnesecca Arena (3,088); Queens, NY
Regular Season
November 7*; 7:00pm, ESPNU		William & Mary; 2K Sports Classic opening round	W 74–59	1–0	Carnesecca Arena (4,142); Queens, NY
November 9*; 7:00pm, ESPN2		Lehigh; 2K Sports Classic opening round	W 78–73	2–0	Carnesecca Arena (4,409); Queens, NY
November 13*; 2:00pm, ESPNU		UMBC	W 82–59	3–0	Carnesecca Arena (4,424); Queens, NY
November 17*; 9:30pm, ESPN2		vs. No. 15 Arizona; 2K Sports Classic semifinal	L 72–81	3–1	Madison Square Garden (9,036); New York, NY
November 18*; 4:30pm, ESPN2		vs. No. 19 Texas A&M; 2K Sports Classic consolation	L 57–58	3–2	Madison Square Garden (6,338); New York, NY
November 22*; 9:00pm, ESPN3		St. Francis (NY)	W 63–48	4–2	Carnesecca Arena (3,922); Queens, NY
November 26*; 4:00pm, ESPN3		Northeastern	L 64–78	4–3	Carnesecca Arena (5,207); Queens, NY
December 1*; 7:30pm, ESPN2		at No. 1 Kentucky; SEC–Big East Challenge	L 59–81	4–4	Rupp Arena (24,119); Lexington, KY
December 5*; 7:00pm, ESPN2		at Detroit	L 63–69	4–5	Calihan Hall (5,377); Detroit, MI
December 17*; 2:30pm, MSG		Fordham; Madison Square Garden Holiday Festival	W 56–50	5–5	Madison Square Garden; New York, NY
December 21*; 7:00pm		Texas-Pan American	W 66–61	6–5	Carnesecca Arena (3,821); Queens, NY
December 27; 7:00pm, MSG		Providence	W 91–67	7–5 (1–0)	Carnesecca Arena (5,602); Queens, NY
December 31; 12:00pm, SNY		at No. 9 Connecticut	L 69–83	7–6 (1–1)	XL Center (16,294); Hartford, CT
January 3; 7:00pm, ESPNU		No. 11 Louisville	L 58–73	7–7 (1–2)	Madison Square Garden (9,258); New York, NY
January 7; 2:00pm, MSG		at Cincinnati	W 57–55	8–7 (2–2)	Fifth Third Arena (8,820); Cincinnati, OH
January 11; 7:00pm, ESPNU		at No. 25 Marquette	L 64–83	8–8 (2–3)	Bradley Center (14,484); Milwaukee, WI
January 15; 12:00pm, MSG		No. 11 Georgetown	L 49–69	8–9 (2–4)	Madison Square Garden (11,475); New York, NY
January 18; 7:00pm, SNY		at South Florida	L 49–64	8–10 (2–5)	Tampa Bay Times Forum (3,145); Tampa, FL
January 21; 1:00pm, ESPNU		Villanova	L 76–79 ^{OT}	8–11 (2–6)	Madison Square Garden (11,430); New York, NY
January 25; 7:00pm, ESPNU		West Virginia	W 78–62	9–11 (3–6)	Madison Square Garden (6,901); New York, NY
January 28*; 12:00pm, ESPN		at No. 8 Duke	L 76–83	9–12	Cameron Indoor Stadium (9,314); Durham, NC
February 1; 8:30pm, SNY		at DePaul	W 87–81	9–12 (4–6)	Allstate Arena (7,994); Rosemont, IL
February 4; 12:00pm, ESPN		No. 2 Syracuse	L 70–95	9–13 (4–7)	Madison Square Garden (19,979); New York, NY
February 8; 7:00pm, ESPNU		Cincinnati	L 56–74	9–14 (4–8)	Madison Square Garden (7,618); New York, NY
February 12; 1:00pm, ESPN		at No. 12 Georgetown	L 61–71	9–15 (4–9)	Verizon Center (12,285); Washington, DC
February 14; 7:00pm, SNY		at Seton Hall	L 64–94	10–16 (4–10)	Prudential Center; Newark, NJ
February 18*; 1:00pm, CBS		UCLA	W 66–63	11–16	Madison Square Garden (7,305 ) New York, NY
February 20; 9:00pm, ESPNU		DePaul	W 79–72	12–16 (5–10)	Carnesecca Arena (5,110); Queens, NY
February 25; 12:00pm, ESPN2		No. 20 Notre Dame	W 61–58	13–16 (6–10)	Madison Square Garden (11,436); New York, NY
February 29; 7:00pm, ESPNU		at Pittsburgh	L 69–89	13–17 (6–11)	Petersen Events Center (9,449); Pittsburgh, PA
March 3; 8:00pm, MSG		at Rutgers	L 58–61	13–18 (6–12)	Louis Brown Athletic Center (7,349); Piscataway, NJ
Big East tournament
March 6; 2:00 pm, ESPN2		vs. Pittsburgh; First round	L 59–73	13–19	Madison Square Garden (20,507); New York, NY
*Non-conference game. ^{#}Rankings from AP Poll. (#) Tournament seedings in parentheses.

== Team players drafted into the NBA ==
Round	Pick	Player	NBA club
1	15	Maurice Harkless	Philadelphia 76ers traded to the Orlando Magic

== See also ==
- 2011–12 NCAA Division I men's basketball rankings
