= 2011–12 DePaul Blue Demons men's basketball team =

American college basketball season

2011–12 DePaul Blue Demons men's basketball
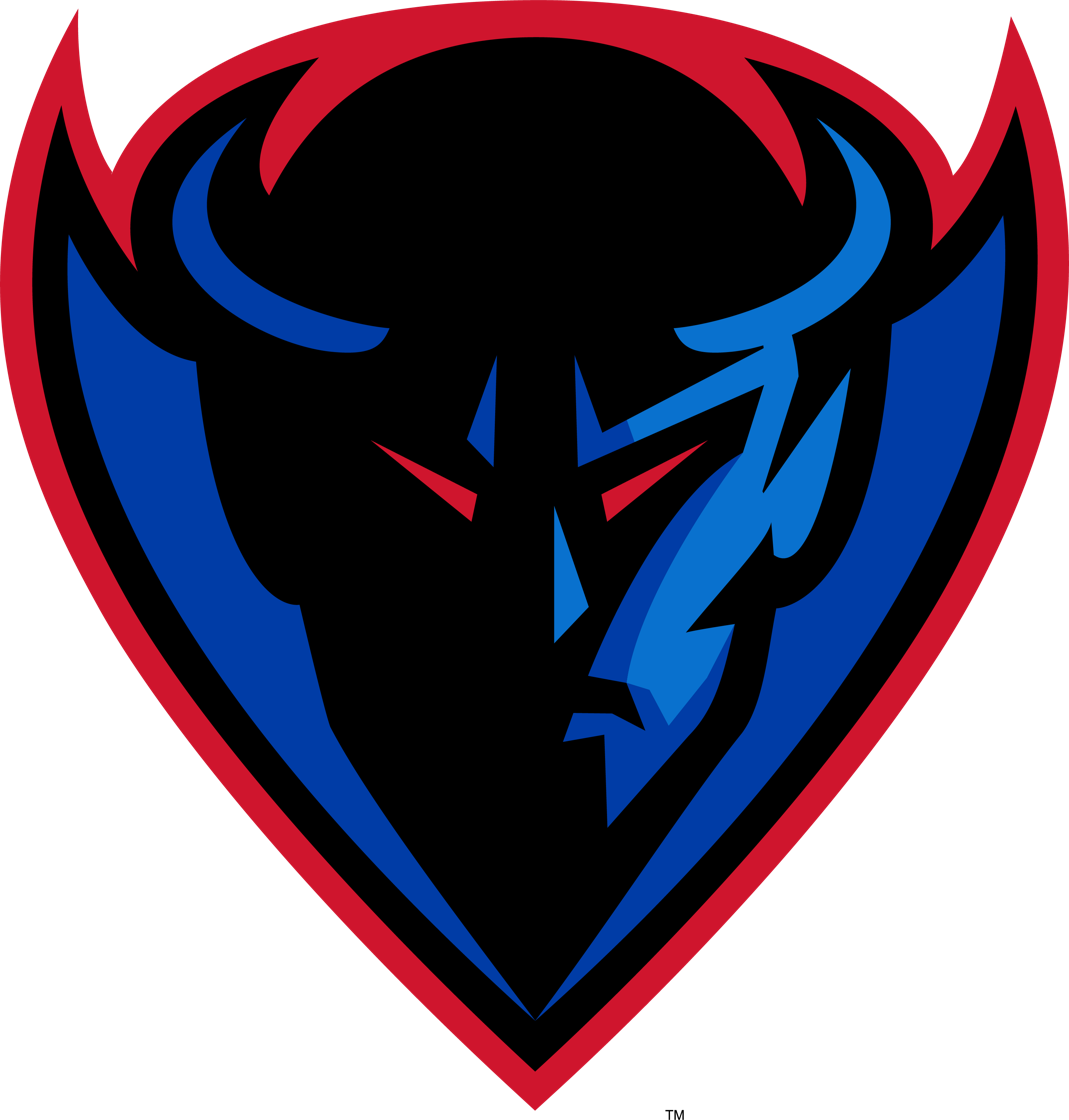
- Conference: Big East Conference (1979–2013)
- Record: 12–19 (3–15 Big East)
- Head coach: Oliver Purnell
- Assistant coaches: Ron Bradley; Brian Ellerbe; Billy Garrett
- Home arena: Allstate Arena; McGrath-Phillips Arena

2011–12 Big East men's basketball standings
	Conf.				Overall
Team	W		L	PCT	W		L	PCT
No. 11 Marquette	14	–	4	.778	27	–	8	.771
Notre Dame	13	–	5	.722	22	–	12	.647
Cincinnati	12	–	6	.667	26	–	11	.703
No. 15 Georgetown	12	–	6	.667	24	–	9	.727
South Florida	12	–	6	.667	22	–	14	.611
West Virginia	9	–	9	.500	19	–	14	.576
Connecticut	8	–	10	.444	20	–	14	.588
Seton Hall	8	–	10	.444	21	–	13	.618
Rutgers	6	–	12	.333	14	–	18	.438
St. John's	6	–	12	.333	13	–	19	.406
Pittsburgh	5	–	13	.278	22	–	17	.564
Villanova	5	–	13	.278	13	–	19	.406
Providence	4	–	14	.222	15	–	17	.469
DePaul	3	–	15	.167	12	–	19	.387
*No. 2 Syracuse	0	–	1	.000	0	–	3	.000
**No. 17 Louisville†	0	–	8	.000	0	–	10	.000
† 2012 Big East tournament winner As of March 31, 2012; *Syracuse: 30 reg. season games, 4 postseason games vacated due to sanctions against the program; Disputed record: Syracuse–(34–3)(17–1) **Louisville: 25 reg. season games, 5 postseason games vacated due to sanctions against the program; Disputed record: Louisville–(30-10)(10-8); Rankings from AP Poll

The 2011–12 DePaul Blue Demons men's basketball team represented DePaul University during the 2011–12 NCAA Division I men's basketball season. The Blue Demons, led by second year head coach Oliver Purnell, played their home games at the Allstate Arena, with three home games at McGrath-Phillips Arena, and were members of the Big East Conference. They finished the season 12–19, 3–15 in Big East play to finish in last place. They lost in the first round of the Big East tournament to Connecticut.

== Preseason ==
On October 19, 2011, at Big East Media Day, DePaul was ranked last in the Big East Preseason Coaches' Poll, receiving 27 points.

== Roster ==
2012–13 DePaul Blue Demons men's basketball team
Players
Coaches

Pos.	#	Name	Height	Weight	Year	Previous school	Hometown
G	0	Worrel Clahar	5 ft 11 in (1.8 m)	179 lb (81 kg)	Jr	Sound Doctrine Christian Academy; Lawson State CC	Brooklyn, NY
G	2	Edwind McGhee	6 ft 3 in (1.91 m)	203 lb (92 kg)	So	Champaign Central HS	Champaign, IL
G	5	Joe Belcaster	6 ft 2 in (1.88 m)	161 lb (73 kg)	Jr	Morton HS	Berwyn, IL
C	10	Derrell Robertson Jr.	6 ft 10 in (2.08 m)	233 lb (106 kg)	Fr	Mendenhall High School	Pinola, MS
G	11	Jeremiah Kelly	6 ft 0 in (1.83 m)	166 lb (75 kg)	Sr	American Christian	Chicago, IL
F	12	Cleveland Melvin	6 ft 8 in (2.03 m)	205 lb (93 kg)	So	Lake Clifton HS	Baltimore, MD
F	15	Moses Morgan	6 ft 6 in (1.98 m)	218 lb (99 kg)	So	Palo Verde HS	Las Vegas, NV
G	20	Brandon Young	6 ft 3 in (1.91 m)	193 lb (88 kg)	So	Friendship Collegiate Academy	Baltimore, MD
F	21	Jamee Crockett	6 ft 4 in (1.93 m)	202 lb (92 kg)	Fr	Crete-Monee	Chicago, IL
F	23	Donnavan Kirk	6 ft 9 in (2.06 m)	222 lb (101 kg)	Sr	Detroit Country Day School; University of Miami	Pontiac, MI
G	32	Charles McKinney	6 ft 3 in (1.91 m)	182 lb (83 kg)	Fr	Quality Education Academy	Evanston, IL
C	33	Krys Faber	6 ft 10 in (2.08 m)	258 lb (117 kg)	Sr	Ribet Academy	Palmdale, CA

Head coach

- Oliver Purnell (Old Dominion)

Assistant coach(es)

- Ron Bradley (Bridgewater State)
- Brian Ellerbe (Rutgers)
- Billy Garrett (Indianapolis)

Legend

- (C) Team captain
- (S) Suspended
- (I) Ineligible
- (W) Walk-on
- Injured
- Current redshirt

Roster

== Schedule ==
Date time, TV	Opponent	Result	Record	Site (attendance) city, state
Exhibition
11/05/2011*; 7:30 pm	Lewis	W 70–63	–	McGrath-Phillips Arena (2,752); Chicago, IL
Regular season
11/11/2011*; 8:00 pm	UTPA	W 91–72	1–0	McGrath-Phillips Arena (4,001); Chicago, IL
11/14/2011*; 7:30 pm	Mississippi Valley State	W 80–70	2-0	McGrath-Phillips Arena (3,286); Chicago, IL
11/24/2011*; 1:00 pm, ESPN2	vs. Minnesota; Old Spice Classic quarterfinals	L 85–86	2–1	HP Field House (3,170); Buena Vista, FL
11/25/2011*; 1:30 pm, ESPNU	vs. Texas Tech; Old Spice Classic consolation 2nd round	W 76–70	3-1	HP Field House (3,377); Buena Vista, FL
11/27/2011*; 1:00 pm, ESPNU	vs. Arizona State; Old Spice Classic 5th place game	W 68–64	4-1	HP Field House (1,728); Buena Vista, FL
12/01/2011*; 8:00 pm, ESPNU	Ole Miss; SEC–Big East Challenge	L 68–70	4-2	Allstate Arena (7,129); Rosemont, IL
12/05/2011*; 8:00 pm, WCUU	Milwaukee	L 76–87	4–3	Allstate Arena (6,661); Rosemont, IL
12/07/2011*; 7:00 pm, LPTV	at Loyola-Chicago	W 69–58	5–3	Gentile Arena (4,186); Chicago, IL
12/10/2011*; 1:00 pm, WCUU	Chicago State	W 102–95	6–3	Allstate Arena (6,245); Rosemont, IL
12/14/2011*; 8:00 pm	at Northern Illinois	W 75–52	7–3	NIU Convocation Center (811); DeKalb, IL
12/17/2011*; 7:00 pm	Arkansas–Pine Bluff	W 81-62	8–3	McGrath-Phillips Arena (3,522); Chicago, IL
12/21/2011*; 7:30 pm	Cal Poly	W 63-58	9–3	Allstate Arena (8,254); Rosemont, IL
01/01/2012; 4:00 pm, Big East Network/WCUU	No. 1 Syracuse	L 68–87	9–4 (0-1)	Allstate Arena (12,102); Rosemont, IL
01/05/2012; 8:00 pm, ESPN2	Pittsburgh	W 84–81	10–4 (1–1)	Allstate Arena (8,110); Rosemont, IL
01/08/2012; 11:00 am, Big East Network/WCUU/ESPN3	at Villanova	L 71–87	10–5 (1–2)	The Pavilion (6,500); Villanova, PA
01/10/2012; 6:00 pm, ESPN3	at Seton Hall	L 73–94	10–6 (1–3)	Prudential Center (6,840); Newark, NJ
01/14/2012; 3:00 pm, Big East Network/WCUU/ESPN3	at No. 14/15 Louisville	L 59–76	10–7 (1–4)	KFC Yum! Center (21,223); Louisville, KY
01/17/2012; 6:00 pm, ESPN2	No. 10/12 Georgetown	L 75–83	10–8 (1–5)	Allstate Arena (8,322); Rosemont, IL
01/22/2012; 1:00 pm, ESPN3	South Florida	L 59–75	10–9 (1–6)	Allstate Arena (8,002); Rosemont, IL
01/25/2012; 6:00 pm, Big East Network/WCUU/ESPN3	at Rutgers	W 69-64	11–9 (2–6)	Rutgers Athletic Center (4,662); Piscataway, NJ
02/01/2012; 7:30 pm, Big East Network/WCUU/ESPN3	St. John's	L 81–87	11–10 (2–7)	Allstate Arena (7,994); Rosemont, IL
02/04/2012; 6:00 pm, Big East Network/WCUU/ESPN3	Cincinnati	L 66–74	11-11 (2–8)	Fifth Third Arena (10,450); Cincinnati, OH
02/06/2012; 8:00 pm, ESPNU	No. 18/19 Marquette	L 76–89	11–12 (2–9)	Allstate Arena (9,276); Rosemont, IL
02/11/2012; 6:00 pm, Big East Network/WCUU/ESPN3	at Notre Dame	L 76–84	11–13 (2–10)	Edmund P. Joyce Center (9,149); Notre Dame, IN
02/15/2012; 6:00 pm, Big East Network/WCUU/ESPN3	Connecticut	L 54-80	11–14 (2–11)	Gampel Pavilion (10,167); Storrs, CT
02/18/2012; 11:00 am, Big East Network/WCUU/ESPN3	No. 19/18 Louisville	L 82-90 ^{OT}	11–15 (2–12)	Allstate Arena (13,674); Rosemont, IL
02/20/2012; 8:00 pm, ESPNU	St. John's	L 72–79	11–16 (2–13)	Carnesecca Arena (5,110); Queens, NY
02/25/2012; 1:00 pm, ESPN3	Providence	L 71–73	11–17 (2–14)	Allstate Arena (8,842); Rosemont, IL
02/28/2012; 6:00 pm, Big East Network/WCUU/ESPN3	at West Virginia	L 75-92	11–18 (2–15)	WVU Coliseum (10,255); Morgantown, WV
03/03/2012; 5:00 pm, Big East Network/WCUU/ESPN3	at Seton Hall	W 86-58	12–18 (3–15)	Allstate Arena (8,412); Rosemont, IL
2012 Big East men's basketball tournament
03/06/2012; 11:00 am, ESPNU	vs. Connecticut; First Round	L 67–81	12–19	Madison Square Garden (N/A); New York City, NY
*Non-conference game. ^{#}Rankings from AP Poll. (#) Tournament seedings in parentheses. All times are in Central Time.
