= Rutgers–Seton Hall men's basketball rivalry =

College sports rivalry

- Rutgers Scarlet Knights Seton Hall Pirates
- First meeting: February 4, 1916; Rutgers 40, Seton Hall 20
- Latest meeting: December 13, 2025; Seton Hall 81, Rutgers 59
- Next meeting: December 12, 2026

Statistics
- Total meetings: 76
- All-time series: Seton Hall leads, 43–33
- Largest victory: Rutgers, 81–49 (1998)
- Longest win streak: Seton Hall, 7 (1986–1996)
- Current win streak: Seton Hall, 1 (2025–present)

Locations of Rutgers and Seton Hall

The Rutgers–Seton Hall men's basketball rivalry, also known as the Garden State Hardwood Classic, is an intercollegiate basketball intrastate rivalry between the Rutgers Scarlet Knights of Rutgers University in Piscataway, NJ and Seton Hall Pirates of Seton Hall University in Newark, NJ. The series dates to 1916 and the teams have met continuously since 1996, with the exception of 2020 due to the COVID-19 pandemic. Former conference opponents in the Big East, Rutgers left for the American Athletic Conference in 2013 and then the Big Ten in 2014, while Seton Hall continued in the restructured Big East as part of the 2010–2014 NCAA conference realignment. Since changing conferences, the schools have continued to meet annually in the non-conference slate.

The rivalry is a trophy game, with the Garden State Hardwood Classic trophy at stake. The 33-pound wooden memento, made from reclaimed Asbury Park boardwalk planks, is fashioned in the shape of New Jersey with the teams' logos imprinted on it.

== Series History ==
While the teams met intermittently before, the series began to be played more regularly in the 1970s on a near-annual basis. Rutgers joined the Pirates in the Big East Conference in 1995, ensuring an annual matchup, including several years with a regular season home-and-home. In the early 2000s, a revival in Scarlet Knight fortunes led to several high-profile and heated games between the rivals. The teams continued to meet annually in the non-conference slate after diverging paths in conference realignment.

After the 2020 game was not scheduled due to the COVID-19 pandemic, the teams squabbled about whether to continue the rivalry. Rutgers had hammered Seton Hall in their previous 2019 meeting in Piscataway but Seton Hall did not schedule the Scarlet Knights for 2020, using the rationale that they could not have fans in the arena due to COVID-19 restrictions. Rutgers fans accused the Hall of ducking what turned out to be its first NCAA Tournament team in 30 years in order to avoid a second-straight loss. Rutgers’ stance was that it was willing to play at Seton Hall last season and that they should resume the series in Piscataway per the terms of the contract. Seton Hall continued to insist the game be played in Newark or not at all. Ultimately, the Scarlet Knights conceded that the 2021 game would be played in Newark.

Once played, the No. 23-ranked Pirates won 77–63. With the win, Seton Hall coach Kevin Willard moved past P.J. Carlesimo into second place (213 wins) on the program's all-time coaching wins list, behind only Naismith Hall of Famer Honey Russell (294 wins). Seton Hall also took strides to limit the number of Rutgers fans at the Prudential Center by boxing them out from getting tickets through the normal channels and only 1,500 Scarlet-clad faithful attended. Nonetheless, Seton Hall's efforts reduced the number from the 2016 and 2018 sellouts, in which there were roughly 3,000 Rutgers supporters. The following year, Seton Hall won its second consecutive game in the series in a low-scoring 45–43 contest and the first time victory in Piscataway since 2015.

== Rival Accomplishments ==
The following summarizes the accomplishments of the two programs.

Team	Rutgers Scarlet Knights	Seton Hall Pirates
NCAA National Titles	0	0
NCAA Final Four Appearances	1	1
NCAA Tournament Appearances	8	14
NCAA Tournament Record	6–9	16–14
Conference Tournament Titles	4	3
Conference Championships	9	4
Consensus First Team All-Americans	1	3
Naismith Players of the Year	0	0
All-time Program Record	1,308–1,265	1,571–1,119
All-time Winning Percentage	.508	.584

== Game results ==
Rutgers victories	Seton Hall victories	Tie games

No.	Date	Location	Winner	Score
1	1916	PIscataway	Rutgers	40–20
2	1924	Newark	Rutgers	43–30
3	1925	Piscataway	Rutgers	37–20
4	1929	Piscataway	Rutgers	28–25
5	1930	Newark	Rutgers	31–27
6	1931	Piscataway	Rutgers	37–26
7	1943	Newark	Seton Hall	36–18
8	1943	Piscataway	Seton Hall	45–31
9	1947	Piscataway	Seton Hall	69–52
10	1947	Newark	Seton Hall	46–43
11	1949	Piscataway	Seton Hall	63–61^{OT}
12	1950	Newark	Rutgers	61–59
13	1951	Piscataway	Seton Hall	62–44
14	1952	Newark	#12 Seton Hall	66–42
15	1974	New York	#20 Rutgers	89–81
16	1975	Piscataway	Rutgers	119–93
17	1977	New York	Seton Hall	89–75
18	1977	Piscataway	Rutgers	81–76
19	1977	Piscataway	Rutgers	93–78
20	1979	New York	Rutgers	88–67
21	1980	Piscataway	Rutgers	75–66
22	1981	New York	Seton Hall	65–56
23	1983	East Rutherford	Rutgers	93–78
24	1986	East Rutherford	Seton Hall	109–81
25	1987	East Rutherford	Seton Hall	92–72
26	1988	Newark	#17 Seton Hall	96–70
27	1989	Piscataway	Seton Hall	79–74
28	1990	East Rutherford	Seton Hall	90–76
29	1991	Piscataway	#12 Seton Hall	77–72
30	1996	Newark	Seton Hall	81–78
31	1996	Piscataway	Rutgers	70–61
32	1997	Piscataway	Seton Hall	75–72
33	1998	Piscataway	Rutgers	81–49
34	1998	Newark	Seton Hall	64–54
35	1999	Newark	Seton Hall	57–55
36	2000	Piscataway	Seton Hall	65–63^{OT}
37	2001	Newark	Rutgers	70–64
38	2001	Piscataway	Rutgers	75–57
39	2002	Newark	Seton Hall	67–54

No.	Date	Location	Winner	Score
40	2002	Piscataway	Rutgers	66–60
41	2003	Newark	Seton Hall	58–53
42	2003	Piscataway	Seton Hall	62–52
43	2004	Newark	Seton Hall	85–58
44	2004	Piscataway	Seton Hall	71–70
45	2005	Newark	Seton Hall	74–58
46	2005	Piscataway	Rutgers	62–61
47	2006	Piscataway	Rutgers	82–78
48	2006	Newark	Seton Hall	73–67
49	2006	New York	Rutgers	61–48
50	2007	Newark	Seton Hall	77–72
51	2007	Piscataway	Rutgers	74–70^{2OT}
52	2008	Piscataway	Seton Hall	84–71^{OT}
53	2008	Newark	Rutgers	64–61
54	2009	Newark	Seton Hall	70–67
55	2009	Piscataway	Seton Hall	65–60
56	2010	Newark	Seton Hall	76–70
57	2010	Piscataway	Seton Hall	85–74
58	2011	Newark	Rutgers	66–60
59	2011	Piscataway	Seton Hall	69–64
60	2011	Newark	Rutgers	76–70^{OT}
61	2012	Piscataway	Seton Hall	59–54
62	2012	Newark	Rutgers	77–72^{OT}
63	2013	Piscataway	Rutgers	57–55
64	2013	Newark	Rutgers	56–51
65	2013	Piscataway	Seton Hall	77–71
66	2014	Newark	Seton Hall	81–54
67	2015	Piscataway	Seton Hall	84–55
68	2016	Newark	Seton Hall	72–61
69	2017	Piscataway	Rutgers	71–65
70	2018	Newark	Seton Hall	72–66
71	2019	Piscataway	Rutgers	68–48
72	2021	Newark	#23 Seton Hall	77–63
73	2022	Piscataway	Seton Hall	45–43
74	2023	Newark	Rutgers	70–63
75	2024	Piscataway	Rutgers	66–63
76	2025	Newark	Seton Hall	81–59
77	2026	Piscataway		
Series: Seton Hall leads 43–33
