= Kevin Jones (basketball) =

American basketball player (born 1989)

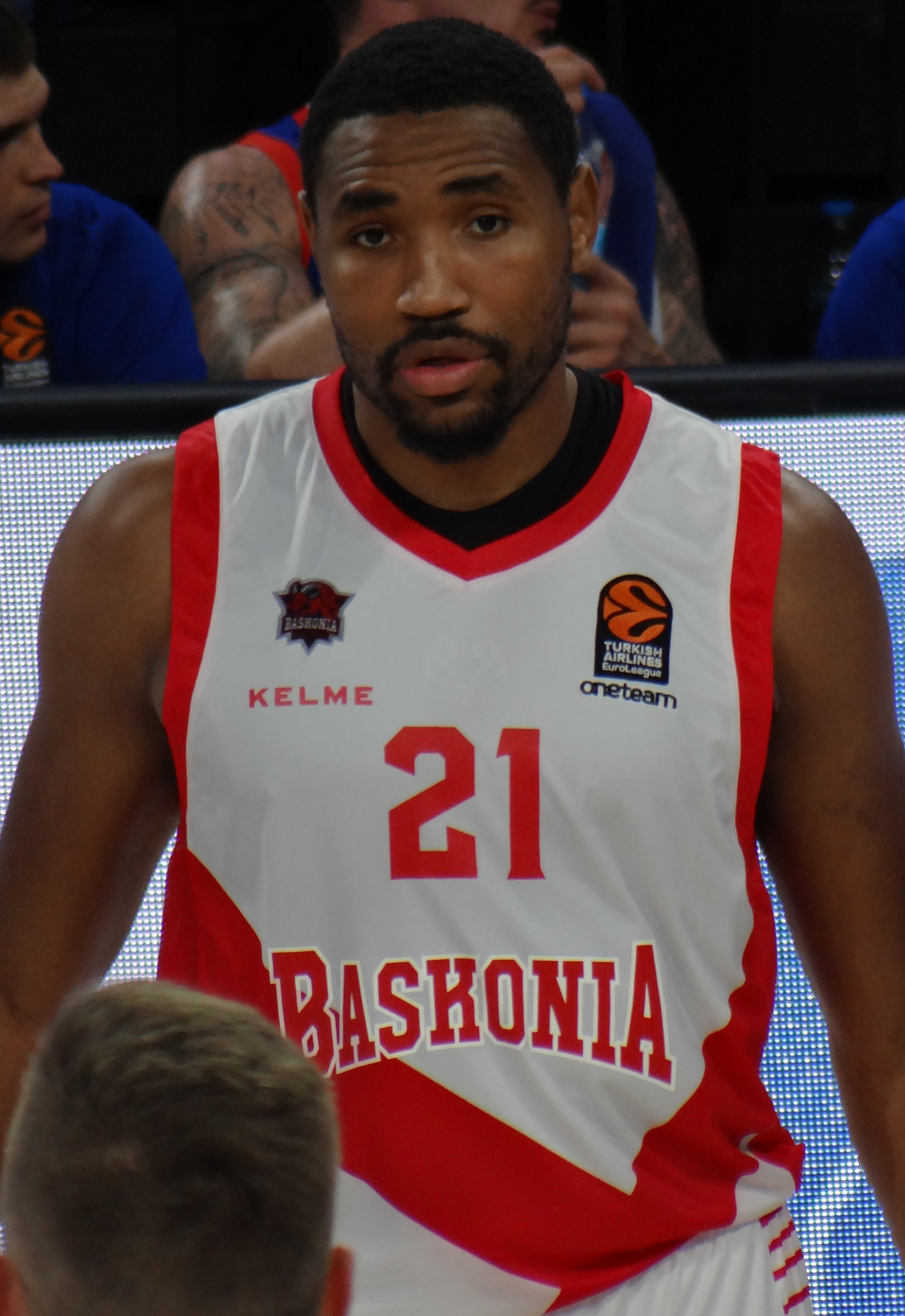
- Jones with Baskonia in 2017

No. 21 – Sun Rockers Shibuya
- Position: Power forward
- League: B.League

Personal information
- Born: August 25, 1989 (age 37) Mount Vernon, New York, U.S.
- Listed height: 6 ft 8 in (2.03 m)
- Listed weight: 243 lb (110 kg)

Career information
- High school: Mount Vernon (Mount Vernon, New York)
- College: West Virginia (2008–2012)
- NBA draft: 2012: undrafted
- Playing career: 2012–present

Career history
- 2012: Canton Charge
- 2012–2013: Cleveland Cavaliers
- 2012–2013: →Canton Charge
- 2013–2014: Canton Charge
- 2014: San Miguel Beermen
- 2015: Cholet
- 2015–2016: Partizan
- 2016–2017: Lokomotiv Kuban
- 2017–2018: Baskonia
- 2018: Nanterre 92
- 2018–2019: Ryukyu Golden Kings
- 2019–2021: Alvark Tokyo
- 2021–2023: Sun Rockers Shibuya
- 2023–2024: Kyoto Hannaryz
- 2024–present: Sun Rockers Shibuya

Career highlights
- All-VTB United League Second Team (2017); NBA D-League All-Star (2014); Consensus second-team All-American (2012); First-team All-Big East (2012); Fourth-team Parade All-American (2008)
- Stats at NBA.com
- Stats at Basketball Reference

Kevin Andrew Jones (born August 25, 1989) is an American professional basketball player for Sun Rockers Shibuya of the B.League in Japan. He played college basketball for West Virginia University, where he was an All-American.

== High school career ==
Jones attended Mount Vernon High School in Mount Vernon, New York. As a junior, he averaged 21 points, 12 rebounds, two blocks per game. As a senior, he averaged 23 points, 14 rebounds, and two blocks per game. In 2006 and 2007, he led Mount Vernon to the New York State PHSAA championships.

== College career ==
In his freshman season at West Virginia, Jones posted eight games in double figures, including a stretch of six games in a row during Big East play. In 35 games, he averaged 6.3 points and 4.9 rebounds in 19.3 minutes per game.

In his sophomore season, he set a school record with 135 offensive rebounds in a season and was second on the team in three-point field goals made with 42. He was also named to the Big East All-Tournament team and the 76 Classic All-Tournament team. In 38 games (all starts), he averaged 13.5 points, 7.2 rebounds and 1.1 assists in 33.0 minutes per game.

In his junior season, he earned All-Big East Honorable Mention honors. In 33 games (all starts), he averaged 13.1 points, 7.5 rebounds and 1.1 assists in 34.9 minutes per game.

In his senior season, he was named to the All-Big East first team and the NABC Division I All-District 5 first team. In 33 games (all starts), he averaged 19.9 points, 10.9 rebounds, 1.2 assists and 1.0 blocks in 38.3 minutes per game.

== Professional career ==
=== 2012–13 season ===
Jones went undrafted in the 2012 NBA draft. On September 10, 2012, Jones signed with the Cleveland Cavaliers. However, he was later waived by Cavaliers on October 27, 2012. On November 1, 2012, he was acquired by the Canton Charge as an affiliate player.

On November 29, 2012, after playing three games for the Charge averaging 27.0 points and 13.7 rebounds per game, Jones re-signed with the Cavaliers. On the same day, he was assigned back to the Charge. On December 4, 2012, he was recalled by the Cavaliers, but was sent back to the Charge for other assignments throughout the season. On December 7, 2012, he debuted for the Cavaliers in the NBA against the Minnesota Timberwolves and in eight and a half minutes had 2 points and 4 rebounds. On January 5, 2013, Jones played his best game up to then in the NBA against the Houston Rockets scoring 6 points and collecting 3 rebounds. After that match, coach of Cavaliers Byron Scott gave more chances to Jones. On April 14, 2013, Jones has played his best game in his first NBA season scoring a double-double, with 11 points and 10 rebounds against the Philadelphia 76ers.

=== 2013–14 season ===
On July 9, 2013, Jones joined the Cleveland Cavaliers for the 2013 NBA Summer League. On July 19, 2013, he was waived by the Cavaliers after not appearing in a summer league game.

In November 2013, Jones was re-acquired by the Canton Charge. On February 3, 2014, he was named to the Futures All-Star roster for the 2014 NBA D-League All-Star Game.

On March 8, 2014, Jones's contract was bought out by the Charge in order for him to sign with San Miguel Beermen of the Philippine Basketball Association.

=== 2014–15 season ===
In July 2014, Jones joined the Indiana Pacers for the 2014 NBA Summer League. On September 26, 2014, he signed with the New Orleans Pelicans. However, he was later waived by the Pelicans on October 24, 2014.

On February 18, 2015, Jones signed with Cholet Basket of France for the rest of the 2014–15 LNB Pro A season.

=== 2015–16 season ===
In July 2015, Jones joined the Milwaukee Bucks for the 2015 NBA Summer League.

On October 20, 2015, Jones signed a one-year contract with the Serbian team Partizan for the rest of the season.

=== 2016–17 season ===
On August 1, 2016, Jones signed with PBC Lokomotiv Kuban of Russia. He signed a one-plus-one year contract. On March 2, 2017, Jones's D-League rights would be traded to the Northern Arizona Suns in a three-way deal.

=== 2017–18 season ===
On November 27, 2017, Jones signed a two-month contract with Spanish club Baskonia with an option to extend it for the remainder of the season. Following the expiration of his contract, on January 29, 2018, he parted ways with Baskonia.

He continued his season with Nanterre 92 of the French Jeep Élite. Jones was named the Most Valuable Player of the month May.

=== Japan (2018–present) ===
In 2018, Jones signed with the Ryukyu Golden Kings of the B.League. He then signed with Alvark Tokyo for two seasons before joining the Sun Rockers Shibuya in 2021.

== Career statistics ==
Legend
GP	Games played	GS	Games started	MPG	Minutes per game
FG%	Field goal percentage	3P%	3-point field goal percentage	FT%	Free throw percentage
RPG	Rebounds per game	APG	Assists per game	SPG	Steals per game
BPG	Blocks per game	PPG	Points per game	**Bold**	Career high

=== College ===
Year	Team	GP	GS	MPG	FG%	3P%	FT%	RPG	APG	SPG	BPG	PPG
2008–09	West Virginia	35	0	19.3	.495	.214	.565	4.9	.6	.6	.7	6.3
2009–10	West Virginia	**38**	**38**	33.0	**.521**	**.404**	.661	7.2	1.1	.6	.9	13.5
2010–11	West Virginia	33	33	34.9	.446	.301	.604	7.5	1.1	.5	.5	13.1
2011–12	West Virginia	33	33	**38.3**	.509	.266	**.780**	**10.9**	**1.2**	**.7**	**1.0**	**19.9**
Career		139	104	35.3	.494	.315	.677	7.5	1.0	.6	.8	13.1

=== NBA ===
==== Regular season ====
Year	Team	GP	GS	MPG	FG%	3P%	FT%	RPG	APG	SPG	BPG	PPG
2012–13	Cleveland	32	0	10.4	.402	.000	.600	2.4	.3	.3	.2	3.0
Career		32	0	10.4	.402	.000	.600	2.4	.3	.3	.2	3.0

== Personal life ==
Jones is the son of Patricia Jones and Fred DeJarnett.
