= Vincent Council =

American professional basketball player

Free agent
- Position: Point guard

Personal information
- Born: October 15, 1990 (age 36) Brooklyn, New York, U.S.
- Listed height: 6 ft 2 in (1.88 m)
- Listed weight: 180 lb (82 kg)

Career information
- High school: The Patterson School (Lenoir, North Carolina)
- College: Providence (2009–2013)
- NBA draft: 2013: undrafted
- Playing career: 2013–present

Career history
- 2013–2014: Hapoel Tel Aviv
- 2014–2015: Rethymno
- 2015–2016: Koroivos Amaliadas
- 2017–2018: BC Nokia
- 2018: VEF Rīga
- 2019: Levickí Patrioti

Career highlights
- Third-team All-Big East (2012); Big East All-Rookie Team (2010)

Vincent Council (born October 15, 1990) is an American professional basketball player who last played for Levickí Patrioti. He is a 1.88 m (6 ft 2 in) tall Point guard.

== High school career ==
Council played high school basketball at The Patterson School, in Lenoir, North Carolina.

== College career ==
Council played college basketball with the Providence Friars, from 2009 to 2013.

== Professional career ==
Council began his pro career in with Hapoel Tel Aviv in 2013. In June 2014, he signed with Rethymno of the Greek Basket League. On September 22, 2015, Council joined Koroivos Amaliadas.

On June 9, 2017, Council joined BC Nokia of the Korisliiga.
