= 2011–12 Lehigh Mountain Hawks men's basketball team =

American college basketball season

2011–12 Lehigh Mountain Hawks men's basketball

Patriot League tournament champions

NCAA Tournament, Round of 32
- Conference: Patriot League
- Record: 27–8 (11–3 Patriot)
- Head coach: Brett Reed (5th season)
- Assistant coaches: Antoni Wyche; Ryan Krueger; Stephen Ott
- Home arena: Stabler Arena

2011–12 Patriot League men's basketball standings
	Conf.				Overall
Team	W		L	PCT	W		L	PCT
Bucknell	12	–	2	.857	25	–	10	.714
Lehigh†	11	–	3	.786	27	–	8	.771
American	10	–	4	.714	20	–	12	.625
Holy Cross	9	–	5	.643	15	–	14	.517
Lafayette	7	–	7	.500	13	–	18	.419
Army	5	–	9	.357	12	–	18	.400
Colgate	2	–	12	.143	8	–	22	.267
Navy	0	–	14	.000	3	–	26	.103
† 2012 Patriot League tournament winner

The 2011–12 Lehigh Mountain Hawks men's basketball team represented Lehigh University during the 2011–12 NCAA Division I men's basketball season. The Mountain Hawks, led by fifth-year head coach Brett Reed, played their home games at Stabler Arena and were members of the Patriot League. They finished the season 27–8, 11–3 in Patriot League play to finish in second place in the conference.

Following the regular season, Lehigh won the Patriot League Basketball tournament to earn the conference's automatic bid into the 2012 NCAA tournament. This was their fifth NCAA Tournament appearance with their last coming in 2010. As a 15 seed, they defeated 2 seed Duke in the second round, only the sixth time in NCAA Tournament history that a 15 seed defeated a 2 seed, though it was the second time of the 2012 tournament as 15 seed Norfolk State defeated 2 seed Missouri earlier the same day. This is the last time as of 2023 that a Patriot League team has won an NCAA tournament game. They fell to Xavier in the next round.

== Roster ==
Number	Name	Position	Height	Year	Hometown
1	Anthony D'Orazio	Guard	6–2	Sophomore	Camden, New Jersey
3	CJ McCollum	Guard	6–3	Junior	Canton, Ohio
4	John Adams	Forward	6–6	Senior	Cupertino, California
5	Cory Goodman	Guard	6–1	Junior	Philadelphia, Pennsylvania
11	Mackey McKnight	Guard	6–0	Sophomore	New Orleans, Louisiana
15	Corey Schaefer	Guard	6–1	Freshman	Johnston, Iowa
20	Holden Greiner	Forward	6–7	Junior	Traverse City, Michigan
21	Stefan Cvkalj	Guard	6–4	Freshman	Kitchener, Ontario
23	Tyrone Staggers	Forward	6–5	Freshman	Chicago, Illinois
31	Justin Maneri	Center/Forward	6–8	Senior	Saddle Brook, New Jersey
32	B.J. Bailey	Guard	6–3	Sophomore	Mays Landing, New Jersey
33	Kevin McCarthy	Center	6–10	Sophomore	St. Clair Shores, Michigan
40	Conroy Baltimore	Forward	6–6	Freshman	The Bronx, New York
42	Gabe Knutson	Forward	6–9	Junior	Urbandale, Iowa
44	Jordan Hamilton	Forward	6–6	Senior	Seattle, Washington

== Schedule ==
Date time, TV	Rank^{#}	Opponent^{#}	Result	Record	Site (attendance) city, state
Regular season
November 9, 2011*; 7:00 pm, ESPN2		at St. John's; 2K Sports Classic	L 73–78	0–1	Carnesecca Arena (4,409); Queens, NY
November 12, 2011*; 2:00 pm		at Iowa State	L 77–86	0–2	Hilton Coliseum (13,343); Ames, IA
November 15, 2011*; 7:00 pm		at Fairleigh Dickinson	W 72–61	1–2	Rothman Center (998); Hackensack, NJ
November 18, 2011*; 4:30 pm		vs. William & Mary; 2K Sports Classic	W 82–74	2–2	Vines Center (NA); Lynchburg, VA
November 19, 2011*; 7:00 pm		at Liberty; 2K Sports Classic	W 90–80	3–2	Vines Center (849); Lynchburg, VA
November 20, 2011*; 2:30 pm		vs. Eastern Kentucky; 2K Sports Classic	W 76–51	4–2	Vines Center (NA); Lynchburg, VA
November 28, 2011*; 7:00 pm		Quinnipiac	W 86–75	5–2	Stabler Arena (853); Bethlehem, PA
December 1, 2011*; 7:00 pm		at Fordham	W 78–60	6–2	Rose Hill Gymnasium (1,397); Bronx, NY
December 3, 2011*; 7:00 pm		at Cornell	L 79–81 ^{OT}	6–3	Newman Arena (1,849); Ithaca, NY
December 7, 2011*; 7:30 pm		Saint Francis (PA)	W 71–50	7–3	Stabler Arena (908); Bethlehem, PA
December 10, 2011*; 4:00 pm		at Wagner	W 70–69	8–3	Spiro Sports Center (2,326); Staten Island, NY
December 12, 2011*; 7:00 pm		Arcadia	W 95–55	9–3	Stabler Arena (425); Bethlehem, PA
December 22, 2011*; 9:00 pm, ESPNU		at No. 19 Michigan State	L 81–90	9–4	Breslin Student Events Center (14,797); East Lansing, MI
December 28, 2011*; 7:00 pm		at Saint Peter's	W 76–67	10–4	Yanitelli Center (349); Jersey City, NJ
December 31, 2011*; 1:00 pm		at Bryant	W 72–55	11–4	Chace Athletic Center (523); Smithfield, RI
January 3, 2012*; 7:00 pm		Maryland Eastern Shore	W 82–55	12–4	Stabler Arena (465); Bethlehem, PA
January 7, 2012; 3:30 pm		at Holy Cross	L 78–84	12–5 (0–1)	Chace Athletic Center (1,797); Worcester, MA
January 11, 2012; 7:00 pm		American	W 71–60	13–5 (1–1)	Stabler Arena (998); Bethlehem, PA
January 14, 2012; 2:00 pm		at Colgate	W 78–56	14–5 (2–1)	Cotterell Court (519); Hamilton, NY
January 18, 2012; 7:00 pm		Bucknell	L 61–68	14–6 (2–2)	Stabler Arena (1,795); Bethlehem, PA
January 22, 2012; 2:00 pm, CBSSN		at Lafayette	W 90–76	15–6 (3–2)	Kirby Sports Center (3,124); Easton, PA
January 26, 2012; 7:00 pm, CBSSN		Navy	W 71–60	16–6 (4–2)	Stabler Arena (1,184); Bethlehem, PA
January 29, 2012; 2:00 pm		Army	W 83–64	17–6 (5–2)	Stabler Arena (1,768); Bethlehem, PA
February 4, 2012; 2:00 pm		Holy Cross	W 75–51	18–6 (6–2)	Stabler Arena (1,485); Bethlehem, PA
February 9, 2012; 7:00 pm		at American	L 62–71	18–7 (6–3)	Bender Arena (1,304); Washington, D.C.
February 11, 2012; 7:00 pm		Colgate	W 89–69	19–7 (7–3)	Stabler Arena (2,217); Bethlehem, PA
February 16, 2012; 7:00 pm, CBSSN		at Bucknell	W 56–53	20–7 (8–3)	Sojka Pavilion (3,347); Lewisburg, PA
February 18, 2012; 4:00 pm, CBSSN		Lafayette	W 72–53	21–7 (9–3)	Stabler Arena (2,914); Bethlehem, PA
February 22, 2012; 7:00 pm		at Navy	W 58–41	22–7 (10–3)	Alumni Hall (2,801); Annapolis, MD
February 25, 2012; 4:00 pm		at Army	W 74–72 ^{OT}	23–7 (11–3)	Christl Arena (1,755); West Point, NY
Patriot League tournament
February 29, 2012; 7:00 pm	(2)	(7) Colgate; Quarterfinals	W 70–57	24–7	Stabler Arena (1,070); Bethlehem, PA
March 3, 2012; 2:00 pm, CBSSN	(2)	(3) American; Semifinals	W 85–66	25–7	Stabler Arena (1,238); Bethlehem, PA
March 7, 2012; 7:00 pm, CBSSN	(2)	at (1) Bucknell; Championship Game	W 82–77	26–7	Sojka Pavilion (4,267); Lewisburg, PA
NCAA tournament
March 16, 2012*; 7:15 pm, CBS	(15 S)	vs. (2 S) No. 8 Duke; Second Round	W 75–70	27–7	Greenboro Coliseum (16,523); Greensboro, NC
March 18, 2012*; 7:45 pm, truTV	(15 S)	vs. (10 S) Xavier; Third Round	L 58–70	27–8	Greenboro Coliseum (18,722); Greensboro, NC
*Non-conference game. ^{#}Rankings from AP Poll. (#) Tournament seedings in parentheses. All times are in Eastern Time (#) during NCAA Tournament is seed with Region.
