= 2011–12 American Eagles men's basketball team =

American college basketball season

2011–12 American Eagles men's basketball

CIT, First Round
- Conference: Patriot League
- Record: 20–12 (10–4 Patriot)
- Head coach: Jeff Jones (12th season)
- Assistant coaches: Kieran Donohue; Lamar Barrett; Eddie Jackson
- Home arena: Bender Arena

2011–12 Patriot League men's basketball standings
	Conf.				Overall
Team	W		L	PCT	W		L	PCT
Bucknell	12	–	2	.857	25	–	10	.714
Lehigh†	11	–	3	.786	27	–	8	.771
American	10	–	4	.714	20	–	12	.625
Holy Cross	9	–	5	.643	15	–	14	.517
Lafayette	7	–	7	.500	13	–	18	.419
Army	5	–	9	.357	12	–	18	.400
Colgate	2	–	12	.143	8	–	22	.267
Navy	0	–	14	.000	3	–	26	.103
† 2012 Patriot League tournament winner

The 2011–12 American Eagles men's basketball team represented American University during the 2011–12 NCAA Division I men's basketball season. The Eagles, led by 12th year head coach Jeff Jones, played their home games at Bender Arena and are members of the Patriot League. They finished the season 20–12, 10–4 in Patriot League play to finish in third place. They lost in the semifinals of the Patriot League Basketball tournament to Lehigh. They were invited to the 2012 CollegeInsider.com Tournament where they lost in the first round to Buffalo.

== Roster ==
Number	Name	Position	Height	Weight	Year	Hometown
0	Simon McCormack	Guard	6–4	185	Senior	New Castle, New Hampshire
1	Kyle Kager	Forward	6–8	195	Freshman	Flower Mound, Texas
2	Daniel Munoz	Guard	6–1	175	Junior	Plantation, Florida
3	Troy Brewer	Guard	6–5	180	Senior	Gaithersburg, Maryland
4	Wayne Simon III	Guard	5–10	155	Sophomore	Westchester, Illinois
10	Warren Flood, Jr.	Guard	6–2	200	Junior	Olney, Maryland
12	Daniel Fisher	Forward	6–7	230	Junior	Melbourne, Australia
13	Riley Grafft	Forward	6–11	220	Senior	Janesville, Wisconsin
20	Blake Jolivette	Guard	5–11	220	Junior	Houston, Texas
22	John Schoof	Guard	6–5	205	Freshman	Fairfax, Virginia
23	Charles Hinkle	Forward	6–5	205	Senior	Los Alamitos, California
25	Joe Hill	Guard	6–2	200	Senior	Plymouth Meeting, Pennsylvania
33	Jordan Borucki	Guard	6–3	195	Junior	Los Angeles, California
34	Tony Wroblicky	Center	6–10	230	Sophomore	Los Angeles, California
43	Mike Bersch	Forward	6–6	205	Junior	Mt. Holly, New Jersey

== Schedule ==
Date time, TV	Rank^{#}	Opponent^{#}	Result	Record	Site (attendance) city, state
Exhibition
November 2, 2011*; 7:30 pm		Randolph–Macon	W 62–61	—	Bender Arena (527); Washington, D.C.
Regular season
November 11, 2011*; 7:30 pm		at Richmond	L 56–66	0–1	Robins Center (6,571); Richmond, VA
November 14, 2011*; 7:00 pm		at Maryland Eastern Shore	L 62–64 ^{OT}	0–2	Hytche Athletic Center (3,021); Princess Anne, MD
November 16, 2011*; 7:30 pm, CSNMA		Florida Atlantic	W 62–56	1–2	Bender Arena (1,280); Washington, D.C.
November 19, 2011*; 7:00 pm		at Columbia	W 66–58	2–2	Levien Gymnasium (1,232); New York City, NY
November 22, 2011*; 7:30 pm		Quinnipiac	W 74–73	3–2	Bender Arena (717); Washington, D.C.
November 27, 2011*; 3:00 pm		at Cornell	W 65–63	4–2	Newman Arena (1,113); Ithaca, NY
November 29, 2011*; 7:30 pm, CSNMA		Howard	W 77–66	5–2	Bender Arena (1,027); Washington, D.C.
December 1, 2011*; 7:30 pm, CSNMA		UMBC	W 69–58	6–2	Bender Arena (721); Washington, D.C.
December 4, 2011*; 8:00 pm, CSNMA		Saint Joseph's	L 79–81	7–2	Bender Arena (1,113); Washington, D.C.
December 7, 2011*; 7:30 pm		Hampton	W 74–72	8–2	Bender Arena (723); Washington, D.C.
December 10, 2011*; 7:00 pm		at Saint Francis (PA)	L 61–66	8–3	DeGol Arena (762); Loretto, PA
December 17, 2011*; 12:00 pm, MASN		at No. 16 Georgetown	L 55–81	8–4	Verizon Center (9,964); Washington, D.C.
December 22, 2011*; 7:00 pm		at Villanova	L 52–73	8–5	The Pavilion (6,500); Villanova, PA
December 29, 2011*; 4:00 pm		at Mount St. Mary's	L 42–49	8–6	Knott Arena (860); Emmitsburg, MD
January 2, 2012*; 1:00 pm		at Brown	W 70–61	9–6	Pizzitola Sports Center (773); Providence, RI
January 7, 2012; 2:00 pm		Colgate	W 82–54	10–6 (1–0)	Bender Arena (1,086); Washington, D.C.
January 11, 2012; 7:00 pm		at Lehigh	L 60–71	10–7 (1–1)	Stabler Arena (998); Bethlehem, PA
January 14, 2012; 2:00 pm		Holy Cross	W 67–54	11–7 (2–1)	Bender Arena (2,351); Washington, D.C.
January 18, 2012; 7:00 pm		at Navy	W 67–60	12–7 (3–1)	Alumni Hall (1,666); Annapolis, MD
January 21, 2012; 2:00 pm, CSNMA		Army	W 67–55	13–7 (4–1)	Bender Arena (2,184); Washington, D.C.
January 25, 2012; 7:00 pm		at Bucknell	L 61–67	13–8 (4–2)	Sojka Pavilion (2,867); Lewisburg, PA
January 28, 2012; 1:00 pm		at Lafayette	W 69–61	14–8 (5–2)	Kirby Sports Center (2,315); Easton, PA
February 4, 2012; 2:00 pm		at Colgate	W 59–58	15–8 (6–2)	Cotterell Court (761); Hamilton, NY
February 9, 2012; 7:00 pm, CBSSN		Lehigh	W 59–58	16–8 (7–2)	Bender Arena (1,304); Washington, D.C.
February 11, 2012; 2:00 pm		at Holy Cross	L 52–59	16–9 (7–3)	Chace Athletic Center (2,578); Worcester, MA
February 15, 2012; 7:30 pm, CSNMA		Navy	W 69–47	17–9 (8–3)	Bender Arena (1,219); Washington, D.C.
February 18, 2012; 4:00 pm		at Army	W 74–50	18–9 (9–3)	Christl Arena (1,219); West Point, NY
February 23, 2012; 7:00 pm, CBSSN		Bucknell	L 50–55	18–10 (9–4)	Bender Arena (1,653); Washington, D.C.
February 25, 2012; 4:00 pm, CBSSN		Lafayette	W 76–69	19–10 (10–4)	Bender Arena (2,369); Washington, D.C.
Patriot League tournament
February 29, 2012; 7:30 pm	(3)	(6) Army; Quarterfinals	W 57–40	20–10	Bender Arena (1,002); Washington, D.C.
March 3, 2012; 2:00 pm, CBSSN	(3)	at (2) Lehigh; Semifinals	L 66–85	20–11	Stabler Arena (1,238); Bethlehem, PA
CollegeInsider.com tournament
March 14, 2012*; 7:30 pm		Buffalo; First Round	L 61–78	20–12	Bender Arena (256); Washington, D.C.
*Non-conference game. ^{#}Rankings from AP Poll. (#) Tournament seedings in parentheses. All times are in Eastern Time.
