= 2011–12 Bucknell Bison men's basketball team =

American college basketball season

2011–12 Bucknell Bison men's basketball

Patriot League regular season champions

NIT, Second Round
- Conference: Patriot League
- Record: 25–10 (12–2 Patriot)
- Head coach: Dave Paulsen (4th season)
- Assistant coaches: Dane Fischer; Michael Cotton; Aaron Kelly
- Home arena: Sojka Pavilion

2011–12 Patriot League men's basketball standings
	Conf.				Overall
Team	W		L	PCT	W		L	PCT
Bucknell	12	–	2	.857	25	–	10	.714
Lehigh†	11	–	3	.786	27	–	8	.771
American	10	–	4	.714	20	–	12	.625
Holy Cross	9	–	5	.643	15	–	14	.517
Lafayette	7	–	7	.500	13	–	18	.419
Army	5	–	9	.357	12	–	18	.400
Colgate	2	–	12	.143	8	–	22	.267
Navy	0	–	14	.000	3	–	26	.103
† 2012 Patriot League tournament winner

The 2011–12 Bucknell Bison men's basketball team represented Bucknell University during the 2011–12 NCAA Division I men's basketball season. The Bison, led by fourth-year head coach Dave Paulsen, played their home games at Sojka Pavilion and were members of the Patriot League. They finished the season 25–10, 12–2 in Patriot League play to be crowned regular season champions. They lost in the championship game of the Patriot League Basketball tournament to Lehigh. As regular season champions, they received an automatic bid into the 2012 National Invitation Tournament, where they defeated Arizona in the first round before falling in the second round to Nevada.

== Roster ==
Number	Name	Position	Height	Weight	Year	Hometown
1	Probese Leo	Forward/center	6–9	230	Senior	Nassau, Bahamas
3	Steven Kasper	Guard	6–2	181	Freshman	Lakeland, Tennessee
4	Bryan Cohen	Guard	6–6	213	Senior	Huntingdon Valley, Pennsylvania
5	Colin Kiebon	Forward	6–8	233	Junior	Shamokin, Pennsylvania
10	Brian Fitzpatrick	Forward	6–8	238	Junior	Cheshire, Connecticut
11	Joshea Singleton	Guard	6–3	212	Freshman	Kinston, North Carolina
12	Bryson Johnson	Guard	6–2	194	Junior	Pictou, Nova Scotia
15	Joe Willman	Forward	6–7	217	Junior	Tinton Falls, New Jersey
21	Enoch Andoh	Forward/center	6–8	252	Senior	San Jose, California
22	Cory Starkey	Forward	6–7	208	Freshman	Petoskey, Michigan
24	Ryan Hill	Guard	6–3	202	Sophomore	Steelton, Pennsylvania
31	Mike Muscala	Forward/center	6–11	234	Junior	Roseville, Minnesota
33	Ben Brackney	Guard	6–6	208	Sophomore	Lincoln, Illinois
42	Cameron Ayers	Guard	6–5	203	Sophomore	Blue Bell, Pennsylvania

== Schedule ==
Date time, TV	Rank^{#}	Opponent^{#}	Result	Record	Site (attendance) city, state
Regular season
11/11/2011*; 8:00 pm		at Minnesota	L 58–70	0–1	Williams Arena (11,976); Minneapolis, MN
11/15/2011*; 8:00 pm		at Vanderbilt; Legends Classic	L 68–80	0–2	Memorial Gymnasium (12,543); Nashville, TN
11/19/2011*; 7:00 pm		Saint Francis (PA)	W 73–42	1–2	Sojka Pavilion (3,242); Lewisburg, PA
11/22/2011*; 7:00 pm		at Marist	W 74–68	2–2	McCann Field House (1,168); Poughkeepsie, NY
11/25/2011*; 6:00 pm		Princeton; Legends Classic	W 62–56	3–2	Sojka Pavilion (2,488); Lewisburg, PA
11/26/2011*; 4:30 pm		West Alabama; Legends Classic	W 87–50	4–2	Sojka Pavilion (2,185); Lewisburg, PA
11/27/2011*; 4:30 pm		Morehead State; Legends Classic	W 54–50	5–2	Sojka Pavilion (2,256); Lewisburg, PA
11/30/2011*; 7:00 pm, MASN		at George Mason	L 57–61	5–3	Patriot Center (5,057); Fairfax, VA
12/03/2011*; 4:00 pm		at La Salle	L 52–78	5–4	Tom Gola Arena (1,823); Philadelphia, PA
12/06/2011*; 7:00 pm		at Binghamton	W 77–63	6–4	Binghamton University Events Center (2,078); Vestal, NY
12/17/2011*; 7:00 pm		Richmond	W 79–65	7–4	Sojka Pavilion (3,140); Lewisburg, PA
12/20/2011*; 7:00 pm, ESPNU		at No. 1 Syracuse	L 61–80	7–5	Carrier Dome (17,302); Syracuse, NY
12/22/2011*; 7:00 pm		at Boston University	W 75–61	8–5	Case Gym (703); Boston, MA
12/28/2011*; 7:00 pm		Loyola (MD)	L 67–72	8–6	Sojka Pavilion (3,348); Lewisburg, PA
12/31/2011*; 2:00 pm		Cornell	W 63–60	9–6	Sojka Pavilion (2,649); Lewisburg, PA
01/03/2012*; 7:00 pm		at Dartmouth	W 67–59	10–6	Leede Arena (744); Hanover, NH
01/07/2012; 7:00 pm		at Army	W 75–59	11–6 (1–0)	Christl Arena (1,357); West Point, NY
01/11/2012; 7:00 pm		Colgate	W 70–57	12–6 (2–0)	Sojka Pavilion (2,416); Lewisburg, PA
01/14/2012; 1:00 pm		at Lafayette	W 79–65	13–6 (3–0)	Kirby Sports Center (2,515); Easton, PA
01/18/2012; 7:00 pm		at Lehigh	W 68–61	14–6 (4–0)	Stabler Arena (1,795); Bethlehem, PA
01/21/2012; 7:00 pm		Holy Cross	W 75–41	15–6 (5–0)	Sojka Pavilion (3,983); Lewisburg, PA
01/25/2012; 7:00 pm		American	W 67–61	16–6 (6–0)	Sojka Pavilion (2,867); Lewisburg, PA
01/28/2012; 7:00 pm		at Navy	W 66–51	17–6 (7–0)	Alumni Hall (3,718); Annapolis, MD
02/04/2012; 7:00 pm		Army	W 81–68	18–6 (8–0)	Sojka Pavilion (3,769); Lewisburg, PA
02/08/2012; 7:00 pm		at Colgate	W 66–50	19–6 (9–0)	Cotterell Court (584); Hamilton, NY
02/11/2012; 7:00 pm		Lafayette	W 90–78	20–6 (10–0)	Sojka Pavilion (3,482); Lewisburg, PA
02/16/2012; 7:00 pm, CBSSN		Lehigh	L 53–56	20–7 (10–1)	Sojka Pavilion (3,347); Lewisburg, PA
02/18/2012; 4:00 pm		at Holy Cross	L 52–54	20–8 (10–2)	Hart Center (3,372); Worcester, MA
02/23/2012; 7:00 pm, CBSSN		at American	W 55–50	21–8 (11–2)	Bender Arena (1,653); Washington, D.C.
02/25/2012; 4:00 pm		Navy	W 64–55	22–8 (12–2)	Sojka Pavilion (3,894); Lewisburg, PA
2012 Patriot League men's basketball tournament
02/29/2012; 7:00 pm	(1)	(8) Navy; Quarterfinals	W 87–63	23–8	Sojka Pavilion (2,709); Lewisburg, PA
03/03/2012; 4:30 pm, CBSSN	(1)	(5) Lafayette; Semifinals	W 79–52	24–8	Sojka Pavilion (3,823); Lewisburg, PA
03/07/2012; 7:00 pm, CBSSN	(1)	(2) Lehigh; Championship Game	L 77–82	24–9	Sojka Pavilion (4,267); Lewisburg, PA
2012 NIT
03/14/2012*; 9:00 pm, ESPN2		at Arizona; First Round	W 65–54	25–9	McKale Center (8,433); Tucson, AZ
03/18/2012*; 3:00 pm, ESPNU		at Nevada; Second Round	L 67–75	25–10	Lawlor Events Center (6,927); Reno, NV
*Non-conference game. ^{#}Rankings from AP Poll. (#) Tournament seedings in parentheses. All times are in Eastern Time.
