= 2012 Patriot League men's basketball tournament =

- Classification: Division I
- Season: 2011–12
- Teams: 8
- Site: Campus sites
- Champions: Lehigh (3rd title)
- Winning coach: Brett Reed (2nd title)
- MVP: CJ McCollum (Lehigh)
- Television: CBS Sports Network

2011–12 Patriot League men's basketball standings
	Conf.				Overall
Team	W		L	PCT	W		L	PCT
Bucknell	12	–	2	.857	25	–	10	.714
Lehigh†	11	–	3	.786	27	–	8	.771
American	10	–	4	.714	20	–	12	.625
Holy Cross	9	–	5	.643	15	–	14	.517
Lafayette	7	–	7	.500	13	–	18	.419
Army	5	–	9	.357	12	–	18	.400
Colgate	2	–	12	.143	8	–	22	.267
Navy	0	–	14	.000	3	–	26	.103
† 2012 Patriot League tournament winner

The 2012 Patriot League men's basketball tournament was held at campus sites for the higher seeds. The quarterfinals were on February 29, the semi-finals on March 3, and the championship was held on March 7. The winner of the tournament, the Lehigh Mountain Hawks received an automatic bid to the NCAA tournament.

== Bracket ==
Quarterfinals; February 29
1	Bucknell	87
8	Navy	63
4	Holy Cross	76
5	Lafayette	84
2	Lehigh	70
7	Colgate	57
3	American	57
6	Army	40

Semifinals; March 3
1	Bucknell	79
5	Lafayette	52
2	Lehigh	85
3	American	66

Championship game March 7
1	Bucknell	77
2	Lehigh	82
