= 2011–12 Navy Midshipmen men's basketball team =

American college basketball season

2011–12 Navy Midshipmen men's basketball
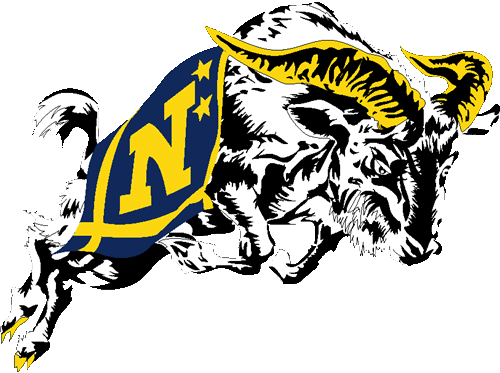
- Conference: Patriot League
- Record: 3–26 (0–14 Patriot)
- Head coach: Ed DeChellis (1st season)
- Assistant coaches: Jason Crafton; Dan Earl; Kurt Kanaskie; D.J. Black; Aaron Goodman
- Home arena: Alumni Hall

2011–12 Patriot League men's basketball standings
	Conf.				Overall
Team	W		L	PCT	W		L	PCT
Bucknell	12	–	2	.857	25	–	10	.714
Lehigh†	11	–	3	.786	27	–	8	.771
American	10	–	4	.714	20	–	12	.625
Holy Cross	9	–	5	.643	15	–	14	.517
Lafayette	7	–	7	.500	13	–	18	.419
Army	5	–	9	.357	12	–	18	.400
Colgate	2	–	12	.143	8	–	22	.267
Navy	0	–	14	.000	3	–	26	.103
† 2012 Patriot League tournament winner

The 2011–12 Navy Midshipmen men's basketball team represented the United States Naval Academy during the 2011–12 NCAA Division I men's basketball season. The Midshipmen, led by first year head coach Ed DeChellis, played their home games at Alumni Hall and were members of the Patriot League.

== Roster ==
2011–12 Navy Midshipmen men's basketball team
Players
Coaches

Pos.	#	Name	Height	Weight	Year	Hometown
G	0	Wes Clark	6 ft 0 in (1.83 m)	165 lb (75 kg)	Fr	Stafford, Virginia
G	1	Ted Connolly	6 ft 2 in (1.88 m)	201 lb (91 kg)	Sr	Wexford, Pennsylvania
G	2	Brennan Wyatt	5 ft 8 in (1.73 m)	161 lb (73 kg)	So	Greensboro, North Carolina
F	3	James Loupos	6 ft 6 in (1.98 m)	192 lb (87 kg)	So	Skillman, New Jersey
G	5	Kevin Alter	5 ft 7 in (1.7 m)	145 lb (66 kg)	Fr	Rumson, New Jersey
G	10	Jon Ward–Adams	5 ft 11 in (1.8 m)	169 lb (77 kg)	Fr	Center Moriches, New York
G	11	Thurgood Wynn	6 ft 3 in (1.91 m)	186 lb (84 kg)	So	Bethesda, Maryland
G	12	Jordan Brickman	5 ft 11 in (1.8 m)	193 lb (88 kg)	Jr	San Antonio, Texas
G	14	Earl McLaurin	5 ft 10 in (1.78 m)	167 lb (76 kg)	Fr	Charlotte, North Carolina
G	15	Chall Montgomery	6 ft 2 in (1.88 m)	190 lb (86 kg)	Fr	Cleveland, Ohio
F	20	Carlton Smith	6 ft 6 in (1.98 m)	219 lb (99 kg)	Sr	Rochester, New York
F	21	Worth Smith	6 ft 5 in (1.96 m)	196 lb (89 kg)	Fr	Mooresville, North Carolina
G	22	Isaiah Roberts	6 ft 1 in (1.85 m)	175 lb (79 kg)	So	Pennsauken, New Jersey
G	23	Donya Jackson	6 ft 3 in (1.91 m)	212 lb (96 kg)	Fr	Baltimore, Maryland
G	25	Jordan Sugars	6 ft 3 in (1.91 m)	219 lb (99 kg)	Sr	Winchester, Virginia
F	31	J. J. Avila	6 ft 7 in (2.01 m)	246 lb (112 kg)	So	McAllen, Texas
G	32	Jacob Liebert	6 ft 3 in (1.91 m)	201 lb (91 kg)	So	Alamo, California
G	33	Brandon Venturini	6 ft 0 in (1.83 m)	177 lb (80 kg)	Fr	Allendale, Michigan
F	34	Tre McNeil	6 ft 5 in (1.96 m)	188 lb (85 kg)	Fr	San Antonio, Texas
C	42	Jared Smoot	6 ft 10 in (2.08 m)	244 lb (111 kg)	Fr	Crown Point, Indiana

Head coach

- Ed DeChellis (Penn State)

Assistant coach(es)

- Jason Crafton (Nyack)
- Dan Earl (Penn State)
- Kurt Kanaskie (La Salle)
- D.J. Black (Penn State)
- Aaron Goodman (Boston University)

Legend

- (C) Team captain
- (S) Suspended
- (I) Ineligible
- (W) Walk-on
- Injured
- Current redshirt

Roster
Last update: January 6, 2023

== Schedule ==
Date time, TV	Rank^{#}	Opponent^{#}	Result	Record	Site (attendance) city, state
Regular season
November 11, 2011*; 7:00 pm		at Longwood	W 78–70	1–0	Willett Hall (1,779); Farmville, VA
November 13, 2011*; 4:00 pm		Penn State Altoona	W 88–54	2–0	Alumni Hall (1,629); Annapolis, MD
November 16, 2011*; 4:00 pm		at Siena	L 56–65	2–1	Times Union Center (5,896); Albany, NY
November 19, 2011*; 2:00 pm		at Quinnipiac	L 54–78	2–2	TD Bank Sports Center (1,690); Hamden, CT
November 22, 2011*; 7:00 pm		Tulane	L 55–57	2–3	Alumni Hall (1,726); Annapolis, MD
November 25, 2011*; 4:00 pm		at Albany	L 62–69	2–4	SEFCU Arena (3,037); Albany, NY
November 27, 2011*; 7:00 pm		Mount St. Mary's	W 64–56	3–4	Alumni Hall (1,276); Annapolis, MD
November 30, 2011*; 7:00 pm		at Maryland Eastern Shore	L 46–59	3–5	Hytche Athletic Center (1,092); Princess Anne, MD
December 3, 2011*; 2:00 pm		at Elon	L 48–51	3–6	Alumni Gym (1,037); Elon, NC
December 6, 2011*; 7:00 pm		Monmouth	L 67–69	3–7	Alumni Hall (1,682); Annapolis, MD
December 10, 2011*; 7:00 pm		at No. 10 Missouri	L 59–84	3–8	Mizzou Arena (11,529); Columbia, MS
December 22, 2011*; 7:00 pm		at Presbyterian	L 42–58	3–9	Templeton Physical Education Center (856); Clinton, SC
December 30, 2011*; 7:00 pm		Mercer	L 56–65	3–10	Alumni Hall (2,555); Annapolis, MD
January 1, 2012*; 4:00 pm		Norfolk State	L 65–71	3–11	Alumni Hall (1,312); Annapolis, MD
January 7, 2012; 7:00 pm		Lafayette	L 63–65	3–12 (0–1)	Alumni Hall (1,986); Annapolis, MD
January 11, 2012; 7:00 pm		at Holy Cross	L 69–73	3–13 (0–2)	Hart Center (1,374); Worcester, MA
January 14, 2012; 2:30 pm, CBSSN		Army	L 62–75	3–14 (0–3)	Alumni Hall (5,710); Annapolis, MD
January 18, 2012; 7:00 pm		American	L 60–67	3–15 (0–4)	Alumni Hall (1,666); Annapolis, MD
January 21, 2012; 2:00 pm		at Colgate	L 54–65 ^{OT}	3–16 (0–5)	Cotterell Court (813); Hamilton, NY
January 26, 2012; 7:00 pm, CBSSN		at Lehigh	L 54–65	3–17 (0–6)	Stabler Arena (1,184); Bethlehem, PA
January 28, 2012; 7:00 pm		Bucknell	L 51–66	3–18 (0–7)	Alumni Hall (3,718); Annapolis, MD
February 4, 2012; 1:00 pm		at Lafayette	L 41–62	3–19 (0–8)	Kirby Sports Center (2,253); Easton, PA
February 8, 2012; 7:00 pm		Holy Cross	L 52–64	3–20 (0–9)	Alumni Hall (1,702); Annapolis, MD
February 11, 2012; 2:30 pm, CBSSN		at Army	L 63–69 ^{2OT}	3–21 (0–10)	Christl Arena (5,189); West Point, NY
February 15, 2012; 7:30 pm		at American	L 47–69	3–22 (0–11)	Washington, D.C. (1,219); Bender Arena
February 18, 2012; 7:00 pm		at Colgate	L 57–59	3–23 (0–12)	Alumni Hall (4,122); Annapolis, MD
February 22, 2012; 7:00 pm		Lehigh	L 41–58	3–24 (0–13)	Alumni Hall (2,801); Annapolis, MD
February 25, 2012; 4:00 pm		at Bucknell	L 55–64	3–25 (0–14)	Sojka Pavilion (3,894); Lewisburg, PA
Patriot League tournament
February 29, 2012; 7:00 pm	(8)	at (1) Bucknell; Quarterfinals	L 63–87	3–26	Sojka Pavilion (2,709); Lewisburg, PA
*Non-conference game. ^{#}Rankings from AP Poll. (#) Tournament seedings in parentheses. All times are in Eastern Time.
