= Holden Greiner =

American basketball player (born 1991)

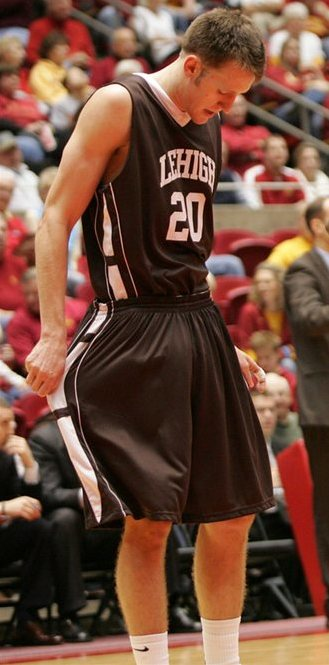
- Greiner playing for Lehigh

Personal information
- Born: March 25, 1991 (age 35) Traverse City, Michigan
- Listed height: 6 ft 8 in (2.03 m)
- Listed weight: 209 lb (95 kg)

Career information
- High school: St. Francis (Traverse City, Michigan)
- College: Lehigh (2009–2013)
- NBA draft: 2013: undrafted
- Playing career: 2013–2015
- Position: Forward

Career history
- 2013–2014: Landstede Zwolle
- 2014–2015: AEK Larnaca
- 2015: Residence

Career highlights
- DBL All-Star (2014)

Holden Greiner (born March 25, 1991) is a former professional basketball player. Greiner usually played as a forward. He played four seasons for the Lehigh Mountain Hawks men's basketball team.

== College career ==
As a junior at Lehigh, Greiner posted 9.4 points per game as Lehigh reached the NCAA Tournament. Greiner averaged 13.2 points and 6.7 rebounds per game as a senior. He took over much of the scoring after CJ McCollum was sidelined by a foot injury. Greiner helped lead Lehigh to a berth in the College Basketball Invitational tournament.

== Professional career ==
On 17 July 2013 he signed with the Dutch team Landstede Basketbal from Zwolle.

For the 2014–15 season, Greiner signed with AEK Larnaca in Cyprus.

Greiner signed a training camp deal with the London Lightning of the National Basketball League of Canada (NBL) for the 2015–16 season. He joined the team in an exhibition game against Raptors 905 of the NBA Development League on November 9, 2015. Greiner appeared on the starting lineup, but the Lightning lost 111–126.

== Honours ==
Landstede Zwolle

- DBL All-Star (1): 2014
