= Portland Trail Blazers draft history =

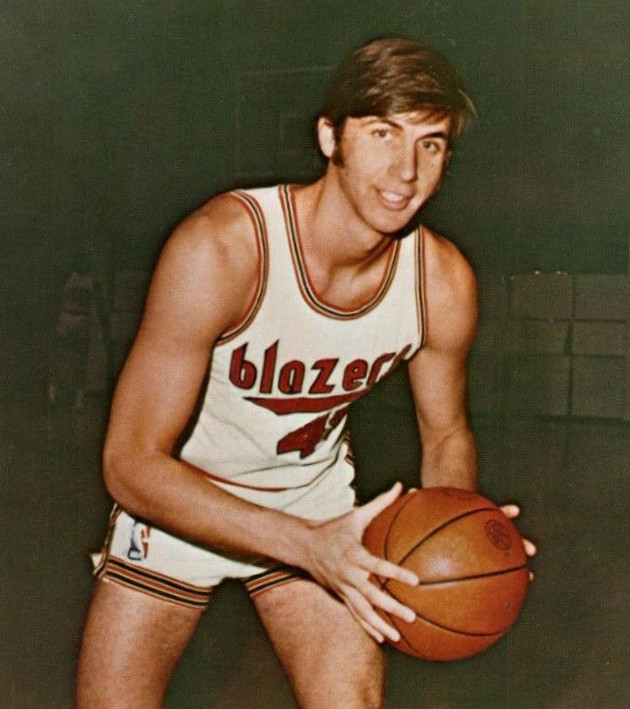
Geoff Petrie was the first draft pick in franchise history, selected 8th overall in 1970.

The Portland Trail Blazers are an American professional basketball team based in Portland, Oregon. They play in the Northwest Division of the Western Conference of the National Basketball Association (NBA). The franchise was founded in the 1970–71 NBA season. The team made their first draft pick in the 1970 NBA draft and have selected 283 players total. The franchise won its only NBA championship in 1977, when the team was led by their 1974 first overall pick, Bill Walton, as well as multiple other former draft picks who went on to have their numbers retired by Portland. Many of the players selected have gone on to have accomplished careers while playing for the team. Clyde Drexler and Damian Lillard hold multiple Blazer records and are first in many stats. Along with Walton and Drexler, two other draft picks, Dražen Petrović and Arvydas Sabonis, went on to be inducted into the Naismith Memorial Basketball Hall of Fame after their playing careers ended, with Petrović being inducted posthumously.

Portland has held the first overall pick four times, selecting Walton in 1974, LaRue Martin in 1972, Mychal Thompson in 1978, and Greg Oden in 2007. Three players drafted by Portland won the Rookie of the Year award. Geoff Petrie, the franchise's first ever draft pick, was named co-Rookie of the Year with Dave Cowens of the Boston Celtics in 1971. Sidney Wicks won the award the next season after being selected second overall in the 1971 NBA draft, and Lillard won in 2013 after being drafted sixth overall in the 2012 NBA draft.

== History ==
The Trail Blazers first participated in the 1970 NBA draft on March 23, before their inaugural NBA season. Before each draft, an NBA draft lottery determines the first round selection order for the teams that missed the playoffs during the prior season. Teams can also trade their picks, which means that teams may have more or less than two picks in some drafts, although they must have at least one first-round pick every other year. Until 1968, there were a total of 21 rounds in the draft. The number of rounds shrank gradually over the following years, until 1989 when the current format began. The first pick in the Trail Blazers' history was Geoff Petrie, a guard from Princeton University who was selected 8th overall in 1970. Petrie played for the Blazers for his entire career, playing from 1970–1976. He was a 2x NBA All-Star and was named co-rookie of the year with Dave Cowens of the Boston Celtics in 1971. Petrie averaged 21.8 points, 2.8 rebounds, and 4.6 assists in 446 games.

=== First overall picks ===
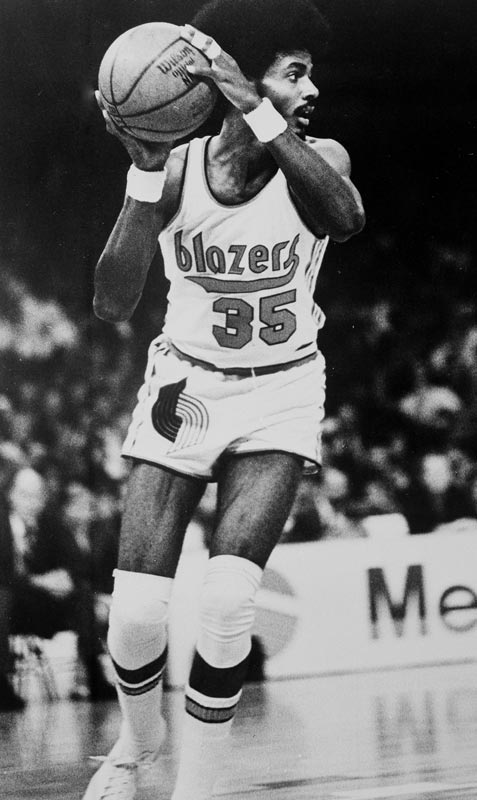
LaRue Martin

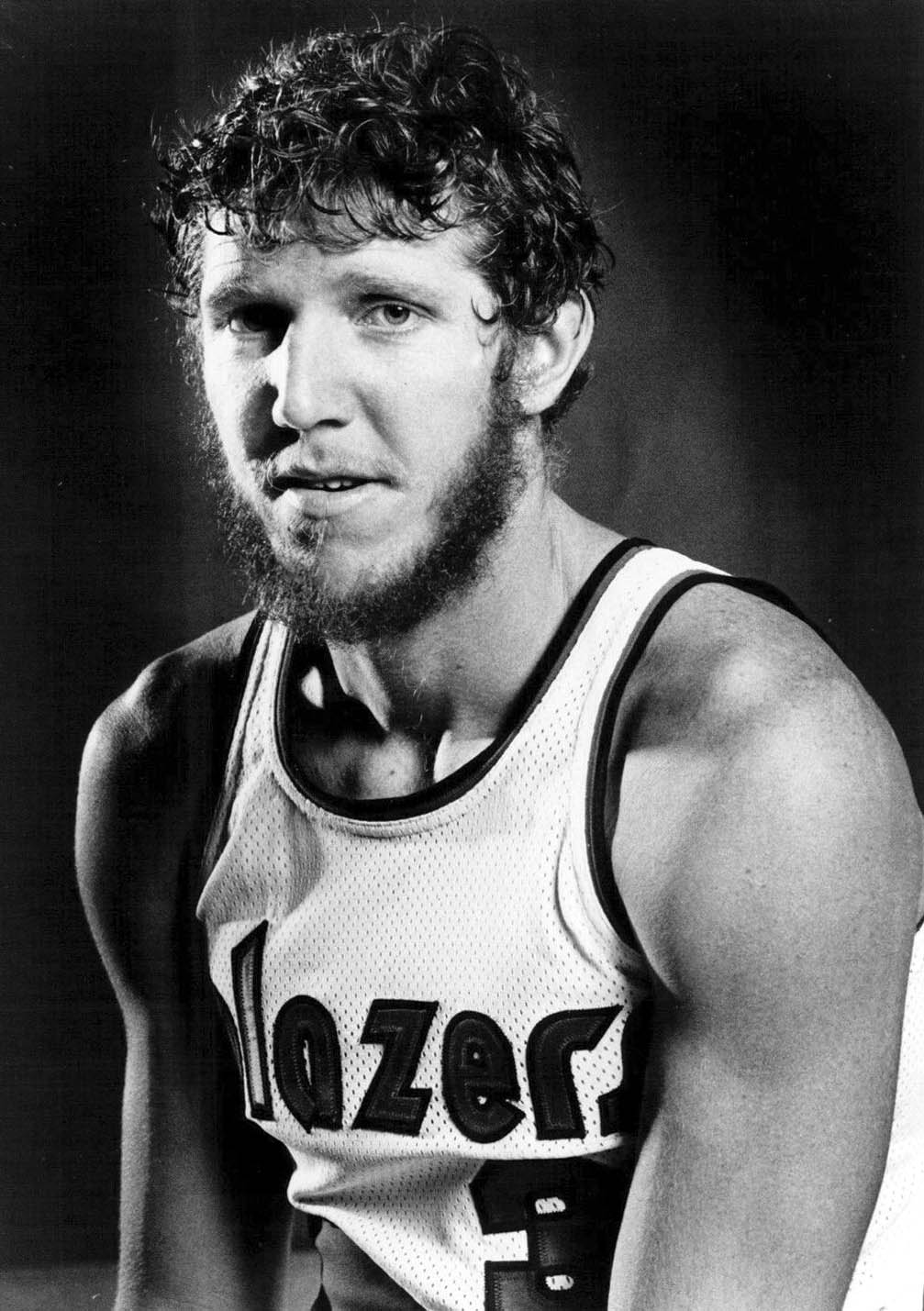
Bill Walton

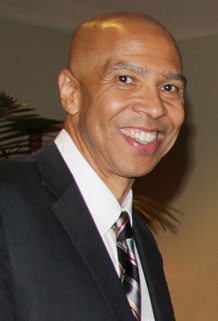
Mychal Thompson

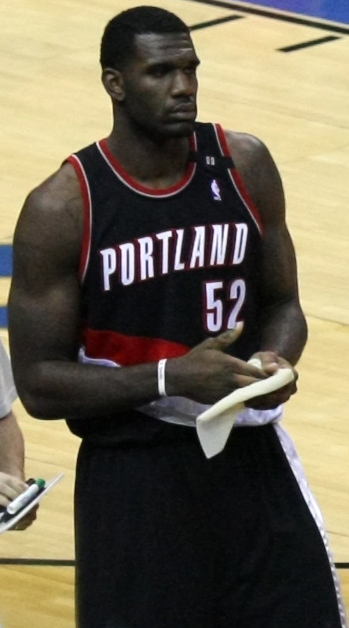
Greg Oden

The Blazers have had the first pick in the NBA draft four times in franchise history: 1972 (Martin), 1974 (Walton), 1978 (Thompson), and 2007 (Oden).

The Blazers have had the first pick in the NBA draft four times in franchise history. In 1972, they chose center LaRue Martin from Loyola Chicago. The team then chose UCLA center Bill Walton in 1974, forward/center Mychal Thompson from Minnesota in 1978 after a trade the day before the draft with the Indiana Pacers to acquire the pick, and most recently Greg Oden center from Ohio State in 2007.

Martin spent his entire career in Portland, playing from 1972 to 1976, and averaged 5.3 points, 4.6 rebounds, and 0.7 assists in 271 games. Walton played for the Blazers from 1974–1979, helping lead the team to the only championship in franchise history in 1977. The team defeated the Philadelphia 76ers 4–2 and Walton was named as the Finals MVP after averaging 18.5 points, 19.0 rebounds, 5.2 assists, and 3.7 blocks during the series. Walton went on to win the NBA Most Valuable Player Award the following season. Other accomplishments Walton achieved while in Portland are being a 2x All-Star, 2x All-NBA Team, including First Team in 1978, and 2x All-Defensive First Team. He also led the league in rebounding (14.37 per game) and blocks (3.5 per game) in 1977. In his Blazers career, Walton averaged 17.1 points, a franchise record 13.5 rebounds, 4.4 assists, and a franchise co-leader 2.6 blocks in 209 games. Thompson played in Portland from 1978–1986, where he was named NBA All-Rookie First Team in 1979. He averaged 16.7 points, 8.9 rebounds, and 3.4 assists in 551 games. He is the franchise leader for total blocks (768) and second in defensive rebounds (3,389). Oden had a lot of hype coming out of Ohio State, with a strong debate over who the Blazers should choose between him and Kevin Durant. Oden was in Portland from 2007–2012, only playing in 82 games total due to an injury riddled career that began before he could even play an NBA game, as he had season-ending microfracture surgery before his rookie season began. Oden averaged 9.4 points, 7.4 rebounds, and 0.6 assists per game.

=== Rookies of the year ===
Portland has had four players named Rookie of the Year, three of whom were drafted by the team: Petrie, Sidney Wicks, and Lillard. Wicks was drafted 2nd overall in 1971. He played with the team from 1971 to 1976, where he was a 4x All-Star. He averaged the most minutes played per game (38.8) in franchise history, as well as the second most rebounds per game (10.3), and he is tied for the second most triple-doubles (7). Wicks averaged 22.3 points, 10.3 rebounds, and 4.1 assists in 398 games.

=== Franchise stat leaders ===
Clyde Drexler is one of the most accomplished players in franchise history. The Blazers drafted Drexler #14 overall in 1983 out of Houston. Drexler was an eight time All-Star in Portland, while also being named to an All-NBA Team four times, including First Team in 1992. Drexler scored 18,040 points, which ranks second in franchise history, only behind Damian Lillard. He is the franchise leader for games played (867), minutes played (29,496), two-point field goals made (6,425), total field goals (6,889), offensive rebounds (2,227), steals (1,795), steals per game (2.1), and triple doubles (18). Along with points, Drexler is second for free throws made (3,798) and total rebounds (5,339). As a Blazer, Drexler averaged 20.8 points, 6.2 rebounds, 5.7 assists, and 2.1 steals in 867 games.

Lillard was drafted 6th overall in 2012 after a trade deadline deal with the New Jersey Nets the previous March. Lillard became just the fourth player to unanimously win the Rookie of the Year Award. He was a 7x All-Star, 7x All-NBA, including First Team in 2018, NBA Three-Point Contest champion in 2023 and 2024, and NBA Teammate of the Year in 2021. Lillard became the team's all-time scoring leader on December 19, 2022, passing Drexler. Later that season, Lillard broke his own franchise record for points in a game, scoring 71 points and making 13 three pointers in a 131–114 victory over the Houston Rockets. At the age of 32, Lillard became the oldest player in NBA history to score 70 points in a game, and the only player age 30 or older to accomplish the feat. Along with being the franchise scoring leader, Lillard is also the record holder for points per game (25.2), free throw percentage (.895), three point field goals (2,387), and made free throws (4,427). He is second for minutes played (27,942), field goals made (6,281), and assists (5,151). Lillard averaged the aforementioned franchise high 25.2 points, along with 4.2 rebounds, 6.7 assists, and 3.1 three pointers made in 769 games.

=== NBA anniversary teams and Olympians ===
Walton and Drexler were both named to the NBA 50th and 75th anniversary teams in 1996 and 2021 respectively, while Lillard was named to the 75th anniversary team. During their time with the Blazers, both Drexler and Lillard won Olympic gold medals. Drexler won at the 1992 Summer Olympics in Barcelona as a member of the Dream Team, and Lillard won at the 2020 Summer Olympics in Tokyo. Arvydas Sabonis won one gold and two bronze medals, winning one of the bronzes as a member of the Blazers while representing Lithuania in 1996 in Atlanta.

=== Retired numbers ===
Nine draft picks have had their number retired by the Blazers, most of whom were part of the 1977 championship team: Dave Twardzik (#13), Lionel Hollins (#14), Larry Steele (#15), Drexler (#22), Bob Gross (#30), Terry Porter (#30), Walton (#32), Lloyd Neal (#36), and Petrie (#45). Twardzik was drafted 20th overall in 1972, but played for the Virginia Squires of the American Basketball Association (ABA) before he joined the Blazers. He played with the team from 1976–1980 and was part of the championship team in 1977. He averaged 9.5 points, 2.2 rebounds, and 3.4 assists in 280 games. Hollins was drafted 6th overall in 1975 and played in Portland from 1975–1980, winning the championship with the team. He was an All-Star once and a member of the NBA All-Defensive Team twice, including First Team in 1978. Hollins averaged 13.9 points, 2.6 rebounds, 4.4 assists, and 1.9 steals in 315 games. Steele was another member of the championship team after being drafted 31st overall in 1971, playing from 1971–1979. He led the NBA in steals in 1974, playing in a total of 610 games, averaging 8.2 points, 2.9 rebounds, 2.8 assists, and 1.8 assists. Gross was drafted 25th overall in the 1975 NBA draft and played for Portland from 1975–1982. He was a member of the championship team and part of the NBA All-Defensive Second Team in 1978. He averaged 9.2 points, 4.5 rebounds, 3.0 assists, and 1.2 steals in 486 games. Porter was drafted 24th overall in the 1985 NBA draft and was a 2x All-Star. He played for the Blazers from 1985–1995. He is the franchise leader for total assists (5,319), second in steals (1,182), and is tied for second for triple-doubles (7). Porter averaged 14.9 points, 3.5 rebounds, and 7.0 assists in 758 games. Neal was drafted 31st overall in 1972 and was named to the NBA All-Rookie First Team. He was a member of the championship team, playing in Portland from 1972 to 1979. He averaged 11.1 points, 7.7 rebounds, and 1.5 assists in 435 games.

=== Hall of famers ===
Six players who have played for the Blazers in their careers have been inducted into the Naismith Memorial Basketball Hall of Fame, with four of them being drafted by Portland: Walton (inducted in 1993), Dražen Petrović (2002), Drexler (2004 as a player, 2010 as a member of the Dream Team), and Sabonis (2011). Drexler and the Dream Team were also inducted into the U.S. Olympic Hall of Fame in 2009, while Petrović (2007, posthumously) and Sabonis (2010) were inducted into the FIBA Hall of Fame. Petrović was drafted 60th overall in the 1986 NBA draft, but stayed overseas for a few seasons. He played from 1989–1991 in Portland, where he averaged 7.0 points, 1.4 rebounds, and 1.4 assists in 95 games. Sabonis was drafted #24 overall in 1986 NBA draft, but did not play for the Blazers until the 1995–96 NBA season at the age of 30. He was named NBA All-Rookie First Team and played with Portland until he retired from the NBA after the 2000–01 NBA season. Sabonis returned to the team for the 2002–03 NBA season after a season with Žalgiris before permanently retiring from the NBA. For his career in Portland, Sabonis averaged 12.0 points, 7.3 rebounds, 2.1 assists, and 1.1 blocks in 470 games.

== Selections ==
The Blazers have made a total of 284 selections since their first draft in 1970. As a result of trades prior to the drafts, the team had no picks in 1998, 1999, 2014, 2016, 2021 or 2026.

Position key
Abbreviation	Meaning	Abbreviation	Meaning
G	Guard	PG	Point guard
SG	Shooting guard	F	Forward
SF	Small forward	PF	Power forward
C	Center	—N/a	—N/a

Accomplishments key
Symbol	Meaning	Symbol	Meaning
*	Hall of Famer	(#)	Retired Blazers' Number
§	All-Star	+	First Overall Draft Pick
‡	Hall of Fame, All-Star, and first overall pick	†	Hall of Fame and All-Star
Δ	All-Star and Rookie of the Year	—N/a	—N/a

Portland Trail Blazers draft picks
Draft	Round	Pick	Player	Nationality	Position	From
1970	1	8	Geoff Petrie^{Δ} (#45)	United States	G	Princeton
1970	2	25	Walt Gilmore	United States	F	Fort Valley State
1970	3	42	Bill Cain	United States	F	Iowa State
1970	4	59	Jim Penix	United States	G	Bowling Green
1970	5	76	Ron Knight	United States	F	Cal State Los Angeles
1970	6	93	George Janky	United States	F	Dayton
1970	7	110	Claude English	United States	F	Rhode Island
1970	8	127	Doug Boyd	United States	F	TCU
1970	9	144	Billy Gaskins	United States	G	Oregon
1970	10	161	Israel Oliver	United States	F	Elizabeth City State
1970	11	176	Dan McLemore	United States	F	Bowling Green
1970	12	188	Paul Adams	United States	F	Central Washington
1970	13	199	Alex Boyd	United States	F	Nevada
1970	14	208	Frank Lothridge	United States	F	UT Rio Grande Valley
1970	15	218	Wayne Canaday	United States	F	Miami (FL)
1970	16	226	Doug Williams	United States	F	St. Mary's (Texas)
1970	18	235	Bruce Butchko	United States	F	Southern Illinois
1970	19	239	Mark Gabriel	United States	F	Hanover College
1971	1	2	Sidney Wicks^{Δ}	United States	F/C	UCLA
1971	2	25	Charlie Yelverton (from San Francisco) (Note: On March 23, 1971, the Portland Trail Blazers acquired 1971 and 1972 second round picks and a 1971 third round pick from the San Francisco Warriors in exchange for Jim Barnett. The Blazers used the picks to draft Charlie Yelverton, Dave Twardzik, and William Smith.)	United States	G/F	Fordham
1971	2	27	Rick Fisher (from Baltimore) (Note: On October 22, 1970, the Portland Trail Blazers acquired a second round pick from the Baltimore Bullets in exchange for Dorie Murrey. The Blazers used the pick to draft Rick Fisher.)	United States	F	Colorado State
1971	3	37	Larry Steele (#15)	United States	G/F	Kentucky
1971	3	42	William Smith (from San Francisco)	United States	C	Syracuse
1971	4	54	Bobby Fields	United States	G	La Salle
1971	5	71	Hector Blondet	Puerto Rico	SG	Murray State
1971	6	88	Jim Day	United States	F	Morehead State
1971	7	105	Gene Knolle	United States	G	Texas Tech
1971	8	122	John Sutter	United States	F	Tulane
1971	9	139	Goo Kennedy	United States	F/C	Texas Christian
1971	10	155	Greg Starrick	United States	G	Southern Illinois
1971	11	171	Howard Burford	United States	F	Gonzaga
1971	12	185	Don Sechler	United States	C	Delaware Valley College
1972	1	1	LaRue Martin^{*}	United States	C	Loyola (Chicago)
1972	2	14	Bob Davis	United States	F	Weber State
1972	2	26	Dave Twardzik (#13) (from Golden State)	United States	G	Old Dominion
1972	2	30	Ollie Johnson (from Los Angeles) (Note: On September 11, 1971, the Portland Trail Blazers acquired a second round pick from the Los Angeles Lakers in exchange for LeRoy Ellis. The Blazers used the pick to draft Ollie Johnson.)	United States	F	Temple
1972	3	31	Lloyd Neal (#36)	United States	F/C	Tennessee State
1972	4	48	Gary Stewart	United States	F	Canisius
1972	5	64	Mike Reid	United States	G	UC Riverside
1972	6	81	Joe Gaines	United States	F	Belmont
1972	7	98	Bob Lynn	United States	F	Cal State Long Beach
1972	8	114	Ruben Vance	United States	G	Kent State
1972	9	130	Scott McCandlish	United States	C	Virginia
1972	10	144	Krešimir Ćosić	Croatia	C	BYU
1972	11	157	Jimmy Wilkins	United States	G	San Diego State
1972	13	175	Larry Morris	United States	F	Tulsa
1972	14	181	Paul Kelley	United States	F	Shaw
1972	15	188	Rich Habegger	United States	F	Wake Forest
1972	16	193	Mose Adolph	United States	G	Cal State Los Angeles
1973	1	15	Barry Parkhill (from Los Angeles via Cleveland) (Note: On the draft day, the Cleveland Cavaliers acquired a first round pick and a third round pick from the Portland Trail Blazers in exchange for John Johnson, Rick Roberson and a Los Angeles Lakers' first round pick. The Cavaliers used the picks to draft Jim Brewer and Jim O'Brien. The Blazers used the pick to draft Barry Parkhill.)	United States	G	Virginia
1973	4	55	Bird Averitt	United States	G	Pepperdine
1973	5	71	Fran Costello	United States	F	Providence
1973	6	89	Neal Jurgensen	United States	F	Oregon State
1973	7	105	Larry Hollyfield	United States	F	UCLA
1973	8	123	Lindell Reason	United States	G	Eastern Michigan
1973	9	139	Mike Contreras	United States	G	Arizona State
1973	10	154	Sam Whitehead	United States	F	Oregon State
1973	11	167	Eddie Payne	United States	G	Wake Forest
1973	12	177	Rick Holdt	United States	F	NC State
1974	1	1	Bill Walton^{‡} (#32)	United States	F/C	UCLA
1974	2	20	Jan van Breda Kolff	United States	G/F	Vanderbilt
1974	2	34	Phil Lumpkin (from Chicago) (Note: On October 14, 1973, the Portland Trail Blazers acquired a second round pick from the Chicago Bulls in exchange for Rick Adelman. The Blazers used the pick to draft Phil Lumpkin.)	United States	G	Miami (Ohio)
1974	2	36	Rubin Collins (from Milwaukee via Philadelphia) (Note: On September 11, 1972, the Portland Trail Blazers acquired a second round pick from the Philadelphia 76ers as compensation for the signing of Gary Gregor as a free agent. Previously, the 76ers acquired the pick and future consideration (the 76ers acquired John Block on July 28, 1972) on December 13, 1971, from the Milwaukee Bucks in exchange for Wali Jones. The Blazers used the pick to draft Rubin Collins.)	United States	G	Maryland-Eastern Shore
1974	4	56	Mickey Johnson	United States	F	Aurora
1974	5	74	Bernard Hardin	United States	F	New Mexico
1974	6	92	Daniel Anderson	United States	G	USC
1974	7	110	Doug Richards	United States	G	BYU
1974	8	128	Eldridge Broussard	United States	G	Pacific University
1974	9	146	Lee Haven	United States	G	Colorado
1974	10	163	Ron Jones	United States	G	Oregon State
1975	1	6	Lionel Hollins^{§} (#14)	United States	G	Arizona State
1975	2	25	Bob Gross (#30)	United States	G/F	Long Beach State
1975	3	42	Tom Roy	United States	F	Maryland
1975	3	50	Gus Gerard (from Chicago) (Note: On September 18, 1974, the Portland Trail Blazers acquired a third round pick from the Chicago Bulls in exchange for Mickey Johnson. The Blazers used the pick to draft Gus Gerard.)	United States	G/F	Spirits of St. Louis (ABA)
1975	4	61	Phil Hicks	United States	F	Tulane
1975	5	78	Maurice Presley	United States	C	Houston
1975	6	97	Gerald Willett	United States	F	Oregon
1975	7	114	Steve Fields	United States	F	Miami University
1975	8	133	Charlie Neal	United States	G	Oregon State
1975	9	149	Quentin Braxton	United States	F	Portland
1975	10	166	Tyree Foster	United States	F	Portland
1976	1	5	Wally Walker	United States	F	Virginia
1976	2	20	Major Jones (from Kansas City via New Orleans) (Note: On September 16, 1974, the Portland Trail Blazers acquired Barry Clemens and future consideration (the Blazers acquired a second round pick on May 25, 1976) from the New Orleans Jazz in exchange for Rick Roberson. Previously, the Jazz acquired Ron Behagen and the pick on May 28, 1975, from the Kansas City Kings in exchange for a 1975 first-round pick. The Blazers used the pick to draft Major Jones.)	United States	F	Albany State
1976	2	22	Johnny Davis	United States	G	Dayton
1976	3	39	Jeff Tyson	United States	G	Western Michigan
1976	4	56	David Everett	United States	G	Grand Canyon
1976	5	73	Gary Redding	United States	F	Auburn
1976	7	109	Al DeWitt	United States	F	Weber State
1976	8	127	Brant Gibler	United States	F	Puget Sound
1976	9	145	Rob Torresdal	United States	F	Linfield University
1976	10	162	Marquinhos Leite	Brazil	C	Pepperdine
1977	1	19	Rich Laurel	United States	G	Hofstra
1977	2	28	Kim Anderson (from New Orleans) (Note: On June 3, 1976, the Portland Trail Blazers acquired a 1977 second-round pick from the New Orleans Jazz in exchange for a 1976 second round pick. The Blazers used the pick to draft Kim Anderson.)	United States	F	Missouri
1977	2	41	T.R. Dunn	United States	G/F	Alabama
1977	3	63	Ricky Brown	United States	C	Alabama
1977	4	85	Greg White	United States	F	USC
1977	5	107	Donn Wilber	United States	C	La Salle
1977	6	128	Myron Jordan	United States	F	University of the Pacific
1977	7	148	Don Smith	United States	F	Oregon State
1977	8	167	Harold Rhodes	United States	G	Washington
1978	1	1	Mychal Thompson^{*} (from Indiana) (Note: On June 8, 1978, the Portland Trail Blazers acquired the first pick from the Indiana Pacers in exchange for Johnny Davis and the third pick. Previously, the Blazers acquired a first-round pick on October 18, 1976, from the Buffalo Braves in exchange for Moses Malone. The Blazers used the pick to draft Mychal Thompson.)	Bahamas	F/C	Minnesota
1978	1	7	Ron Brewer (from Detroit via Seattle) (Note: On November 11, 1977, the Portland Trail Blazers acquired a 1978 first round pick and a 1979 second round pick from the Seattle SuperSonics in exchange for Wally Walker. Previously, the Sonics acquired the pick on September 25, 1975, from the Detroit Pistons in exchange for Archie Clark. The Blazers used the pick to draft Ron Brewer.)	United States	G	Arkansas
1978	2	24	Keith Herron (from Buffalo via Atlanta) (Note: On September 13, 1977, the Atlanta Hawks traded Bill Willoughby to the Buffalo Braves for a 1978 second round pick. On October 5, 1977, Portland traded the rights to Rich Laurel to Atlanta for a 1978 second round pick. The Blazers used the pick to draft Keith Herron.)	United States	G/F	Villanova
1978	2	44	Clemon Johnson	United States	F/C	Florida A&M
1978	3	66	Sterling Edmonds	United States	F	Dartmouth
1978	5	110	Clay Johnson	United States	G	Missouri
1978	6	131	Tim Evans	United States	F	Puget Sound
1978	7	152	Walter Reason	United States	G	Pacific University
1978	8	170	Mark Wickman	United States	F	Linfield University
1978	9	186	Paul Cozens	United States	F	Holy Cross
1978	10	202	Tim Warkentin	United States	F	Biola University
1979	1	12	Jim Paxson^{§}	United States	G/F	Dayton
1979	2	40	Andrew Fields (from San Antonio via Seattle) (Note: On November 11, 1977, the Blazers traded Wally Walker to the Seattle SuperSonics for a 1978 first round pick (#7 overall – Ron Brewer) and a 1979 second round pick. On November 12, 1977, Seattle traded Mike Green to the San Antonio Spurs for a 1978 second round pick and a 1979 second round pick. The Blazers used the pick to draft Andrew Fields.)	United States	F	Cheyney State
1979	3	56	Mickey Fox	United States	G	Saint Mary's University
1979	4	78	Darryl Robinson	United States	G	Appalachian State
1979	5	100	Matt White	United States	C	Penn
1979	6	120	Ray Ellis	United States	C	Pepperdine
1979	7	140	Jeff Tropf	United States	F	Central Michigan
1979	8	159	Willie Pounds	United States	F	Chaminade University of Honolulu
1979	9	177	Stan Eckwood	United States	G	Harding University
1979	10	195	Kelvin Small	United States	F	Oregon
1980	1	10	Ronnie Lester (traded to Chicago) (Note: The Portland Trail Blazers acquired the draft rights to fourth pick Kelvin Ransey and a 1981 first round pick from the Chicago Bulls in exchange for the draft rights to tenth pick Ronnie Lester and a 1981 first round pick.)	United States	G	Iowa
1980	2	32	David Lawrence (from Indiana) (Note: On June 30, 1978, the Blazers traded David "Corky" Calhoun to the Indiana Pacers for a 1980 second round pick. The Blazers used the pick to draft David Lawrence.)	United States	F	McNeese State
1980	2	33	Bruce Collins	United States	G/F	Weber State
1980	3	56	Mike Harper	United States	F/C	North Park
1980	4	79	Kelvin Henderson	United States	F	Saint Louis
1980	5	102	Larry Belin	United States	F	New Mexico
1980	6	125	Perry Mirkovich	Canada	G	University of Lethbridge
1980	7	148	Gig Sims	United States	C	UCLA
1980	8	168	John Stroeder	United States	F	Montana
1980	9	188	Rick Boucher	United States	G	Maine
1980	10	205	Dave Kufeld	United States	F	Yeshiva University
1981	1	15	Jeff Lamp	United States	G/F	Virginia
1981	1	16	Darnell Valentine (from Chicago) (Note: On June 8, 1981, the Atlanta Hawks acquired a 1981 first round pick and a 1981 second round pick from the Chicago Bulls in exchange for a 1981 first round pick, a 1982 second round pick and an option to swap 1982 first round draft picks. Previously, the Bulls acquired the draft rights to Ronnie Lester and the first round pick on June 10, 1980, from the Blazers in exchange for the draft rights to Kelvin Ransey and a 1981 first round pick. Previously, the Blazers acquired the pick on February 8, 1980, from the Philadelphia 76ers in exchange for Lionel Hollins. Previously, the 76ers acquired the pick and a 1983 first round pick on October 3, 1977, from the Cleveland Cavaliers in exchange for Terry Furlow. The Blazers used the pick to draft Darnell Valentine.)	United States	G	Kansas
1981	2	26	Brian Jackson (from New Jersey via Indiana) (Note: On October 9, 1979, the Portland Trail Blazers acquired a second round pick from the Indiana Pacers in exchange for Clemon Johnson. Previously, the Pacers acquired Bob Carrington, 1980 and 1981 second round picks on January 27, 1978, from the New Jersey Nets in exchange for John Williamson. The Blazers used the pick to draft Brian Jackson.)	United States	F	Utah State
1981	3	50	Derek Holcomb (from Cleveland) (Note: On August 24, 1979, the Blazers traded Willie Smith to the Cleveland Cavaliers for a 1981 third round pick. The Blazers used the pick to select Derek Holcomb.)	United States	C	Illinois
1981	3	61	Pétur Guðmundsson	Iceland	C	Washington
1981	4	85	Peter Verhoeven	United States	F	Fresno State
1981	5	107	Herb Andrew	United States	G	South Alabama
1981	6	131	Roshern Amie	United States	F	UTEP
1981	7	153	Julius Wayne	United States	G	UTEP
1981	8	176	John Smith	United States	F	Saint Joseph's
1981	9	196	Sid Williams	United States	F	San Jose State
1981	10	217	Steve Cochran	United States	G	Lewis & Clark College
1982	1	11	Lafayette Lever^{§}	United States	PG	Arizona State
1982	2	33	Linton Townes	United States	SF	James Madison
1982	2	37	Audie Norris (from Golden State) (Note: On June 8, 1981, the Blazers traded Mike Gale to the Golden State Warriors for a 1982 second round pick (#37-Audie Norris) and a 1985 second round pick (#25-Mike Smrek).)	United States	C	Jackson State
1982	3	66	Phillip Lockett (from Milwaukee) (Note: On September 24, 1981, the Blazers traded Geoff Crompton to the Milwaukee Bucks for a 1982 third round pick. The Blazers used the pick to select Phillip Lockett.)	United States	F	Alabama
1982	4	79	Eric Smith	United States	F	Georgetown
1982	5	103	Cherokee Rhone	United States	F	Centenary
1982	6	125	Leo Cunningham	United States	C	Utah State
1982	7	149	Terry Long	United States	G	Lamar
1982	8	171	Dave Porter	United States	F	Western Oregon
1982	9	195	Mark Dearborn	United States	F	Saint Joseph's
1982	10	215	Grant Taylor	United States	F	UC Irvine
1983	1	14	Clyde Drexler^{†} (#22) (from Denver) (Note: On August 15, 1980, Portland acquired a 1983 first round pick (#14-Clyde Drexler) and a 1984 second round pick (#33-Steve Colter) from Denver in exchange for T. R. Dunn and a 1983 first round pick.)	United States	SG	Houston
1983	2	39	Granville Waiters	United States	C	Ohio State
1983	3	62	Tom Piotrowski	United States	C	La Salle
1983	4	85	Tim Dunham	United States	G	Chaminade University of Honolulu
1983	5	108	Gary Monroe	United States	F	Wright State
1983	6	131	Derrick Pope	United States	F	Montana
1983	7	154	Paul Little	United States	F	Penn
1983	8	177	Frank Smith	United States	C	Arizona
1983	9	199	Phil Hopson	United States	F	Idaho
1983	10	220	Russ Christianson	United States	F	Eastern Oregon
1984	1	2	Sam Bowie (from Indiana) (Note: On June 5, 1981, Portland acquired a first round pick from Indiana in exchange for Tom Owens. Portland used the pick to draft Sam Bowie.)	United States	F/C	Kentucky
1984	1	19	Bernard Thompson	United States	G/F	Fresno State
1984	2	26	Victor Fleming (from Chicago via Indiana) (Note: On August 18, 1983, Portland acquired a second round pick from Indiana in exchange for Granville Waiters. Previously, Indiana acquired the draft rights to Sidney Lowe and the pick on June 28, 1983, from Chicago in exchange for the draft rights to Mitchell Wiggins. Portland used the pick to draft Victor Fleming.)	United States	G	Xavier
1984	2	33	Steve Colter (from Denver)	United States	G	New Mexico State
1984	2	46	Jerome Kersey (from L.A. Lakers) (Note: On October 8, 1980, Portland acquired a second round pick from the Los Angeles Lakers in exchange for Jim Brewer. Portland used the pick to draft Jerome Kersey.)	United States	F	Longwood
1984	3	65	Tim Kearney	United States	C	West Virginia
1984	4	88	Brett Applegate	United States	F	BYU
1984	5	111	Mike Whitmarsh	United States	F	San Diego
1984	6	134	Lance Ball	United States	C	Western Oregon
1984	7	157	Victor Anger	United States	F	Pepperdine
1984	8	180	Steve Flint	United States	F	UC San Diego
1984	9	202	Dennis Black	United States	F	Portland
1984	10	224	Randy Dunn	United States	F	George Fox
1985	1	24	Terry Porter^{§} (#30) (from Boston via Dallas) (Note: On June 28, 1982, the Blazers traded Kelvin Ransey to the Dallas Mavericks for Wayne Cooper and a 1985 first round pick. On May 1, 1985, Dallas traded a 1985 first round pick to Boston for a 1985 first round pick and a 1988 second round pick. The Blazers used the pick to draft Terry Porter.)	United States	PG	Wisconsin–Stevens Point
1985	2	25	Mike Smrek (from Golden State)	Canada	C	Canisius
1985	2	39	George Montgomery	United States	C	Illinois
1985	3	61	Perry Young	United States	SG	Virginia Tech
1985	4	85	Joe Atkinson	United States	F	Oklahoma State
1985	5	107	James Anderson	United States	F	Union College
1985	6	131	Curtis Moore	United States	G	Nebraska
1985	7	153	Mark Owen	United States	G	College of Idaho
1986	1	14	Walter Berry	United States	PF	St. John's
1986	1	24	Arvydas Sabonis^{*} (from Boston via L.A. Clippers) (Note: On September 6, 1985, the Los Angeles Clippers traded Bill Walton to the Celtics for Cedric Maxwell and a 1986 first round pick. On January 14, 1986, Portland traded Darnell Valentine and a 1988 second round pick to the Clippers for a 1986 first round pick and a 1988 second round pick. The Blazers used the first round pick to draft Arvydas Sabonis.)	Soviet Union (Lithuania)	C	Zalgiris (USSR/Lithuania)
1986	2	37	Panagiotis Fasoulas	Greece	C	NC State
1986	3	49	Juden Smith (from Indiana) (Note: On October 7, 1983, the Blazers traded Hank McDowell to the Indiana Pacers for a 1986 third round pick. The Blazers used the pick to select Juden Smith.)	United States	F	UTEP
1986	3	60	Dražen Petrović^{*}	Yugoslavia (Croatia)	SG	Cibona (Yugoslavia/Croatia)
1986	4	83	David Shaffer	United States	F	Florida State
1986	5	106	Jerry Adams	United States	F	Oregon
1986	6	129	Tony Hampton	United States	G	Montana State
1986	7	152	Randy Schiff	United States	G	Linfield University
1987	1	17	Ronnie Murphy	United States	SG	Jacksonville
1987	2	29	Lester Fonville (from Indiana) (Note: On September 6, 1983, the Blazers traded Linton Townes to the Cleveland Cavaliers for a 1987 second round pick. The Blazers used the pick to select Lester Fonville.)	United States	C	Jackson State
1987	2	30	Nikita Wilson (from Phoenix) (Note: On June 14, 1985, the Blazers traded Bernard Thompson to the Phoenix Suns for a 1987 second round pick. The Blazers used the pick to select Nikita Wilson.)	United States	PF	LSU
1987	3	63	Kevin Gamble	United States	SG	Iowa
1987	4	86	Norwood Barber	United States	G	Florida State
1987	5	109	David Moss	United States	F	Tulsa
1987	6	132	Bernard Jackson	United States	G	Loyola Chicago
1987	7	155	Kenny Stone	United States	F	George Fox
1988	1	21	Mark Bryant	United States	PF	Seton Hall
1988	2	26	Rolando Ferreira	Brazil	C	Arizona
1988	3	53	Anthony Mason^{§} (from Golden State) (Note: On October 11, 1987, the Blazers agreed to waive the rights of free agent Kermit Washington to the Golden State Warriors for a 1988 third round pick. The Blazers used the pick to draft Anthony Mason.)	United States	F	Tennessee State
1988	3	71	Craig Neal	United States	G	Georgia Tech
1989	1	22	Byron Irvin	United States	SG	Missouri
1989	2	36	Clifford Robinson^{§}	United States	PF/C	Connecticut
1990	1	25	Alaa Abdelnaby	Egypt; United States	PF	Duke
1991	2	54	Marcus Kennedy	United States	PF	Eastern Michigan
1992	1	26	Dave Johnson	United States	SF	Syracuse
1992	2	31	Reggie Smith	United States	C	TCU
1993	1	21	James Robinson	United States	SG	Alabama
1993	2	48	Kevin Thompson	United States	C	NC State
1994	1	17	Aaron McKie	United States	SG	Temple
1994	2	43	Shawnelle Scott	United States	C	St. John's
1995	1	8	Shawn Respert (from Detroit, traded to Milwaukee) (Note: On June 26, 1995, the Blazers traded a two 1995 first round picks and a 1995 second round pick to the Detroit Pistons for a 1995 first round pick. On June 28, 1995, Portland acquired the draft rights to Gary Trent from the Milwaukee Bucks for the draft rights of Shawn Respert.)	United States	SG	Michigan State
1996	1	17	Jermaine O'Neal^{§}	United States	F/C	Eau Claire HS (Columbia, South Carolina)
1996	2	46	Marcus Brown	United States	G	Murray State
1997	2	48	Alvin Williams	United States	G	Villanova
2000	1	28	Erick Barkley	United States	PG	St. John's
2001	1	19	Zach Randolph^{§}	United States	PF	Michigan State
2001	2	49	Ruben Boumtje-Boumtje	Cameroon	C	Georgetown
2002	1	21	Qyntel Woods	United States	SF	NE Mississippi CC
2002	2	43	Jason Jennings (from Toronto via Chicago) (Note: On July 13, 2001, the Chicago Bulls traded Brian Skinner to the Toronto Raptors for Charles Oakley and a 2002 second round pick. On July 19, 2001, the Blazers traded Greg Anthony to the Bulls for a second round pick (protected #51–57 in 2002, unprotected in 2003). The Blazers used the pick to select Jason Jennings.)	United States	C	Arkansas State
2002	2	51	Federico Kammerichs	Argentina	SF	Ourense (Spain)
2003	1	23	Travis Outlaw	United States	SF	Starkville HS (Starkville, Mississippi)
2003	2	54	Nedžad Sinanović	Bosnia and Herzegovina	C	Brotnjo (Bosnia and Herzegovina)
2004	1	13	Sebastian Telfair	United States	PG	Lincoln HS (Brooklyn, New York)
2004	1	23	Sergei Monia	Russia	SG	CSKA Moscow (Russian Basketball Super League)
2004	2	47	Ha Seung-Jin	South Korea	C	Yonsei University (South Korea)
2005	1	6	Martell Webster (from Utah) (Note: Hours before the start of the draft, Utah acquired the 3rd pick from Portland in exchange for the 6th pick, the 27th pick and a 2006 first round draft pick. Previously, Utah acquired a 2005 first round draft pick on June 24, 2004, from Dallas in exchange for the draft rights to Pavel Podkolzin. Portland used the 6th and the 27th pick to draft Martell Webster and Linas Kleiza.)	United States	G/F	Seattle Prep. School (Seattle, Washington)
2005	1	27	Linas Kleiza (from Dallas via Utah, traded to Denver) (Note: Portland acquired the draft rights to 22nd pick Jarrett Jack from Denver in exchange for the draft rights to 27th pick Linas Kleiza and the draft rights to 35th pick Ricky Sánchez.)	Lithuania	F	Missouri
2005	2	35	Ricky Sánchez	Puerto Rico	F	IMG Academy (Bradenton, Florida)
2006	1	4	Tyrus Thomas (traded to Chicago) (Note: Portland acquired the draft rights to 2nd pick LaMarcus Aldridge and a 2007 second round pick (#53 – Demetris Nichols) from Chicago in exchange for the draft rights to 4th pick Tyrus Thomas and Viktor Khryapa.)	United States	F	LSU
2006	1	30	Joel Freeland (from Detroit via Utah) (Note: On June 28, 2005, Portland acquired Detroit's 2006 first round draft pick, the 6th and 27th pick in 2005 from Utah in exchange for the 3rd pick in 2005. Previously, Utah acquired a 2006 first round draft pick and Elden Campbell on January 21, 2005, from Detroit in exchange for Carlos Arroyo. Portland used the 30th pick to draft Joel Freeland.)	United Kingdom	F	Gran Canaria (Spain)
2006	2	31	James White (traded to Indiana) (Note: Memphis acquired the draft rights to 45th pick Alexander Johnson from Portland in exchange for a 2008 second round draft pick. Previously, Portland acquired the draft rights to the 45th pick Alexander Johnson, 2007 and 2008 second round draft picks from Indiana in exchange for the draft rights to 31st pick James White.)	United States	G	Cincinnati
2007	1	1	Greg Oden^{*}	United States	C	Ohio State
2007	2	37	Josh McRoberts	United States	F	Duke
2007	2	42	Derrick Byars (from Indiana, (Note: On June 28, 2006, Portland acquired 2007 and 2008 second-round draft picks and the draft rights to Alexander Johnson from Indiana in exchange for the draft rights to James White. Portland used the 42nd pick to draft Derrick Byars.) traded to Philadelphia) (Note: Portland acquired the draft rights to 30th pick Petteri Koponen from Philadelphia in exchange for the draft rights to 42nd pick Derrick Byars and cash considerations.)	United States	G/F	Vanderbilt
2007	2	52	Taurean Green (from Toronto) (Note: On October 10, 1997, Portland acquired a 2007 second round draft pick from the Toronto Raptors in a three-team trade with Toronto and the New York Knicks. Portland used the 52nd pick to draft Taurean Green.)	United States	G	Florida
2007	2	53	Demetris Nichols (from Chicago, traded to New York) (Note: New York acquired Zach Randolph, Dan Dickau, Fred Jones and the draft rights to 53rd pick Demetris Nichols from Portland in exchange for Steve Francis, Channing Frye and a 2008 second round pick (#36 – Ömer Aşık).)	United States	F	Syracuse
2008	1	13	Brandon Rush (traded to Indiana) (Note: Portland acquired the draft rights to 11th pick Jerryd Bayless and Ike Diogu from Indiana in exchange for the draft rights to 13th pick Brandon Rush, Jarrett Jack and Josh McRoberts. The trade was finalized on July 9, 2008.)	United States	F	Kansas
2008	2	33	Joey Dorsey (from Memphis (Note: On June 28, 2006, Portland acquired a 2008 second round draft pick from Memphis in exchange for the draft rights to Alexander Johnson. Portland used the pick to draft Joey Dorsey.), traded to Houston) (Note: In a three-team trade, Portland acquired the draft rights to 25th pick Nicolas Batum from Houston, Houston acquired the draft rights to 33rd pick Joey Dorsey from Portland and the draft rights to 28th pick Donté Greene and a 2009 second round draft pick from Memphis, and Memphis acquired the draft rights to 27th pick Darrell Arthur from Portland.)	United States	F	Memphis
2008	2	36	Ömer Aşık (from New York, traded to Chicago) (Note: In a three-team trade, Chicago acquired the draft rights to 36th pick Ömer Aşık from Portland, the Trail Blazers acquired a second round draft pick in 2009 from Denver and two future second round draft picks from Chicago, and Denver acquired the draft rights to 39th pick Sonny Weems from Chicago.)	Turkey	C	Fenerbahçe Ülker (Turkey)
2008	2	55	Mike Taylor (from Phoenix via Indiana (Note: On June 28, 2006, Portland acquired Indiana's 2007 and Phoenix's 2008 second round draft picks and the draft rights to Alexander Johnson from Indiana in exchange for the draft rights to James White. Previously, Indiana acquired a 2008 second-round draft pick on August 25, 2005, from Phoenix in exchange for James Jones. Portland used the pick to draft Mike Taylor.), traded to LA Clippers) (Note: The Los Angeles Clippers acquired the draft rights to 55th pick Mike Taylor from Portland in exchange for a 2009 second round draft pick.)	United States	G	Idaho Stampede (D-League)
2009	1	22	Víctor Claver (from Dallas) (Note: On June 24, 2009, Portland acquired the 22nd pick from Dallas in exchange for the 24th pick, 56th pick and a 2010 second round draft pick. Portland used the 22nd pick to draft Víctor Claver.)	Spain	SF	Pamesa Valencia (Spain)
2009	2	33	Dante Cunningham (from LA Clippers) (Note: On June 26, 2008, Portland acquired a 2009 second round draft pick from the Los Angeles Clippers in exchange for the draft rights to Mike Taylor. Portland used the 33rd pick to draft Dante Cunningham.)	United States	PF	Villanova
2009	2	38	Jon Brockman (from New York via Chicago, (Note: On June 26, 2008, Portland acquired a 2009 second round draft pick from Denver in a three-team trade with Denver and Chicago. Portland also acquired New York's 2009 second round draft pick and Chicago's 2010 second round draft pick from Chicago. Previously, Chicago acquired a 2006 first round draft pick, 2007 and 2009 second round draft picks, an option to exchange 2007 first round draft picks, Tim Thomas, Michael Sweetney and Jermaine Jackson on October 4, 2005, from New York in exchange for Eddy Curry and Antonio Davis. Portland used the 38th and 55th pick to draft Jon Brockman and Patrick Mills, respectively.) traded to Sacramento) (Note: On June 25, 2009, Portland acquired the draft rights to 31st pick Jeff Pendergraph from Sacramento in exchange for Sergio Rodríguez, the draft rights to 38th pick Jon Brockman and cash considerations.)	United States	PF	Washington
2009	2	55	Patrick Mills (from Denver)	Australia	PG	Saint Mary's (CA)
2010	1	22	Elliot Williams	United States	SG	Memphis
2010	2	34	Armon Johnson (from Golden State) (Note: On June 22, 2010, Milwaukee acquired Corey Maggette and the 44th pick in the 2010 draft from Golden State in exchange for Charlie Bell and Dan Gadzuric. Previously, Golden State acquired the 44th pick in the 2010 draft and cash considerations on June 21, 2010, from Portland in exchange for the 34th pick in the 2010 draft. Previously, Portland acquired 2009 and 2010 second round picks from Chicago in a three-team trade on June 26, 2008.)	United States	PG	Nevada
2011	1	21	Nolan Smith	United States	G	Duke
2011	2	51	Jon Diebler	United States	SG	Ohio State
2012	1	6	Damian Lillard^{Δ} (from Brooklyn) (Note: On March 15, 2012, the Portland Trail Blazers acquired Mehmet Okur, Shawne Williams and a future conditional first round draft pick (the 6th pick) from the New Jersey Nets in exchange for Gerald Wallace.)	United States	PG	Weber St.
2012	1	11	Meyers Leonard	United States	C	Illinois
2012	2	40	Will Barton (from Minnesota via Houston) (Note: On March 15, 2012, the Portland Trail Blazers acquired Jonny Flynn, Hasheem Thabeet, and Minnesota Timberwolves' second round draft pick (the 40th pick) from the Houston Rockets in exchange for Marcus Camby. Previously, on June 24, 2011, the Rockets acquired Jonny Flynn, the draft rights to Donatas Motiejūnas and a future conditional second round draft pick from the Timberwolves in exchange for Brad Miller, the draft rights to Nikola Mirotić, the draft rights to Chandler Parsons, and a future conditional first round draft pick.)	United States	PG	Memphis
2012	2	41	Tyshawn Taylor (traded to Brooklyn) (Note: The Brooklyn Nets acquired the draft rights to 41st pick Tyshawn Taylor from the Blazers in exchange for cash considerations.)	United States	PG	Kansas
2013	1	10	CJ McCollum	United States	PG/SG	Lehigh
2013	2	39	Jeff Withey (from Minnesota via Cleveland and Boston) (Note: On July 20, 2012, the Portland Trail Blazers acquired Sasha Pavlovic, the 39th pick and the 45th pick from the Boston Celtics in a three team sign-and-trade deal involving Courtney Lee. Previously, on February 24, 2011, Boston acquired the 39th pick from the Cleveland Cavaliers in exchange for Semih Erden and Luke Harangody. Previously, on July 27, 2010, Cleveland acquired the 39th pick from the Minnesota Timberwolves along with Ramon Sessions and Ryan Hollins in exchange for Delonte West and Sebastian Telfair.)	United States	C	Kansas
2013	2	40	Grant Jerrett (traded to Oklahoma City) (Note: The Portland Trail Blazers traded 40th pick Grant Jerrett to the Oklahoma City Thunder for cash.)	United States	PF	Arizona
2013	2	45	Marko Todorović (from Boston) (Note: On July 20, 2012, the Portland Trail Blazers acquired Sasha Pavlovic, the 39th pick and the 45th pick from the Boston Celtics in a three team sign-and-trade deal involving Courtney Lee.)	Montenegro	PF/C	FC Barcelona (Spain)
2015	1	23	Rondae Hollis-Jefferson (traded to Brooklyn) (Note: The Brooklyn Nets acquired Steve Blake and draft rights to 23rd pick Rondae Hollis-Jefferson from Portland in exchange for Mason Plumlee and the draft rights to 41st pick Pat Connaughton.)	United States	SF	Arizona
2017	1	15	Justin Jackson (traded to Sacramento) (Note: June 22, 2017: Sacramento Kings to Portland Trail Blazers: Portland acquired Sacramento's first round pick (No. 10); Sacramento acquired Portland's first round picks (No. 15 and No. 20))	United States	SF	North Carolina
2017	1	20	Harry Giles (from Memphis via Denver and Cleveland, (Note: January 22, 2013: Memphis Grizzlies to Cleveland Cavaliers: Memphis acquired Jon Leuer; Cleveland acquired Marreese Speights, Josh Selby, Wayne Ellington, and Memphis' protected future first round pick; the pick could not be conveyed until two years after Memphis sent its first round pick to Minnesota (which happened in 2013) and was protected #1–5 and #15–30 in 2015, then #1–5 in 2017 and 2018; January 7, 2015: Cleveland Cavaliers to Denver Nuggets: Cleveland acquired Timofey Mozgov and the worse of Chicago's and Portland's 2015 second round picks; Denver acquired Oklahoma City's 2015 protected first round pick and Memphis's first round pick (protected through 2018); February 13, 2017: Denver Nuggets to Portland Trail Blazers: Denver acquired Mason Plumlee and a 2018 second round pick; Portland acquired Jusuf Nurkić and Memphis' protected first round pick (protected #1–5 through 2018)) traded to Sacramento)	United States	PF/C	Duke
2017	1	26	Caleb Swanigan (from Cleveland) (Note: February 18, 2016: Cleveland Cavaliers to Portland Trail Blazers: Cleveland acquired a future second round pick (2018); Portland acquired Anderson Varejão and a future first round pick; January 6, 2017: Cleveland Cavaliers to Portland Trail Blazers: Cleveland reacquired its own 2018 first round pick; Portland acquired a first-round pick)	United States	PF	Purdue
2018	1	24	Anfernee Simons	United States	SG	IMG Academy (Bradenton, Florida)
2019	1	25	Nassir Little	United States	SF	North Carolina
2020	1	16	Isaiah Stewart (traded to Detroit via Houston) (Note: November 22, 2020: Portland Trail Blazers to Houston Rockets: Houston acquired Trevor Ariza, the draft rights to Isaiah Stewart, and a future conditional first round pick; Portland acquired Robert Covington; November 24, 2020: Houston Rockets to Detroit Pistons: Detroit acquired Trevor Ariza, the draft rights to Isaiah Stewart, a future second round pick, and cash considerations; Houston acquired Christian Wood, a protected future first round draft pick, and a 2021 second round pick)	United States	PF	Washington
2020	2	46	C. J. Elleby	United States	SG	Washington State
2022	1	7	Shaedon Sharpe	Canada	SG	Kentucky
2022	2	36	Gabriele Procida (traded to Detroit) (Note: July 6, 2022: Portland Trail Blazers to Detroit Pistons: Portland acquired Jerami Grant and the draft rights to Ismaël Kamagate; Detroit acquired the draft rights to Gabriele Procida, a 2025 protected first round pick (from Milwaukee), 2025 and 2026 second round picks)	Italy	SG/SF	Fortitudo Bologna (Italy)
2022	2	57	Jabari Walker (from Memphis via Utah) (Note: August 7, 2021: Memphis Grizzlies to Utah Jazz: Utah acquired the draft rights to Jared Butler, a 2022 second round pick and a 2026 second round pick; Memphis acquired the draft rights to Santi Aldama; February 9, 2022: Utah Jazz to Portland Trail Blazers (three-team trade with San Antonio Spurs): Portland acquired Joe Ingles, Elijah Hughes and a 2022 second-round pick; Utah acquired Nickeil Alexander-Walker and Juancho Hernangómez; San Antonio acquired Tomáš Satoranský and a 2027 second round selection)	United States	PF	Colorado
2023	1	3	Scoot Henderson	United States	PG	G League Ignite (NBA G League)
2023	1	23	Kris Murray (from New York) (Note: February 8, 2023: New York Knicks to Portland Trail Blazers (four-team trade with Philadelphia 76ers and Charlotte Hornets): Portland acquired Cam Reddish, Ryan Arcidiacono, Matisse Thybulle, and New York's lottery-protected 2023 first round pick; New York acquired Josh Hart; Philadelphia acquired Jalen McDaniels, New York's 2024 second round pick, and Portland's 2029 second round pick; Charlotte acquired Svi Mykhailiuk, the most favorable of Atlanta's, Charlotte's, and Brooklyn's 2023 second round picks, and Portland's 2027 second round pick)	United States	PF	Iowa
2023	2	43	Rayan Rupert (from Atlanta) (Note: February 9, 2023: Atlanta Hawks to Portland Trail Blazers (four-team trade with Golden State and Detroit: Portland acquired Kevin Knox II, and 2023, 2024, 2025, 2026, and 2028 second-round picks; Atlanta acquired Saddiq Bey; Golden State acquired Gary Payton II, a 2026 and a 2028 second-round picks; Detroit acquired James Wiseman)	France	SG	New Zealand Breakers (Australia)
2024	1	7	Donovan Clingan	United States	C	UConn
2024	1	14	Bub Carrington (from Golden State via Memphis and Boston, (Note: July 7, 2019: Golden State Warriors to Memphis Grizzlies: Memphis acquired Andre Iguodala, a 2024 first-round pick, and cash considerations; Golden State acquired Julian Washburn; June 23, 2023: Memphis Grizzlies to Boston Celtics (three-team trade with Washington): Boston acquired Kristaps Porziņģis, a 2023 first-round pick, and Golden State's 2024 first-round pick; Memphis acquired Marcus Smart; Washington acquired Tyus Jones, Danilo Gallinari, Mike Muscala, and Boston's 2023 second-round pick; October 1, 2023: Boston Celtics to Portland Trail Blazers: Portland acquired Robert Williams III, Malcolm Brogdon, Golden State's 2024 first-round pick, and a 2029 first-round pick; Boston acquired Jrue Holiday) traded to Washington) (Note: June 26, 2024: Portland Trail Blazers to Washington Wizards: Washington acquired Malcolm Brogdon, the 14th pick in the 2024 draft (Bub Carrington), a 2029 first-round pick, and 2028 and 2030 second-round picks; Portland acquired Deni Avdija)	United States	SG	Pittsburgh
2024	2	34	Tyler Kolek (from Charlotte via New Orleans, Oklahoma City, and Denver), (Note: November 18, 2020: Charlotte Hornets to New Orleans Pelicans: New Orleans acquired a 2024 second-round pick; Charlotte acquired the draft rights to Nick Richards; June 23, 2022: Oklahoma City Thunder to Denver Nuggets: Denver acquired the draft rights to Peyton Watson and two future second-round picks; Oklahoma City acquired JaMychal Green and a 2027 protected first-round draft pick; July 6, 2022: Denver Nuggets to Portland Trail Blazers: Portland acquired a 2024 second-round draft pick; Denver acquired the draft rights to Ismaël Kamagate) traded to New York) (Note: June 27, 2024: Portland Trail Blazers to New York Knicks: New York acquired the draft rights to Tyler Kolek; Portland acquired 2027, 2029, and 2030 second-round picks, and the draft rights to Dani Díez)	United States	PG	Marquette
2024	2	40	Oso Ighodaro (from Atlanta, traded to Phoenix via New York) (Note: June 27, 2024: Portland Trail Blazers to Oklahoma City Thunder to New York Knicks: Portland traded the 40th pick to Oklahoma City in exchange for the 52nd and cash considerations; Oklahoma City traded the pick and cash considerations to New York in exchange for the draft rights to Ajay Mitchell, the 38th pick.; New York Knicks to Phoenix Suns: Phoenix acquired the draft rights to Oso Ighodaro; New York acquired the draft rights to Kevin McCullar Jr. and a future second-round pick)	United States	PF/C	Marquette
2025	1	11	Cedric Coward (traded to Memphis) (Note: June 25, 2025: Memphis Grizzlies to Portland Trail Blazers: Portland acquired Memphis's first-round pick (No. 16, Yang Hansen), a 2028 first-round pick (via Orlando), a 2027 second-round pick (via Atlanta), and a 2028 second-round pick (via Sacramento); Memphis acquired Portland's first-round pick (No. 11, Cedric Coward))	United States	SF	Washington State
