= Troy Brewer =

American professional basketball player

Free agent
- Position: Guard

Personal information
- Born: January 29, 1989 (age 37)
- Listed height: 6 ft 5 in (1.96 m)
- Listed weight: 180 lb (82 kg)

Career information
- High school: Montrose Christian (Rockville, Maryland)
- College: Georgia (2007–2009); American (2010–2012)
- NBA draft: 2012: undrafted
- Playing career: 2013–present

Career history
- 2013–2014: Værløse Basket (Denmark)
- 2014–2015: Moncton Miracles (Canada)

Troy Sharmir Brewer (born January 29, 1989) is an American professional basketball player who last played for the Moncton Miracles of the National Basketball League of Canada. He played college basketball for the University of Georgia and American University.

== High school and college career ==
As a senior at Montrose Christian School, Brewer earned first-team All-Gazette honors after averaging 14.7 points per game. In 2010–11, as a junior at American, Brewer averaged 11.5 points, 4.0 rebounds, and 1.3 assists per game. In 2011–12, as a senior, Brewer averaged 11.9 points, 3.4 rebounds, and 1.5 assists per game.

== Professional career ==
On August 21, 2012, Brewer signed with Naturtex SZTE-Szedeák of Hungary for the 2012–13 season. However, he later parted ways with the team prior to the start of the regular season.

On May 14, 2013, Brewer signed with Værløse of Denmark for the 2013–14 season. In 19 games for Værløse, he averaged 16.6 points, 3.1 rebounds, 1.7 assists and 1.2 steals per game.

Brewer moved to Canada for the 2014–15 season, signing with the Moncton Miracles of the National Basketball League of Canada. In 30 games for Moncton, he averaged 11.0 points, 2.2 rebounds and 1.7 assists per game.

On November 2, 2015, Brewer was acquired by the Westchester Knicks after a successful tryout. However, he was waived by the Knicks five days later.

== Personal life ==
The son of Sandra and Tony Brewer, who played basketball at Tennessee State. He has one sister, Tonia. Brewer majored in business administration.
