= Cornell Big Red men's basketball statistical leaders =

Cornell basketball team statistics

The Cornell Big Red men's basketball statistical leaders are individual statistical leaders of the Cornell Big Red basketball program in various categories, including points, rebounds, assists, steals, and blocks. Within those areas, the lists identify single-game, single-season, and career leaders. The Big Red represent Cornell University in the NCAA's Ivy League.

Cornell began competing in intercollegiate basketball in 1898. However, the school's record book does not generally list records from before the 1950s, as records from before this period are often incomplete and inconsistent. Since scoring was much lower in this era, and teams played much fewer games during a typical season, it is likely that few or no players from this era would appear on these lists anyway.

The NCAA did not officially record assists as a stat until the 1983–84 season, and blocks and steals until the 1985–86 season, but Cornell's record books includes players in these stats before these seasons. These lists are updated through the end of the 2019–20 season.

== Scoring ==
Career
Rk	Player	Points	Seasons
1	Matt Morgan	2,333	2015–16 2016–17 2017–18 2018–19
2	Ryan Wittman	2,028	2006–07 2007–08 2008–09 2009–10
3	John Bajusz	1,663	1983–84 1984–85 1985–86 1986–87
4	Louis Dale	1,452	2006–07 2007–08 2008–09 2009–10
5	Ray Mercedes	1,429	1997–98 1998–99 1999–00 2000–01
6	Ken Bantum	1,411	1981–82 1982–83 1983–84 1984–85
7	Mike Davis	1,400	1977–78 1978–79 1979–80
8	Ka’Ron Barnes	1,396	2000–01 2001–02 2002–03 2003–04
9	Shawn Maharaj	1,258	1988–89 1989–90 1990–91 1991–92
10	Chuck Rolles	1,253	1953–54 1954–55 1955–56

Season
Rk	Player	Points	Season
1	Matt Morgan	687	2018–19
2	Matt Morgan	630	2017–18
3	Ryan Wittman	596	2009–10
4	Ryan Wittman	572	2008–09
5	Mike Davis	557	1977–78
6	Chuck Rolles	553	1955–56
7	Ka’Ron Barnes	544	2003–04
8	Matt Morgan	510	2015–16
	Cooper Noard	510	2025–26
10	Matt Morgan	506	2016–17

Single game
Rk	Player	Points	Season	Opponent
1	George Farley	47	1959–60	Princeton
2	Chuck Rolles	42	1955–56	Syracuse
3	Matt Morgan	41	2018–19	Dartmouth
4	Stone Gettings	39	2017–18	Delaware
5	Alex Compton	38	1995–96	Yale
	Matt Morgan	38	2018–19	Binghamton
	Matt Morgan	38	2018–19	Towson
8	Hillary Chollet	37	1948–49	Syracuse
	Chuck Rolles	37	1955–56	Brown
	Louis Jordan	37	1956–57	Penn
	Greggory Morris	37	1966–67	Rochester
	Greggory Morris	37	1966–67	Kentucky
	Bernard Vaughan	37	1975–76	Rochester
	Maynard Brown	37	1974–75	Yale
	Ray Mercedes	37	2000–01	Harvard

== Rebounds ==
Career
Rk	Player	Rebounds	Seasons
1	George Farley	1,089	1957–58 1958–59 1959–60
2	John Sheehy	866	1952–53 1953–54 1954–55
3	Walt Esdaile	840	1966–67 1967–68 1968–69
4	Bill Schwarzkopf	762	1967–68 1968–69 1969–70
5	Steve Cram	735	1963–64 1964–65 1965–66
6	Fred Eydt	730	1949–50 1950–51 1951–52
7	Bill Baugh	695	1959–60 1960–61 1961–62
8	Garry Munson	645	1963–64 1964–65 1965–66
9	David Zornow	644	1957–58 1958–59 1959–60
10	Eric Taylor	643	2001–02 2002–03 2003–04 2004–05

Season
Rk	Player	Rebounds	Season
1	George Farley	466	1959–60
2	Bo Roberson	423	1955–56
3	George Farley	405	1958–59
4	John Sheehy	383	1954–55
5	Fred Eydt	372	1950–51
6	Fred Eydt	358	1951–52
7	Walt Esdaile	315	1966–67
8	Bill Schwarzkopf	307	1969–70
9	Gerald Krumbein	305	1961–62
10	Walt Esdaile	294	1967–68

Single game
Rk	Player	Rebounds	Season	Opponent
1	Bo Roberson	27	1955–56	Colgate
2	George Farley	26	1959–60	Brown
3	Justin Treadwell	20	1993–94	Hofstra
	John McCord	20	1996–97	Penn
5	Bernard Jackson	19	1988–89	Dartmouth
6	Brian Hather	18	1973–74	Villanova
	Maynard Brown	18	1974–75	Yale
	Bernard Jackson	18	1990–91	Brown
	Jeff Foote	18	2009–10	Bucknell
10	Greg Barratt	17	1999–00	Norfolk State
	Stone Gettings	17	2017–18	Penn
	Jimmy Boeheim	17	2019–20	Coppin State

== Assists ==
Career
Rk	Player	Assists	Seasons
1	Chris Wroblewski	482	2008–09 2009–10 2010–11 2011–12
2	Louis Dale	470	2006–07 2007–08 2008–09 2009–10
3	Chuck Rolles	378	1953–54 1954–55 1955–56
4	Josh Wexler	377	1985–86 1986–87 1987–88 1988–89
5	Roger Chadwick	341	1949–50 1950–51 1951–52
6	Ka’Ron Barnes	327	2000–01 2001–02 2002–03 2003–04
7	DeShawn Standard	320	1994–95 1995–96 1996–97 1997–98
8	Nazir Williams	308	2021–22 2022–23 2023–24 2024–25
9	Matt Morgan	296	2015–16 2016–17 2017–18 2018–19
10	Wallace Prather	290	1998–99 1999–00 2000–01 2001–02

Season
Rk	Player	Assists	Season
1	Roger Chadwick	171	1951–52
2	Roger Chadwick	170	1950–51
3	David Bradfield	150	1953–54
4	Chris Wroblewski	149	2010–11
5	Chris Wroblewski	147	2011–12
6	Louis Dale	146	2009–10
7	Richard Meade	141	1954–55
8	Hawathia Wilson	139	1982–83
9	Louis Dale	138	2007–08
10	Chuck Rolles	136	1955–56

Single game
Rk	Player	Assists	Season	Opponent
1	Ka’Ron Barnes	13	2002–03	Lafayette
2	Chris Wroblewski	12	2010–11	Wofford
	Nazir Williams	12	2024–25	Princeton
4	Mike Allen	11	1980–81	Niagara
	Josh Wexler	11	1985–86	Niagara
	Josh Wexler	11	1987–88	Penn
	Chris Wroblewski	11	2010–11	Penn
	Robert Hatter	11	2015–16	Binghamton
9	Charlie Davis	10	1975–76	Niagara
	Bernard Vaughan	10	1976–77	Yale
	Mike Allen	10	1979–80	Rochester
	Hawathia Wilson	10	1982–83	Niagara
	Hawathia Wilson	10	1982–83	Yale
	Kevin Cuttica	10	1997–98	Grambling
	Ka’Ron Barnes	10	2003–04	Vermont
	Graham Dow	10	2006–07	Hartford
	Louis Dale	10	2007–08	Lehigh
	Chris Wroblewski	10	2011–12	Yale
	Devin Cherry	10	2013–14	Brown
	Greg Dolan	10	2022–23	Syracuse

== Steals ==
Career
Rk	Player	Steals	Seasons
1	Wallace Prather	197	1998–99 1999–00 2000–01 2001–02
2	Chris Manon	173	2021–22 2022–23 2023–24
3	Graham Dow	166	2003–04 2004–05 2005–06 2006–07
4	DeShawn Standard	155	1994–95 1995–96 1996–97 1997–98
5	John Bajusz	150	1983–84 1984–85 1985–86 1986–87
6	Ka’Ron Barnes	149	2000–01 2001–02 2002–03 2003–04
	Lenny Collins	149	2002–03 2003–04 2004–05 2005–06
8	Zeke Marshall	144	1990–91 1991–92 1992–93 1993–94
	Drew Martin	144	1982–83 1983–84 1984–85 1985–86
10	Chris Wroblewski	139	2008–09 2009–10 2010–11 2011–12

Season
Rk	Player	Steals	Season
1	Chris Manon	63	2022–23
	Chris Manon	63	2023–24
3	DeShawn Standard	54	1997–98
	Wallace Prather	54	2001–02
5	Shonn Miller	52	2012–13
6	Michael Parker	51	1992–93
	Wallace Prather	51	1999–00
	Zeke Marshall	51	1992–93
	Ka’Ron Barnes	51	2003–04
10	Wallace Prather	49	1998–99
	Drew Martin	49	1985–86
	Graham Dow	49	2005–06

Single game
Rk	Player	Steals	Season	Opponent
1	Lenny Collins	8	2003–04	Bucknell
2	Frank Ableson	7	1993–94	Columbia
	DeShawn Standard	7	1997–98	Lehigh
	Chris Manon	7	2022–23	Binghamton
5	George Hall	6	1981–82	Niagara
	Steve Johnson	6	1990–91	Army
	Zeke Marshall	6	1992–93	Princeton
	Zeke Marshall	6	1993–94	Columbia
	Lenny Collins	6	2003–04	Colgate
	Lenny Collins	6	2003–04	Harvard
	Ryan Wittman	6	2009–10	Penn

== Blocks ==
Career
Rk	Player	Blocks	Seasons
1	Jeffrion Aubry	191	1995–96 1996–97 1997–98 1998–99
2	Bernard Jackson	174	1987–88 1988–89 1989–90 1990–91
3	Jeff Foote	159	2007–08 2008–09 2009–10
4	Shonn Miller	154	2011–12 2012–13 2014–15
5	Andrew Naeve	141	2003–04 2004–05 2005–06 2006–07
6	David Onuorah	119	2013–14 2014–15 2015–16 2016–17
7	Ken Bantum	97	1981–82 1982–83 1983–84 1984–85
8	Steven Julian	87	2017–18 2018–19
9	Eric Taylor	85	2001–02 2002–03 2003–04 2004–05
10	Alex Tyler	66	2006–07 2007–08 2008–09 2009–10

Season
Rk	Player	Blocks	Season
1	Bernard Jackson	65	1989–90
	Jeff Foote	65	2009–10
3	Jeff Foote	64	2008–09
4	Jeffrion Aubry	63	1998–99
5	Bernard Jackson	56	1988–89
6	Shonn Miller	55	2014–15
7	Jeffrion Aubry	53	1996–97
	Jeffrion Aubry	53	1997–98
	Bernard Jackson	53	1990–91
	Andrew Naeve	53	2006–07

Single game
Rk	Player	Blocks	Season	Opponent
1	Mike Shaffer	10	1978–79	Niagara
2	Bernard Jackson	8	1989–90	Yale
3	Jeffrion Aubry	7	1996–97	Haverford
	Chris Vandenberg	7	2001–02	Canisius
	Jeff Foote	7	2008–09	Loyola (MD)
	Shonn Miller	7	2012–13	Dartmouth
	David Onuorah	7	2014–15	Brown
8	Mike Shaffer	6	1977–78	Loyola (IL)
	Paul Sellew	6	1979–80	Columbia
	Jeffrion Aubry	6	1997–98	Columbia
	Bernard Jackson	6	1988–89	Binghamton
	Bernard Jackson	6	1990–91	Colgate
	Bernard Jackson	6	1990–91	Columbia
	Bernard Jackson	6	1990–91	Brown
	Jeff Foote	6	2009–10	Dartmouth
	Shonn Miller	6	2012–13	Western Michigan
