= 2009–10 Ivy League men's basketball season =

- League: NCAA Division I
- Sport: Basketball
- Duration: January 9, 2010 through March 9, 2010
- Teams: 8

Regular Season
- League champions: Cornell
- Season MVP: Ryan Wittman, Cornell

Basketball seasons
- 2008–09 2010–11

2009–10 Ivy League men's basketball standings
	Conf.				Overall
Team	W		L	PCT	W		L	PCT
Cornell	13	–	1	.929	29	–	5	.853
Princeton	11	–	3	.786	22	–	9	.710
Harvard	10	–	4	.714	21	–	9	.700
Yale	6	–	8	.429	12	–	19	.387
Columbia	5	–	9	.357	11	–	17	.393
Brown	5	–	9	.357	11	–	20	.355
Penn	5	–	9	.357	6	–	22	.214
Dartmouth	1	–	13	.071	5	–	23	.179
As of March 21, 2010; Rankings from AP Poll

The 2009–10 Ivy League men's basketball season was the 56th season of Ivy League basketball. The Cornell University Big Red won their third consecutive Ivy League Championship and were the league's representative at the 2010 NCAA Division I men's basketball tournament. Seeded 12th in the East Region the Big Red won their first two games over number five seed Temple University 78-65 and number four seed University of Wisconsin 87-69 before falling to number one seed University of Kentucky 62-45 in the Sweet Sixteen. They were the first Ivy League team to reach the Sweet Sixteen since the 1978–79 Penn Quakers and set an Ivy League record with 29 wins.

== Preseason ==
The Ivy League held its pre-season media day on October 28, 2009 in Princeton, New Jersey. The league's media unanimously voted Cornell the preseason #1 for the second straight season. Cornell returned all five starters, three all-conference performers, and the Ivy League rookie and defensive players of the year from the 2009 Ivy League championship team.

Two Ivy League seniors were named preseason candidates for the Lowe's Senior CLASS Award. Columbia's Patrick Foley and Brown's Matthew Mullery were named to the 30-man preseason list.

=== Ivy League Media Poll ===
Rank	Team	Votes
1	Cornell (16)	128
2	Princeton	96
3	Penn	92
4	Harvard	86
5	Yale	59
6	Columbia	55
7	Brown	41
8	Dartmouth	19

== Regular season ==
=== Non-conference ===
Preseason #1 Cornell lived up to its billing by scoring the first Ivy League win over one of the six major conferences as the Big Red beat the SEC's Alabama Crimson Tide 71–67 in Tuscaloosa, Alabama, behind Ryan Wittman's 23 points. It was Cornell's first win over a current SEC member school since the Big Red defeated Arkansas (then a part of the Southwest Conference) during the 1972–73 season.

Harvard also got off to a fast start. After winning their opener against Holy Cross, the Crimson won a triple-overtime contest over the College of William & Mary, 87–85 on a half-court shot by senior guard Jeremy Lin. Lin also made headlines in early December as he scored 30 points in a close loss (79–73) at #14 Connecticut, then came back to score 25 in the Crimson's very next game – a 74–67 upset of Boston College. Lin started the New Year by being named to the Mid-season Wooden Award 30-man watch list and the Bob Cousy Award.

The Ivy made news for some not-so positive reasons as the conference saw two coaches fired during the pre-conference slate. Penn fired coach Glen Miller after an 0–7 start, while Dartmouth's Terry Dunn resigned after a 3–10 start.

But the biggest press of the non-conference season for the Ivy League came on January 6, as league favorite Cornell led #1 and undefeated Kansas with under a minute remaining at Allen Fieldhouse. Ultimately, the Big Red lost to KU 71–66, but the Ivy stalwarts proved that they could compete with the top teams

=== Conference season ===
Cornell and Harvard were expected to compete for the league title, but the Big Red swept the Crimson. However, Penn stopped Cornell's bid for a perfect Ivy League season by beating the then 22nd ranked Big Red 79–64 at the Palestra in Philadelphia. The win snapped an eight-game win streak by Cornell.

== Conference awards & honors ==
=== All-Conference teams ===
At the conclusion of the season, the Ivy League all-conference teams were selected. Cornell placed a trio of seniors – Ryan Wittman, Jeff Foote and Louis Dale – on the All-Ivy first team. The Big Red threesome were joined on the first team by Harvard's Jeremy Lin and Penn's Zack Rosen. Wittman and Foote were the Ivy League player and defensive players of the year, respectively.

- Player of the Year: Ryan Wittman, Cornell (unanimous)
- Rookie of the Year: Kyle Casey, Harvard
- Defensive Player of the Year: Jeff Foote, Cornell

All-Ivy League first team

- Louis Dale, Cornell
- Jeff Foote, Cornell (unanimous)
- Ryan Wittman, Cornell (unanimous)
- Jeremy Lin, Harvard (unanimous)
- Zack Rosen, Penn (unanimous)

All-Ivy League second team

- Matt Mullery, Brown
- Noruwa Agho, Columbia
- Jack Eggleston, Penn
- Douglas Davis, Princeton
- Dan Mavraides, Princeton
- Alex Zampier, Yale

All-Ivy League honorable mention

- Chris Wroblewski, Cornell
- Kyle Casey, Harvard
- Michael Sands, Yale

=== Weekly awards ===
Ivy League Players of the Week
Throughout the conference season, the Ivy League offices name a player and rookie of the week.

Week	Player of the week	Rookie of the week
November 16	Jeremy Lin, G, Harvard	Dee Giger, G, Harvard
November 16	Ryan Wittman, F, Cornell	Dee Giger, G, Harvard
November 23	Noruwa Agho, G, Columbia	Andrew McCarthy, F, Brown
November 23	Matt Mullery, C, Brown	Andrew McCarthy, F, Brown
November 30	Noruwa Agho, G, Columbia	Matt Sullivan, G, Brown
November 30	Ryan Wittman, F, Cornell	Matt Sullivan, G, Brown
December 7	Jeremy Lin, G, Harvard	Errick Peck, F, Cornell
December 14	Noruwa Agho, G, Columbia	Ian Hummer, F, Princeton
December 14	Jeremy Lin, G, Harvard	Ian Hummer, F, Princeton
December 21	Ryan Wittman, F, Cornell	Matt LaBove, C, Dartmouth
December 28	Jeff Foote, C, Cornell	Mark Cisco, C, Columbia
December 28	Alex Zampier, G, Yale	Mark Cisco, C, Columbia
January 4	Ryan Wittman, F, Cornell	Kyle Casey, F, Harvard
January 11	Ryan Wittman, F, Cornell	Tucker Halpern, F, Brown
January 18	Jeff Foote, C, Cornell	Andrew McCarthy, F, Brown
January 25	Alex Zampier, G, Yale	Kyle Casey, F, Harvard
February 1	Douglas Davis, G, Princeton	Ian Hummer, F, Princeton
February 8	Jeff Foote, C, Cornell	Kyle Casey, F, Harvard
February 15	Kyle Casey, F, Harvard	Kyle Casey, F, Harvard
February 22	Ryan Wittman, F, Cornell	Tucker Halpern, F, Brown
March 1	Jeremy Lin, G, Harvard	Brandyn Curry, G, Harvard
March 8	Louis Dale, G, Cornell	Brandyn Curry, G, Harvard
