= 2008–09 Cornell Big Red men's basketball team =

American college basketball season

2008–09 Cornell Big Red men's basketball

Ivy League Champions

NCAA tournament, First Round
- Conference: Ivy League
- Record: 21–10 (11–3 Ivy)
- Head coach: Steve Donahue (9th season)
- Assistant coaches: Nat Graham; Woody Kampmann; Kevin App
- Home arena: Newman Arena

2008–09 Ivy League men's basketball standings
	Conf.				Overall
Team	W		L	PCT	W		L	PCT
Cornell	11	–	3	.786	21	–	10	.677
Princeton	8	–	6	.571	13	–	14	.481
Yale	8	–	6	.571	13	–	15	.464
Columbia	7	–	7	.500	12	–	16	.429
Dartmouth	7	–	7	.500	9	–	19	.321
Harvard	6	–	8	.429	14	–	14	.500
Penn	6	–	8	.429	10	–	18	.357
Brown	3	–	11	.214	9	–	19	.321
Rankings from AP Poll

The 2008–09 Cornell Big Red men's basketball team represented Cornell University in the 2008–09 college basketball season. This was coach Steve Donahue's 8th season at Cornell. The Big Red compete in the Ivy League and played their home games at Newman Arena. They went 11–3 in Ivy League play to win the championship and received the league's automatic bid to the 2009 NCAA Division I men's basketball tournament. They received a 14 seed in the West region. They were beaten by No. 3 seed Missouri in the first round to finish their season at 21–10.

== Roster ==
2008–09 Cornell Big Red men's basketball team
Players
Coaches

Pos.	#	Name	Height	Weight	Year	Hometown
C	1	Jeff Foote	7 ft 0 in (2.13 m)	265 lb (120 kg)	Sr	Lockwood, New York
G	3	Chris Wroblewski	6 ft 0 in (1.83 m)	180 lb (82 kg)	Fr	Highland Park, Illinois
G	12	Louis Dale	5 ft 11 in (1.8 m)	180 lb (82 kg)	Jr	Birmingham, Alabama
F	20	Ryan Wittman	6 ft 6 in (1.98 m)	215 lb (98 kg)	Jr	Eden Prairie, Minnesota
G	23	Adam Gore	6 ft 0 in (1.83 m)	180 lb (82 kg)	Sr	Monrovia, Indiana
F	25	Jon Jaques	6 ft 7 in (2.01 m)	220 lb (100 kg)	Jr	Los Angeles, California

Head coach

- Steve Donahue (Ursinus)

Assistant coach(es)

Legend

- (C) Team captain
- (S) Suspended
- (I) Ineligible
- (W) Walk-on
- Injured
- Current redshirt

Roster

== Schedule and results ==
- All times are Eastern

Date time, TV	Rank^{#}	Opponent^{#}	Result	Record	Site (attendance) city, state
Non-conference regular season
Nov 14, 2008*		South Dakota	W 79–69	1–0	Newman Arena (3,679); Ithaca, New York
Nov 17, 2008*		vs. St. John's	L 75–86	1–1	Silvio O. Conte Forum (4,283); Boston, Massachusetts
Nov 18, 2008*		vs. Loyola (MD)	W 82–72	2–1	Silvio O. Conte Forum (865); Boston, Massachusetts
Nov 22, 2008*		at Siena	L 56–74	2–2	Times Union Center (7,575); Albany, New York
Nov 24, 2008*		Loyola (IL)	W 78–53	3–2	Carnesecca Arena (893); Queens, New York
Nov 25, 2008*		vs. Eastern Michigan	W 67–54	4–2	Carnesecca Arena (959); Queens, New York
Nov 30, 2008*		at Indiana	L 57–72	4–3	Assembly Hall (13,325); Bloomington, Indiana
Dec 3, 2008*		at No. 16 Syracuse	L 78–88	4–4	Carrier Dome (18,859); Syracuse, New York
Dec 6, 2008*		at Minnesota	L 54–71	4–5	Williams Arena (12,615); Minneapolis, Minnesota
Dec 20, 2008*		La Salle	W 79–70	5–5	Newman Arena (1,522); Ithaca, New York
Dec 22, 2008*		at Saint Joseph's	L 67–71	5–6	The Palestra (6,177); Philadelphia, Pennsylvania
Dec 29, 2008*		Boston University	W 89–59	6–6	Newman Arena (2,358); Ithaca, New York
Dec 31, 2008*		Quinnipiac	W 73–70	7–6	Newman Arena (1,014); Ithaca, New York
Jan 3, 2009		Ursinus	W 99–45	8–6 (2–0)	Newman Arena (1,936); Ithaca, New York
Jan 6, 2009*		Bucknell	W 75–64	9–6	Newman Arena (1,143); Ithaca, New York
Jan 12, 2009*		at Bryant	W 69–46	10–6	Chace Athletic Center (387); Smithfield, Rhode Island
Ivy League Regular Season
Jan 17, 2009		at Columbia	W 71–59	11–6 (1–0)	Levien Gymnasium (1,655); New York, New York
Jan 24, 2009		Columbia	W 83–72	12–6 (2–0)	Newman Arena (3,469); Ithaca, New York
Jan 30, 2009		Brown	W 90–58	13–6 (3–0)	Newman Arena (3,213); Ithaca, New York
Jan 31, 2009		Yale	W 64–36	14–6 (4–0)	Newman Arena (3,418); Ithaca, New York
Feb 6, 2009		at Princeton	L 41–61	14–7 (4–1)	Jadwin Gymnasium (2,413); Princeton, New Jersey
Feb 7, 2009		at Penn	W 88–73	15–7 (5–1)	Palestra (4,825); Philadelphia, Pennsylvania
Feb 13, 2009		Harvard	W 96–75	16–7 (6–1)	Newman Arena (3,438); Ithaca, New York
Feb 14, 2009		Dartmouth	W 79–76 ^{2OT}	17–7 (7–1)	Newman Arena (4,123); Ithaca, New York
Feb 20, 2009		at Yale	L 60–72	17–8 (7–2)	Payne Whitney Gymnasium (1,905); New Haven, Connecticut
Feb 21, 2009		at Brown	W 85–45	18–8 (8–2)	Pizzitola Sports Center (887); Providence, Rhode Island
Feb 27, 2009		at Dartmouth	W 75–57	19–8 (9–2)	Leede Arena (1,572); Hanover, New Hampshire
Feb 28, 2009		at Harvard	L 70–71	19–9 (9–3)	Lavietes Pavilion (1,971); Cambridge, Massachusetts
Mar 6, 2009		Penn	W 83–58	20–9 (10–3)	Newman Arena (4,093); Ithaca, New York
Mar 7, 2009		Princeton	W 60–51	21–9 (11–3)	Newman Arena (4,211); Ithaca, New York
NCAA tournament
Mar 20, 2009*	(14 W)	vs. (3 W) No. 9 Missouri; First Round	L 59–78	21–10	Taco Bell Arena (11,997); Boise, Idaho
*Non-conference game. ^{#}Rankings from AP Poll. (#) Tournament seedings in parentheses. W=West.
