= 2010–11 Princeton Tigers men's basketball team =

American college basketball season

2010–11 Princeton Tigers men's basketball

Ivy League Co-Champion

2011 NCAA tournament, Round of 64
- Conference: Ivy League
- Record: 25–7 (12–2, 1st-T Ivy)
- Head coach: Sydney Johnson (4th year)
- Captains: Kareem Maddox; Dan Mavraides; Patrick Saunders
- Home arena: Jadwin Gymnasium

2010–11 Ivy League men's basketball standings
	Conf.				Overall
Team	W		L	PCT	W		L	PCT
Princeton	12	–	2	.857	25	–	7	.781
Harvard	12	–	2	.857	23	–	7	.767
Yale	8	–	6	.571	15	–	13	.536
Penn	7	–	7	.500	13	–	15	.464
Columbia	6	–	8	.429	15	–	13	.536
Cornell	6	–	8	.429	10	–	18	.357
Brown	4	–	10	.286	11	–	17	.393
Dartmouth	1	–	13	.071	5	–	23	.179
As of March 17, 2011; Rankings from AP Poll

The 2010–11 Princeton Tigers men's basketball team represented Princeton University in intercollegiate college basketball during the 2010–11 NCAA Division I men's basketball season. The head coach was Sydney Johnson, who was in his fourth season. The team's tri-captains were senior Kareem Maddox, senior Dan Mavraides, and junior Patrick Saunders. The team played its home games in the Jadwin Gymnasium on the University campus in Princeton, New Jersey. The team competes in the Ivy League athletic conference. The team was coming off of a 22–9 2009–10 season in which it achieved the most wins by a Tigers men's basketball team since the 1998–99 team and its first back-to-back finishes of at least second place in the Ivy since 2001–02 season. The team was also following on the heels of its first postseason appearance since the 2003–04 team went to the 2004 NCAA Division I men's basketball tournament, and its first postseason victory since the 1998–99 team won two games in the 1999 National Invitation Tournament.

The team was led by returning second team All-Ivy League selections junior Douglas Davis and senior Dan Mavraides. This was the first team to have two returning first or second All-Ivy players since the 2003–04 team returned Will Venable and Judson Wallace. The team was attempting to defend its scoring defense statistical championship, which it won for the twentieth time since 1976 in 2010. Following the season, seniors Mavraides (2nd team) and Maddox (1st team, unanimous) earned All-Ivy recognition. They were joined by sophomore Ian Hummer (2nd team). Maddox earned conference Defensive Player of the Year.

After the annual 14-game round robin home and away schedule, Harvard and Princeton tied as co-champion, resulting in a one-game playoff to determine the league's automatic bid to the 2011 NCAA Division I men's basketball tournament. The Tigers prevailed. Princeton then lost its round of 64 NCAA contest against Kentucky. The season marked the team's 26th Ivy League championship and 24th invitation to the NCAA Men's Division I Basketball Championship.

== Preview ==
Princeton entered the season having not won a championship since the 2003–04 Princeton Tigers men's basketball team achieved the feat and went to the 2004 NCAA Division I men's basketball tournament. The six-season championshipless spell tied a school record and put the team on the verge of establishing a new one should the season not be successful. The team entered the season with its top five scorers from the prior season returning. The team's schedule included the 2010 NCAA Division I men's basketball tournament champion Duke as well as Tournament participant Siena who were the 2010 Metro Atlantic Athletic Conference champions (both regular season and tournament).

Most preseason publications predicted Princeton would finish in first place and Harvard would finish in second place, although the Sporting News projected that Cornell would finish in first followed by Princeton and Harvard. Breaking a three-year streak by Cornell, the Ivy League media poll selected Princeton as the top team with twelve first place votes, Harvard second with four first place votes and Cornell third with one first place vote. It was the first Princeton team to be the preseason top-ranked media selection since the 2004–05 Princeton team.

== Playing style ==
Head coach Johnson employs the Princeton offense. However, in 2010, Johnson tweaked it to be a slightly more uptempo version of the motion offense, which resulted in the highest scoring Princeton team in decades. The offense was still considered slow compared to most schools.

== Schedule ==
The team lost to its only two ranked opponents (#1 Duke and #21 University of Central Florida), but defeated Siena in overtime. The team also defeated power conference opponents Tulsa of Conference USA, Saint Joseph's of the Atlantic 10 Conference and Rutgers of the Big East Conference. Princeton recorded its 11th and the Ivy League's 30th perfect conference record at the halfway point of the 14-game conference schedule. The team posted a perfect 12–0 home record. It was the team's sixth perfect home season in 42 full seasons at Jadwin gymnasium. In 2009, the team adopted 11-year-old Christian Michael "Crunch" Regulski, a pediatric brain tumor patient, as part of the Friends of Jaclyn program. In early February, Crunch, who had previously sat on the team's bench, lost his cancer struggle. During the season, Princeton swept defending Ivy League champion Cornell.

Mavraides scored 25 including 5 three-point shots, but Princeton lost to Harvard at Lavietes Pavilion on March 5 and giving them a split of the season series. Princeton fell a half game behind Harvard who clinched at least a share of the 2010–11 Ivy League men's basketball season Championship with a 12–2 conference record. Princeton fell to 11–2 with one conference game remaining to force a one-game playoff for the conferences automatic bid to the 2011 NCAA Division I men's basketball tournament. Following the game, Sydney Johnson made his team sit on the bench and watch the Harvard fans celebrate. On March 8, Princeton defeated Penn to force a one-game playoff at the Payne Whitney Gymnasium at Yale University in New Haven, Connecticut. Maddox scored 21 of his 23 points from off the bench in the second half to key the victory.

The one-game playoff is the eighth in Ivy League history and the eighth for Princeton, who has won at least a share of twenty-six league titles. The share of the championship ended a six-season championshipless run, which tied a record for the longest in school history. In the one-game playoff, Harvard took 58–57 lead with 2:33 remaining and then the teams traded one-point leads 5 times. Princeton won by a 63–62 margin thanks to a last second shot by Davis to earn its 24th NCAA Division I men's basketball tournament bid. Although Princeton did not appear in the 2010–11 NCAA Division I men's basketball rankings all season, in the final regular season poll on March 13, Princeton received 3 points in the Coaches' Poll.

Princeton was awarded the number thirteen seed and a first round match against the Kentucky Wildcats. Kentucky had eliminated Ivy League representative Cornell the prior season. Kentucky emerged victorious by a 59–57 margin on a last second layup.

Date time, TV	Rank^{#}	Opponent^{#}	Result	Record	Site (attendance) city, state
Regular season
November 12, 2010*; 7:00 pm		Rutgers	W 78–73 ^{OT}	1–0	Jadwin Gymnasium (3,530); Princeton, NJ
November 14, 2010*; 5:00 pm, ESPNU		at No. 1 Duke; CBE Classic	L 60–97	1–1	Cameron Indoor Stadium (9,314); Durham, NC
November 22, 2010*; 7:00 pm		at James Madison; CBE Classic	L 64–65	1–2	JMU Convocation Center (3,113); Harrisonburg, VA
November 23, 2010*; 4:30 pm		vs. Bucknell; CBE Classic	W 66–55	2–2	JMU Convocation Center; Harrisonburg, VA
November 24, 2010*; 4:30 pm		vs. Presbyterian; CBE Classic	L 67–69	2–3	JMU Convocation Center; Harrisonburg, VA
November 28, 2010*; 2:00 pm		Siena	W 86–77 ^{OT}	3–3	Jadwin Gymnasium (1,906); Princeton, NJ
November 30, 2010*; 7:00 pm, LFSN		at Lafayette	W 82–64	4–3	Allan P. Kirby Arena (1,559); Easton, PA
December 5, 2010*; 5:30 pm		Saint Joseph's	W 74–65	5–3	Jadwin Gymnasium (2,010); Princeton, NJ
December 8, 2010*; 7:00 pm		at Monmouth	W 64–61	6–3	Multipurpose Activity Center (1,287); West Long Branch, NJ
December 12, 2010*; 2:00 pm		at Tulsa	W 82–78 ^{2OT}	7–3	Reynolds Center (4,855); Tulsa, OK
December 17, 2010*; 7:00 pm, TWCSN		at Wagner	W 69–57	8–3	Spiro Sports Center (1,027); Staten Island, NY
December 22, 2010*; 4:00 pm		at Towson	W 75–65	9–3	Towson Center (1,891); Towson, MD
December 29, 2010*; 9:30 pm		vs. Northeastern; UCF Holiday Classic	W 65–63	10–3	UCF Arena (7,111); Orlando, FL
December 30, 2010*; 7:30 pm		at No. 19 UCF; UCF Holiday Classic	L 62–68	10–4	UCF Arena (5,591); Orlando, FL
January 5, 2011*; 7:00 pm		Marist	W 68–57	11–4	Jadwin Gymnasium (1,539); Princeton, NJ
January 23, 2011*; 6:00 pm		TCNJ	W 73–40	12–4	Jadwin Gymnasium (1,837); Princeton, NJ
January 28, 2011; 7:00 pm, FiOS1		Brown	W 78–60	13–4 (1–0)	Jadwin Gymnasium (2,330); Princeton, NJ
January 29, 2011; 6:00 pm		Yale	W 67–63	14–4 (2–0)	Jadwin Gymnasium (2,658); Princeton, NJ
February 4, 2011; 7:00 pm, ESPNU		Harvard	W 65–61	15–4 (3–0)	Jadwin Gymnasium (4,148); Princeton, NJ
February 5, 2011; 6:00 pm		Dartmouth	W 68–53	16–4 (4–0)	Jadwin Gymnasium (3,346); Princeton, NJ
February 8, 2011; 7:00 pm, FiOS1/TCN		Penn; Penn–Princeton Rivalry	W 62–59 ^{OT}	17–4 (5–0)	Jadwin Gymnasium (3,840); Princeton, NJ
February 11, 2011; 7:00 pm		at Columbia	W 76–46	18–4 (6–0)	Levien Gymnasium (1,953); New York, NY
February 12, 2011; 7:00 pm		at Cornell	W 57–55	19–4 (7–0)	Newman Arena (4,087); Ithaca, NY
February 18, 2011; 7:00 pm, YES		at Yale	W 58–51	20–4 (8–0)	Payne Whitney Gym (1,935); New Haven, CT
February 19, 2011; 3:00 pm		at Brown	L 65–75	20–5 (8–1)	Pizzitola Sports Center (1,407); Providence, RI
February 25, 2011; 7:00 pm, FiOS1		Cornell	W 84–66	21–5 (9–1)	Jadwin Gymnasium (3,864); Princeton, NJ
February 26, 2011; 6:00 pm		Columbia	W 66–61	22–5 (10–1)	Jadwin Gymnasium (4,412); Princeton, NJ
March 4, 2011; 7:00 pm		at Dartmouth	W 77–55	23–5 (11–1)	Leede Arena (978); Hanover, NH
March 5, 2011; 7:00 pm, ESPN3		at Harvard	L 67–79	23–6 (11–2)	Lavietes Pavilion (2,195); Boston, MA
March 8, 2011; 7:00 pm, ESPN3		at Penn; Penn–Princeton Rivalry	W 70–58	24–6 (12–2)	Palestra (4,679); Philadelphia, PA
Ivy League Playoff
March 12, 2011; 4:00 pm, ESPN3		vs. Harvard	W 63–62	25–6	Payne Whitney Gymnasium; New Haven, CT
NCAA tournament
March 17, 2011*; 2:45 pm, CBS	(13 E)	vs. (4 E) No. 11 Kentucky; NCAA Second Round	L 57–59	25–7	St. Pete Times Forum (14,835); Tampa, FL
*Non-conference game. ^{#}Rankings from AP Poll. (#) Tournament seedings in parentheses. E=NCAA East Regional. All times are in Eastern Time.

== Honors ==
=== In season ===
Ian Hummer was a National Association of Basketball Coaches First Team All-District selection, and Kareem Maddox was a Second Team selection. Each week the Ivy League selects a player of the week and a rookie of the week.

	Player of the Week			
Date	Name	School	Class	Position
December 6, 2010	Ian Hummer	Princeton	So.	F
December 13, 2010	Kareem Maddox	Princeton	Sr.	F
December 20, 2010	Kareem Maddox	Princeton	Sr.	F
February 28, 2011	Kareem Maddox	Princeton	Sr.	F

=== Postseason honors ===
The league selected its postseason awards on March 9.
Defensive Player of the Year: Kareem Maddox (Sr., F, Oak Park, CA)
All-Ivy League (ALL CAPS: Unanimous)

First Team All-Ivy: KAREEM MADDOX (Sr., F, Oak Park, CA)
Second Team All-Ivy: Ian Hummer (So., F, Vienna, VA); Dan Mavraides, Princeton (Sr., G, San Mateo, CA)
