= 2007–08 Ivy League men's basketball season =

- League: NCAA Division I
- Sport: Basketball
- Teams: 8

Regular Season
- League champions: Cornell
- Season MVP: Louis Dale, Cornell

Basketball seasons
- ← 2006–07 2008–09 →

2007–08 Ivy League men's basketball standings
	Conf.				Overall
Team	W		L	PCT	W		L	PCT
Cornell	14	–	0	1.000	22	–	6	.786
Brown	11	–	3	.786	19	–	10	.655
Penn	8	–	6	.571	13	–	18	.419
Columbia	7	–	7	.500	14	–	15	.483
Yale	7	–	7	.500	13	–	15	.464
Dartmouth	3	–	11	.214	10	–	18	.357
Harvard	3	–	11	.214	8	–	22	.267
Princeton	3	–	11	.214	6	–	23	.207
Rankings from AP Poll

The 2007–08 Ivy League men's basketball season was the Ivy League's 54th season of basketball. Cornell University won the league title with a perfect 14-0 record in league play and was the Ivy League's representative at the 2008 NCAA Division I men's basketball tournament, snapping a 19-year streak of the Ivy League sending either University of Pennsylvania or Princeton University to the tournament. Louis Dale of Cornell was the Ivy League Men's Basketball Player of the Year.

== All-Ivy Teams ==
All-Ivy First Team
	School	Class	Position
Louis Dale	Cornell	Sophomore	Guard
John Baumann	Columbia	Senior	Forward
Damon Huffman	Brown	Senior	Guard
Mark McAndrew	Brown	Senior	Guard
Ryan Wittman	Cornell	Sophomore	Guard

All-Ivy Second Team
	School	Class	Position
Alex Barnett	Dartmouth	Junior	Forward
Jeff Foote	Cornell	Junior	Center
Adam Gore	Cornell	Junior	Guard
Brian Grandieri	Penn	Senior	Guard
Jeremy Lin	Harvard	Sophomore	Guard
Ross Morin	Yale	Junior	Forward
Travis Pinick	Yale	Junior	Forward
Noah Savage	Princeton	Senior	Forward
Chris Skrelja	Brown	Junior	Forward

== NCAA tournament ==
Seed	Region	School	First Four	Round of 64	Round of 32	Sweet 16	Elite Eight	Final Four	Championship
14	South	Cornell	n/a	Eliminated by Stanford, 77-53 (box)					
		W–L (%):	0–0 –	0–1 .000	0–0 .000	0–0 –	0–0 –	0–0 –	0–0 –Total:0-1 .000
