= 2007–08 Cornell Big Red men's basketball team =

American college basketball season

2007–08 Cornell Big Red men's basketball

Ivy League Champions

NCAA tournament, First Round
- Conference: Ivy League
- Record: 22–6 (14–0 Ivy)
- Head coach: Steve Donahue (8th season)
- Assistant coaches: Nat Graham; Woody Kampmann; Kevin App
- Home arena: Newman Arena

2007–08 Ivy League men's basketball standings
	Conf.				Overall
Team	W		L	PCT	W		L	PCT
Cornell	14	–	0	1.000	22	–	6	.786
Brown	11	–	3	.786	19	–	10	.655
Penn	8	–	6	.571	13	–	18	.419
Columbia	7	–	7	.500	14	–	15	.483
Yale	7	–	7	.500	13	–	15	.464
Dartmouth	3	–	11	.214	10	–	18	.357
Harvard	3	–	11	.214	8	–	22	.267
Princeton	3	–	11	.214	6	–	23	.207
Rankings from AP Poll

The 2007–08 Cornell Big Red men's basketball team represented Cornell University in the 2007–08 college basketball season. This was coach Steve Donahue's 8th season at Cornell. The Big Red compete in the Ivy League and played their home games at Newman Arena. They went 14–0 in Ivy League play to win the championship and received the league's automatic bid to the 2008 NCAA Division I men's basketball tournament. They received a 14 seed in the South region. They were beaten by No. 3 seed Stanford in the first round to finish their season at 22–6.

== Roster ==
2007–08 Cornell Big Red men's basketball team
Players
Coaches

Pos.	#	Name	Height	Weight	Year	Hometown
C	1	Jeff Foote	7 ft 0 in (2.13 m)	265 lb (120 kg)	Jr	Lockwood, New York
G	12	Louis Dale	5 ft 11 in (1.8 m)	180 lb (82 kg)	So	Birmingham, Alabama
F	20	Ryan Wittman	6 ft 6 in (1.98 m)	215 lb (98 kg)	So	Eden Prairie, Minnesota
G	23	Adam Gore	6 ft 0 in (1.83 m)	180 lb (82 kg)	Jr	Monrovia, Indiana
F	25	Jon Jaques	6 ft 7 in (2.01 m)	220 lb (100 kg)	So	Los Angeles, California

Head coach

- Steve Donahue (Ursinus)

Assistant coach(es)

Legend

- (C) Team captain
- (S) Suspended
- (I) Ineligible
- (W) Walk-on
- Injured
- Current redshirt

Roster

== Schedule and results ==
- All times are Eastern

Date time, TV	Rank^{#}	Opponent^{#}	Result	Record	Site (attendance) city, state
Non-conference regular season
Nov 10, 2007*		Lehigh	W 87–83	1–0	Newman Arena (3,742); Ithaca, New York
Nov 17, 2007*		at Ohio	L 89–102	1–1	Convocation Center (4,570); Athens, Ohio
Nov 20, 2007*		Army	W 93–78	2–1	Newman Arena (2,612); Ithaca, New York
Nov 25, 2007*		Siena	W 83–77	3–1	Newman Arena (2,471); Ithaca, New York
Nov 27, 2007*		Binghamton	W 73–68	4–1	Newman Arena (2,221); Ithaca, New York
Dec 1, 2007*		Colgate	L 73–76	4–2	Newman Arena (2,368); Ithaca, New York
Dec 19, 2007*		at Bucknell	L 75–88	4–3	Sojka Pavilion (2,984); Lewisburg, Pennsylvania
Dec 22, 2007*		at Syracuse	L 64–80	4–4	Carrier Dome (19,253); Syracuse, New York
Dec 29, 2007*		at Stony Brook	W 66–50	5–4	Pritchard Gymnasium (1,148); Stony Brook, New York
Dec 31, 2007*		at Quinnipiac	W 86–84 ^{OT}	6–4	TD Bank Sports Center (1,687); Hamden, Connecticut
Jan 6, 2008*; FSN		at No. 9 Duke	L 67–81	6–5	Cameron Indoor Stadium (9,314); Durham, North Carolina
Jan 10, 2008*		Alvernia	W 91–46	7–5	Newman Arena (923); Ithaca, New York
Jan 15, 2008*		at NJIT	W 64–33	8–5	Prudential Center (400); Newark, New Jersey
Ivy League Regular Season
Jan 19, 2008		Columbia	W 70–64	9–5 (1–0)	Newman Arena (3,109); Ithaca, New York
Jan 26, 2008		at Columbia	W 72–54	10–5 (2–0)	Levien Gymnasium (2,008); New York, New York
Feb 1, 2008		at Brown	W 75–64	11–5 (3–0)	Pizzitola Sports Center (1,812); Providence, Rhode Island
Feb 2, 2008		at Yale	W 66–45	12–5 (4–0)	Payne Whitney Gymnasium (2,156); New Haven, Connecticut
Feb 8, 2008		Princeton	W 72–61	13–5 (5–0)	Newman Arena (3,326); Ithaca, New York
Feb 9, 2008		Pennsylvania	W 87–74	14–5 (6–0)	Newman Arena (4,473); Ithaca, New York
Feb 15, 2008		at Harvard	W 72–71	15–5 (7–0)	Lavietes Pavilion (1,044); Cambridge, Massachusetts
Feb 16, 2008		at Dartmouth	W 73–63	16–5 (8–0)	Leede Arena (816); Hanover, New Hampshire
Feb 22, 2008		Yale	W 85–65	17–5 (9–0)	Newman Arena (3,589); Ithaca, New York
Feb 23, 2008		Brown	W 74–65	18–5 (10–0)	Newman Arena (4,254); Ithaca, New York
Feb 29, 2008		Dartmouth	W 75–59	19–5 (11–0)	Newman Arena (4,227); Ithaca, New York
Mar 1, 2008		Harvard	W 86–53	20–5 (12–0)	Newman Arena (4,473); Ithaca, New York
Mar 7, 2008		at Penn	W 94–92	21–5 (13–0)	The Palestra (4,865); Philadelphia, Pennsylvania
Mar 8, 2008		at Princeton	W 71–64	22–5 (14–0)	Jadwin Gymnasium (3,172); Princeton, New Jersey
NCAA tournament
Mar 20, 2008*	(14 S)	vs. (3 S) No. 10 Stanford; First Round	L 53–77	22–6	Honda Center (17,600); Anaheim, California
*Non-conference game. ^{#}Rankings from AP Poll. (#) Tournament seedings in parentheses. S=South.

== Awards and honors ==
- Louis Dale – Ivy League Player of the Year
