= Ian Hummer =

American basketball player (born 1990)

Personal information
- Born: August 23, 1990 (age 36)
- Listed height: 6 ft 7 in (2.01 m)
- Listed weight: 225 lb (102 kg)

Career information
- High school: Gonzaga (Washington, D. C.)
- College: Princeton (2009–2013)
- NBA draft: 2013: undrafted
- Playing career: 2014–present
- Position: Power forward

Career history
- 2014: ratiopharm Ulm
- 2014–2015: Nilan Bisons Loimaa
- 2016: BG Göttingen
- 2016–2017: TED Ankara Kolejliler
- 2017–2018: Avtodor Saratov
- 2018–2019: Monaco
- 2019: Nizhny Novgorod
- 2019–2020: Teksüt Bandırma
- 2020: EWE Baskets Oldenburg
- 2020–2021: Petkim Spor
- 2021–2022: AEK Athens
- 2022–2023: Galatasaray Nef
- 2023: Peristeri Athens
- 2023–2024: Osaka Evessa
- 2024–2025: Tasmania JackJumpers
- 2025–2026: Hong Kong Eastern

Career highlights
- Hong Kong A1 Division champion (2026); AP honorable mention All-American (2013); Ivy League Player of the Year (2013); 2× First-team All-Ivy (2012, 2013); Second-team All-Ivy (2011)

Ian MacDonald Hummer (born August 23, 1990) is an American-Azerbaijani professional basketball player. In high school, he was the 2009 The Washington Post Boys basketball Player of the Year for Gonzaga College High School as a senior. He played college basketball for the Princeton Tigers, where he was the 2013 Ivy League Men's Basketball Player of the Year and finished as the second leading scorer (behind Bill Bradley) and fifth leading rebounder in program history. He led the team to three postseason tournaments and the 2010–11 Ivy League Championship. He holds the Ivy League record for most single-season and career Player of the Week Awards. He earned Associated Press 2013 All-American honorable mention recognition.

Hummer has played professionally in countries such as Germany, Finland, Turkey, Russia, France (Monaco), Greece and Japan.

In 2024, Hummer debuted for the Azerbaijan men's national basketball team.

== High school career ==
Hummer played for Gonzaga College High School of the Washington Catholic Athletic Conference (WCAC). He joined the starting lineup for the final two months of his sophomore season. Hummer was a second team 2007–08 All-Metro DC selection by The Washington Post as Gonzaga finished as the top-ranked school in the Metro area during his junior year. The team's point guard was sophomore Tyler Thornton. Hummer scored 16 points and added 14 rebounds in the 2008 city championship game victory against Theodore Roosevelt High School. He was a 2008–09 All-Metro DC selection and Boys basketball Player of the Year by The Washington Post. Hummer scored a career-high 32 points and added 15 rebounds against DeMatha Catholic High School on January 21, 2009. His performance earned him recognition by ESPN RISE as its ESPN RISE National Boys Basketball Player of the Week. The team's success over #15-ranked Dematha propelled it from 43 to 13 in the national rankings. However, Gonzaga lost the 2009 WCAC championship by a 62–61 margin on a last second shot to DeMatha despite 18 points and 10 rebounds by Hummer. Hummer was selected to play in the 2009 Capital Classic.

Hummer was a 6-foot-7-inch (2.01 m) back to the basket player who generally defended opposing high school centers. He had an underdeveloped face-up game yet he was undersized to play that style of game in power conferences. Power conference schools questioned how much potential he had in a league where his low post skills would likely be defended by larger, stronger and/or more athletic players who relegated him to perimeter play. When Princeton head coach Sydney Johnson recruited him, the only competition was mid-major schools and Hummer was not interested in any of them. During his campus visit with his father at his brother Alex's (Princeton Class of 2011) dorm room, he decided at midnight to go hang out at Dan Mavraides room across campus, signalling to his father that he was pretty comfortable with Princeton and likely to attend. Due to Hummer's relationship with former Princeton and current Georgetown Hoyas men's basketball head coach John Thompson III, he was able to train at the Georgetown University gym over the summers. He also played in the Kenner League (the only National Collegiate Athletic Association–sanctioned summer league in the Washington, D.C.) during the summer.

College recruiting
Name	Hometown	School	Height	Weight	Commit date
Ian Hummer; PF	Vienna, VA	Gonzaga (Washington, D.C.)	6 ft 6 in (1.98 m)	207.5 lb (94.1 kg)	Oct 28, 2008
Ian Hummer; PF	Recruit ratings: Scout: Rivals: (86)				
Overall recruit ranking: ESPN: 62 (PF)
Note: In many cases, Scout, Rivals, 247Sports, On3, and ESPN may conflict in their listings of height and weight.; In these cases, the average was taken. ESPN grades are on a 100-point scale.; Sources: "Princeton 2009 Basketball Commitments". Rivals.; "2009 Princeton Basketball Commits". Scout.; "ESPN". ESPN.; "Scout.com Team Recruiting Rankings". Scout.; "2009 Team Ranking". Rivals.

== College career ==
Player of the Week summary

	Rookie of the Week		
Date	Name	Class	Position
December 14, 2009	Ian Hummer	Fr.	F
February 1, 2010	Ian Hummer	Fr.	F
	Player of the Week		
Date	Name	Class	Position
December 6, 2010	Ian Hummer	So.	F
December 19, 2011	Ian Hummer	Jr.	F
December 10, 2012	Ian Hummer	Sr.	F
December 17, 2012	Ian Hummer	Sr.	F
December 24, 2012	Ian Hummer	Sr.	F
January 7, 2013	Ian Hummer	Sr.	F
February 4, 2013	Ian Hummer	Sr.	F
February 25, 2013	Ian Hummer	Sr.	F
March 4, 2013	Ian Hummer	Sr.	F

=== Freshman season ===
On December 13, 2009, Hummer scored 17 points and added 2 steals and 2 rebounds with no turnovers in a 65–50 Princeton victory over UNC Greensboro. It marked the first game in which Hummer led Princeton in scoring. The following day he earned his first Ivy League Rookie of the Week recognition. On January 29, 2010, Hummer posted 10 points against Brown. He tallied 8 points and 4 rebounds against Yale the following night. He earned his second Ivy League Rookie of the Week award on February 1 as a result. Two of his three highest scoring games for the 2009–10 Tigers came in Princeton's two victories during the postseason 2010 College Basketball Invitational against Duquesne and IUPUI.

=== Sophomore season ===
On November 30, 2010, Hummer posted 22 points, 6 rebounds, 4 assists and 2 blocks against Lafayette. On December 5, he added 17 points, 8 rebounds, 3 assists and a steal against Saint Joseph's. In the two games, he shot 18-for-24 from the field for a 75% field goal percentage. On December 6, he earned Ivy League Player of the week. While starting 31 of 32 games, Hummer helped the 2010–11 team earn a share of the 2010–11 Ivy League men's basketball season championship, win a one-game playoff against Harvard and contest Kentucky with a two-point loss in the 2011 NCAA Men's Division I Basketball Tournament. That year, Hummer was a 2011 Second team All-Ivy and National Association of Basketball Coaches (NABC) First Team All-District selection.

=== Junior season ===
In the December 7 contest against Rutgers, Hummer scored the game-winning layup with three seconds left in the game. On December 14, 2011, Hummer tallied 21 points, 12 rebounds, 7 assists, and 4 steals in an overtime victory over Rider. Then on December 18, he had 20 points, 5 rebounds, 6 assists, 5 steals and 2 blocks against Northeastern. These back-to-back 20 point performances, which included a career high in assists against Rider and a career high in steals against Northeastern, earned him Ivy League Player of the Week recognition on December 19, 2011. His 25-point, 15-rebound effort in the December 30 triple overtime victory over eventual 2012 ACC men's basketball tournament champion Florida State tied his career-high point production and established a career high in rebounds. When Hummer scored 18 points on February 4, 2012, against Yale, he became the 29th Princeton Tiger (and 5th Princeton junior as well as 2nd Hummer family member) to reach the 1000-point plateau. Hummer's 515 points was the highest single-season total by a Princeton player since Bill Bradley. Hummer's efforts helped the 2011–12 team earn a bid to the 2012 College Basketball Invitational. He was a 2012 unanimous first team All-Ivy and a second team NABC All-District selection.

=== Senior season ===
Hummer was the unanimous preseason selection as Ivy League Player of the Year by a wide variety of media outlets, including Rivals.com and CBS Sports. He served as co-captain of the 2012–13 Princeton Tigers men's basketball team. On November 24, Hummer posted a career-high 28 points against Lafayette along with 7 rebounds, 5 assists, 4 steals, and a block. Hummer tallied 19 points, 7 rebounds, 5 assists and a steal against Drexel on December 8. He then earned Ivy League Player of the Week on December 10, 2012. Hummer tallied 18 points, 7 rebounds, 5 assists, 1 steal and 2 blocks against Fordham on December 15. This earned him a second straight Ivy League Player of the Week on December 17, 2012 That week he matched Bill Bradley as the only two Tigers with 1300 career points and 600 career rebounds. On December 20 and 22 against Rider and Bucknell, Hummer posted 15 points, 7 rebound, 5 assists, 2 steals and a block and then 17 points, 8 rebounds, 2 assists and 2 blocks. These performances earned Hummer a third straight Ivy League Player of the Week award on December 24, 2012. He was the first Princeton Tiger to earn three consecutive Player of the Week recognitions. On January 5, Hummer tied his career high with 28 points and added 6 rebounds, 1 assist, 2 steals and a block against Elon. Hummer was recognized with his fourth Ivy League Player of the Week award on January 7, 2013. The fourth Player of the Week recognition established a Princeton single-season record, surpassing Kareem Maddox '11.

Hummer tied the Ivy League record for single-season Player of the Week awards with his fifth on February 4. Hummer averaged 19 points, 8 rebounds and 5.5 assists in wins against Cornell and Columbia on February 1 and 2. His seven assists against Columbia was a career high. On February 22, Hummer posted 17 points, 3 rebounds, 5 assists and 3 steals against Columbia. The following night, he scored 17 points while adding 7 rebounds, 3 assists, 1 steal and 2 blocks against Cornell. The weekend victories mark the first weekend road sweep in two seasons. Hummer was rewarded as Ivy League Player of the week on February 25. His sixth player of the week recognitions doubled the previous school record and give him 8 career POTW honors. Hummer posted his first double-double of the season on March 2, when he had 23 points and 14 rebounds as Princeton hosted Harvard for a 58–53 victory. The game marked Princeton's 24th consecutive home win against Harvard. In the game, Hummer passed Kit Mueller and Doug Davis to move into second place on the Princeton career scoring list. The following night he had 13 points and 6 rebounds against Dartmouth. For the week, he earned Ivy League player of the week giving him a record seventh single-season recognition and record tying ninth career recognition. On March 12, the U.S. Basketball Writers Association named Hummer to its 2012–13 Men's All-District II (NY, NJ, DE, DC, PA, WV) Team, based upon voting from its national membership. Hummer was a unanimous First Team All-Ivy selection as well as Ivy League Men's Basketball Player of the Year, becoming Princeton's first since 1999. Hummer also surpassed Davis as the Ivy League's career leader in games played. On March 26, the National Association of Basketball Coaches named Hummer to its Division I All‐District 13 team as selected and voted on by member coaches of the NABC, making him eligible for the State Farm Coaches’ Division I All-America team. It was Hummer's third consecutive NABC honor. Hummer also earned Associated Press honorable mention All-American recognition.

== Professional career ==
Hummer was invited to tryout to be a member of the Los Angeles Lakers' roster for the 2013 NBA Summer League. In January 2014, he signed with ratiopharm Ulm of the German Basketball Bundesliga.

In August 2014, Hummer signed with the Nilan Bisons Loimaa of the Finnish Korisliiga.

In January 2016, Hummer signed with BG Göttingen of the Basketball Bundesliga.

On November 24, 2016, Hummer signed with the Turkish team TED Ankara Kolejliler.

On August 17, 2017, Hummer signed with Russian club Avtodor Saratov for the 2017–18 VTB United League season. He posted 10.2 points and 4.4 rebounds per game in the VTB League.

On August 3, 2018, Hummer inked with AS Monaco Basket of the LNB Pro A. On January 15, 2019, Hummer joined BC Nizhny Novgorod for the rest of the 2018–19 VTB United League season.

On October 5, 2019, Hummer signed with Teksüt Bandırma of the Basketball Super League (BSL).

On February 29, 2020, Hummer signed with EWE Baskets Oldenburg of the Basketball Bundesliga (BBL).

On July 29, 2020, Hummer signed with Petkim Spor of the Turkish BSL. He averaged 11.3 points, 5.0 rebounds, 3.1 assists, and 1.3 steals per game.

In October 2021, Hummer signed with AEK Athens of the Greek Basket League and the Basketball Champions League. In 22 Greek domestic league games, Hummer averaged 13.4 points, 6.4 rebounds, 2.3 assists, 0.5 blocks and 1.7 steals, while playing around 29 minutes per contest.

On October 21, 2022, Hummer signed with Galatasaray Nef of the Turkish BSL.

On February 1, 2023, Hummer returned to Greece, signing with Peristeri Athens for the rest of the season. In 18 league games, he averaged 9.4 points, 3.7 rebounds and 1.4 assists, playing around 21 minutes per contest.

On June 21, 2023, Hummer signed with Osaka Evessa of the Japanese B.League.

On December 14, 2024, Hummer signed with the Tasmania JackJumpers of the Australian National Basketball League (NBL) for the rest of the 2024–25 season. In 12 games, he averaged 4.6 points per game.

== National team career ==
In 2024, Hummer debuted for the Azerbaijan men's national basketball team in the 2027 FIBA Basketball World Cup European Pre-Qualifiers.

== Personal life ==
Ian's father, Ed, was a member of Princeton's class of 1967 and a former high school All-American. Ed helped Bill Bradley take the 1964–65 Princeton Tigers to the semifinals of the 1965 NCAA Men's Division I Basketball Tournament. His uncle, John Hummer, was a member of Princeton's class of 1970 and played six seasons in the National Basketball Association. Ian's mother, Judy, died of breast cancer at the end of his freshman year of high school. His older brother Alex is a Princeton class of 2011 graduate.
