= 2010–11 Ivy League men's basketball season =

- League: NCAA Division I
- Sport: Basketball
- Duration: January 8 – March 8, 2011
- Teams: 8

Regular season
- League co-champions: Harvard, Princeton
- Season MVP: Keith Wright, Harvard

One-game playoff (March 12)
- Champions: Princeton 63–62
- Runners-up: Harvard

Basketball seasons
- ← 2009–10 2011–12 →

2010–11 Ivy League men's basketball standings
| | Conf. | | | | Overall |
| Team | W | | L | PCT | W | | L | PCT |
|---|---|---|---|---|---|---|---|---|
| Princeton | 12 | – | 2 | .857 | 25 | – | 7 | .781 |
| Harvard | 12 | – | 2 | .857 | 23 | – | 7 | .767 |
| Yale | 8 | – | 6 | .571 | 15 | – | 13 | .536 |
| Penn | 7 | – | 7 | .500 | 13 | – | 15 | .464 |
| Columbia | 6 | – | 8 | .429 | 15 | – | 13 | .536 |
| Cornell | 6 | – | 8 | .429 | 10 | – | 18 | .357 |
| Brown | 4 | – | 10 | .286 | 11 | – | 17 | .393 |
| Dartmouth | 1 | – | 13 | .071 | 5 | – | 23 | .179 |
As of March 17, 2011; Rankings from AP Poll

The 2010–11 Ivy League men's basketball season marks the continuation of the annual tradition of competitive basketball among Ivy League members that began when the league was formed during the 1956–57 season, continuing from the predecessor Eastern Intercollegiate Basketball League, which was formed in 1902. Following the annual 14-game round robin home & home schedule, Harvard and Princeton tied as co-champion. Princeton earned the conference's automatic bid to the 2011 NCAA Men's Division I Basketball Tournament in a one-game playoff. Harvard was invited to the 2011 National Invitation Tournament. Both teams lost their first tournament games.

== Preseason ==
Entering the 2010–11 NCAA Division I men's basketball season, four of the eight teams had coaches entering their first full season as head coach: Columbia's Kyle Smith, Cornell's Bill Courtney, Dartmouth's Paul Cormier and Penn's Jerome Allen (previously interim). Most preseason publications predicted Princeton would finish in first place and Harvard would finish in second place, although the Sporting News projected that Cornell would finish in first followed by Princeton and Harvard. Breaking a three-year streak by Cornell, the Ivy League media poll selected Princeton as the top team with twelve first place votes, Harvard second with four first place votes and Cornell third with one first place vote. It was the first Princeton team to be the preseason selection since the 2004–05 Princeton team.

== Season ==
Non-conference play began on November 12, 2010. The first conference game took place on January 8, 2011. Although no Ivy League teams appeared in the 2010–11 NCAA Division I men's basketball rankings, for a few weeks during the season Harvard received a vote in the AP Poll. When Harvard earned its 20th win on February 19, against Columbia, it marked the eighth time that two Ivy League teams totalled 20 wins. On March 7, Harvard received a vote in both the AP Poll and the Coaches' Poll. Then, in the final regular season poll on March 13, Princeton received 3 points in the Coaches' Poll.

The conference had two players recognized as Academic All-Americans: Brown senior guard Garrett Leffelman and Cornell junior guard Chris Wroblewski.

Harvard's Oliver McNally concluded his season with a 100 for 108 (92.6%) Free throw percentage mark second to Chris Warren of the Ole Miss Rebels who led with a 168 for 181 (92.8%) mark.

On March 5, Harvard clinched a share of the league championship for the first time since the Ivy League was formed. On March 8, Princeton defeated Penn to force a one-game playoff at the Payne Whitney Gymnasium at Yale University in New Haven, Connecticut. The matchup was widely anticipated in the press.

=== Postseason ===
Prior to the game both teams received championship trophies. Princeton prevailed in the playoff with a final score of 63–62, on a last-second jump shot from Douglas Davis. This earned them the conference's automatic bid to the 2011 NCAA Men's Division I Basketball Tournament for being the regular season champion. The 2011 one-game playoff was the eighth in Ivy League history. Princeton appeared for the eighth time, and have won at least a share of twenty-six league titles.

Entering selection Sunday (March 13), Harvard ranked 35th in the Ratings Percentage Index (RPI) and Princeton ranked 40th. Princeton was a #13 Seed in the 2011 NCAA Men's Division I Basketball Tournament, while Harvard was not selected, denying the Crimson its first tournament appearance since 1946. Harvard's wins against major-conference opponents Colorado and Boston College were not enough to secure it an at-large bid (both Colorado and Boston College were left out of the NCAA tournament and received one-seeds in the NIT tournament.) As a regular season champion not invited to the NCAA tournament, Harvard earned an at-large selection for the 2011 National Invitation Tournament, where it was seeded #6. On March 15, Harvard was defeated by Oklahoma State by a 71–54 margin in the first round. It was the school's first appearance in the National Invitation Tournament. Princeton lost its opening game against the fourth-seeded and eventual national semifinalist Kentucky Wildcats by a 59–57 margin on a last second layup.

== Honors ==
=== In season ===
Each week the Ivy League selects a player of the week and a rookie of the week.

| | Player of the Week | | | | Rookie of the Week | | |
| | Name | School | Class | Position | Name | School | Position |
| November 15, 2010 | Keith Wright | Harvard | Jr. | F | Miles Cartwright | Penn | G |
| November 22, 2010 | Christian Webster | Harvard | So. | G | Sean McGonagill | Brown | G |
| | Austin Morgan | Yale | So. | G | | | |
| November 29, 2010 | Keith Wright | Harvard | Jr. | F | Miles Cartwright | Penn | G |
| December 6, 2010 | Ian Hummer | Princeton | So. | F | Laurent Rivard | Harvard | G |
| December 13, 2010 | Noruwa Agho | Columbia | Jr. | G | Steve Fankoski | Columbia | G |
| | Kareem Maddox | Princeton | Sr. | F | | | |
| December 20, 2010 | Kareem Maddox | Princeton | Sr. | F | Gediminas Bertasius | Dartmouth | F |
| December 27, 2010 | Zack Rosen | Penn | Jr. | G | Miles Cartwright | Penn | G |
| January 3, 2011 | Chris Wroblewski | Cornell | Jr. | G | Laurent Rivard | Harvard | G |
| January 10, 2011 | Noruwa Agho | Columbia | Jr. | G | Dockery Walker | Brown | G |
| | Greg Mangano | Yale | Jr. | C | | | |
| January 17, 2011 | Noruwa Agho | Columbia | Jr. | G | Laurent Rivard | Harvard | G |
| | Greg Mangano | Yale | Jr. | C | | | |
| January 24, 2011 | Greg Mangano | Yale | Jr. | C | Jeremiah Kreisberg | Yale | F |
| January 31, 2011 | Kyle Casey | Harvard | So. | F | Miles Cartwright | Penn | G |
| | Jack Eggleston | Penn | Sr. | F | | | |
| February 7, 2011 | Sean McGonagill | Brown | G | | Sean McGonagill | Brown | G |
| February 14, 2011 | Keith Wright | Harvard | Jr. | F | Sean McGonagill | Brown | G |
| | Greg Mangano | Yale | Jr. | C | | | |
| February 21, 2011 | Peter Sullivan | Brown | Sr. | F | Sean McGonagill | Brown | G |
| | Tyler Bernardini | Penn | Sr. | F | | | |
| February 28, 2011 | Kareem Maddox | Princeton | Sr. | F | Jeremiah Kreisberg | Yale | F |
| March 7, 2011 | Brandyn Curry | Harvard | So. | G | Meiko Lyles | Columbia | G |

=== Postseason honors ===
The league selected its postseason awards on March 9.
Player of the Year: Keith Wright, Harvard (Jr., F, Suffolk, VA)
Defensive Player of the Year: Kareem Maddox, Princeton (Sr., F, Oak Park, CA)
Rookie of the Year: Sean McGonagill, Brown (Fr., G, Brookfield, IL)
All-Ivy League (ALL CAPS: Unanimous)

First Team All-Ivy: Noruwa Agho, Columbia (Jr., G, New City, NY); KEITH WRIGHT, Harvard (Jr., F, Suffolk, VA); Zack Rosen, Penn (Jr., G, Colonia, NJ); KAREEM MADDOX, Princeton (Sr., F, Oak Park, CA); GREG MANGANO, Yale (Jr., C, Orange, CT)
Second Team All-Ivy: Chris Wroblewski, Cornell (Jr., G, Highland Park, IL); Kyle Casey, Harvard (So., F, Medway, MA); Brandyn Curry, Harvard (So., G, Huntersville, NC); Ian Hummer, Princeton (So., F, Vienna, VA); Dan Mavraides, Princeton (Sr., G, San Mateo, CA)
Honorable Mention: Tucker Halpern, Brown (So., F, Brookline, MA); Brian Barbour, Columbia (So., G, Alamo, CA); Christian Webster, Harvard (So., G, Washington, DC); Jack Eggleston, Penn (Sr., F, Noblesville, IN)
