= 2010–11 Harvard Crimson men's basketball team =

American college basketball season

2010–11 Harvard Crimson men's basketball

Ivy League Co-Champion

2011 NIT, First Round
- Conference: Ivy League
- Record: 23–7 (12–2, 1st-T Ivy League)
- Head coach: Tommy Amaker
- Assistant coaches: Kenny Blakeney; Brian DeStefano; Yanni Hufnagel
- Captains: Oliver McNally; Keith Wright
- Home arena: Lavietes Pavilion

2010–11 Ivy League men's basketball standings
| | Conf. | | | | Overall |
| Team | W | | L | PCT | W | | L | PCT |
|---|---|---|---|---|---|---|---|---|
| Princeton | 12 | – | 2 | .857 | 25 | – | 7 | .781 |
| Harvard | 12 | – | 2 | .857 | 23 | – | 7 | .767 |
| Yale | 8 | – | 6 | .571 | 15 | – | 13 | .536 |
| Penn | 7 | – | 7 | .500 | 13 | – | 15 | .464 |
| Columbia | 6 | – | 8 | .429 | 15 | – | 13 | .536 |
| Cornell | 6 | – | 8 | .429 | 10 | – | 18 | .357 |
| Brown | 4 | – | 10 | .286 | 11 | – | 17 | .393 |
| Dartmouth | 1 | – | 13 | .071 | 5 | – | 23 | .179 |
As of March 17, 2011; Rankings from AP Poll

The 2010–11 Harvard Crimson men's basketball team represented Harvard University in the Ivy League athletic conference during the 2010–11 NCAA Division I men's basketball season. The team played its home games in Boston, Massachusetts at the Lavietes Pavilion, which has a capacity of 2,195. The team was led by fourth-year head coach Tommy Amaker. By earning a share of the 2010–11 Ivy League men's basketball season title, the team became the first men's basketball Ivy League champion in school history. This was the 100th season for Harvard basketball.

After the annual 14-game double round robin schedule, Harvard and Princeton tied as co-champion, resulting in a one-game playoff to determine the league's automatic bid to the 2011 NCAA Division I men's basketball tournament. After losing, the team earned an at-large bid to the 2011 National Invitation Tournament, where they lost in the first round. It was the school's first appearance in the National Invitation Tournament.

The seniorless team was captained by Keith Wright and Oliver McNally. Wright, a junior, was a unanimous All-Ivy first team selection and named Ivy League Men's Basketball Player of the Year. Sophomores Kyle Casey and Brandyn Curry were named All-Ivy second team and sophomore Christian Webster was an honorable mention. The team established a new school record for single-season wins, a record for conference game wins and by going undefeated at home set a record for home wins.

== Preseason ==
The team was coming off a 2009–10 season during which it set a school record for wins (21), non-conference wins (11), home wins (11), and road/neutral wins (10). However, the team lost its star Jeremy Lin to the National Basketball Association. The team entered the season not having participated in the NCAA Division I men's basketball tournament since the 1946 Tournament. It also entered the season as the only member school not to have won at least one Ivy League men's basketball championship since the league was formed during the 1956–57 season. Of the 34 men's and women's sports in which Harvard competes, this was the only sport that they had never won a championship. They had only finished in second three times in the past and only one of those was outright.

Most preseason publications predicted Princeton would finish in first place and Harvard would finish in second place, although the Sporting News projected that Cornell would finish in first followed by Princeton and Harvard. Breaking a three-year streak by Cornell, the Ivy League media poll selected Princeton as the top team with twelve first place votes, Harvard second with four first place votes and Cornell third with one first place vote. It was the first Princeton team to be the preseason selection since the 2004–05 Princeton team.

== Season ==
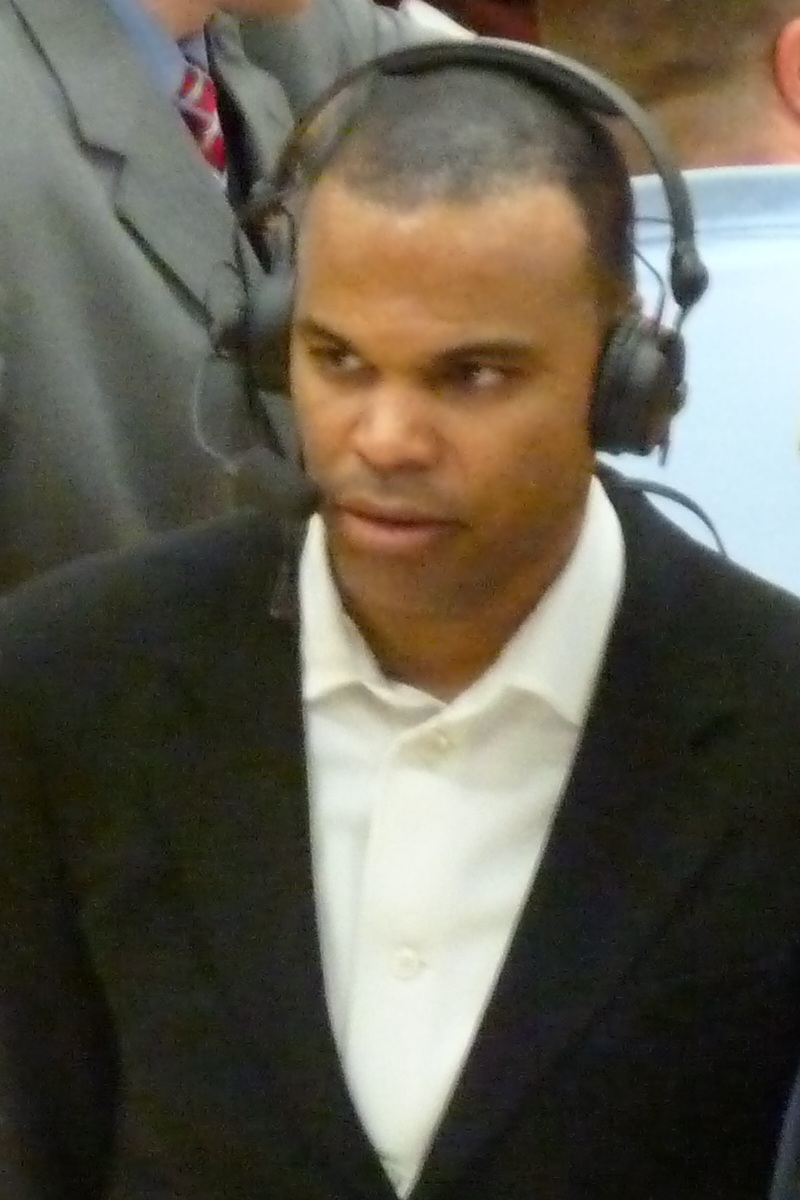
Tommy Amaker moments after clinching Harvard's first Ivy League title

During the season, the team lost to its only ranked opponent, #4 Connecticut (December 22), but defeated power conference opponents Boston College (January 5) of the Atlantic Coast Conference and Colorado (November 28) of the Big 12 Conference. The Colorado victory was the team's first ever against a Big 12 opponent. In addition to defeating Boston College, the team defeated other cross-town rivals Boston University (December 11) and MIT (December 31). The team also lost to Amaker's former team (as a coach), Michigan (December 4). The Harvard gameplan involved fast breaks initiated by its defensive and an inside-outside game. Although Harvard never appeared in the 2010–11 NCAA Division I men's basketball rankings, for a few weeks (January 24, January 31 and February 21 and March 7) during the season they received a vote in the AP Poll.

As the season wound down, there was much ado in the press about a possible Harvard Ivy League championship. The most recent Harvard team to be in contention for a championship entering the final weekend was the 1984 team. On March 5, Harvard clinched a share of the league championship for the first time since the Ivy League was formed. By defeating Princeton at home on March 5 and earning a split of the season series, they clinched at least a share of the 2010–11 Ivy League men's basketball season Championship with a 12–2 conference record. Princeton fell to 11–2 with one conference game remaining to force a one-game playoff for the conferences automatic bid to the 2011 NCAA Division I men's basketball tournament. Harvard finished the season a perfect 14–0 at home, which surpassed the prior season's record of eleven home wins. Harvard will enter the 2011–12 NCAA Division I men's basketball season with a 17-game home streak (10th longest in the country). Harvard's 12 conference game wins was also a school record. On March 7, Harvard received a vote in both the AP Poll and the Coaches' Poll. It was the first time in program history that they received votes in the Coaches' Poll.

== Postseason ==
On March 8, Princeton defeated Penn to force a one-game playoff at the Payne Whitney Gymnasium at Yale University in New Haven, Connecticut. Princeton won the playoff by a 63–62 margin. However, many thought Harvard had a chance to make the tournament in spite of the loss as an at-large team. Four of Harvard's regular season losses were to postseason contenders, and Cornell represented the conference well the year before. Entering selection Sunday (March 13), Harvard ranked 35th in the Ratings Percentage Index (RPI). However, Harvard was not selected. Unfortunately, neither of Harvard's quality wins (against Colorado and Boston College) helped them because both teams were left out of the NCAA tournament and relegated to number one seed status in the NIT tournament. It was the Ivy League's first NIT invitation since the 2003 when Brown participated. As a regular season champion not invited to the NCAA tournament, they were an at-large selection for the 2011 National Invitation Tournament, where they were seeded #6. On March 15, Harvard was defeated by Oklahoma State by a 71–54 margin in the first round. The final record of 23–7 established a school record for number of wins, surpassing the prior season's total of 21. Harvard finished the season ranked 40th nationally by the Collegiate Basketball News RPI, CollegeRPI.com RPI and NCAA RPI. The team finished second in the nation in free throw percentage (80.8%), led by Oliver McNally who was 2nd as an individual with a 92.6% and Christian Webster who was 12th with an 89.4%. Harvard had no seniors on the team and was expected to be a contender again the following season.

== Schedule ==
| Date time, TV | Rank^{#} | Opponent^{#} | Result | Record | Site (attendance) city, state |
Regular season
| November 13, 2010*; 4:00 pm | | at George Mason | L 53–66 | 0–1 | Patriot Center (6,536); Fairfax, VA |
| November 17, 2010*; 7:00 pm | | Holy Cross | W 72–49 | 1–1 | Lavietes Pavilion (1,253); Boston, MA |
| November 20, 2010*; 3:00 pm | | at Mercer | W 75–69 | 2–1 | University Center (2,934); Macon, GA |
| November 24, 2010*; 4:00 pm | | at Bryant | W 69–66 | 3–1 | Chace Athletic Center (450); Smithfield, RI |
| November 28, 2010*; 1:00 pm | | Colorado | W 82–66 | 4–1 | Lavietes Pavilion (954); Boston, MA |
| December 1, 2010*; 7:00 pm | | Fordham | W 80–57 | 5–1 | Lavietes Pavilion (774); Boston, MA |
| December 4, 2010*; 1:00 pm | | at Michigan | L 62–65 | 5–2 | Crisler Arena (9,559); Ann Arbor, MI |
| December 7, 2010*; 7:00 pm | | WPI | W 69–54 | 6–2 | Lavietes Pavilion (578); Boston, MA |
| December 11, 2010*; 2:00 pm | | Boston University | W 87–71 | 7–2 | Lavietes Pavilion (1,487); Boston, MA |
| December 22, 2010*; 7:00 pm, ESPN3 | | at No. 4 Connecticut | L 52–81 | 7–3 | XL Center (11,255); Hartford, CT |
| December 29, 2010*; 7:00 pm | | Monmouth | W 74–69 | 8–3 | Lavietes Pavilion (819); Boston, MA |
| December 31, 2010*; 2:00 pm | | MIT | W 84–58 | 9–3 | Lavietes Pavilion (1,153); Boston, MA |
| January 5, 2011*; 7:00 pm | | at Boston College | W 78–69 | 10–3 | Silvio O. Conte Forum (4,129); Chestnut Hill, MA |
| January 8, 2011; 4:00 pm | | at Dartmouth | W 68–53 | 11–3 (1–0) | Leede Arena (1,551); Hanover, NH |
| January 15, 2011*; 2:00 pm | | at George Washington | W 67–62 | 12–3 | Charles E. Smith Center (2,632); Washington, DC |
| January 22, 2011; 2:00 pm | | Dartmouth | W 59–50 | 13–3 (2–0) | Lavietes Pavilion (1,469); Boston, MA |
| January 28, 2011; 7:00 pm | | Columbia | W 77–66 | 14–3 (3–0) | Lavietes Pavilion (1,601); Boston, MA |
| January 29, 2011; 6:00 pm | | Cornell | W 78–57 | 15–3 (4–0) | Lavietes Pavilion (2,195); Boston, MA |
| February 4, 2011; 7:00 pm, ESPNU | | Princeton | L 61–65 | 15–4 (4–1) | Jadwin Gymnasium (4,148); Princeton, NJ |
| February 5, 2011; 7:00 pm | | at Penn | W 83–82 ^{2OT} | 16–4 (5–1) | Palestra (6,283); Philadelphia, PA |
| February 11, 2011; 7:00 pm | | Yale | W 78–75 | 17–4 (6–1) | Lavietes Pavilion (1,763); Boston, MA |
| February 12, 2011; 7:00 pm | | Brown | W 85–78 | 18–4 (7–1) | Lavietes Pavilion (1,377); Boston, MA |
| February 18, 2011; 7:00 pm | | at Cornell | W 73–60 | 19–4 (8–1) | Newman Arena (2,012); Ithaca, NY |
| February 19, 2011; 7:00 pm | | at Columbia | W 61–42 | 20–4 (9–1) | Levien Gymnasium (2,616); New York, NY |
| February 25, 2011; 7:00 pm | | at Brown | W 74–68 | 21–4 (10–1) | Pizzitola Sports Center (1,525); Providence, RI |
| February 26, 2011; 6:00 pm | | at Yale | L 69–70 | 21–5 (10–2) | Payne Whitney Gymnasium (3,864); New Haven, CT |
| March 4, 2011; 7:00 pm | | Columbia | W 79–64 | 22–5 (11–2) | Lavietes Pavilion (2,195); Boston, MA |
| March 5, 2011; 7:00 pm, ESPN3 | | Princeton | W 79–67 | 23–5 (12–2) | Lavietes Pavilion (2,195); Boston, MA |
Ivy League Playoff
| March 12, 2011; 4:00 pm, ESPN3 | | vs. Princeton | L 62–63 | 23–6 | Payne Whitney Gymnasium; New Haven, CT |
NIT
| March 15, 2011*; 7:30 pm, ESPN | (6 BC) | at (3 BC) Oklahoma State; NIT First Round | L 54–71 | 23–7 | Gallagher-Iba Arena (5,342); Stillwater, OK |
*Non-conference game. ^{#}Rankings from AP Poll. (#) Tournament seedings in parentheses. BC=NIT Boston College bracket. All times are in Eastern Time.

== Honors ==
=== In season ===
Each week the Ivy League selects a player of the week and a rookie of the week.

| | Player of the Week | | | | Rookie of the Week | | |
| | Name | School | Class | Position | Name | School | Position |
| November 15, 2010 | Keith Wright | Harvard | Jr. | F | | | |
| November 22, 2010 | Christian Webster | Harvard | So. | G | | | |
| November 29, 2010 | Keith Wright | Harvard | Jr. | F | | | |
| December 6, 2010 | | | | | Laurent Rivard | Harvard | G |
| January 3, 2011 | | | | | Laurent Rivard | Harvard | G |
| January 17, 2011 | | | | | Laurent Rivard | Harvard | G |
| January 31, 2011 | Kyle Casey | Harvard | So. | F | | | |
| February 14, 2011 | Keith Wright | Harvard | Jr. | F | | | |
| March 7, 2011 | Brandyn Curry | Harvard | So. | G | | | |

=== Postseason honors ===
Keith Wright was an Associated Press honorable mention All-American, a CollegeInsider.com Lou Henson All-American and a National Association of Basketball Coaches First Team All-District selection. The Ivy League selected its postseason awards on March 9.
Player of the Year: Keith Wright, Harvard (Jr., F, Suffolk, VA)
All-Ivy League (ALL CAPS: Unanimous)

First Team All-Ivy: KEITH WRIGHT, Harvard (Jr., F, Suffolk, VA)
Second Team All-Ivy: Kyle Casey, Harvard (So., F, Medway, MA); Brandyn Curry, Harvard (So., G, Huntersville, NC)
Honorable Mention: Christian Webster, Harvard (So., G, Washington, DC)
