= Chris Wroblewski =

American college basketball player

Personal information
- Born: c. 1989 (age 36–37)
- Listed height: 6 ft 0 in (1.83 m)
- Listed weight: 180 lb (82 kg)

Career information
- High school: Highland Park (Highland Park, Illinois)
- College: Cornell (2008–2012)
- NBA draft: 2012: undrafted
- Position: Point guard

Career highlights
- As player: 2× Third-team Academic All-American (2011, 2012); First-Team All-Ivy (2012); Second-Team All-Ivy (2011); Ivy League Rookie of the Year (2009)

Christopher William Wroblewski (born 1989/1990) is an American former college basketball player. He played college basketball for Cornell of the Ivy League, where he is the school's all-time career assists (482) leader and the school's only two-time Academic All-America basketball selection. He was the starting point guard for the winningest team (29 wins) in Ivy League history: the 2009–10 Big Red. He earned Ivy League accolades all four seasons: Ivy League Rookie of the Year (2009), All-Ivy Honorable Mention (2010), All-Ivy Second-Team (2011), and All-Ivy First-Team (2012).

Before college, he played at Highland Park High School, where he set the record for all-time career 3-point shots made (211). He led Highland Park to its first back-to-back 20-win seasons. He received no college scholarship offers in high school.

== Early life ==
Wroblewski is the younger of two sons born to Peter and Valerie Wroblewski. As a freshman, Wroblewski helped a foul-plagued Highland Park team survive to a second overtime in the 2005 Illinois High School Association (IHSA) Class AA regional semifinal.

As a sophomore for a seniorless 2005–06 Highland Park team, he posted 28 points in a 60–58 overtime victory over Mount Carmel High School. The team fell in the 2006 IHSA Class AA regional semifinal.

Prior to his junior season, the Chicago Sun-Times named him as one of the top 5 players to watch in the Central Suburban North League. The 2007 team survived to the 2007 IHSA Class AA sectional semifinals, finishing with a 23–6 record.

Prior to his senior season, the Chicago Tribune listed Wroblewski as one of the top 25 players in the area. In December 2007, he committed to Cornell. By mid-December he had become Highland Park's all-time leading three-point shooter. On December 14, 2007, he scored 38 points in a 60–59 overtime victory that ended Glenbrook North High School's 46-game home winning streak. He was the Central Suburban League North's Player of the Year and an Illinois Basketball Coaches Association all-state selection. The 2008 Highland Park senior class was the first in school history to have back-to-back 20-win seasons. During his high school career, Wroblewski got no NCAA Division I scholarship offers.

== College career ==
=== Freshman season ===
Wroblewski earned 2008–09 Ivy League Rookie of the Year recognition. He was twice named Ivy League Rookie of the Week (January 19 and March 9). Wroblewski led the Ivy League in three-point field goal percentage during the Ivy League schedule (min. 18 made, 22–42=52.4%).

=== Sophomore season ===
Wroblewski had 20+-point efforts against high majors for the Big Red: 22 against Seton Hall and 20 against Syracuse. Later, in the season he helped keep number-one ranked Kansas on the verge of defeat at Allen Fieldhouse until they took the lead with 41 seconds remaining and held on. The team eventually became the 2009–10 Ivy League champions (the schools 4th, 3rd consecutive and most recent Ivy League Championship) and reached the Sweet Sixteen round of the 2010 NCAA Division I men's basketball tournament. They were the first Ivy League team to reach the Sweet Sixteen since the 1978–79 Penn Quakers and set an Ivy League record with 29 wins. In the victory over Wisconsin that sent them to the Sweet Sixteen, Wroblewski scored 12 points. Wroblewski, who started 33 of the 34 games, is one of six players on the team to set the Ivy League single-season record for games played (34). He led the team in three-point field goal percentage (min 100 att, 54/119=45.4%) and FT% (min 50 att, 55/63=87.3%). He earned 2009–10 All-Ivy League honorable mention recognition. Wroblewski was a 2010 District 1 First-Team Academic All-District Men's Basketball Team selection, making him 1 of the 40 finalists for the 15-man Academic All-American team.

=== Junior season ===
Following the 29-win season the year before, 8 seniors graduated and head coach Steve Donahue left to coach in the Atlantic Coast Conference. Wroblewski was named one of three co-captains. On January 3, 2011, he earned Ivy League Player of the Week for his performances in the Richmond Marriott Holidays on the Hardwood Tournament at VCU against New Hampshire and Wofford. Against Wofford, he posted 12 assists, which is the second-highest single-game total in school history. The performance, which included 21 points and set a Cornell record for most single-game assists off the bench, became his first career double-double. On January 8, 2011, Wroblewski had a career-high 29 points against Stony Brook. That season, he led the Ivy League in steals per game (1.5). He led the team in points (369, 14.2), 3pt% (min 100 att, 52/120=43.3%), FT% (min 50 att, 97/118=82.2%), assists (149, 5.7 avg.), steals (40, 1.5 avg.), and minutes (851, 32.7 avg). Wroblewski earned Second-Team 2010–11 All-Ivy League recognition. Wroblewski was named a 2011 Academic All-America third team selection by CoSIDA and ESPN The Magazine. He was the fourth Big Red basketball player to be named Academic All-American.

=== Senior season ===
Wroblewski served as a senior co-captain. In his 104th career game, Wroblewski established a Cornell record for the slowest achievement of 1000 career points scored. In a February 10, 2012, overtime win against Yale, Wroblewski nearly became the first Big Red basketball player to record a triple-double when he posted 18 points, 10 assists, and eight rebounds. The 10 assists established a Cornell record for single-game assists without a turnover. On February 13, he earned Ivy League Player of the Week recognition for a week that included 18 assists and 1 turnover. His third and final career double-double occurred on February 24, when he scored 24 points and posted a career-high 11 rebounds against Brown. On March 2, 2012, Wroblewski became the all-time assist leader at Cornell during a victory against Dartmouth. He led the team in points (323, 11.5 per game), FT percentage (84.6%), assists (147, 5.3 per game), steals (45, 1.6 per game), and minutes (944, 33.7 per game). He earned First-Team 2011–12 All-Ivy League recognition. Wroblewski was named a 2012 Academic All-America third team selection by CoSIDA and Capital One. He is Cornell's first 2-time basketball Academic All-American. Wroblewski studied Applied Economics and Management in Cornell's Dyson School.

== Professional career ==
In August 2015, Wroblewski and Highland Park classmate Josh Bartelstein hosted a two-day basketball skills development camp in the North Shore for youth between 3rd and 12th grade. At the time, Wroblewski was a 7th and 8th-grade basketball coach in Highland Park. In 2016, he teamed up with Highland Park teammate Zack Meuser to run a similar camp. In 2019, Wroblewski was living in Chicago with his wife, Brittany, and working at an investment management firm when they decided to try their hands as entrepreneurs.

== See also ==
- Cornell Big Red men's basketball statistical leaders
