= Steve Donahue =

American basketball coach (born 1962)

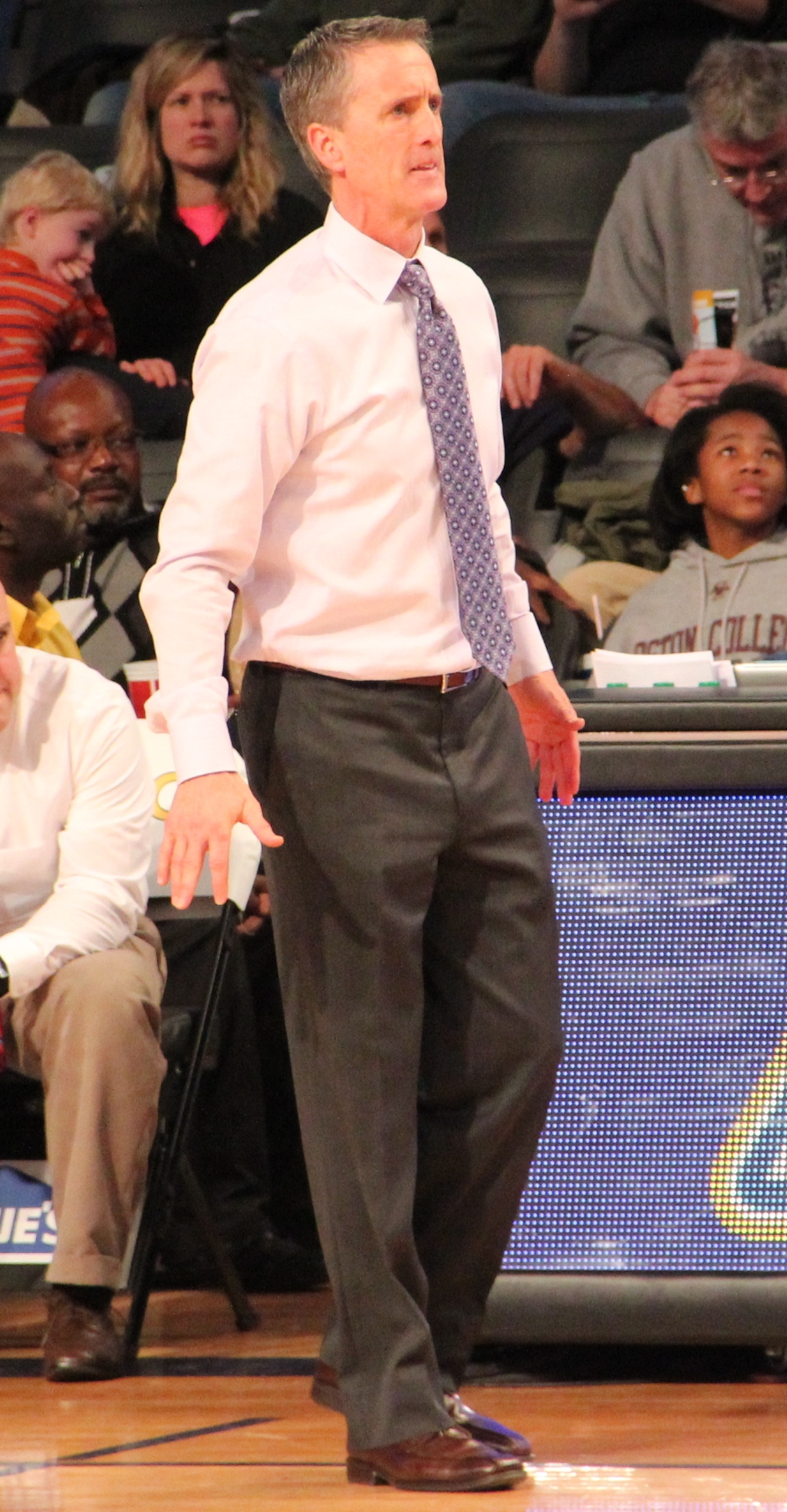
- Donahue in 2014

Current position
- Title: Head coach
- Team: Saint Joseph's
- Conference: Atlantic 10
- Record: 28–12 (.700)

Biographical details
- Born: May 21, 1962 (age 64)

Playing career
- 1980–1984: Ursinus

Coaching career (HC unless noted)
- 1984–1987: Springfield HS (PA) (assistant)
- 1987–1988: Monsignor Bonner HS (PA) (assistant)
- 1988–1990: Philadelphia (assistant)
- 1990–2000: Penn (assistant)
- 2000–2010: Cornell
- 2010–2014: Boston College
- 2015–2025: Penn
- 2025–present: Saint Joseph's

Head coaching record
- Overall: 359–356 (.502)
- Tournaments: 2–4 (NCAA Division I); 3–2 (NIT)

Accomplishments and honors

Championships
- 4 Ivy League regular season (2008–2010, 2018); Ivy League tournament (2018)

Awards
- Clair Bee Coach of the Year Award (2010); 2× NABC District Coach of the Year (2008, 2010); Ivy League Coach of the Year (2018); Atlantic 10 Coach of the Year (2026)

Steve Donahue (born May 21, 1962) is an American college basketball coach who is the head coach of the Saint Joseph's Hawks men's basketball team. He has also served as head coach at Cornell, Boston College, and Penn.

== Background ==
Donahue is a native of Springfield Township, Pennsylvania and a former player at Ursinus College.

== Career ==
=== Early jobs ===
Prior to becoming the head coach at Cornell University, Donahue began his coaching career as an assistant coach at Springfield High School, Monsignor Bonner High School, Philadelphia University, and The University of Pennsylvania.

=== Cornell ===
Donahue had been the head coach at Cornell from September 2000 until April 6, 2010. Cornell struggled early under Donahue, but he eventually turned the program around. A March 1, 2008 win over the Harvard Crimson gave Cornell the Ivy League championship for the first time since 1988 and just the second title in program history. On March 6, 2009, with Princeton's loss to Columbia, Cornell clinched the Ivy League Championship for a second consecutive year. It was the first time in 50 years that any team other than Penn or Princeton had won consecutive Ivy League titles in basketball.

Exactly one year later on March 6, 2010, Donahue's Cornell team defeated the Brown Bears to clinch its third consecutive title and fourth in team history. This guaranteed an automatic bid for Cornell in the 2010 NCAA basketball tournament, in which Cornell was given a 12-seed in the East region. Cornell went on to win two games in the tournament, defeating 5-seed Temple and then 4-seed Wisconsin, both victories by double digit margins, to advance to the Sweet 16, the first Ivy League team to advance this far since 1979 (when Penn reached the Final Four). There they fell to the 1-seed Kentucky Wildcats, ending their historic run. This team featured several lauded seniors, including point guard Louis Dale, who finished as the third highest scorer and top assist man in Cornell history; center Jeff Foote, whose presence in the middle was essential to Cornell's success; and forward Ryan Wittman, who finished as the top scorer in Cornell men's basketball history (and the 5th highest scorer overall in Ivy League's men's basketball history) at 2,028 points.

Donahue received the Clair Bee Coach of the Year Award for his accomplishments during the 2009–10 season.

=== Boston College ===
On April 7, 2010, Boston College announced that Donahue had been hired as the head coach of its basketball program, replacing coach Al Skinner. Donahue led the Eagles to the second round of the NIT his first year. Donahue's second year was less successful, as the Eagles won only 9 games and lost to Harvard for the fourth year in a row. Donahue led the Eagles to a 16–17 season in his third year. Despite going 16–17, the Eagles lost to two top ten teams by one point.

On February 19, 2014, Donahue achieved what is considered his biggest win at BC by beating #1-ranked Syracuse on the road in the Carrier Dome, 62–59 in overtime. The upset was one of the few bright spots of Donahue's fourth and final year, which saw the Eagles finish with an 8–24 record.

On March 18, 2014, Boston College fired Donahue. He compiled a 54–76 record in four seasons and failed to reach the NCAA tournament.

=== Penn ===
On March 16, 2015, Donahue was named the 20th head coach in Penn basketball history, replacing Jerome Allen. Donahue served as an assistant coach for the Quakers from 1990 to 2000. Following Donahue's hiring as head coach, Mike Krzyzewski, Duke University and USA National Team head coach, stated, "Steve Donahue is a terrific basketball coach, and is even more impressive off the court," adding, "This is truly an outstanding hire by the University of Pennsylvania." Penn's 2017–18 team won the 2018 Ivy League tournament qualifying for their 1st NCAA Tournament since 2007. As the 16th seed for the Midwest bracket of the 2018 NCAA tournament, they played number 1 seed Kansas. The Quakers jumped out to a 21–11 lead with 8:01 left in the 1st half. However, the Jayhawks finished the half on a 22–5 run taking a 33–26 lead into half-time. The Jayhawks never trailed again and outscored the Quakers 43–34 in the 2nd half, causing the Quakers to lose 60–76.

On March 10, 2025, Donahue was fired after nine seasons at Penn. He compiled a 131–130 record with the program.

=== Saint Joseph's ===
On May 13, 2025, Donahue was hired by Saint Joseph's to be associate head coach under Billy Lange. On September 10, 2025, following Lange leaving the school to join the New York Knicks in a front office related role, Donahue was named the 16th head coach of the program. On February 28, 2026, Donahue registered the 350th victory of his college head coaching career when St. Joseph's defeated the University of Rhode Island 61-55. On March 11, 2026, Donahue was announced as the A-10 Coach of the Year after leading St. Joseph's to a 3rd place finish in the conference.

== Head coaching record ==
Record table
Season	Team	Overall	Conference	Standing	Postseason
Cornell Big Red (Ivy League) (2000–2010)
2000–01	Cornell	7–20	3–11	T–7th	
2001–02	Cornell	5–22	2–12	7th	
2002–03	Cornell	9–18	4–10	T–5th	
2003–04	Cornell	11–16	6–8	T–5th	
2004–05	Cornell	13–14	8–6	2nd	
2005–06	Cornell	13–15	8–6	3rd	
2006–07	Cornell	16–12	9–5	3rd	
2007–08	Cornell	22–6	14–0	1st	NCAA Division I first round
2008–09	Cornell	21–10	11–3	1st	NCAA Division I first round
2009–10	Cornell	29–5	13–1	1st	NCAA Division I Sweet 16
Cornell:		146–138 (.514)	78–62 (.557)		
Boston College Eagles (Atlantic Coast Conference) (2010–2014)
2010–11	Boston College	21–13	9–7	T–4th	NIT second round
2011–12	Boston College	9–22	4–12	T–9th	
2012–13	Boston College	16–17	7–11	8th	
2013–14	Boston College	8–24	4–14	13th	
Boston College:		54–76 (.415)	24–44 (.353)		
Penn Quakers (Ivy League) (2015–2025)
2015–16	Penn	11–17	5–9	5th	
2016–17	Penn	13–15	6–8	4th	
2017–18	Penn	24–9	12–2	T–1st	NCAA Division I first round
2018–19	Penn	19–12	7–7	T–4th	
2019–20	Penn	16–11	8–6	T–4th	
2021–22	Penn	12–16	9–5	3rd	
2022–23	Penn	17–13	9–5	3rd	
2023–24	Penn	11–18	3–11	7th	
2024–25	Penn	8–19	4–10	7th	
Penn:		131–130 (.502)	63–63 (.500)		
Saint Joseph's Hawks (Atlantic 10 Conference) (2025–present)
2025–26	Saint Joseph's	24–12	13–5	3rd	NIT Quarterfinals
2026–27	Saint Joseph's	4–0	0–0		
Saint Joseph's:		28–12 (.700)	13–5 (.722)		
Total:		359–356 (.502)			
National champion Postseason invitational champion Conference regular season champion Conference regular season and conference tournament champion Division regular season champion Division regular season and conference tournament champion Conference tournament champion
