= 2009–10 Cornell Big Red men's basketball team =

NCAA Division I college basketball season

2009–10 Cornell Big Red men's basketball

Ivy League Champions

NCAA tournament, Sweet Sixteen
- Conference: Ivy League

Ranking
- Coaches: No. 17
- Record: 29–5 (13–1 Ivy)
- Head coach: Steve Donahue (10th season)
- Assistant coaches: Nat Graham; Woody Kampmann; Kevin App
- Home arena: Newman Arena

2009–10 Ivy League men's basketball standings
	Conf.				Overall
Team	W		L	PCT	W		L	PCT
Cornell	13	–	1	.929	29	–	5	.853
Princeton	11	–	3	.786	22	–	9	.710
Harvard	10	–	4	.714	21	–	9	.700
Yale	6	–	8	.429	12	–	19	.387
Columbia	5	–	9	.357	11	–	17	.393
Brown	5	–	9	.357	11	–	20	.355
Penn	5	–	9	.357	6	–	22	.214
Dartmouth	1	–	13	.071	5	–	23	.179
As of March 21, 2010; Rankings from AP Poll

The 2009–10 Cornell Big Red men's basketball team represented Cornell University in the 2009–10 college basketball season. This was coach Steve Donahue's tenth season at Cornell. The Big Red competed in the Ivy League and played their home games at Newman Arena. They went 13–1 in Ivy League play to win the championship for the third year in a row and received the league's automatic bid to the 2010 NCAA Division I men's basketball tournament. They earned a 12 seed in the East Region. They upset 5 seed and AP #12 Temple in the first round for the first tournament win in school history. They continued their success by upsetting 4 seed and AP #16 Wisconsin to advance to their first Sweet Sixteen where they lost to 1 seed and AP #2 Kentucky to finish their season at 29–5.

The Cornell Big Red were the first Ivy League team to reach the Sweet Sixteen since the 1978–79 Penn Quakers and set an Ivy League record with 29 wins. The team is the only Cornell basketball team to finish the season ranked in the polls and the only team to defeat two ranked opponents in a season. During the season they were able to give number-one ranked Kansas a real challenge at Allen Fieldhouse where Kansas was unable to secure the lead for good until just 41 seconds remained.

== Roster ==
#	Name	Height	Weight (lbs.)	Position	Class	Hometown	Previous Team(s)
1	Jeff Foote	7'0"	265	C	Sr.	Lockwood, NY, U.S.	Spencer-Van Etten HS; St. Bonaventure
3	Chris Wroblewski	6'0"	180	G	So.	Highland Park, IL, U.S.	Highland Park, IL
4	Aaron Osgood	6'9"	230	F	Jr.	Overlake, WA, U.S.	The Hill School
5	Errick Peck	6'6"	215	F	Fr.	Indianapolis, IN, U.S.	Cathedral HS
11	Max Groebe	6'4"	200	G	Jr.	North Miami Beach, FL, U.S.	Dr. Michael M. Krop HS; UMass
12	Louis Dale	5'11"	180	G	Sr.	Birmingham, AL, U.S.	Altamont School
13	Andre Wilkins	6'5"	198	G	Jr.	Toronto, ON, Canada	Emery HS; Blinn
15	Geoff Reeves	6'4"	180	G	Sr.	Burlington, KS, U.S.	Burlington HS
20	Ryan Wittman	6'7"	215	F	Sr.	Eden Prairie, MN, U.S.	Eden Prairie HS
21	Peter McMillan	6'7"	220	F	Fr.	Brentwood, CA, U.S.	Northfield Mt. Hermon HS
22	Miles Asafo-Adjei	6'2"	170	G	Fr.	Antioch, TN, U.S.	The Ensworth School
23	Johnathan Gray	6'3"	175	G	Fr.	Tampa, FL, U.S.	Berkeley Prep
24	Adam Wire	6'5"	222	C	Jr.	Southern Pines, NC, U.S.	Pinecrest HS
25	Jon Jaques	6'7"	220	F	Sr.	Los Angeles, CA, U.S.	Harvard-Westlake School
33	Alex Tyler	6'7"	235	F/C	Sr.	Clear Spring, MD, U.S.	Mercersburg Academy
34	Josh Figini	6'9"	200	F	Fr.	Chisago Lakes, MN, U.S.	Chisago Lakes HS
40	Pete Reynolds	6'8"	220	F	Sr.	Blair, NE, U.S.	Blair HS
42	Mark Coury	6'9"	240	F/C	Sr.	West Bloomfield, MI, U.S.	Detroit Country Day School; Kentucky
55	Eitan Chemerinski	6'8"	195	F	Fr.	Potomac, MD, U.S.	Charles E. Smith Jewish Day School
	Anthony Gatlin	6'8"	180	F	Fr.	Pearland, TX, U.S.	Pearland HS; Centenary

== Schedule and results ==
- All times are Eastern

Date time, TV	Rank^{#}	Opponent^{#}	Result	Record	Site (attendance) city, state
Regular Season
11/14/2009*; 2:00pm		at Alabama	W 71–67	1–0	Coleman Coliseum (10,135); Tuscaloosa, AL
11/18/2009*; 7:30pm		at UMass; Legends Classic	W 74–61	2–0	Mullins Center (3,482); Amherst, MA
11/20/2009*; 7:00pm, TWCSN		Seton Hall	L 79–89	2–1	Newman Arena (4,473); Ithaca, NY
11/24/2009*; 7:00pm, ESPN360		at No. 10 Syracuse	L 73–88	2–2	Carrier Dome (18,238); Syracuse, NY
11/27/2009*; 2:00pm		vs. Toledo; Legends Classic	W 78–60	3–2	Daskalakis Athletic Center (NA); Philadelphia, PA
11/28/2009*; 2:00pm		vs. Vermont; Legends Classic	W 67–59	4–2	Daskalakis Athletic Center (NA); Philadelphia, PA
11/29/2009*; 2:30pm		at Drexel; Legends Classic	W 61–54	5–2	Daskalakis Athletic Center (1,033); Philadelphia, PA
12/2/2009*; 7:00pm		at Bucknell	W 104–98 ^{OT}	6–2	Sojka Pavilion (2,105); Lewisburg, PA
12/6/2009*; 2:00pm		Saint Joseph's	W 78–66	7–2	Newman Arena (3,132); Ithaca, NY
12/20/2009*; 12:00pm		vs. Davidson; Holiday Festival	W 91–88 ^{OT}	8–2	Madison Square Garden (5,780); New York, NY
12/21/2009*; 9:00pm		at St. John's; Holiday Festival	W 71–66	9–2	Madison Square Garden (5,210); New York, NY
12/29/2009*; 4:00pm		at La Salle	W 78–75	10–2	Tom Gola Arena (2,553); Philadelphia, PA
12/31/2009*; 2:00pm		Penn State Behrend	W 73–49	11–2	Newman Arena (2,218); Ithaca, NY
1/2/2010*; 2:00pm		Bryant	W 75–49	12–2	Newman Arena (1,962); Ithaca, NY
1/6/2010*; 8:00pm, ESPN360		at No. 1 Kansas	L 66–71	12–3	Allen Fieldhouse (16,300); Lawrence, KS
1/8/2010*; 8:30pm		at South Dakota	W 71–65	13–3	Vermillion, SD (2,116); DakotaDome
1/11/2010*; 7:00pm		Clarkson	W 82–37	14–3	Newman Arena (2,421); Ithaca, NY
1/16/2010; 4:00pm, TWCSN		Columbia	W 77–67	15–3 (1–0)	Newman Arena (4,132); Ithaca, NY
1/23/2010; 7:00pm		at Columbia	W 77–51	16–3 (2–0)	Levien Gymnasium (2,974); New York, NY
1/29/2010; 7:00pm		Dartmouth	W 71–37	17–3 (3–0)	Newman Arena (3,871); Ithaca, NY
1/30/2010; 7:00pm		Harvard	W 86–50	18–3 (4–0)	Newman Arena (4,473); Ithaca, NY
2/5/2010; 7:00pm		Yale	W 90–71	19–3 (5–0)	Newman Arena (4,255); Ithaca, NY
2/6/2010; 7:00pm		Brown	W 74–60	20–3 (6–0)	Newman Arena (4,014); Ithaca, NY
2/12/2010; 7:00pm		at Penn	L 64–79	20–4 (6–1)	Palestra (4,332); Philadelphia, PA
2/13/2010; 6:00pm		at Princeton	W 48–45	21–4 (7–1)	Jadwin Gymnasium (5,775); Princeton, NJ
2/19/2010; 7:00pm		at Harvard	W 79–70	22–4 (8–1)	Lavietes Pavilion (2,195); Cambridge, MA
2/20/2010; 7:00pm		at Dartmouth	W 88–70	23–4 (9–1)	Leede Arena (877); Hanover, NH
2/26/2010; 7:00pm		Princeton	W 50–47	24–4 (10–1)	Newman Arena (4,473); Ithaca, NY
2/27/2010; 7:00pm		Pennsylvania	W 68–48	25–4 (11–1)	Newman Arena (4,473); Ithaca, NY
3/5/2010; 7:00pm		at Brown	W 95–76	26–4 (12–1)	Pizzitola Sports Center (1,976); Providence, RI
3/6/2010; 7:00pm		at Yale	W 79–59	27–4 (13–1)	Payne Whitney Gymnasium (2,381); New Haven, CT
2010 NCAA Division I men's basketball tournament
3/19/2010*; 12:30pm, CBS	(12)	vs. (5) No. 12 Temple; First Round	W 78–63	28–4	Jacksonville Veterans Memorial Arena (10,657); Jacksonville, FL
3/21/2010*; 2:50pm, CBS	(12)	vs. (4) No. 16 Wisconsin; Second Round	W 87–69	29–4	Jacksonville Veterans Memorial Arena (12,547); Jacksonville, FL
3/25/2010*; 9:57pm, CBS	(12)	vs. (1) No. 2 Kentucky; Sweet Sixteen	L 45–62	29–5	Carrier Dome (22,271); Syracuse, NY
*Non-conference game. ^{#}Rankings from AP Poll. (#) Tournament seedings in parentheses.

== Rankings ==
Ranking movements Legend: ██ Increase in ranking ██ Decrease in ranking — = Not ranked RV = Received votes
	Week																			
Poll	Pre	1	2	3	4	5	6	7	8	9	10	11	12	13	14	15	16	17	18	Final
AP	—	RV	—	—	RV	RV	—	RV	RV	RV	RV	RV	RV	RV	RV	RV	RV	RV	RV	Not released
Coaches	RV	RV	—	RV	—	—	—	RV	RV	RV	RV	RV	25	22	RV	RV	RV	RV	17	

*AP does not release post-NCAA Tournament rankings
^Coaches did not release a Week 2 poll.

== Awards and honors ==
- Ryan Wittman – Ivy League Player of the Year, Honorable Mention AP All-American
