= 2009–10 Harvard Crimson men's basketball team =

American college basketball season

2009–10 Harvard Crimson men's basketball

2010 CollegeInsider.com Tournament, First Round
- Conference: Ivy League
- Record: 21–7 (10–4 Ivy League)
- Head coach: Tommy Amaker
- Assistant coaches: Kenny Blakeney; Brian DeStefano; Yanni Hufnagel
- Home arena: Lavietes Pavilion

2009–10 Ivy League men's basketball standings
	Conf.				Overall
Team	W		L	PCT	W		L	PCT
Cornell	13	–	1	.929	29	–	5	.853
Princeton	11	–	3	.786	22	–	9	.710
Harvard	10	–	4	.714	21	–	9	.700
Yale	6	–	8	.429	12	–	19	.387
Columbia	5	–	9	.357	11	–	17	.393
Brown	5	–	9	.357	11	–	20	.355
Penn	5	–	9	.357	6	–	22	.214
Dartmouth	1	–	13	.071	5	–	23	.179
As of March 21, 2010; Rankings from AP Poll

The 2009–10 Harvard Crimson men's basketball team represented Harvard University in the Ivy League athletic conference during the 2009-10 NCAA Division I men's basketball season. The team played its home games in Cambridge, Massachusetts at the Lavietes Pavilion, which has a capacity of 2,195. The team was led by third-year head coach Tommy Amaker and starred highly touted prospect Jeremy Lin.

Building on the success of the prior season when the 2008–09 team beat then ranked Boston College (#17 AP Poll/#24 Coaches' Poll) for the program's first win over a ranked team in the school's history, The 2009–10 team broke many all-time program records including the following:

- most wins (21)
- most non-conference wins (11)
- most home wins (11)
- most road/neutral wins (10)

The team received a vote in the AP Poll four times: (November 23, January 11, January 18 and 25). Amaker was a nominee for the inaugural Ben Jobe Award as the top minority Division I college basketball coach. Amaker was recognized by Fox Sports as the 2010 Ivy League Coach of the Year.

As a result of its 21–7 overall record and a 10–4 Ivy League conference record, the team was invited to play in the 16-team single-elimination 2010 CollegeInsider.com Tournament.

Over the course of the season, the team was highly publicized, with Lin being featured in Sports Illustrated and ESPN, while the team's early match against defending conference champion Cornell was written up in Time.

== Preseason ==
The Ivy League held its pre-season media day on October 28, 2009, in Princeton, New Jersey. The league's media unanimously voted Cornell the preseason #1 for the second straight season. Harvard was ranked fourth.

== Honors ==
Over the course of the season, the Ivy League office recognized several members of the team regularly for excellent play:

Week	Player of the week	Rookie of the week
November 16	Jeremy Lin, G, Harvard	Dee Giger, G, Harvard
December 7	Jeremy Lin, G, Harvard	
December 14	Jeremy Lin, G, Harvard	
January 4		Kyle Casey, F, Harvard
January 25		Kyle Casey, F, Harvard
February 8		Kyle Casey, F, Harvard
February 15	Kyle Casey, F, Harvard	Kyle Casey, F, Harvard
March 1	Jeremy Lin, G, Harvard	Brandyn Curry, G, Harvard
March 8		Brandyn Curry, G, Harvard

During the season, Lin was recognized as one of eleven finalists for the Bob Cousy Award. He was one of 31 midseason watchlist candidates for the Wooden Award. At the conclusion of the 2009–10 Ivy League men's basketball season, Lin was selected as a repeat first team All-Ivy selection after becoming the first player in Ivy League history to record 1,450 points (1,471), 450 rebounds (487), 400 assists (401) and 200 steals (224). He was also selected to the United States Basketball Writers Association All-District team.
