= Ken Bantum (basketball) =

American basketball player

Personal information
- Born: Roosevelt, New York, U.S.
- Listed height: 6 ft 7 in (2.01 m)
- Listed weight: 210 lb (95 kg)

Career information
- High school: Holy Trinity (Hicksville, New York)
- College: Cornell (1981–1985)
- NBA draft: 1985: 7th round, 142nd overall pick
- Drafted by: New York Knicks
- Position: Center

Career highlights
- Ivy League Player of the Year (1985); First-team All-Ivy League (1985); Second-team All-Ivy League (1984)
- Stats at Basketball Reference

Kenneth O. Bantum is an American former professional basketball player. He is a native of Roosevelt, New York, and graduated from Holy Trinity High School in Hicksville, New York. Bantum played college basketball for the Cornell Big Red from 1981 to 1985. He was the first Cornell player to be named the Ivy League Player of the Year when he won the award in 1985. Bantum set the Big Red all-time career scoring record with 1,411 points; he held the record until it was surpassed by John Bajusz in 1987. Bantum was named to the All-Ivy League first-team in 1985 and second-team in 1984.

Bantum was selected in the seventh round of the 1985 NBA draft by the New York Knicks and was the first Cornell player drafted into the NBA since 1968. He was also selected in the 1985 United States Basketball League draft by the Connecticut Skyhawks in the sixth round. Bantum joined the Indiana Pacers for rookie camp in 1986 but was cut from the team. Bantum played for Södertälje BBK in the Swedish Basketball League.

Bantum was inducted into the Cornell Athletics Hall of Fame in 1990. He was named in the Legends of Ivy League basketball by the Ivy League in 2023.
