= 2008–09 Ivy League men's basketball season =

- League: NCAA Division I
- Sport: Basketball
- Number of teams: 8

Regular Season
- League champions: Cornell
- Season MVP: Alex Barnett, Dartmouth

Basketball seasons
- ← 2007–08 2009–10 →

2008–09 Ivy League men's basketball standings
	Conf.				Overall
Team	W		L	PCT	W		L	PCT
Cornell	11	–	3	.786	21	–	10	.677
Princeton	8	–	6	.571	13	–	14	.481
Yale	8	–	6	.571	13	–	15	.464
Columbia	7	–	7	.500	12	–	16	.429
Dartmouth	7	–	7	.500	9	–	19	.321
Harvard	6	–	8	.429	14	–	14	.500
Penn	6	–	8	.429	10	–	18	.357
Brown	3	–	11	.214	9	–	19	.321
Rankings from AP Poll

The 2008–09 Ivy League men's basketball season was the Ivy League's 55th season of basketball. Cornell University won the league title for the second year in a row and was the recipient of the Ivy League's automatic bid to the 2009 NCAA Division I men's basketball tournament. Alex Barnett of Dartmouth College was the Ivy League Men's Basketball Player of the Year.

During the 2008–09 season, Harvard's Jeremy Lin was the only NCAA Division I men's college basketball player who ranked in the top ten in his conference for scoring (17.8), rebounding (5.5), assists (4.3), steals (2.4), blocked shots (0.6), field goal percentage (0.502), free throw percentage (0.744), and 3 point shot percentage (0.400).

== Results ==
Home\Away	Brown	Columbia	Cornell	Dartmouth	Harvard	Penn	Princeton	Yale
Brown		57–70	45–85	69–59	61–59	52–73	61–43	62–70
Columbia	65–59		59–71	65–52	60–59	50–51	58–44	53–42
Cornell	90–58	83–72		79–76	96–75	60–51	83–59	64–36
Dartmouth	63–61	67–53	57–75		62–63	63–60	66–63	62–74
Harvard	64–63	72–63	71–70	66–75		66–60	71–77	66–87
Penn	64–54	63–74	63–88	59–69	66–75		56–59	79–87
Princeton	56–48	63–35	41–64	59–54	58–55	55–62		62–54
Yale	57–55	57–49	72–60	74–62	59–69	63–68	60–48	

Host win
Guest win

== NCAA tournament ==
Team	Seed	Results
Cornell	14	Lost First Round vs #3 Missouri (box score)

== See also ==
- Ivy League
