= 2009–10 Princeton Tigers men's basketball team =

American college basketball season

2009–10 Princeton Tigers men's basketball

2010 College Basketball Invitational, Semifinals
- Conference: Ivy League
- Record: 22–9 (11–3, 2nd Ivy)
- Head coach: Sydney Johnson (3rd year)
- Captains: Nick Lake; Marcus Schroeder
- Home arena: Jadwin Gymnasium

2009–10 Ivy League men's basketball standings
| | Conf. | | | | Overall |
| Team | W | | L | PCT | W | | L | PCT |
|---|---|---|---|---|---|---|---|---|
| Cornell | 13 | – | 1 | .929 | 29 | – | 5 | .853 |
| Princeton | 11 | – | 3 | .786 | 22 | – | 9 | .710 |
| Harvard | 10 | – | 4 | .714 | 21 | – | 9 | .700 |
| Yale | 6 | – | 8 | .429 | 12 | – | 19 | .387 |
| Columbia | 5 | – | 9 | .357 | 11 | – | 17 | .393 |
| Brown | 5 | – | 9 | .357 | 11 | – | 20 | .355 |
| Penn | 5 | – | 9 | .357 | 6 | – | 22 | .214 |
| Dartmouth | 1 | – | 13 | .071 | 5 | – | 23 | .179 |
As of March 21, 2010; Rankings from AP Poll

The 2009–10 Princeton Tigers men's basketball team represented Princeton University in intercollegiate college basketball during the 2009–10 NCAA Division I men's basketball season. The head coach was Sydney Johnson and the team captains were Nick Lake and Marcus Schroeder. The team played its home games in the Jadwin Gymnasium on the University campus in Princeton, New Jersey, and was the runner-up of the Ivy League, which earned them an invitation to the 16-team 2010 College Basketball Invitational single-elimination tournament where they were advanced to the third round to play in the semifinals.

The team posted a 22–9 overall record and an 11–3 conference record. On January 6, 2010, against Marist Patrick Saunders had a perfect shooting night from the floor on eight field goals including five three-point shots. These field goal percentages are both listed in the Princeton record books as tied for the second best perfect performances. On January 24 against Goucher, the team established the school single-game record for steals with 20, surpassing the 17 set on five occasions between December 6, 1975, and January 28, 2002. In the March 17, opening-round game of the College Basketball Invitational tournament at home, Princeton defeated the Duquesne Dukes 65–51. The game was Princeton's first postseason appearance since the 2003–04 team went to the 2004 NCAA Division I men's basketball tournament and the first postseason victory since the 1998–99 team won two games in the 1999 National Invitation Tournament. On March 22, the team defeated IUPUI 74–68 in double overtime at IUPUI Gymnasium in Indianapolis, Indiana. The Tigers had previously won in the postseason in Indianapolis when the 1995–96 team pulled off a first-round upset of the national defending champion in the 1996 NCAA Division I men's basketball tournament. In the tournament semifinals the team was defeated by Saint Louis University 69–59 at Chaifetz Arena in St. Louis, Missouri, on March 24. Princeton led 25–22 with 7:25 remaining in the first half but fell behind by a 38–29 halftime score.

Head coach Johnson employs the Princeton offense. The prior season the only two schools who had lower scoring averages also ran the Princeton offense: Oregon State and Denver.

The team was led by second team All-Ivy League selections sophomore Douglas Davis and junior Dan Mavraides. It was the first time since 2004 that two Tigers had been on the first or second All-Ivy League teams. Using the Princeton offense, Princeton led the nation in scoring defense for the twentieth time since 1976. Following the season, Bill Bradley was awarded the Court of Honor Award from the National Association of Basketball Coaches.
