= Kareem Maddox =

American basketball player (born 1989)

Personal information
- Born: December 9, 1989 (age 36) Los Angeles, California, U.S.
- Listed height: 6 ft 8 in (2.03 m)
- Listed weight: 220 lb (100 kg)

Career information
- High school: Oak Park (Oak Park, California)
- College: Princeton (2007–2011)
- NBA draft: 2011: undrafted
- Playing career: 2011–2017
- Position: Power forward

Career history
- 2011–2012: Landstede Hammers
- 2012–2013: Newcastle Eagles
- 2016–2017: Miasto Szkła Krosno

Career highlights
- Ivy League Defensive Player of the Year (2011)
Medals
Men's 3x3 basketball
Representing the United States
FIBA 3x3 World Cup
Gold medal – first place	2019 Amsterdam	Team
Silver medal – second place	2023 Vienna	Team
Pan American Games
Gold medal – first place	2019 Lima	Team
Gold medal – first place	2023 Santiago	Team

Kareem Maddox (born December 9, 1989) is an American former professional basketball player and member of the United States men's national 3x3 team. He played college basketball at Princeton.

== College career ==
Maddox played college basketball at Princeton. During the 2010–11 season in his senior year he led the team in blocks with 52, ranked third in the Ivy League in blocked shots at 1.7 per game, fourth in defensive rebounds at 5.0 per game, and fourth in overall rebounds at 6.9 per game, and averaged 14.0 points per game. He became the second Princeton player to have 50 blocks in a season, following Chris Young in 2001, since blocks began being kept as a stat. He had seven 20-point games and was the first Tiger since 1984 to have two 30-point games in a season. He led his team to the Ivy League championship and the NCAA tournament for the first time since 2004 where they were defeated by Kentucky team 59–57 on a layup by Brandon Knight at the buzzer. During the NCAA tournament, Maddox recorded 12 points, four rebounds, three steals and two assists. Following the season he was named a unanimous first-team all-Ivy League and was named the Ivy League Defensive Player of the Year. He finished his career with 822 points, 456 rebounds and 108 blocks in 104 games.

== Professional career ==
=== Landstede Hammers ===
Maddox played professionally for the Landstede Hammers of the Dutch Basketball League (DBL) during the 2011–12 season. He averaged 10 points, five rebounds and 1.6 blocked shots in 23 minutes per game, before suffering an injury in January which ended his season.

=== Newcastle Eagles ===
On August 15, 2012, Maddox signed with the Newcastle Eagles of the British Basketball League (BBL) during the 2012–13 season. He was named the Molten BBL Player of the Month for the month of November 2012. During the month he averaged a double-double of 16 points and 10.6 rebounds. He also ranked in the top ten in the BBL for steals with 2.0 per game, and ranked second for blocked shots with 1.8 per game. He was again named the Molten BBL Player of the Month for the month of February 2013. During the month he averaged a double-double of 21.6 points and 13 rebounds per game. Defensively he recorded two blocked shots per game. Following an outstanding season with the Eagles, he was named to Molten Team of the Year, and Molten Defensive Team of the Year.

=== Miasto Szkła Krosno ===
After a three-year hiatus from basketball, Maddox joined Miasto Szkła Krosno of the Polish Basketball League (PLK) during the 2016–17 season.

== 3x3 career ==
Maddox joined the FIBA 3x3 World Tour in 2015. He represented the United States at the 2019 FIBA 3x3 World Cup where he averaged 3.4 points and a team-high 6.0 rebounds per game, to help lead Team USA to a perfect 7–0 record and a gold medal. He then competed at the 2019 Pan American Games, where he averaged 4.6 points per game, and helped Team USA win the inaugural 3x3 Pan Am Games tournament.

Maddox and team USA failed to qualify for the 3x3 tournament at the 2020 Summer Olympics, as they were eliminated by the Netherlands in the quarterfinals of the 2021 FIBA 3x3 Olympic Qualifying Tournament. At the 2023 FIBA 3x3 World Cup, he averaged 3.7 points and 2.9 rebounds per game and won a silver medal. He then competed at the 2023 Pan American Games and helped Team USA repeat as gold medal champions in the 3x3 tournament. During the gold medal game he scored four points in a 21–15 victory against Chile.

On March 27, 2024, he was named to team USA's roster to compete at the 2024 Summer Olympics.

== Personal life ==
Maddox graduated from Princeton University with a degree in English literature. Following his professional playing career in Europe, he volunteered at his local public radio station, KCRW, in Santa Monica, California. He then transitioned to being a producer for To the Point and All Things Considered. In October 2017 he became a podcast producer at Gimlet Media. He quit his podcast production job in January 2020 to pursue his dream of making the U.S. Olympic 3x3 basketball team.
