= Barton, New York =

Barton
- Town
- Location within state of New York
- Coordinates: 42°3′4″N 76°30′38″W
- Country: United States
- State: New York
- County: Tioga

Area
  - Total: 59.69 sq mi (154.59 km^{2})
  - Land: 59.27 sq mi (153.52 km^{2})
  - Water: 0.41 sq mi (1.07 km^{2})
- Elevation: 1,227 ft (374 m)

Population (2020)
  - Total: 8,570 ▼
  - Estimate (2021): 8,467
  - Density: 142.6/sq mi (55.07/km^{2})
- Time zone: UTC-5 (Eastern (EST))
  - Summer (DST): UTC-4 (EDT)
- ZIP code: 13734
- Area code: 607
- FIPS code: 36-04671
- GNIS feature ID: 0978712
- Website: townofbartonny.gov

Barton is a town in southwestern Tioga County, New York, United States. The population was 8,570 at the 2020 census. It is southeast of Elmira.

== History ==
The Sullivan Expedition of 1779 passed through this region. The first settlers arrived circa 1791.

The Town of Barton was established in 1824 from the town of Tioga. The region was already settled in 1796 when John Shepard bought 1,000 acres (4.0 km^{2}) by the current location of Waverly. It is reported that the town was named after Belva Ann Lockwood of Royalton, New York (near Lockport), one of the first female lawyers in the country, the first woman to argue a case before the Supreme Court and the first woman to be on an official ballot running for president of the US in 1884 and 1888. But, see the town's own webpage for a better explanation of the history of the town name.

One of the most interesting points in the town was the J.E. Rodeo Ranch." The 1940s and 1950s were also the heyday of Colonel Jim Eskew's famous J. E. Rodeo organization, the only rodeo ranch east of the Mississippi River. The rodeo traveled throughout the Mid Atlantic and New England states.

== Geography ==
According to the United States Census Bureau, the town has a total area of 59.7 square miles (155 km^{2}), of which 59.4 square miles (154 km^{2}) is land and 0.4 square miles (1.0 km^{2}) (0.62%) is water.

Part of the southern town line is the Susquehanna River and the remainder is the state line of Pennsylvania. The western town boundary is the border of Chemung County.

The Southern Tier Expressway (New York State Route 17) passes across the town next to the Susquehanna River. New York State Route 17C also follows the river, but on the north side. New York State Route 34 is a north-south highway that intersects NY-17C at Waverly.

== Demographics ==
Historical population
Census	Pop.	Note	%±
1830	972		—
1840	2,324		139.1%
1850	3,522		51.5%
1860	4,234		20.2%
1870	5,087		20.1%
1880	5,825		14.5%
1890	6,120		5.1%
1900	6,381		4.3%
1910	6,431		0.8%
1920	6,746		4.9%
1930	7,219		7.0%
1940	7,164		−0.8%
1950	8,017		11.9%
1960	8,365		4.3%
1970	8,526		1.9%
1980	8,784		3.0%
1990	8,925		1.6%
2000	9,066		1.6%
2010	8,858		−2.3%
2020	8,570		−3.3%
2021 (est.)	8,467		−1.2%
U.S. Decennial Census

As of the census of 2000, there were 9,066 people, 3,568 households, and 2,383 families residing in the town. The population density was 152.7 inhabitants per square mile (59.0/km^{2}). There were 3,927 housing units at an average density of 66.2 per square mile (25.6/km^{2}). The racial makeup of the town was 98.10% White, 0.39% African American, 0.25% Native American, 0.40% Asian, 0.15% from other races, and 0.71% from two or more races. Hispanic or Latino of any race were 1.03% of the population.

There were 3,568 households, out of which 33.0% had children under the age of 18 living with them, 50.3% were married couples living together, 12.1% had a female householder with no husband present, and 33.2% were non-families. 27.4% of all households were made up of individuals, and 12.4% had someone living alone who was 65 years of age or older. The average household size was 2.47 and the average family size was 3.00.

In the town, the population was spread out, with 26.0% under the age of 18, 7.4% from 18 to 24, 28.5% from 25 to 44, 21.9% from 45 to 64, and 16.2% who were 65 years of age or older. The median age was 38 years. For every 100 females, there were 91.1 males. For every 100 females age 18 and over, there were 86.7 males.

The median income for a household in the town was $33,530, and the median income for a family was $39,650. Males had a median income of $30,828 versus $23,351 for females. The per capita income for the town was $15,498. About 7.8% of families and 10.5% of the population were below the poverty line, including 12.2% of those under age 18 and 4.6% of those age 65 or over.

== Communities and locations in the Town of Barton ==
- Barton – The hamlet of Barton in the southeast part of the town is located on the north side of the Susquehanna River and NY-17C. The community has been referred to as "Barton City."
- East Waverly – A hamlet on the east side of Waverly.
- Ellistown - A hamlet on NY-17C east of Waverly on the north side of the Susquehanna River.
- Glencairn – A hamlet in the southeast part of the town on County Road 9.
- Halsey Valley – A hamlet on the town line in the northeast part of the town.
- Lockwood – A hamlet by the west town line on NY-34. It was formerly called "Bingham's Mills" from the names of early settlers. The present name is after Belva Ann Lockwood, a prominent suffragist who taught school for three years in nearby Owego.
- Lockwood Run – A stream at the west town line that flows through Waverly.
- North Barton – A hamlet centrally located in the north part of the town.
- North Waverly – A community adjacent to the north side of Waverly on NY-34.
- Reniff – A hamlet by the west town line on NY-34 north of Lockwood.
- Waverly – The Village of Waverly is in the southwest corner of the town on the border of Pennsylvania. It is north of Sayre, Pennsylvania.

It was Bingham's Mills first founded by Charles Bingham in the 1700. The name was changed by a local politician who had a falling out with the Bingham's. They had their own Mills, general store, Post Office, etc. that would be found in a small town.

== Notable residents ==
- Jeff Foote, professional basketball player
