= Dan Mavraides =

Dan Mavraides Nταν Μαυραειδής
Personal information
- Born: December 1, 1988 (age 37) Boston, Massachusetts, U.S.
- Listed height: 6 ft 4 in (1.93 m)
- Listed weight: 210 lb (95 kg)

Career information
- High school: Junípero Serra (San Mateo, California); Phillips Exeter Academy (Exeter, New Hampshire)
- College: Princeton (2007–2011)
- NBA draft: 2011: undrafted
- Playing career: 2011–2013
- Position: Point guard / shooting guard

Career history
- 2011–2012: Aris (Greece)
- 2012: Avellino (Italy)
- 2012–2013: Juvecaserta Basket (Italy)

Daniel James Mavraides (Greek: Nτάνιελ "Nταν" Τζέιμς Μαυραειδής; born December 1, 1988) is a Greek American professional basketball player. At a height of 6 ft 4 in (1.93 m) tall, he played as a point guard-shooting guard. Following his graduation from college, he played professionally in Italy and Greece for two seasons. Mavraides currently competes with the top-U.S. ranked Princeton 3×3 on the FIBA 3×3 World Tour.

== High school ==
Mavraides played high school basketball at Junípero Serra High School and Phillips Exeter Academy.

== College career ==
Mavraides played college basketball at Princeton University, with the Princeton Tigers, from 2007 to 2011. In the course of four seasons, Mavraides started 82 of his 97 games with Princeton averaging 10.9 points, 3.8 rebounds, and 1.5 assists per game.

== Professional career ==
Mavraides began his professional basketball career after signing a 3-year contract with the Greek Basket League club Aris Thessaloniki in 2011. In 2012, he signed with the Italian League club Avellino. On December 7, 2012, he signed with the Italian League club Juvecaserta Basket. The 2012–13 season was the last of his professional basketball playing career.

== Personal ==
Mavraides was born on December 1, 1988, in Boston, to John Mavraides and Dorothy Gallagher. He is of Greek American heritage.
