= Louis Dale =

American basketball player (born 1988)

Personal information
- Born: May 20, 1988 (age 38)
- Listed height: 5 ft 11 in (1.80 m)
- Listed weight: 180 lb (82 kg)

Career information
- High school: Altamont School (Birmingham, Alabama)
- College: Cornell (2006–2010)
- NBA draft: 2010: undrafted
- Playing career: 2010–2013
- Position: Point guard

Career history
- 2010–2012: BG Göttingen
- 2012–2013: K.A.O.D. B.C.

Career highlights
- Ivy League Player of the Year (2008); 3× First-team All-Ivy League (2008–2010)

Louis Dale III (born May 20, 1988) is an American former professional basketball player. He played college basketball at Cornell.

== High school career ==
Dale attended the Altamont School in Birmingham, Alabama, where he played basketball and ran track. As a senior, he averaged 16 points, six rebounds, and five assists per game. He was a McDonald's All-American nominee. Dale committed to play college basketball at Cornell in April 2006.

== College career ==
Dale averaged 13.3 points and 4.3 rebounds per game as a freshman. He was named Honorable Mention All-Ivy League. As a sophomore, Dale averaged 13.7 points, 4.9 assists and 4.4 rebounds per game. He was named Ivy League Player of the Year. Dale missed the first eight games of his junior season with a hamstring injury. He averaged 13 points and 4.2 rebounds per game. He went on a running program in the offseason to build stamina. As a senior, Dale averaged 12.8 points, 4.7 assists, and 2.9 rebounds per game, shooting 47 percent from the floor. He earned his third consecutive First Team All-Ivy League honors. Dale helped Cornell reach the Sweet Sixteen of the NCAA Tournament, scoring a career-high 26 points in the 87–69 win over Wisconsin. He finished his career as one of five Ivy League players to score 1,300 points, pull down 400 rebounds, dish out 400 assists, and have 100 steals.

== See also ==
- Cornell Big Red men's basketball statistical leaders

== Professional career ==
In July 2010, Dale signed with BG Göttingen of the German Basketball Bundesliga. During the 2011–12 season, he averaged 11.9 points per game in nine games, but tore his ACL and missed the rest of the season. On August 31, 2012, Dale signed with K.A.O.D. B.C. of the Greek Basket League.

After his playing career, Dale was a graduate assistant coach for the Boston College women’s basketball team. He received his MBA and found a job as an investment analyst for Aberdeen Standard Investments.
