= Ryan Wittman =

American basketball coach (born 1987)

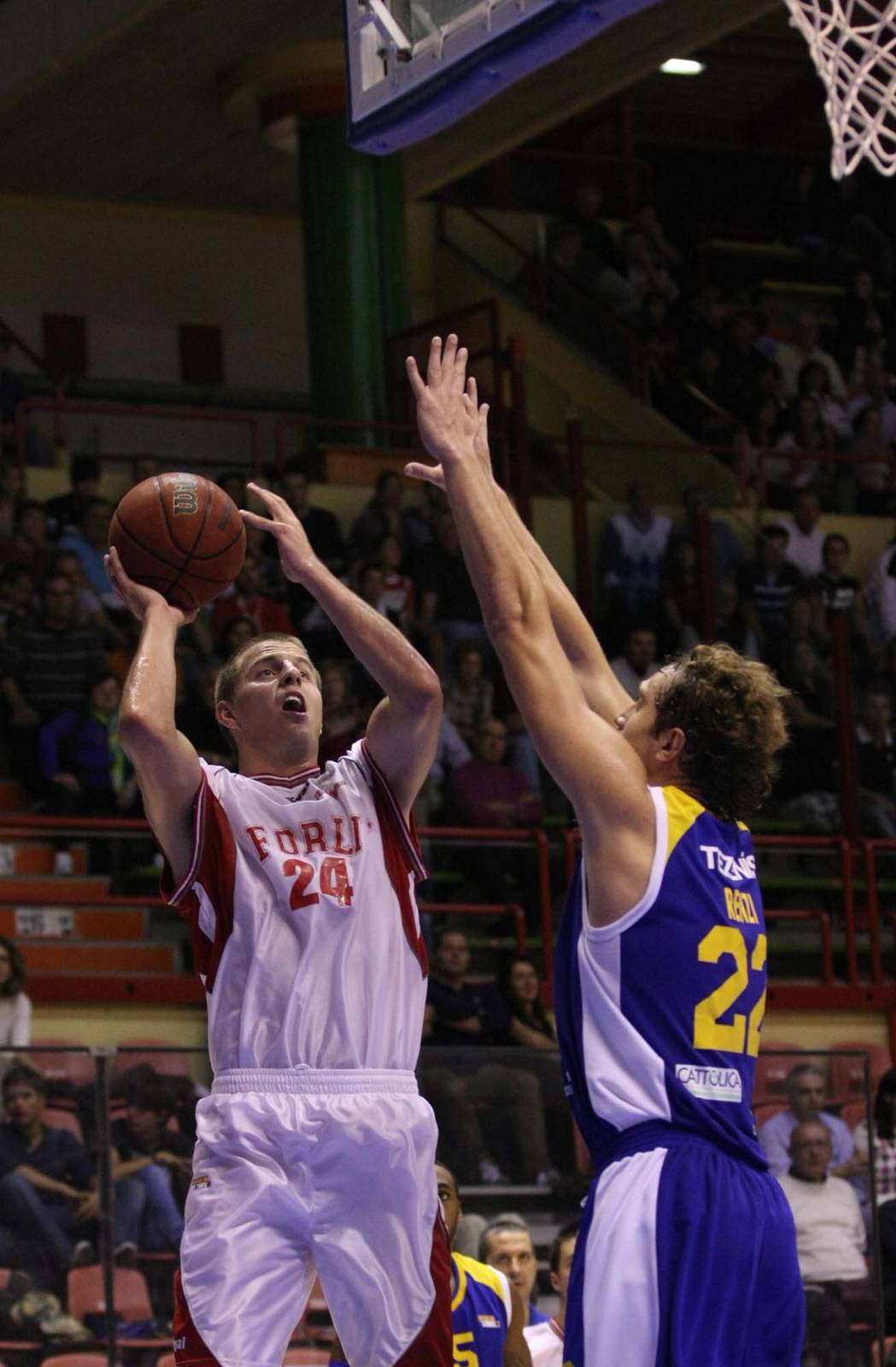

Personal information
- Born: October 26, 1987 (age 39) Atlanta, Georgia, U.S.
- Listed height: 6 ft 6 in (1.98 m)
- Listed weight: 215 lb (98 kg)

Career information
- High school: Eden Prairie (Eden Prairie, Minnesota)
- College: Cornell (2006–2010)
- NBA draft: 2010: undrafted
- Playing career: 2010–2011
- Position: Small forward

Career history
- 2010: Fulgor Libertas Forlì
- 2010–2011: Fort Wayne Mad Ants
- 2011: Stelmet ZG

Career highlights
- AP honorable mention All-American (2010); Ivy League Player of the Year (2010)

Ryan Scott Wittman (born October 26, 1987) is an American former basketball player, best known for his college career at Cornell University. As of 2024, he holds the record for the most three-point field goals in men's Ivy League history.

== Early life ==
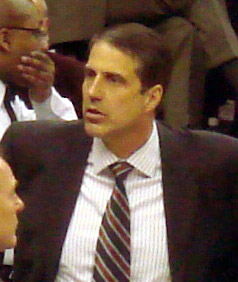
Ryan Wittman is the son of Randy Wittman.

Wittman was born on October 26, 1987, in Atlanta, Georgia. He is the son of Kathy and Randy Wittman and he has one sister, Lauren. Randy Wittman was formerly the head coach of the Washington Wizards and was previously head coach of the Cleveland Cavaliers (1999–2001) and Minnesota Timberwolves (2007–2008). The elder Wittman was a player on the 1980–81 Indiana Hoosiers men's basketball team which won a championship under Bob Knight. Drafted 22nd overall in the 1983 NBA draft, Wittman played for NBA teams Atlanta Hawks, Sacramento Kings, and Indiana Pacers for nine seasons.

Ryan was born when his father was a member of the Atlanta Hawks, but grew up in Eden Prairie, Minnesota and occasionally played pick-up games with Kevin Garnett at the Target Center. Wittman attended Eden Prairie High School, where he posted an average of 11.5 points per game in his junior year. He was named one of the preseason Top 30 players in Minnesota for the Class of 2006 by GopherIllustrated.com.

In July 2005, Wittman played for the AAU team Minnesota Select. The team was 5–1 in the Las Vegas Classic, an AAU playoff tournament. He led Select scorers with 15 points in a quarterfinal loss to the Houston Hoops, 59–53. Their season record was 27–14.

As a senior, his points per game average exploded to 20.5, and he hit 50 percent of his shots from three-point range and 84 percent from the foul line. One of the highlights of that season was upsetting Braham High School on December 30, 2005, who had a 65-game unbeaten streak snapped by the 80–67 loss to the Eagles. Wittman scored 30 points in that contest, including five-of-six from beyond the arc. After the season was over, Wittman was one of the five finalists for Minnesota Mr. Basketball and was listed as the sixth best Minnesota high school player by GopherIllustrated.com. In addition to being selected onto the First Team All Metro, he was a First Team All-State selection by the Timberwolves and a Second Team All-State selection by the St. Paul Pioneer Press.

He was recruited by Air Force, Bradley, Cornell, Eastern Kentucky, and Indiana. Cornell, which had recruited Wittman since his junior year in high school, was unable to offer him an athletic scholarship due to Ivy League rules. Nonetheless, Wittman inked his letter of intent to the Big Red on December 31, 2005.

College recruiting
Name	Hometown	School	Height	Weight	Commit date
Ryan Wittman; Small forward	Eden Prairie, Minnesota	Eden Prairie (MN)	6 ft 6 in (1.98 m)	190 lb (86 kg)	Dec 31, 2005
Ryan Wittman; Small forward	Recruit ratings: No ratings found				
Overall recruit ranking: Scout: N/A Rivals: N/A
Note: In many cases, Scout, Rivals, 247Sports, On3, and ESPN may conflict in their listings of height and weight.; In these cases, the average was taken. ESPN grades are on a 100-point scale.; Sources: "Cornell Basketball Commitments". Rivals.; "2006 Cornell Basketball Commits". Scout.; "ESPN". ESPN.; "Scout.com Team Recruiting Rankings". Scout.; "2006 Team Ranking". Rivals.

== College career ==
In Wittman's first collegiate game, he broke the Cornell record for most points in a freshman collegiate opener with 18 points, also finishing with three rebounds and two assists. That game, a 64–61 road win against Northwestern, was Cornell's first victory against a Big Ten school in 39 years. At Cornell, Wittman was a member of the Quill and Dagger society. As of 2024, he holds the record for the most three-point field goals in men's Ivy League history.

== Professional career ==
He played in four games for the Celtics in the Orlando Summer League and then three games for the New York Knicks in the NBA Summer League.

In the 2010 season, he played six months in Italy for the Fulgor Libertas Forlì, then he went in D-League at the Fort Wayne Mad Ants.

In the 2011 season he played for the Zastal Zielona Góra.

== Statistics ==
=== NCAA ===
College statistics

Legend
GP	Games played	GS	Games started	MPG	Minutes per game
FG%	Field goal percentage	3P%	3-point field goal percentage	FT%	Free throw percentage
RPG	Rebounds per game	APG	Assists per game	SPG	Steals per game
BPG	Blocks per game	PPG	Points per game	**Bold**	Career high

Year	Team	GP	GS	MPG	FG%	3P%	FT%	RPG	APG	SPG	BPG	PPG
2006–07	Cornell Big Red	28	27	**35.4**	.438	.431	**.887**	2.8	1.3	1.0	0.3	15.6
2007–08	Cornell Big Red	28	28	33.7	.465	**.459**	.867	**4.2**	1.5	1.0	0.1	15.1
2008–09	Cornell Big Red	31	30	34.1	.452	.416	.818	3.6	**2.6**	0.9	0.2	**18.5**
2009–10	Cornell Big Red	**34**	**33**	33.9	**.474**	.426	.826	4.0	1.8	**1.1**	**0.4**	17.5
