= Jeff Foote =

American basketball player (born 1987)

Personal information
- Born: July 14, 1987 (age 39) Lockwood, New York, U.S.
- Listed height: 7 ft 0 in (2.13 m)
- Listed weight: 265 lb (120 kg)

Career information
- High school: Spencer-Van Etten (Spencer, New York)
- College: Cornell (2007–2010)
- NBA draft: 2010: undrafted
- Playing career: 2010–2014
- Position: Center
- Number: 54

Career history
- 2010–2011: Maccabi Tel Aviv
- 2010–2011: →Melila Baloncesto
- 2011–2012: Springfield Armor
- 2012: New Orleans Hornets
- 2012–2013: Žalgiris Kaunas
- 2013–2014: Springfield Armor

Career highlights
- NBA D-League All-Star (2012); All-NBA D-League Second Team (2012); LKL All-Star (2013); LKL Champion (2013)
- Stats at NBA.com
- Stats at Basketball Reference

Jeffrey Bernard Foote (born July 14, 1987) is an American former professional basketball player.

== College career ==
Foote began his college basketball career at St. Bonaventure University. He redshirted his freshman season before he transferred to Cornell University for his last three seasons.

== Professional career ==
In June 2010, Foote signed a three-year contract with Euroleague giants Maccabi Tel Aviv. In November 2010 he was sent on a one-year loan to Spanish second division team Melilla Baloncesto. In August 2011 he signed a one-year contract with Zastal Zielona Góra. Foote left Zastal before the season started and in December 2011 signed with the Springfield Armor of the NBA Development League. After the resolution of the 2011 NBA lockout, Foote was invited to the Portland Trail Blazers training camp in December 2011, but did not make the team and returned to the Armor.

On March 8, 2012, Foote was called up to the NBA by the New Orleans Hornets. In his first game for the Hornets on March 9 Foote scored four points and had four rebounds. He would appear in three more games that season but would not score another point.

On September 7, 2012, Foote signed with the Lithuanian club Žalgiris Kaunas.

On November 1, 2013, he was re-acquired by the Springfield Armor.

== Personal ==
Foote graduated from the College of Agriculture and Life Sciences at Cornell University. He is the son of Don and Wanda Foote. Don played basketball at Niagara University from 1976 to 1979. Foote's older brother, Jesse, played basketball for Rochester Institute of Technology from 2001 to 2005 and holds RIT's record for career blocked shots.

As of 2014, Foote was enrolled at the University of Miami School of Law and worked as a graduate assistant for the basketball team under Head Coach Jim Larranaga.

== Career statistics ==
Legend
GP	Games played	GS	Games started	MPG	Minutes per game
FG%	Field goal percentage	3P%	3-point field goal percentage	FT%	Free throw percentage
RPG	Rebounds per game	APG	Assists per game	SPG	Steals per game
BPG	Blocks per game	PPG	Points per game	**Bold**	Career high

=== NBA ===
Year	Team	GP	GS	MPG	FG%	3P%	FT%	RPG	APG	SPG	BPG	PPG
2011–12	New Orleans	4	0	9.8	.333	–	–	1.5	.0	.0	.3	1.0
Career		4	0	9.8	.333	–	–	1.5	.0	.0	.3	1.0

== Awards and accomplishments ==
=== College career ===
- All-Ivy First-Team (2010)
- 2x All-Ivy Second-Team (2008, 2009)
- 2x Ivy League Defensive Player of the Year (2009, 2010)
