= Penn Quakers men's basketball statistical leaders =

The Penn Quakers men's basketball statistical leaders are individual statistical leaders of the Penn Quakers men's basketball program in various categories, including points, assists, blocks, rebounds, and steals. Within those areas, the lists identify single-game, single-season, and career leaders. The Quakers represent the University of Pennsylvania in the NCAA's Ivy League.

Penn began competing in intercollegiate basketball in 1896. However, the school's record book does not generally list records from before the 1950s, as records from before this period are often incomplete and inconsistent. Since scoring was much lower in this era, and teams played much fewer games during a typical season, it is likely that few or no players from this era would appear on these lists anyway.

The NCAA did not officially record assists as a stat until the 1983–84 season, and blocks and steals until the 1985–86 season, but Penn's record books includes players in these stats before these seasons. These lists are updated through the end of the 2019–20 season.

== Scoring ==
Career
Rk	Player	Points	Seasons
1	A. J. Brodeur	1,832	2016–17 2017–18 2018–19 2019–20
2	Ernie Beck	1,827	1950–51 1951–52 1952–53
3	Ugonna Onyekwe	1,762	1999–00 2000–01 2001–02 2002–03
4	Zack Rosen	1,723	2008–09 2009–10 2010–11 2011–12
5	Keven McDonald	1,644	1975–76 1976–77 1977–78
6	Michael Jordan	1,604	1996–97 1997–98 1998–99 1999–00
7	Ron Haigler	1,552	1972–73 1973–74 1974–75
8	Jordan Dingle	1,537	2019–20 2021–22 2022–23
9	Ibrahim Jaaber	1,518	2003–04 2004–05 2005–06 2006–07
10	Stan Pawlak	1,501	1963–64 1964–65 1965–66

Season
Rk	Player	Points	Season
1	Ernie Beck	673	1952–53
2	Jordan Dingle	656	2022–23
3	Tony Price	633	1978–79
4	Keven McDonald	623	1977–78
5	Ron Haigler	605	1974–75
6	Zack Rosen	602	2011–12
7	Ernie Beck	596	1951–52
8	Stan Pawlak	579	1965–66
9	Mark Zoller	565	2006–07
10	Ugonna Onyekwe	560	2001–02

Single game
Rk	Player	Points	Season	Opponent
1	Ernie Beck	47	1952–53	Duke
2	Ernie Beck	45	1951–52	Harvard
3	Hassan Duncombe	44	1989–90	Navy
	TJ Power	44	2025–26	Yale
5	Sam Brown	42	2024–25	Columbia
6	TJ Power	38	2025–26	Dartmouth
7	Jordan Dingle	37	2022–23	La Salle
	Matt Maloney	37	1992–93	American
	Hassan Duncombe	37	1989–90	Colgate
	Keven McDonald	37	1977–78	St. Bonaventure
	Stan Pawlak	37	1965–66	La Salle

== Rebounds ==
Career
Rk	Player	Rebounds	Seasons
1	Ernie Beck	1,557	1950–51 1951–52 1952–53
2	Barton Leach	1,028	1952–53 1953–54 1954–55
3	A. J. Brodeur	928	2016–17 2017–18 2018–19 2019–20
4	Joseph Sturgis	924	1953–54 1954–55 1955–56
5	Richard Censits	867	1955–56 1956–57 1957–58
6	Ron Haigler	856	1972–73 1973–74 1974–75
7	Dick Heylmun	848	1951–52 1952–53 1953–54
8	Bruce Lefkowitz	766	1983–84 1984–85 1985–86 1986–87
9	Ugonna Onyekwe	759	1999–00 2000–01 2001–02 2002–03
10	Mark Zoller	750	2003–04 2004–05 2005–06 2006–07

Season
Rk	Player	Rebounds	Season
1	Ernie Beck	556	1950–51
2	Ernie Beck	551	1951–52
3	Barton Leach	450	1954–55
	Ernie Beck	450	1952–53
5	Joseph Sturgis	371	1955–56
6	Dick Heylmun	348	1951–52
7	Richard Censits	317	1957–58
8	Barton Leach	312	1952–53
9	Joseph Sturgis	309	1954–55
10	Richard Censits	305	1956–57

Single game
Rk	Player	Rebounds	Season	Opponent
1	Barton Leach	32	1954–55	Harvard
2	Barton Leach	28	1954–55	Syracuse
3	Frank Burgess	27	1966–67	La Salle
	Barton Leach	27	1954–55	Brown
	Barton Leach	27	1954–55	Army
6	Joseph Sturgis	25	1953–54	Yale
7	Ernie Beck	24	1951–52	Swarthmore

== Assists ==
Career
Rk	Player	Assists	Seasons
1	Zack Rosen	588	2008–09 2009–10 2010–11 2011–12
2	Jerome Allen	505	1991–92 1992–93 1993–94 1994–95
3	Michael Jordan	469	1996–97 1997–98 1998–99 1999–00
4	Tim Begley	427	2001–02 2002–03 2003–04 2004–05
5	Paul Chambers	396	1988–89 1989–90 1990–91 1991–92
6	A. J. Brodeur	390	2016–17 2017–18 2018–19 2019–20
7	David Klatsky	387	1999–00 2000–01 2001–02 2002–03
8	Miles Cartwright	358	2010–11 2011–12 2012–13 2013–14
9	Matt Maloney	322	1992–93 1993–94 1994–95
10	Ibrahim Jaaber	321	2003–04 2004–05 2005–06 2006–07

Season
Rk	Player	Assists	Season
1	Zack Rosen	173	2011–12
2	Ibrahim Jaaber	162	2006–07
	David Klatsky	162	2000–01
4	Jerome Allen	160	1994–95
5	Zack Rosen	152	2010–11
6	Paul Chambers	151	1991–92
7	Ira Bowman	142	1995–96
8	Michael Jordan	141	1999–00
9	A. J. Brodeur	140	2019–20
10	Zack Rosen	139	2008–09

Single game
Rk	Player	Assists	Season	Opponent
1	Tony Hicks	13	2014–15	Lafayette
	Zack Rosen	13	2010–11	Harvard
	Tim Begley	13	2004–05	Lafayette
	Dave Wohl	13	1969–70	Brown
5	Zack Rosen	12	2011–12	Marist
	Harrison Gaines	12	2007–08	The Citadel
	Paul Chambers	12	1991–92	Columbia
	John Wilson	12	1985–86	Princeton
	John Wilson	12	1985–86	Bowling Green
	Dave Wohl	12	1970–71	Harvard
	Dave Wohl	12	1970–71	Syracuse
	Francis Mulroy	12	1954–55	Cornell

== Steals ==
Career
Rk	Player	Steals	Seasons
1	Ibrahim Jaaber	303	2003–04 2004–05 2005–06 2006–07
2	Jerome Allen	166	1991–92 1992–93 1993–94 1994–95
3	Matt Maloney	157	1992–93 1993–94 1994–95
4	Zack Rosen	154	2008–09 2009–10 2010–11 2011–12
5	Michael Jordan	147	1996–97 1997–98 1998–99 1999–00
6	Mark Zoller	141	2003–04 2004–05 2005–06 2006–07
7	Paul Chambers	134	1988–89 1989–90 1990–91 1991–92
	Shawn Trice	134	1991–92 1992–93 1993–94 1994–95
9	Tyler Bernardini	132	2007–08 2008–09 2009–10 2010–11 2011–12
10	Miles Cartwright	131	2010–11 2011–12 2012–13 2013–14

Season
Rk	Player	Steals	Season
1	Ibrahim Jaaber	96	2005–06
2	Ibrahim Jaaber	90	2006–07
3	Ibrahim Jaaber	85	2004–05
4	Matt Maloney	62	1993–94
5	Rob Belcore	58	2011–12
6	Ira Bowman	57	1995–96
	Anthony Arnolie	57	1983–84
8	Ira Bowman	56	1994–95
9	Mark Zoller	55	2006–07
	AJ Levine	55	2025–26

Single game
Rk	Player	Steals	Season	Opponent
1	Ibrahim Jaaber	9	2004–05	Dartmouth
2	Ira Bowman	8	1994–95	Dartmouth
	John Wilson	8	1986–87	Cornell
	Ken Hall	8	1980–81	Dartmouth

== Blocks ==
Career
Rk	Player	Blocks	Seasons
1	A. J. Brodeur	196	2016–17 2017–18 2018–19 2019–20
2	Geoff Owens	195	1996–97 1998–99 1999–00 2000–01
3	Ugonna Onyekwe	139	1999–00 2000–01 2001–02 2002–03
4	Tim Krug	138	1992–93 1993–94 1994–95 1995–96
5	Hassan Duncombe	127	1987–88 1988–89 1989–90
6	Darien Nelson-Henry	101	2012–13 2013–14 2014–15 2015–16
7	Steve Danley	86	2003–04 2004–05 2005–06 2006–07
8	Jack Eggleston	75	2007–08 2008–09 2009–10 2010–11
9	Nick Spinoso	70	2021–22 2022–23 2023–24 2024–25
10	Eric Moore	66	1991–92 1992–93 1993–94 1994–95

Season
Rk	Player	Blocks	Season
1	A. J. Brodeur	66	2016–17
2	Geoff Owens	58	1998–99
3	Geoff Owens	54	1999–00
4	Hassan Duncombe	51	1988–89
5	A. J. Brodeur	48	2019–20
	Tim Krug	48	1995–96
7	Ugonna Onyekwe	47	1999–00
8	Geoff Owens	43	2000–01
9	A. J. Brodeur	41	2018–19
	A. J. Brodeur	41	2017–18
	Ugonna Onyekwe	41	2001–02

Single game
Rk	Player	Blocks	Season	Opponent
1	Tim Krug	7	1995–96	Columbia
2	A. J. Brodeur	6	2016–17	Brown
	Tim Krug	6	1995–96	Brown
	Geoff Owens	6	1996–97	Brown
	Geoff Owens	6	1999–00	Brown
