= 2002–03 Penn Quakers men's basketball team =

American college basketball season

2002–03 Penn Quakers men's basketball

Ivy League champions

NCAA tournament, first round
- Conference: Ivy League
- Record: 22–6 (14–0 Ivy)
- Head coach: Fran Dunphy (14th season)
- Assistant coach: Dave Duke
- Home arena: The Palestra

2002–03 Ivy League men's basketball standings
	Conf.				Overall
Team	W		L	PCT	W		L	PCT
Penn	14	–	0	1.000	22	–	6	.786
Brown	12	–	2	.857	17	–	12	.586
Princeton	10	–	4	.714	16	–	11	.593
Yale	8	–	6	.571	14	–	13	.519
Harvard	4	–	10	.286	12	–	15	.444
Cornell	4	–	10	.286	9	–	18	.333
Dartmouth	4	–	10	.286	8	–	19	.296
Columbia	0	–	14	.000	2	–	25	.074
Rankings from AP Poll

The 2002–03 Penn Quakers men's basketball team represented the University of Pennsylvania during the 2002–03 NCAA Division I men's basketball season. The Quakers, led by 14th-year head coach Fran Dunphy, played their home games at The Palestra as members of the Ivy League. They finished the season 22–6, 14–0 in Ivy League play to win the regular season championship. They received the Ivy League's automatic bid to the NCAA tournament where they lost in the First Round to Oklahoma State.

== Roster ==
2002–03 Penn Quakers men's basketball team
Players
Coaches

Pos.	#	Name	Height	Weight	Year	Previous school	Hometown
F	1	Ugonna Onyekwe	6 ft 8 in (2.03 m)	215 lb (98 kg)	Sr	Mercersburg Academy	Lagos, Nigeria
G	31	Tim Begley	6 ft 6 in (1.98 m)	230 lb (104 kg)	So	Christian Brothers Academy	Freehold Township, New Jersey

Head coach

- Fran Dunphy (Ursinus)

Assistant coach(es)

- Dave Duke (Villanova)

Legend

- (C) Team captain
- (S) Suspended
- (I) Ineligible
- (W) Walk-on
- Injured
- Current redshirt

Roster

== Schedule and results ==
Date time, TV	Rank^{#}	Opponent^{#}	Result	Record	Site (attendance) city, state
Regular season
Nov 23, 2002*		Penn State	W 62–37	1–0	The Palestra; Philadelphia, Pennsylvania
Nov 25, 2002*		Drexel	L 62–71	1–1	The Palestra; Philadelphia, Pennsylvania
Dec 3, 2002*		at Delaware	L 59–60	1–2	Bob Carpenter Center; Newark, Delaware
Dec 7, 2002*		Temple	W 71–46	2–2	The Palestra; Philadelphia, Pennsylvania
Dec 10, 2002*		at Villanova	W 72–58	3–2	First Union Center; Philadelphia, Pennsylvania
Dec 30, 2002*		at Providence	L 71–74 ^{OT}	3–3	Dunkin Donuts Center; Providence, Rhode Island
Jan 4, 2003*		at Colorado	L 57–80	3–4	Coors Events Center; Boulder, Colorado
Jan 8, 2003*		American	W 66–55	4–4	The Palestra; Philadelphia, Pennsylvania
Jan 11, 2003*		at USC	W 99–61	5–4	L.A. Sports Arena; Los Angeles, California
Jan 18, 2003*		vs. Monmouth	W 98–54	6–4	Asbury Park Convention Hall; Asbury Park, New Jersey
Jan 21, 2003*		at Lafayette	W 76–66	7–4	Kirby Sports Center; Easton, Pennsylvania
Jan 25, 2003*		Saint Joseph's	L 48–66	7–5	The Palestra; Philadelphia, Pennsylvania
Jan 28, 2003*		La Salle	W 79–66	8–5	The Palestra; Philadelphia, Pennsylvania
Jan 31, 2003		Dartmouth	W 73–50	9–5 (1–0)	The Palestra; Philadelphia, Pennsylvania
Feb 1, 2003		Harvard	W 75–59	10–5 (2–0)	The Palestra; Philadelphia, Pennsylvania
Feb 7, 2003		at Cornell	W 70–67	11–5 (3–0)	Newman Arena; Ithaca, New York
Feb 8, 2003		at Columbia	W 47–40	12–5 (4–0)	Levien Gymnasium; New York, New York
Feb 11, 2003		Princeton	W 65–55	13–5 (5–0)	The Palestra; Philadelphia, Pennsylvania
Feb 14, 2003		Yale	W 68–57	14–5 (6–0)	The Palestra; Philadelphia, Pennsylvania
Feb 15, 2003		Brown	W 73–66	15–5 (7–0)	The Palestra; Philadelphia, Pennsylvania
Feb 21, 2003		at Harvard	W 82–66	16–5 (8–0)	Lavietes Pavilion; Boston, Massachusetts
Feb 22, 2003		at Dartmouth	W 67–52	17–5 (9–0)	Leede Arena; Hanover, New Hampshire
Feb 28, 2003		at Brown	W 69–65	18–5 (10–0)	Pizzitola Sports Center; Providence, Rhode Island
Mar 1, 2003		at Yale	W 80–75	19–5 (11–0)	John J. Lee Amphitheater; New Haven, Connecticut
Mar 7, 2003		Columbia	W 63–39	20–5 (12–0)	The Palestra; Philadelphia, Pennsylvania
Mar 8, 2003		Cornell	W 69–52	21–5 (13–0)	The Palestra; Philadelphia, Pennsylvania
Mar 11, 2003		at Princeton	W 74–67	22–5 (14–0)	Jadwin Gymnasium; Princeton, New Jersey
NCAA tournament
Mar 21, 2003*	(11 E)	vs. (6 E) Oklahoma State; First round	L 63–77	22–6	TD Garden; Boston, Massachusetts
*Non-conference game. ^{#}Rankings from AP Poll. (#) Tournament seedings in parentheses. E=East. All times are in Eastern Time.

== Awards and honors ==
- Ugonna Onyekwe – Ivy League Player of the Year (2x)
- Tim Begley – Honorable Mention All-Ivy League
