= 2004–05 Penn Quakers men's basketball team =

American college basketball season

2004–05 Penn Quakers men's basketball

Ivy League champions

NCAA tournament, first round
- Conference: Ivy League
- Record: 20–9 (13–1 Ivy)
- Head coach: Fran Dunphy (16th season)
- Assistant coaches: Gil Jackson; Dave Duke; Matt Langel
- Home arena: The Palestra

2004–05 Ivy League men's basketball standings
	Conf.				Overall
Team	W		L	PCT	W		L	PCT
Penn	13	–	1	.929	20	–	9	.690
Cornell	8	–	6	.571	13	–	14	.481
Harvard	7	–	7	.500	12	–	15	.444
Yale	7	–	7	.500	11	–	16	.407
Dartmouth	7	–	7	.500	10	–	17	.370
Princeton	6	–	8	.429	15	–	13	.536
Brown	5	–	9	.357	12	–	16	.429
Columbia	3	–	11	.214	12	–	15	.444
Rankings from AP Poll

The 2004–05 Penn Quakers men's basketball team represented the University of Pennsylvania during the 2004–05 NCAA Division I men's basketball season. The Quakers, led by 16th-year head coach Fran Dunphy, played their home games at The Palestra as members of the Ivy League. They finished the season 20–9, 13–1 in Ivy League play to win the regular season championship. They received the Ivy League's automatic bid to the NCAA tournament where they lost in the first round to No. 4 seed Boston College.

== Roster ==
2004–05 Penn Quakers men's basketball team
Players
Coaches

Pos.	#	Name	Height	Weight	Year	Previous school	Hometown
G	1	Brian Grandieri	6 ft 4 in (1.93 m)	190 lb (86 kg)	Fr	Malvern Prep	Media, Pennsylvania
G	2	Ibrahim Jaaber	6 ft 2 in (1.88 m)	170 lb (77 kg)	So	Peddie School	Elizabeth, New Jersey
F	3	Steve Danley	6 ft 8 in (2.03 m)	225 lb (102 kg)	So	DeMatha Catholic	Germantown, Maryland
G	4	Michael Kach	6 ft 4 in (1.93 m)	194 lb (88 kg)	Fr	The Winchendon School	Carmel, New York
F	11	Jan Fikiel	6 ft 10 in (2.08 m)	215 lb (98 kg)	Sr	Westminster Academy	Ulm, Germany
G	13	David Whitehurst	6 ft 3 in (1.91 m)	195 lb (88 kg)	Fr	Lawrenceville School	Tinton Falls, New Jersey
G	14	Eric Osmundson	6 ft 5 in (1.96 m)	200 lb (91 kg)	Sr	St. Augustine; Utah	Carlsbad, California
G	20	Lorenz Manthey	6 ft 2 in (1.88 m)	194 lb (88 kg)	So	Westchester Academy	Hamburg, Germany
G	22	Adam Franklin	6 ft 6 in (1.98 m)	215 lb (98 kg)	Jr	Tatnall School; North Carolina	New Castle, Delaware
G/F	23	Joe Gill	6 ft 6 in (1.98 m)	180 lb (82 kg)	Fr	Germantown Academy	Doylestown, Pennsylvania
F	24	Mark Zoller	6 ft 7 in (2.01 m)	220 lb (100 kg)	So	St. Joseph's Prep	Blue Bell, Pennsylvania
G	31	Tim Begley	6 ft 6 in (1.98 m)	230 lb (104 kg)	Sr	Christian Brothers Academy	Freehold Township, New Jersey
G/F	33	Friedrich Ebede	6 ft 6 in (1.98 m)	190 lb (86 kg)	Jr	Northfield Mount Hermon	Douala, Cameroon
F	34	Ryan Pettinella	6 ft 9 in (2.06 m)	230 lb (104 kg)	So	McQuaid Jesuit	Pittsford, New York
F	42	Eric Heil	6 ft 8 in (2.03 m)	205 lb (93 kg)	Sr	Pleasant Valley; Lehigh	Bettendorf, Iowa
F/C	50	Nameir Majette	6 ft 9 in (2.06 m)	220 lb (100 kg)	Sr	Hertford County	Ahoskie, North Carolina

Head coach

- Fran Dunphy (La Salle)

Assistant coach(es)

- Gil Jackson (Elizabethtown)
- Dave Duke (Villanova)
- Matt Langel (Penn)

Legend

- (C) Team captain
- (S) Suspended
- (I) Ineligible
- (W) Walk-on
- Injured
- Current redshirt

Roster

== Schedule and results ==
Date time, TV	Rank^{#}	Opponent^{#}	Result	Record	Site (attendance) city, state
Regular season
Nov 16, 2004*		Quinnipiac	W 74–60	1–0	The Palestra; Philadelphia, Pennsylvania
Nov 18, 2004*		at Providence	L 52–89	1–1	Dunkin Donuts Center; Providence, Rhode Island
Nov 20, 2004*		at No. 21 Wisconsin	L 44–77	1–2	Kohl Center; Madison, Wisconsin
Nov 23, 2004*		Drexel	W 81–50	2–2	The Palestra; Philadelphia, Pennsylvania
Dec 1, 2004*		Bucknell	W 65–52	3–2	The Palestra; Philadelphia, Pennsylvania
Dec 4, 2004*		La Salle	W 78–67	4–2	The Palestra; Philadelphia, Pennsylvania
Dec 8, 2004*		at Temple	L 51–52	4–3	Liacouras Center; Philadelphia, Pennsylvania
Dec 31, 2004*		at Villanova	L 64–74	4–4	Wachovia Center; Philadelphia, Pennsylvania
Jan 4, 2005*		at San Francisco	L 61–65	4–5	War Memorial Gymnasium; San Francisco, California
Jan 8, 2005*		at Illinois-Chicago	L 47–57	4–6	UIC Pavilion; Chicago, Illinois
Mar 8, 2005		at Princeton	W 64–56	20–8 (13–1)	Jadwin Gymnasium; Princeton, New Jersey
NCAA tournament
Mar 17, 2005*	(13 CHI)	vs. (4 CHI) No. 14 Boston College; First round	L 65–85	20–9	Henry J. Goodman Arena; Cleveland, Ohio
*Non-conference game. ^{#}Rankings from AP Poll. (#) Tournament seedings in parentheses. CHI=Chicago. All times are in Eastern Time.

== Awards and honors ==
- Tim Begley – Ivy League Player of the Year; unanimous first-team All-Ivy League
