= 2001–02 Penn Quakers men's basketball team =

American college basketball season

2001–02 Penn Quakers men's basketball

Ivy League champions

NCAA tournament, first round
- Conference: Ivy League
- Record: 25–7 (11–3 Ivy)
- Head coach: Fran Dunphy (13th season)
- Assistant coach: Dave Duke
- Home arena: The Palestra

2001–02 Ivy League men's basketball standings
	Conf.				Overall
Team	W		L	PCT	W		L	PCT
Penn	11	–	3	.786	25	–	7	.781
Yale	11	–	3	.786	21	–	11	.656
Princeton	11	–	3	.786	16	–	12	.571
Brown	8	–	6	.571	17	–	10	.630
Harvard	7	–	7	.500	14	–	12	.538
Columbia	4	–	10	.286	11	–	17	.393
Dartmouth	2	–	12	.143	9	–	18	.333
Cornell	2	–	12	.143	5	–	22	.185
Rankings from AP Poll

The 2001–02 Penn Quakers men's basketball team represented the University of Pennsylvania during the 2001–02 NCAA Division I men's basketball season. The Quakers, led by 13th-year head coach Fran Dunphy, played their home games at The Palestra as members of the Ivy League. They finished the season 25–7, 11–3 in Ivy League play to win the regular season championship. They received the Ivy League's automatic bid to the NCAA tournament where they lost in the first round to California.

== Roster ==
2001–02 Penn Quakers men's basketball team
Players
Coaches

Pos.	#	Name	Height	Weight	Year	Previous school	Hometown
F	1	Ugonna Onyekwe	6 ft 8 in (2.03 m)	215 lb (98 kg)	Jr	Mercersburg Academy	Lagos, Nigeria
G	31	Tim Begley	6 ft 6 in (1.98 m)	230 lb (104 kg)	Fr	Christian Brothers Academy	Freehold Township, New Jersey

Head coach

- Fran Dunphy (Ursinus)

Assistant coach(es)

- Dave Duke (Villanova)

Legend

- (C) Team captain
- (S) Suspended
- (I) Ineligible
- (W) Walk-on
- Injured
- Current redshirt

Roster

== Schedule and results ==
Date time, TV	Rank^{#}	Opponent^{#}	Result	Record	Site (attendance) city, state
Regular season
Nov 19, 2001*		at Georgia Tech	W 79–74	1–0	Alexander Memorial Coliseum; Atlanta, Georgia
Nov 22, 2001*		vs. No. 2 Illinois	L 71–78	1–1	Valley High School; Las Vegas, Nevada
Nov 23, 2001*		vs. Eastern Illinois	W 77–60	2–1	Valley High School; Las Vegas, Nevada
Nov 24, 2001*		vs. Iowa State	W 84–77	3–1	Valley High School; Las Vegas, Nevada
Nov 28, 2001*		Drexel	W 89–80	4–1	The Palestra; Philadelphia, Pennsylvania
Dec 1, 2001*		at American	W 61–51	5–1	Bender Arena; Washington, D.C.
Dec 5, 2001*		Villanova	W 75–74 ^{OT}	6–1	The Palestra; Philadelphia, Pennsylvania
Dec 8, 2001*		No. 18 Saint Joseph's	L 61–67	6–2	The Palestra; Philadelphia, Pennsylvania
Dec 22, 2001*		Davidson	L 71–75 ^{OT}	6–3	The Palestra; Philadelphia, Pennsylvania
Dec 30, 2001*		at Temple	W 68–62	7–3	Liacouras Center; Philadelphia, Pennsylvania
Jan 5, 2002*		at Lehigh	W 74–58	8–3	Stabler Arena; Bethlehem, Pennsylvania
Jan 7, 2002*		Florida International	W 75–49	9–3	The Palestra; Philadelphia, Pennsylvania
Jan 11, 2002		at Dartmouth	W 87–71	10–3 (1–0)	Leede Arena; Hanover, New Hampshire
Jan 12, 2002		at Harvard	L 75–78 ^{OT}	10–4 (1–1)	Lavietes Pavilion; Cambridge, Massachusetts
Jan 17, 2002*		Delaware	W 50–44	11–4	The Palestra; Philadelphia, Pennsylvania
Jan 21, 2002*		Lafayette	W 73–66	12–4	The Palestra; Philadelphia, Pennsylvania
Jan 26, 2002*		Saint Joseph's	W 62–60	13–4	The Palestra; Philadelphia, Pennsylvania
Jan 29, 2002*		at La Salle	W 81–76 ^{OT}	14–4	Tom Gola Arena; Philadelphia, Pennsylvania
Feb 1, 2002		Cornell	W 75–63	15–4 (2–1)	The Palestra; Philadelphia, Pennsylvania
Feb 2, 2002		Columbia	L 53–54	15–5 (2–2)	The Palestra; Philadelphia, Pennsylvania
Feb 8, 2002		at Yale	L 78–83	15–6 (2–3)	John J. Lee Amphitheater; New Haven, Connecticut
Feb 9, 2002		at Brown	W 84–74	16–6 (3–3)	Pizzitola Sports Center; Providence, Rhode Island
Feb 12, 2002		at Princeton	W 62–38	17–6 (4–3)	Jadwin Gymnasium; Princeton, New Jersey
Feb 15, 2002		Harvard	W 78–51	18–6 (5–3)	The Palestra; Philadelphia, Pennsylvania
Feb 16, 2002		Dartmouth	W 100–62	19–6 (6–3)	The Palestra; Philadelphia, Pennsylvania
Feb 22, 2002		Brown	W 82–63	20–6 (7–3)	The Palestra; Philadelphia, Pennsylvania
Feb 23, 2002		Yale	W 72–63	21–6 (8–3)	The Palestra; Philadelphia, Pennsylvania
Mar 1, 2002		at Columbia	W 51–47	22–6 (9–3)	Levien Gymnasium; New York, New York
Mar 2, 2002		at Cornell	W 78–53	23–6 (10–3)	Newman Arena; Ithaca, New York
Mar 5, 2002		Princeton	W 64–48	24–6 (11–3)	The Palestra; Philadelphia, Pennsylvania
Ivy League Playoff
Mar 9, 2002*		Yale; Playoff	W 77–58	25–6	Kirby Sports Center; Easton, Pennsylvania
NCAA tournament
Mar 15, 2002*	(6 S)	vs. (11 S) California; First round	L 75–82	25–7	Mellon Arena; Pittsburgh, Pennsylvania
*Non-conference game. ^{#}Rankings from AP Poll. (#) Tournament seedings in parentheses. S=South. All times are in Eastern Time.

== Awards and honors ==
- Ugonna Onyekwe – Ivy League Player of the Year
