= 2006–07 Ivy League men's basketball season =

- League: NCAA Division I
- Sport: College Basketball
- Number of teams: 8

Regular Season
- League champions: Penn
- Season MVP: Ibrahim Jaaber, Penn

Seasons
- ← 2005-06 2007-08 →

2006–07 Ivy League men's basketball standings
	Conf.				Overall
Team	W		L	PCT	W		L	PCT
Penn	13	–	1	.929	22	–	9	.710
Yale	10	–	4	.714	14	–	13	.519
Cornell	9	–	5	.643	16	–	12	.571
Columbia	7	–	7	.500	16	–	12	.571
Brown	6	–	8	.429	11	–	18	.379
Harvard	5	–	9	.357	12	–	16	.429
Dartmouth	3	–	11	.214	10	–	18	.357
Princeton	2	–	12	.143	11	–	17	.393

The 2006–07 Ivy League men's basketball season was the Ivy League's 53rd season of basketball. The Ivy league doesn't have a tournament to determine the league champion; Instead the team with the best record is the champion. Ibrahim Jaaber, who played for the Penn Quakers, won the Ivy League Men's Basketball Player of the Year for the second straight year.

== All-Ivy Teams ==
First Team All-Ivy
	School	Class	Position
Ibrahim Jaaber	Penn	Senior	Guard
Mark McAndrew	Brown	Junior	Guard
John Baumann	Columbia	Junior	Forward
Mark Zoller	Penn	Senior	Forward
Eric Flato	Yale	Junior	Guard

Second Team All-Ivy
	School	Class	Position
Andrew Naeve	Cornell	Senior	Center
Ryan Wittman	Cornell	Freshman	Forward
Leon Pattman	Dartmouth	Senior	Guard
Brian Grandieri	Penn	Junior	Guard
Casey Hughes	Yale	Senior	Guard

== NCAA Tournament ==
Seed	Region	School	First Four	Round of 64	Round of 32	Sweet 16	Elite Eight	Final Four	Championship
14	South	Penn	n/a	Eliminated by Texas A&M, 68-52 (box)					
		W–L (%):	0–0 –	0–1 .000	0–0 .000	0–0 –	0–0 –	0–0 –	0–0 –Total:0-1 .000
