= 1994–95 Penn Quakers men's basketball team =

American college basketball season

1994–95 Penn Quakers men's basketball

Ivy League champions

NCAA tournament, first round
- Conference: Ivy League
- Record: 22–6 (14–0 Ivy)
- Head coach: Fran Dunphy (6th season)
- Home arena: The Palestra

1994–95 Ivy League men's basketball standings
	Conf.				Overall
Team	W		L	PCT	W		L	PCT
Penn	14	–	0	1.000	22	–	6	.786
Princeton	10	–	4	.714	16	–	10	.615
Dartmouth	10	–	4	.714	13	–	13	.500
Brown	8	–	6	.571	13	–	13	.500
Yale	5	–	9	.357	9	–	17	.346
Cornell	4	–	10	.286	9	–	17	.346
Harvard	4	–	10	.286	6	–	20	.231
Columbia	1	–	13	.071	4	–	22	.154
Rankings from AP Poll

The 1994–95 Penn Quakers men's basketball team represented the University of Pennsylvania during the 1994–95 NCAA Division I men's basketball season. The Quakers, led by 6th-year head coach Fran Dunphy, played their home games at The Palestra as members of the Ivy League. They finished the season 22–6, 14–0 in Ivy League play to win the conference championship. They received the Ivy League's automatic bid to the NCAA tournament where they lost in the First Round to No. 5 seed Alabama.

This was the third consecutive 14–0 seasons in Ivy League play and one of five overall in the Dunphy era.

== Roster ==
1994–95 Penn Quakers men's basketball team
Players
Coaches

Pos.	#	Name	Height	Weight	Year	Previous school	Hometown
G	12	Matt Maloney	6 ft 3 in (1.91 m)	185 lb (84 kg)	Sr	Vanderbilt	Haddonfield, New Jersey
F	23	Tim Krug	6 ft 5 in (1.96 m)	—	Jr
G	53	Jerome Allen	6 ft 4 in (1.93 m)	180 lb (82 kg)	Sr	Episcopal Academy	Philadelphia, Pennsylvania
F		Ira Bowman	6 ft 5 in (1.96 m)	190 lb (86 kg)	Jr	Providence	Newark, New Jersey
		Dan Leibovitz	—	—	Jr
F		Shawn Trice	6 ft 7 in (2.01 m)	—	Sr

Head coach

- Fran Dunphy

Assistant coach(es)

Legend

- (C) Team captain
- (S) Suspended
- (I) Ineligible
- (W) Walk-on
- Injured
- Current redshirt

Roster

== Schedule and results ==
Date time, TV	Rank^{#}	Opponent^{#}	Result	Record	Site (attendance) city, state
Non-conference regular season
Nov 16, 1994*		Canisius	L 78–81	0–1	Palestra; Philadelphia, Pennsylvania
Nov 28, 1994*		at Lehigh	W 82–79 ^{OT}	1–1	Stabler Arena; Bethlehem, Pennsylvania
Dec 3, 1994*		Ohio State	W 91–71	2–1	Palestra; Philadelphia, Pennsylvania
Dec 10, 1994*		Fairleigh Dickinson	W 101–71	3–1	Palestra; Philadelphia, Pennsylvania
Dec 13, 1994*		at No. 25 Michigan	W 62–60	4–1	Crisler Arena; Ann Arbor, Michigan
Dec 27, 1994*		vs. Colgate	W 93–58	5–1	Madison Square Garden; New York, New York
Dec 28, 1994*		vs. No. 25 St. John's	W 79–73	6–1	Madison Square Garden; New York, New York
Ivy League regular season
Jan 6, 1995	No. 25	at Harvard	W 90–63	7–1 (1–0)	Lavietes Pavilion; Boston, Massachusetts
Jan 7, 1995	No. 25	at Dartmouth	W 85–70	8–1 (2–0)	Leede Arena; Hanover, New Hampshire
Jan 14, 1995*	No. 21	at No. 1 UMass	L 60–93	8–2	Mullins Center (9,493); Amherst, Massachusetts
Jan 17, 1995*	No. 25	La Salle	W 90–71	9–2	Palestra; Philadelphia, Pennsylvania
Jan 21, 1995*	No. 25	at Saint Joseph's	W 90–71 ^{OT}	9–3	Alumni Memorial Fieldhouse; Philadelphia, Pennsylvania
Jan 23, 1995*		at Lafayette	W 92–57	10–3 (2–0)	Allan P. Kirby Field House; Easton, Pennsylvania
Jan 28, 1995		Princeton	W 69–50	11–3 (3–0)	Palestra; Philadelphia, Pennsylvania
Feb 3, 1995		at Yale	W 66–55	12–3 (4–0)	Payne Whitney Gymnasium; New Haven, Connecticut
Feb 4, 1995		at Brown	W 95–83	13–3 (5–0)	Pizzitola Sports Center; Providence, Rhode Island
Feb 10, 1995		Cornell	W 101–71	14–3 (6–0)	Palestra; Philadelphia, Pennsylvania
Feb 11, 1995		Columbia	W 90–55	15–3 (7–0)	Palestra; Philadelphia, Pennsylvania
Feb 14, 1995*		Temple	L 56–59	15–4	Palestra; Philadelphia, Pennsylvania
Feb 17, 1995		Dartmouth	W 73–62	16–4 (8–0)	Palestra; Philadelphia, Pennsylvania
Feb 18, 1995		Harvard	W 86–73	17–4 (9–0)	Palestra; Philadelphia, Pennsylvania
Feb 22, 1995*		at No. 9 Villanova	L 74–78	17–5	The Pavilion; Philadelphia, Pennsylvania
Feb 24, 1995		at Columbia	W 88–48	18–5 (10–0)	Levien Gymnasium; New York, New York
Feb 25, 1995		at Cornell	W 97–56	19–5 (11–0)	Newman Arena; Ithaca, New York
Mar 3, 1995		Brown	W 85–55	20–5 (12–0)	Palestra; Philadelphia, Pennsylvania
Mar 4, 1995		Yale	W 82–57	21–5 (13–0)	Palestra; Philadelphia, Pennsylvania
Mar 8, 1995		at Princeton	W 69–57	22–5 (14–0)	Jadwin Gymnasium; Princeton, New Jersey
NCAA tournament
Mar 16, 1995*	(12 E)	vs. (5 E) No. 20 Alabama; First Round	L 85–91 ^{OT}	22–6	Baltimore Arena; Baltimore, Maryland
*Non-conference game. ^{#}Rankings from AP Poll. (#) Tournament seedings in parentheses. E=East. All times are in Eastern Time.

== Awards and honors ==
- Matt Maloney – Ivy League Player of the Year
