= 1998–99 Princeton Tigers men's basketball team =

American college basketball season

1998–1999 Princeton Tigers men's basketball

Rainbow Classic Champions

1999 National Invitation Tournament, Quarterfinals
- Conference: Ivy League
- Record: 22–8 (11–3, 2nd Ivy)
- Head coach: Bill Carmody (3rd season)
- Captains: Brian Earl; Gabe Lewullis
- Home arena: Jadwin Gymnasium

1998–99 Ivy League men's basketball standings
	Conf.				Overall
Team	W		L	PCT	W		L	PCT
Penn	13	–	1	.929	21	–	6	.778
Princeton	11	–	3	.786	22	–	8	.733
Dartmouth	10	–	4	.714	14	–	12	.538
Harvard	7	–	7	.500	13	–	13	.500
Cornell	6	–	8	.429	11	–	15	.423
Columbia	5	–	9	.357	10	–	16	.385
Brown	2	–	12	.143	4	–	22	.154
Yale	2	–	12	.143	4	–	22	.154
Rankings from AP Poll

The 1998–99 Princeton Tigers men's basketball team represented the Princeton University in intercollegiate college basketball during the 1998–99 NCAA Division I men's basketball season. The head coach was Bill Carmody and the team co-captains were Brian Earl and Gabe Lewullis. The team played its home games in the Jadwin Gymnasium on the University campus in Princeton, New Jersey, and was the runner-up of the Ivy League. The team earned an invitation to the 32-team 1999 National Invitation Tournament.

Using the Princeton offense, the team had a mid season eleven-game winning streak and posted a 22–8 overall record and an 11–3 conference record. On March 10, the team came back from a 23-point half time deficit and a 27-point deficit with 15:11 remaining against the Penn Quakers to win 50–49. Although the team failed to secure an invitation to the 1999 NCAA Men's Division I Basketball Tournament, the team defeated several entrants in the tournament including the UAB Blazers and conference foe Penn as well as wins on back-to-back nights against Texas and Charlotte to win the 8-team Rainbow Classic held in Honolulu, Hawaii. As of 2010, the 27-point comeback from 13–40 with 15:11 remaining to win 50–49 over Penn on February 9, 1999, remains the fifth-largest comeback and fourth-largest second-half comeback in NCAA history. That game's 9–33 half time deficit comeback remains the second-largest comeback. In the National Invitation Tournament the team defeated the Georgetown Hoyas 54–47 at home on March 10, 1998 and the NC State Wolfpack 61–58 on March 15 at Reynolds Coliseum in Raleigh, North Carolina before losing to the Xavier Musketeers at Cincinnati Gardens Cincinnati, Ohio, on March 17 by a 65–58 score.

The team was led by All-Ivy League first team selections Lewullis and Earl, who won the Ivy League Men's Basketball Player of the Year, as well as Ivy League Men's Basketball Rookie of the Year Chris Young. The team won the eleventh of twelve consecutive national statistical championships in scoring defense with a 52.7 points allowed average. Earl ended his Princeton career as the Ivy League's all-time three-point field goal with 281, surpassing Matt Maloney's 244. The total continues to be the all-time record. He also achieved a 90.9% free throw percentage in conference games to earn the Ivy League statistical championship.

== Schedule and results ==
The team posted a 22-8 (11-3 Ivy League) record.

Date time, TV	Rank^{#}	Opponent^{#}	Result	Record	Site city, state
Regular season
Nov 18, 1998*		at Lafayette	L 47–63	0–1	Allan P. Kirby Field House; Easton, Pennsylvania
Nov 21, 1998*		at UNC Wilmington	W 61–54 ^{OT}	1–1	Trask Coliseum; Wilmington, North Carolina
Nov 28, 1998*		at Monmouth	W 63–36	2–1	Boylan Gymnasium; West Long Branch, New Jersey
Dec 4, 1998*		vs. Western Illinois; ISU Cyclone Challenge	L 71–72 ^{OT}	2–2	Hilton Coliseum; Ames, Iowa
Dec 5, 1998*		vs. North Texas; ISU Cyclone Challenge	W 68–48	3–2	Hilton Coliseum; Ames, Iowa
Dec 9, 1998*		Bucknell	W 68–27	4–2	Jadwin Gymnasium; Princeton, New Jersey
Dec 15, 1998*		at UAB	W 69–57	5–2	Bartow Arena; Birmingham, Alabama
Dec 19, 1998*		at No. 5 Maryland	L 58–81	5–3	Baltimore Arena; Baltimore, Maryland
Dec 22, 1998*		Rutgers	L 49–60	5–4	Jadwin Gymnasium; Princeton, New Jersey
Dec 27, 1998*		vs. Florida State; Rainbow Classic	W 50–46	6–4	Special Events Arena; Honolulu, Hawaii
Dec 28, 1998*		vs. Texas; Rainbow Classic	W 56–46	7–4	Special Events Arena; Honolulu, Hawaii
Dec 29, 1998*		vs. Charlotte; Rainbow Classic	W 47–43	8–4	Special Events Arena; Honolulu, Hawaii
Jan 8, 1999		Brown	W 67–45	9–4 (1–0)	Jadwin Gymnasium; Princeton, New Jersey
Jan 9, 1999		Yale	W 66–33	10–4 (2–0)	Jadwin Gymnasium; Princeton, New Jersey
Jan 25, 1999*		Union (NY)	W 81–48	11–4	Jadwin Gymnasium; Princeton, New Jersey
Jan 29, 1999		at Columbia	W 46–40	12–4 (3–0)	Levien Gymnasium; New York, New York
Jan 30, 1999		at Cornell	W 56–46	13–4 (4–0)	Newman Arena; Ithaca, New York
Feb 5, 1999		Harvard	W 66–60	14–4 (5–0)	Jadwin Gymnasium; Princeton, New Jersey
Feb 6, 1999		Dartmouth	W 76–48	15–4 (6–0)	Jadwin Gymnasium; Princeton, New Jersey
Feb 9, 1999		at Penn	W 50–49	16–4 (7–0)	The Palestra; Philadelphia, Pennsylvania
Feb 12, 1999		at Yale	L 58–60 ^{2OT}	16–5 (7–1)	John J. Lee Amphitheater; New Haven, Connecticut
Feb 13, 1999		at Brown	W 67–45	17–5 (8–1)	Pizzitola Sports Center; Providence, Rhode Island
Feb 19, 1999		at Dartmouth	W 65–51	18–5 (9–1)	Leede Arena; Hanover, New Hampshire
Feb 20, 1999		at Harvard	L 79–87 ^{OT}	18–6 (9–2)	Lavietes Pavilion; Cambridge, Massachusetts
Feb 26, 1999		Cornell	W 65–45	19–6 (10–2)	Jadwin Gymnasium; Princeton, New Jersey
Feb 27, 1999		Columbia	W 88–52	20–6 (11–2)	Jadwin Gymnasium; Princeton, New Jersey
Mar 2, 1999		Penn	L 48–73	20–7 (11–3)	Jadwin Gymnasium; Princeton, New Jersey
National Invitation Tournament
Mar 10, 1999*		Georgetown; First round	W 54–47	21–7	Jadwin Gymnasium; Princeton, New Jersey
Mar 15, 1999*		at NC State; Second round	W 61–58	22–7	Reynolds Coliseum; Raleigh, North Carolina
Mar 17, 1999*		at Xavier; Quarterfinals	L 58–65	22–8	Cincinnati Gardens; Cincinnati, Ohio
*Non-conference game. ^{#}Rankings from AP Poll. (#) Tournament seedings in parentheses.
