= 1999–2000 Princeton Tigers men's basketball team =

American college basketball season

1999–2000 Princeton Tigers men's basketball

2000 National Invitation Tournament, First Round
- Conference: Ivy League
- Record: 19–11 (11–3, 2nd Ivy)
- Head coach: Bill Carmody (4th season)
- Captains: Mason Rocca; Chris Young
- Home arena: Jadwin Gymnasium

1999–2000 Ivy League men's basketball standings
	Conf.				Overall
Team	W		L	PCT	W		L	PCT
Penn	14	–	0	1.000	21	–	8	.724
Princeton	11	–	3	.786	19	–	11	.633
Columbia	7	–	7	.500	13	–	14	.481
Harvard	7	–	7	.500	12	–	15	.444
Dartmouth	5	–	9	.357	9	–	18	.333
Yale	5	–	9	.357	7	–	20	.259
Brown	4	–	10	.286	8	–	19	.296
Cornell	3	–	11	.214	10	–	17	.370
Rankings from AP Poll

The 1999–2000 Princeton Tigers men's basketball team represented the Princeton University in intercollegiate college basketball during the 1999–2000 NCAA Division I men's basketball season. The head coach was Bill Carmody and the team co-captains were Mason Rocca and Chris Young. The team played its home games in the Jadwin Gymnasium on the University campus in Princeton, New Jersey, and was the runner-up of the Ivy League. The team earned an invitation to the 32-team 2000 National Invitation Tournament.

Using the Princeton offense, the team recovered from a 1–4 start and posted a 19–11 overall record and an 11–3 conference record. On December 18, 1999, against UAB Blazers, Spencer Gloger made 10 three-point field goals in a single game to tie Matt Maloney's current Ivy League record with a total that continues to stand as the highest total by an Ivy League player against a non-league foe. In the National Invitation Tournament the team lost its first round contest against the Penn State Nittany Lions at Bryce Jordan Center State College, Pennsylvania, on March 15 by a 55–41 score.

The team was led by All-Ivy League first team selection Chris Young. The team won the twelfth of twelve consecutive national statistical championships in scoring defense with a 54.6 points allowed average. Young led the Ivy League in field goal percentage with a 55.3% average in conference games. He also led the conference in blocked shots with 90, which continues to be the second highest single-season total in league history.

This was the last season as coach for Carmody who gave way to John Thompson III the following year. Carmody helped Princeton achieve a 76.1% (210–66) winning percentage for the decade of the 1990s, which was the eighth best in the nation. Carmody retired with the Ivy League's all-time highest winning percentage in all games (78.6%, 92–25), surpassing Butch van Breda Kolff's 76.9% mark, and in conference games (89.3%, 50–6), surpassing Chuck Daly's 88.1% mark.

== Schedule and results ==
The team posted a 19–11 (11-3 Ivy League) record.

Date time, TV	Rank^{#}	Opponent^{#}	Result	Record	Site city, state
Regular season
Nov 12, 1999*		at No. 17 Syracuse; NABC Classic	L 43–60	0–1	Carrier Dome; Syracuse, New York
Nov 13, 1999*		vs. Missouri; NABC Classic	L 48–51	0–2	Carrier Dome; Syracuse, New York
Nov 20, 1999*		Monmouth	W 37–35	1–2	Jadwin Gymnasium; Princeton, New Jersey
Nov 26, 1999*		vs. Ohio	L 60–68	1–3	Halifax Metro Center; Halifax, Nova Scotia
Dec 3, 1999*		vs. UNLV; Food Lion MVP Classic	L 66–76	1–4	Charlotte Coliseum; Charlotte, North Carolina
Dec 4, 1999*		vs. College of Charleston; Food Lion MVP Classic	W 62–44	2–4	Charlotte Coliseum; Charlotte, North Carolina
Dec 7, 1999*		at Bucknell	W 50–48	3–4	Davis Gym; Lewisburg, Pennsylvania
Dec 9, 1999*		TCU	W 77–72 ^{OT}	4–4	Jadwin Gymnasium; Princeton, New Jersey
Dec 12, 1999*		at Rutgers	W 66–60 ^{OT}	5–4	Louis Brown Athletic Center; Piscataway, New Jersey
Dec 18, 1999*		UAB	W 64–41	6–4	Jadwin Gymnasium; Princeton, New Jersey
Dec 22, 1999*		at No. 12 Kansas	L 67–82	6–5	Allen Fieldhouse; Lawrence, Kansas
Dec 27, 1999*		at Xavier	L 54–58	6–6	Cincinnati Gardens; Cincinnati, Ohio
Dec 31, 1999*		Holy Cross	W 51–41	7–6	Jadwin Gymnasium; Princeton, New Jersey
Jan 8, 2000*		Lafayette	L 69–70 ^{OT}	7–7	Jadwin Gymnasium; Princeton, New Jersey
Jan 24, 2000*		Catholic	W 90–49	8–7	Jadwin Gymnasium; Princeton, New Jersey
Jan 28, 2000		at Cornell	W 59–44	9–7 (1–0)	Newman Arena; Ithaca, New York
Jan 29, 2000		at Columbia	W 53–46	10–7 (2–0)	Levien Gymnasium; New York, New York
Feb 4, 2000		at Brown	W 76–60	11–7 (3–0)	Pizzitola Sports Center; Providence, Rhode Island
Feb 5, 2000		at Yale	L 42–44	11–8 (3–1)	John J. Lee Amphitheater; New Haven, Connecticut
Feb 11, 2000		Dartmouth	W 72–47	12–8 (4–1)	Jadwin Gymnasium; Princeton, New Jersey
Feb 12, 2000		Harvard	W 73–55	13–8 (5–1)	Jadwin Gymnasium; Princeton, New Jersey
Feb 15, 2000		Penn	L 46–55	13–9 (5–2)	Jadwin Gymnasium; Princeton, New Jersey
Feb 18, 2000		Columbia	W 81–52	14–9 (6–2)	Jadwin Gymnasium; Princeton, New Jersey
Feb 19, 2000		Cornell	W 79–43	15–9 (7–2)	Jadwin Gymnasium; Princeton, New Jersey
Feb 25, 2000		at Harvard	W 63–48	16–9 (8–2)	Lavietes Pavilion; Cambridge, Massachusetts
Feb 26, 2000		at Dartmouth	W 68–57	17–9 (9–2)	Leede Arena; Hanover, New Hampshire
Mar 3, 2000		Yale	W 56–46	18–9 (10–2)	Jadwin Gymnasium; Princeton, New Jersey
Mar 4, 2000		Brown	W 85–57	19–9 (11–2)	Jadwin Gymnasium; Princeton, New Jersey
Mar 7, 2000		at Penn	L 52–73	19–10 (11–3)	The Palestra; Philadelphia, Pennsylvania
National Invitation Tournament
Mar 15, 2000*		at Penn State	L 41–55	19–11	Bryce Jordan Center; University Park, Pennsylvania
*Non-conference game. ^{#}Rankings from AP Poll. (#) Tournament seedings in parentheses.
