= 1993–94 Penn Quakers men's basketball team =

American college basketball season

1993–94 Penn Quakers men's basketball

Ivy League champions

NCAA tournament, second round
- Conference: Ivy League

Ranking
- Coaches: No. 25
- Record: 25–3 (14–0 Ivy)
- Head coach: Fran Dunphy (5th season)
- Home arena: The Palestra

1993–94 Ivy League men's basketball standings
	Conf.				Overall
Team	W		L	PCT	W		L	PCT
Penn	14	–	0	1.000	25	–	3	.893
Princeton	11	–	3	.786	18	–	8	.692
Yale	7	–	7	.500	10	–	16	.385
Brown	6	–	8	.429	12	–	14	.462
Dartmouth	6	–	8	.429	10	–	16	.385
Harvard	5	–	9	.357	9	–	17	.346
Columbia	4	–	10	.286	6	–	20	.231
Cornell	3	–	11	.214	8	–	18	.308
Rankings from AP Poll

The 1993–94 Penn Quakers men's basketball team represented the University of Pennsylvania during the 1993–94 NCAA Division I men's basketball season. The Quakers, led by 5th-year head coach Fran Dunphy, played their home games at The Palestra as members of the Ivy League. They finished the season 25–3, 14–0 in Ivy League play to win the conference championship. They received the Ivy League's automatic bid to the NCAA tournament where they defeated No. 6 seed Nebraska in the opening round before losing to No. 3 seed and eventual Final Four participant Florida in the second round.

This was the second of three consecutive 14–0 seasons, and one of five overall in the Dunphy era, in Ivy League play.

== Roster ==
1993–94 Penn Quakers men's basketball team
Players
Coaches

Pos.	#	Name	Height	Weight	Year	Previous school	Hometown
G	12	Matt Maloney	6 ft 3 in (1.91 m)	185 lb (84 kg)	Jr	Vanderbilt	Haddonfield, New Jersey
F	23	Tim Krug	6 ft 5 in (1.96 m)	—	So
G	53	Jerome Allen	6 ft 4 in (1.93 m)	180 lb (82 kg)	Jr	Episcopal Academy	Philadelphia, Pennsylvania
		Dan Leibovitz	—	—	So
F		Shawn Trice	6 ft 7 in (2.01 m)	—	Sr

Head coach

- Fran Dunphy

Assistant coach(es)

Legend

- (C) Team captain
- (S) Suspended
- (I) Ineligible
- (W) Walk-on
- Injured
- Current redshirt

Roster

== Schedule and results ==
Date time, TV	Rank^{#}	Opponent^{#}	Result	Record	Site (attendance) city, state
Non-conference regular season
Nov 27, 1993*		at USC	W 77–62	1–0	L.A. Sports Arena; Los Angeles, California
Nov 29, 1993*		at Ohio State	L 80–83	1–1	St. John Arena; Columbus, Ohio
Dec 4, 1993*		at Fairleigh Dickinson	W 62–47	2–1	Rothman Center; Hackensack, New Jersey
Dec 11, 1993*		vs. Saint Joseph's	W 79–77	3–1	The Spectrum; Philadelphia, Pennsylvania
Dec 18, 1993*		Haverford	W 114–73	4–1	The Palestra; Philadelphia, Pennsylvania
Dec 28, 1993*		at Washington	W 71–68	5–1	Hec Edmundson Pavilion; Seattle, Washington
Dec 29, 1993*		vs. Georgia	W 81–79	6–1	Hec Edmundson Pavilion; Seattle, Washington
Jan 3, 1994*		Lehigh	W 87–62	7–1	The Palestra; Philadelphia, Pennsylvania
Ivy League regular season
Jan 7, 1994		Harvard	W 92–76	8–1 (1–0)	The Palestra; Philadelphia, Pennsylvania
Jan 8, 1994		Dartmouth	W 71–51	9–1 (2–0)	The Palestra; Philadelphia, Pennsylvania
Jan 11, 1994*		at No. 13 Temple	L 65–76	9–2	McGonigle Hall; Philadelphia, Pennsylvania
Jan 17, 1994*		Lafayette	W 88–71	10–2	The Palestra; Philadelphia, Pennsylvania
Jan 25, 1994*		at La Salle	W 66–62	11–2	Convention Hall; Philadelphia, Pennsylvania
Jan 29, 1994		at Princeton	W 66–55	12–2 (3–0)	Jadwin Gymnasium; Princeton, New Jersey
Feb 4, 1994		Columbia	W 67–55	13–2 (4–0)	The Palestra; Philadelphia, Pennsylvania
Feb 5, 1994		Cornell	W 70–59	14–2 (5–0)	The Palestra; Philadelphia, Pennsylvania
Feb 7, 1994*		at Buffalo	W 77–52	15–2	Alumni Arena; Buffalo, New York
Feb 11, 1994		at Brown	W 79–59	16–2 (6–0)	Pizzitola Sports Center; Providence, Rhode Island
Feb 12, 1994		at Yale	W 76–66	17–2 (7–0)	Payne Whitney Gymnasium; New Haven, Connecticut
Feb 18, 1994		at Dartmouth	W 77–67	18–2 (8–0)	Leede Arena; Hanover, New Hampshire
Feb 19, 1994		at Harvard	W 66–65	19–2 (9–0)	Lavietes Pavilion; Cambridge, Massachusetts
Feb 25, 1994		Yale	W 87–63	20–2 (10–0)	The Palestra; Philadelphia, Pennsylvania
Feb 26, 1994		Brown	W 70–43	21–2 (11–0)	The Palestra; Philadelphia, Pennsylvania
Mar 2, 1994		Princeton	W 53–43	22–2 (12–0)	The Palestra; Philadelphia, Pennsylvania
Mar 6, 1994		at Cornell	W 81–66	23–2 (13–0)	Newman Arena; Ithaca, New York
Mar 7, 1994		at Columbia	W 89–69	24–2 (14–0)	Levien Gymnasium; New York, New York
NCAA tournament
Mar 17, 1994*	(11 E)	vs. (6 E) No. 22 Nebraska; First Round	W 90–80	25–2	Nassau Coliseum; Uniondale, New York
Mar 19, 1994*	(11 E)	vs. (3 E) No. 14 Florida; Second Round	L 58–70	25–3	Nassau Coliseum; Uniondale, New York
*Non-conference game. ^{#}Rankings from AP Poll. (#) Tournament seedings in parentheses. E=East. All times are in Eastern Time.

== Awards and honors ==
- Jerome Allen – Ivy League Player of the Year
