= 2005–06 Penn Quakers men's basketball team =

American college basketball season

2005–06 Penn Quakers men's basketball

Ivy League champions

NCAA tournament, first round
- Conference: Ivy League
- Record: 20–9 (12–2 Ivy)
- Head coach: Fran Dunphy (17th season)
- Assistant coaches: Dave Duke; Matt Langel; Shawn Trice
- Home arena: The Palestra

2005–06 Ivy League men's basketball standings
	Conf.				Overall
Team	W		L	PCT	W		L	PCT
Penn	12	–	2	.857	20	–	8	.714
Princeton	10	–	4	.714	12	–	15	.444
Cornell	8	–	6	.571	13	–	15	.464
Yale	7	–	7	.500	15	–	14	.517
Brown	6	–	8	.429	10	–	17	.370
Harvard	5	–	9	.357	13	–	14	.481
Columbia	4	–	10	.286	11	–	16	.407
Dartmouth	4	–	10	.286	6	–	21	.222

The 2005–06 Penn Quakers men's basketball team represented the University of Pennsylvania during the 2005–06 NCAA Division I men's basketball season. The Quakers, led by 17th-year head coach Fran Dunphy, played their home games at The Palestra as members of the Ivy League. They finished the season 20–9, 12–2 in Ivy League play to win the regular season championship. They received the Ivy League's automatic bid to the NCAA tournament where they lost in the first round to No. 2 seed Texas.

== Roster ==
2005–06 Penn Quakers men's basketball team
Players
Coaches

Pos.	#	Name	Height	Weight	Year	Previous school	Hometown
G	1	Brian Grandieri	6 ft 4 in (1.93 m)	190 lb (86 kg)	So	Malvern Prep	Media, Pennsylvania
G	2	Ibrahim Jaaber	6 ft 2 in (1.88 m)	170 lb (77 kg)	Jr	Peddie School	Elizabeth, New Jersey
F	3	Steve Danley	6 ft 8 in (2.03 m)	225 lb (102 kg)	Jr	DeMatha Catholic	Germantown, Maryland
G	4	Aron Cohen	6 ft 2 in (1.88 m)	180 lb (82 kg)	Fr	Abington Friends School	Huntingdon Valley, Pennsylvania
F	11	Greg Kuchinski	6 ft 6 in (1.98 m)	230 lb (104 kg)	Sr	St. Joseph	Wall, New Jersey
G	12	Kevin Egee	6 ft 3 in (1.91 m)	175 lb (79 kg)	Fr	Ridley	Ridley Park, Pennsylvania
G	13	David Whitehurst	6 ft 3 in (1.91 m)	195 lb (88 kg)	So	Lawrenceville School	Tinton Falls, New Jersey
G	14	Eric Osmundson	6 ft 5 in (1.96 m)	200 lb (91 kg)	Sr	St. Augustine; Utah	Carlsbad, California
G	22	Adam Franklin	6 ft 6 in (1.98 m)	215 lb (98 kg)	Sr	Tatnall School; North Carolina	New Castle, Delaware
G/F	23	Joe Gill	6 ft 6 in (1.98 m)	180 lb (82 kg)	So	Germantown Academy	Doylestown, Pennsylvania
F	24	Mark Zoller	6 ft 6 in (1.98 m)	220 lb (100 kg)	Jr	St. Joseph's Prep	Blue Bell, Pennsylvania
G/F	31	Tommy McMahon	6 ft 7 in (2.01 m)	210 lb (95 kg)	Fr	Junípero Serra	Hillsborough, California
G/F	33	Friedrich Ebede	6 ft 6 in (1.98 m)	190 lb (86 kg)	Sr	Northfield Mount Hermon	Douala, Cameroon
F	34	Cameron Lewis	6 ft 8 in (2.03 m)	220 lb (100 kg)	Fr	Phillips Exeter Academy	Washington, D.C.
F	42	Brennan Votel	6 ft 7 in (2.01 m)	215 lb (98 kg)	Fr	Covington Catholic	Park Hills, Kentucky

Head coach

- Fran Dunphy (La Salle)

Assistant coach(es)

- Dave Duke (Villanova)
- Matt Langel (Penn)
- Shawn Trice (Penn)

Legend

- (C) Team captain
- (S) Suspended
- (I) Ineligible
- (W) Walk-on
- Injured
- Current redshirt

Roster

== Schedule and results ==
Date time, TV	Rank^{#}	Opponent^{#}	Result	Record	Site (attendance) city, state
Regular season
Nov 26, 2005*		Drexel	W 68–60	2–0	The Palestra; Philadelphia, Pennsylvania
Dec 3, 2005*		Temple	L 46–50	3–2	The Palestra; Philadelphia, Pennsylvania
Dec 7, 2005*		at No. 1 Duke	L 59–72	3–3	Cameron Indoor Stadium; Durham, North Carolina
NCAA tournament
Mar 17, 2006*	(15 ATL)	vs. (2 ATL) No. 9 Texas; First round	L 52–60	20–9	American Airlines Center; Dallas, Texas
*Non-conference game. ^{#}Rankings from AP Poll. (#) Tournament seedings in parentheses. ATL=Atlanta. All times are in Eastern Time.

== Awards and honors ==
- Ibrahim Jaaber – Ivy League Player of the Year
