= 1992–93 Penn Quakers men's basketball team =

American college basketball season

1992–93 Penn Quakers men's basketball

Ivy League champions

NCAA tournament, first round
- Conference: Ivy League
- Record: 22–5 (14–0 Ivy)
- Head coach: Fran Dunphy (4th season)
- Home arena: The Palestra

1992–93 Ivy League men's basketball standings
| | Conf. | | | | Overall |
| Team | W | | L | PCT | W | | L | PCT |
|---|---|---|---|---|---|---|---|---|
| Penn | 14 | – | 0 | 1.000 | 22 | – | 5 | .815 |
| Columbia | 10 | – | 4 | .714 | 16 | – | 10 | .615 |
| Cornell | 9 | – | 5 | .643 | 16 | – | 10 | .615 |
| Princeton | 7 | – | 7 | .500 | 15 | – | 11 | .577 |
| Yale | 6 | – | 8 | .429 | 10 | – | 16 | .385 |
| Dartmouth | 5 | – | 9 | .357 | 11 | – | 15 | .423 |
| Harvard | 3 | – | 11 | .214 | 6 | – | 20 | .231 |
| Brown | 2 | – | 12 | .143 | 7 | – | 19 | .269 |
Rankings from AP Poll

The 1992–93 Penn Quakers men's basketball team represented the University of Pennsylvania during the 1992–93 NCAA Division I men's basketball season. The Quakers, led by 4th-year head coach Fran Dunphy, played their home games at The Palestra as members of the Ivy League. They finished the season 22–5, 14–0 in Ivy League play to win the conference championship. They received the Ivy League's automatic bid to the NCAA tournament where they lost in the First Round to No. 3 seed UMass.

This was the first of three consecutive 14–0 seasons, and one of five overall in the Dunphy era, in Ivy League play.

== Roster ==
1992–93 Penn Quakers men's basketball team
Players
Coaches

| Pos. | # | Name | Height | Weight | Year | Previous school | Hometown |
|---|---|---|---|---|---|---|---|
| G | 12 | Matt Maloney | 6 ft 3 in (1.91 m) | 185 lb (84 kg) | So | Vanderbilt | Haddonfield, New Jersey |
| F | 23 | Tim Krug | 6 ft 5 in (1.96 m) | — | Fr |
| G | 53 | Jerome Allen | 6 ft 4 in (1.93 m) | 180 lb (82 kg) | So | Episcopal Academy | Philadelphia, Pennsylvania |
| F | | Shawn Trice | 6 ft 7 in (2.01 m) | — | So |

Head coach

- Fran Dunphy

Assistant coach(es)

Legend

- (C) Team captain
- (S) Suspended
- (I) Ineligible
- (W) Walk-on
- Injured
- Current redshirt

Roster

== Schedule and results ==
| Date time, TV | Rank^{#} | Opponent^{#} | Result | Record | Site (attendance) city, state |
Non-conference regular season
| Dec 1, 1992* | | Virginia | L 68–74 | 0–1 | The Palestra; Philadelphia, Pennsylvania |
| Dec 4, 1992* | | at Navy | W 78–58 | 1–1 | Alumni Hall; Annapolis, Maryland |
| Dec 8, 1992* | | at La Salle | W 71–44 | 2–1 | Convention Hall; Philadelphia, Pennsylvania |
| Dec 11, 1992* | | Holy Cross | W 78–76 | 3–1 | The Palestra; Philadelphia, Pennsylvania |
| Dec 15, 1992* | | vs. Villanova | W 71–59 | 4–1 | |
| Dec 28, 1992* | | vs. Northwestern | W 64–61 | 5–1 | University Arena; Albuquerque, New Mexico |
| Dec 29, 1992* | | at New Mexico | L 51–54 | 5–2 | University Arena; Albuquerque, New Mexico |
| Jan 2, 1993* | | at Lehigh | W 78–68 | 6–2 | Stabler Arena; Bethlehem, Pennsylvania |
Ivy League regular season
| Jan 8, 1993 | | Dartmouth | W 88–63 | 7–2 (1–0) | The Palestra |
| Jan 9, 1993 | | Harvard | W 86–74 | 8–2 (2–0) | The Palestra |
| Jan 13, 1993* | | American | W 89–84 | 9–2 | The Palestra |
| Jan 19, 1993* | | vs. Temple | L 58–72 | 9–3 | |
NCAA tournament
| Mar 19, 1993* | (14 E) | vs. (3 E) No. 14 UMass; First Round | L 50–54 | 22–5 | Carrier Dome; Syracuse, New York |
*Non-conference game. ^{#}Rankings from AP Poll. (#) Tournament seedings in parentheses. E=East. All times are in Eastern Time.

== Awards and honors ==
- Jerome Allen – co-Ivy League Player of the Year
