= 1999–2000 Penn Quakers men's basketball team =

American college basketball season

1999–2000 Penn Quakers men's basketball

Ivy League champions

NCAA tournament, first round
- Conference: Ivy League
- Record: 21–8 (14–0 Ivy)
- Head coach: Fran Dunphy (11th season)
- Assistant coach: Dave Duke
- Home arena: The Palestra

1999–2000 Ivy League men's basketball standings
	Conf.				Overall
Team	W		L	PCT	W		L	PCT
Penn	14	–	0	1.000	21	–	8	.724
Princeton	11	–	3	.786	19	–	11	.633
Columbia	7	–	7	.500	13	–	14	.481
Harvard	7	–	7	.500	12	–	15	.444
Dartmouth	5	–	9	.357	9	–	18	.333
Yale	5	–	9	.357	7	–	20	.259
Brown	4	–	10	.286	8	–	19	.296
Cornell	3	–	11	.214	10	–	17	.370
Rankings from AP Poll

The 1999–2000 Penn Quakers men's basketball team represented the University of Pennsylvania during the 1999–2000 NCAA Division I men's basketball season. The Quakers, led by 11th-year head coach Fran Dunphy, played their home games at The Palestra as members of the Ivy League. They finished the season 21–8, 14–0 in Ivy League play to win the regular season championship. They received the Ivy League's automatic bid to the NCAA tournament where they lost in the First Round to Illinois.

== Roster ==
1999–2000 Penn Quakers men's basketball team
Players
Coaches

Pos.	#	Name	Height	Weight	Year	Previous school	Hometown
F	1	Ugonna Onyekwe	6 ft 8 in (2.03 m)	215 lb (98 kg)	Fr	Mercersburg Academy	Lagos, Nigeria
G	20	Matt Langel	6 ft 5 in (1.96 m)	—	Sr
G	23	Michael-Hakim Jordan	6 ft 0 in (1.83 m)	—	Sr	Abington	Philadelphia, Pennsylvania
F	51	Geoff Owens	6 ft 11 in (2.11 m)	—	Sr

Head coach

- Fran Dunphy (Ursinus)

Assistant coach(es)

- Dave Duke (Villanova)

Legend

- (C) Team captain
- (S) Suspended
- (I) Ineligible
- (W) Walk-on
- Injured
- Current redshirt

Roster

== Schedule and results ==
Date time, TV	Rank^{#}	Opponent^{#}	Result	Record	Site (attendance) city, state
Regular season
Nov 17, 1999*		at No. 14 Kentucky	L 50–67	0–1	Rupp Arena; Lexington, Kentucky
Dec 3, 1999*		Army	W 71–56	1–1	The Palestra; Philadelphia, Pennsylvania
Dec 4, 1999*		Penn State	L 56–59	1–2	The Palestra; Philadelphia, Pennsylvania
Dec 7, 1999*		at La Salle	L 76–83	1–3	Tom Gola Arena; Philadelphia, Pennsylvania
Dec 11, 1999*		vs. No. 8 Auburn; Arby's Hardwood Classic	L 70–77	1–4	BJCC Arena; Birmingham, Alabama
Dec 28, 1999*		vs. Portland State	W 84–74	2–4	Haas Pavilion; Berkeley, California
Dec 29, 1999*		at California	W 74–71	3–4	Haas Pavilion; Berkeley, California
Jan 4, 2000*		at No. 9 Kansas	L 59–105	3–5	Allen Fieldhouse; Lawrence, Kansas
Jan 9, 2000*		Villanova	L 65–67	3–6	The Palestra; Philadelphia, Pennsylvania
Jan 11, 2000*		Lafayette	W 80–76	4–6	The Palestra; Philadelphia, Pennsylvania
Jan 15, 2000*		at Lehigh	W 59–54	5–6	Stabler Arena; Bethlehem, Pennsylvania
Jan 20, 2000*		at Temple	L 40–44	5–7	Liacouras Center; Philadelphia, Pennsylvania
Jan 25, 2000*		Drexel	W 54–46	6–7	The Palestra; Philadelphia, Pennsylvania
Jan 28, 2000		at Columbia	W 63–37	7–7 (1–0)	Levien Gymnasium; New York, New York
Jan 29, 2000		at Cornell	W 50–47	8–7 (2–0)	Newman Arena; Ithaca, New York
Feb 1, 2000*		Saint Joseph's	W 68–65	9–7	The Palestra; Philadelphia, Pennsylvania
Feb 4, 2000		at Yale	W 61–36	10–7 (3–0)	Payne Whitney Gymnasium; New Haven, Connecticut
Feb 5, 2000		at Brown	W 83–48	11–7 (4–0)	Pizzitola Sports Center; Providence, Rhode Island
Feb 11, 2000		Harvard	W 79–52	12–7 (5–0)	The Palestra; Philadelphia, Pennsylvania
Feb 12, 2000		Dartmouth	W 75–61	13–7 (6–0)	The Palestra; Philadelphia, Pennsylvania
Feb 15, 2000		at Princeton	W 55–46	14–7 (7–0)	Jadwin Gymnasium; Princeton, New Jersey
Feb 18, 2000		Cornell	W 73–63	15–7 (8–0)	The Palestra; Philadelphia, Pennsylvania
Feb 19, 2000		Columbia	W 81–58	16–7 (9–0)	The Palestra; Philadelphia, Pennsylvania
Feb 25, 2000		at Dartmouth	W 69–55	17–7 (10–0)	Leede Arena; Hanover, New Hampshire
Feb 26, 2000		at Harvard	W 62–61	18–7 (11–0)	Lavietes Pavilion; Cambridge, Massachusetts
Mar 3, 2000		Brown	W 85–62	19–7 (12–0)	The Palestra; Philadelphia, Pennsylvania
Mar 4, 2000		Yale	W 69–52	20–7 (13–0)	The Palestra; Philadelphia, Pennsylvania
Mar 7, 2000		Princeton	W 73–52	21–7 (14–0)	The Palestra; Philadelphia, Pennsylvania
NCAA tournament
Mar 17, 2000*	(13 E)	vs. (4 E) No. 21 Illinois; First Round	L 58–68	21–8	Lawrence Joel Coliseum; Winston-Salem, North Carolina
*Non-conference game. ^{#}Rankings from AP Poll. (#) Tournament seedings in parentheses. MW=Midwest. All times are in Eastern Time.

== Awards and honors ==
- Michael-Hakim Jordan – Ivy League Player of the Year
- Ugonna Onyekwe – Ivy League Rookie of the Year
