= 2006–07 Penn Quakers men's basketball team =

American college basketball season

2006–07 Penn Quakers men's basketball

Ivy League champions

NCAA tournament, first round
- Conference: Ivy League
- Record: 22–9 (13–1 Ivy)
- Head coach: Glen Miller (1st season)
- Assistant coaches: Chris Sparks; Mike Martin; Perry Bromwell
- Home arena: The Palestra

2006–07 Ivy League men's basketball standings
	Conf.				Overall
Team	W		L	PCT	W		L	PCT
Penn	13	–	1	.929	22	–	9	.710
Yale	10	–	4	.714	14	–	13	.519
Cornell	9	–	5	.643	16	–	12	.571
Columbia	7	–	7	.500	16	–	12	.571
Brown	6	–	8	.429	11	–	18	.379
Harvard	5	–	9	.357	12	–	16	.429
Dartmouth	3	–	11	.214	10	–	18	.357
Princeton	2	–	12	.143	11	–	17	.393

The 2006–07 Penn Quakers men's basketball team represented the University of Pennsylvania during the 2006–07 NCAA Division I men's basketball season. The Quakers, led by first-year head coach Glen Miller, played their home games at The Palestra as members of the Ivy League. They finished the season 22–9, 13–1 in Ivy League play to win the regular season championship. They received the Ivy League's automatic bid to the NCAA tournament where they lost in the First Round to No. 3 seed Texas A&M.

== Roster ==
2006–07 Penn Quakers men's basketball team
Players
Coaches

Pos.	#	Name	Height	Weight	Year	Previous school	Hometown
G	2	Ibrahim Jaaber	6 ft 2 in (1.88 m)	170 lb (77 kg)	Sr	Peddie School	Elizabeth, New Jersey
F	3	Steve Danley	6 ft 8 in (2.03 m)	225 lb (102 kg)	Sr	DeMatha Catholic	Germantown, Maryland
G	4	Aron Cohen	6 ft 2 in (1.88 m)	180 lb (82 kg)	So	Abington Friends School	Huntingdon Valley, Pennsylvania
G	5	Darren Smith	6 ft 4 in (1.93 m)	200 lb (91 kg)	Fr	Peddie School	Elizabeth, New Jersey
F	13	Andreas Schreiber	6 ft 9 in (2.06 m)	235 lb (107 kg)	Fr	Brentwood School	Täby, Sweden
G	14	Michael Kach	6 ft 4 in (1.93 m)	195 lb (88 kg)	Jr	The Winchendon School	Carmel, New York
G	15	Kevin Egee	6 ft 3 in (1.91 m)	175 lb (79 kg)	So	Ridley	Ridley Park, Pennsylvania
G/F	20	Tommy McMahon	6 ft 7 in (2.01 m)	210 lb (95 kg)	So	Junípero Serra	Hillsborough, California
G	21	Brian Grandieri	6 ft 4 in (1.93 m)	190 lb (86 kg)	Jr	Malvern Prep	Media, Pennsylvania
G	22	Adam Franklin	6 ft 6 in (1.98 m)	215 lb (98 kg)	Sr	Tatnall School; North Carolina	New Castle, Delaware
G/F	23	Joe Gill	6 ft 6 in (1.98 m)	180 lb (82 kg)	Jr	Germantown Academy	Doylestown, Pennsylvania
F	24	Mark Zoller	6 ft 6 in (1.98 m)	220 lb (100 kg)	Sr	St. Joseph's Prep	Blue Bell, Pennsylvania
F	33	Cameron Lewis	6 ft 8 in (2.03 m)	220 lb (100 kg)	So	Phillips Exeter Academy	Washington, D.C.
F	41	Justin Reilly	6 ft 8 in (2.03 m)	225 lb (102 kg)	Fr	Dallas Jesuit	Dallas, Texas
F	42	Brennan Votel	6 ft 7 in (2.01 m)	215 lb (98 kg)	So	Covington Catholic	Park Hills, Kentucky

Head coach

- Glen Miller (Northeastern)

Assistant coach(es)

- Chris Sparks (Southern Maine)
- Mike Martin (Brown)
- Perry Bromwell (Penn)

Legend

- (C) Team captain
- (S) Suspended
- (I) Ineligible
- (W) Walk-on
- Injured
- Current redshirt

Roster

== Schedule and results ==
Date time, TV	Rank^{#}	Opponent^{#}	Result	Record	Site (attendance) city, state
Regular season
Nov 10, 2006*		vs. UTEP; Black Coaches Association Invitational	L 66–69	0–1	Carrier Dome; Syracuse, New York
Nov 11, 2006*		at No. 20 Syracuse; Black Coaches Association Invitational	L 60–78	0–2	Carrier Dome; Syracuse, New York
Nov 12, 2006*; 3:30 p.m.		vs. St. Francis (NY); Black Coaches Association Invitational	W 86–56	1–2	Carrier Dome; Syracuse, New York
Nov 18, 2006*		Florida Gulf Coast	W 97–74	2–2	The Palestra; Philadelphia, Pennsylvania
Nov 21, 2006*; 8:00 p.m., CN8		Drexel; Battle of 33rd Street	W 68–49	3–2	The Palestra (5,268); Philadelphia, Pennsylvania
Nov 28, 2006*		Monmouth	W 80–66	4–2	The Palestra; Philadelphia, Pennsylvania
Dec 2, 2006*		Villanova	L 89–99	4–3	The Palestra; Philadelphia, Pennsylvania
Dec 7, 2006*		at Navy	W 79–58	5–3	Alumni Hall; Annapolis, Maryland
Dec 9, 2006*		Fordham	L 60–77	5–4	The Palestra; Philadelphia, Pennsylvania
Dec 21, 2006*		Illinois-Chicago	W 90–78	6–4	The Palestra; Philadelphia, Pennsylvania
Dec 23, 2006*		at Seton Hall	L 85–94	6–5	Continental Airlines Arena; East Rutherford, New Jersey
Jan 3, 2007*; 8:00 p.m., ESPN		at No. 2 North Carolina	L 64–102	6–6	Dean Smith Center (19,378); Chapel Hill, North Carolina
Jan 6, 2007*		at Elon	W 66–64	7–6	Alumni Gym; Elon, North Carolina
Jan 12, 2007		at Cornell	W 74–56	8–6 (1–0)	Newman Arena; Ithaca, New York
Jan 13, 2007		at Columbia	W 69–43	9–6 (2–0)	Levien Gymnasium; New York, New York
Jan 18, 2007*		at La Salle	W 93–92	10–6	Tom Gola Arena; Philadelphia, Pennsylvania
Jan 24, 2007*		Temple	W 76–74	11–6	The Palestra; Philadelphia, Pennsylvania
Jan 27, 2007*		Saint Joseph's	L 74–84	11–7	The Palestra; Philadelphia, Pennsylvania
Feb 2, 2007		at Brown	W 77–61	12–7 (3–0)	Pizzitola Sports Center; Providence, Rhode Island
Feb 3, 2007		at Yale	L 68–77	12–8 (3–1)	John J. Lee Amphitheater; New Haven, Connecticut
Feb 9, 2007		Dartmouth	W 73–53	13–8 (4–1)	The Palestra; Philadelphia, Pennsylvania
Feb 10, 2007		Harvard	W 67–53	14–8 (5–1)	The Palestra; Philadelphia, Pennsylvania
Feb 13, 2007		Princeton	W 48–35	15–8 (6–1)	The Palestra; Philadelphia, Pennsylvania
Feb 16, 2007		Columbia	W 73–54	16–8 (7–1)	The Palestra; Philadelphia, Pennsylvania
Feb 17, 2007		Cornell	W 83–71	17–8 (8–1)	The Palestra; Philadelphia, Pennsylvania
Feb 23, 2007		at Harvard	W 83–67	18–8 (9–1)	Lavietes Pavilion; Cambridge, Massachusetts
Feb 24, 2007		at Dartmouth	W 80–78	19–8 (10–1)	Leede Arena; Hanover, New Hampshire
Mar 2, 2007		Yale	W 86–58	20–8 (11–1)	The Palestra; Philadelphia, Pennsylvania
Mar 3, 2007		Brown	W 67–64	21–8 (12–1)	The Palestra; Philadelphia, Pennsylvania
Mar 6, 2007		at Princeton	W 64–48	22–8 (13–1)	Jadwin Gymnasium; Princeton, New Jersey
NCAA tournament
Mar 15, 2007*; CBS	(14 S)	vs. (3 S) No. 9 Texas A&M; First Round	L 52–68	22–9	Rupp Arena (20,816); Lexington, Kentucky
*Non-conference game. ^{#}Rankings from AP Poll. (#) Tournament seedings in parentheses. S=South. All times are in Eastern Time.

== Awards and honors ==
- Ibrahim Jaaber – Ivy League Player of the Year
