= 2005–06 Ivy League men's basketball season =

Basketball season in 2000s

The 2005–06 Ivy League men's basketball season was the Ivy League's 52nd season of basketball. The Penn Quakers had the best record, and progressed to the 2006 NCAA Division I men's basketball tournament, where they lost in the first round. Ibrahim Jaaber, who played point guard for Penn, won the Ivy League Men's Basketball Player of the Year. He averaged 18.2 points, 3.4 rebounds, 3.3 steals, and 2.2 assists.

== Standings ==
2005–06 Ivy League men's basketball standings
	Conf.				Overall
Team	W		L	PCT	W		L	PCT
Penn	12	–	2	.857	20	–	8	.714
Princeton	10	–	4	.714	12	–	15	.444
Cornell	8	–	6	.571	13	–	15	.464
Yale	7	–	7	.500	15	–	14	.517
Brown	6	–	8	.429	10	–	17	.370
Harvard	5	–	9	.357	13	–	14	.481
Columbia	4	–	10	.286	11	–	16	.407
Dartmouth	4	–	10	.286	6	–	21	.222
