= 1995–96 Penn Quakers men's basketball team =

American college basketball season

1995–96 Penn Quakers men's basketball

Ivy League regular-season co-champions
- Conference: Ivy League
- Record: 17–10 (12–2 Ivy)
- Head coach: Fran Dunphy (7th season)
- Home arena: The Palestra

1995–96 Ivy League men's basketball standings
	Conf.				Overall
Team	W		L	PCT	W		L	PCT
Princeton	12	–	2	.857	22	–	7	.759
Penn	12	–	2	.857	17	–	10	.630
Dartmouth	9	–	5	.643	16	–	10	.615
Harvard	7	–	7	.500	15	–	11	.577
Brown	5	–	9	.357	10	–	16	.385
Cornell	5	–	9	.357	10	–	16	.385
Yale	3	–	11	.214	8	–	18	.308
Columbia	3	–	11	.214	7	–	19	.269
Rankings from AP Poll

The 1995–96 Penn Quakers men's basketball team represented the University of Pennsylvania during the 1995–96 NCAA Division I men's basketball season. The Quakers, led by 7th-year head coach Fran Dunphy, played their home games at The Palestra as members of the Ivy League. They finished the season 17–10, 12–2 in Ivy League play to tie for the regular-season conference championship. They lost in a playoff for the Ivy League's automatic bid to the NCAA tournament, 63–56 in OT, to Princeton – a team they had beaten twice in conference play.

Though they did not reach the NCAA Tournament, this marked the fourth straight season the Quakers finished atop the Ivy League regular-season standings.

== Roster ==
1995–96 Penn Quakers men's basketball team
Players
Coaches

Pos.	#	Name	Height	Weight	Year	Previous school	Hometown
F		Ira Bowman	6 ft 5 in (1.96 m)	190 lb (86 kg)	Sr	Providence	Newark, New Jersey
		Dan Leibovitz	—	—	Sr
F	23	Tim Krug	6 ft 5 in (1.96 m)	—	Sr

Head coach

- Fran Dunphy

Assistant coach(es)

Legend

- (C) Team captain
- (S) Suspended
- (I) Ineligible
- (W) Walk-on
- Injured
- Current redshirt

Roster

== Schedule and results ==
Date time, TV	Rank^{#}	Opponent^{#}	Result	Record	Site (attendance) city, state
Non-conference regular season
Nov 27, 1995*		USC	L 78–80	0–1	Palestra; Philadelphia, Pennsylvania
Dec 2, 1995*		at Saint Louis	L 51–58	0–2	Kiel Center; St. Louis, Missouri
Dec 6, 1995*		at Towson State	W 67–61	1–2	Towson Center; Towson, Maryland
Dec 9, 1995*		vs. Penn State	L 65–77	1–3	Convention Hall; Philadelphia, Pennsylvania
Dec 29, 1995*		vs. Detroit Mercy	L 65–77	1–4	ASU Activity Center; Tempe, Arizona
Dec 30, 1995*		vs. SMU	L 67–79	1–5	ASU Activity Center; Tempe, Arizona
Ivy League regular season
Jan 6, 1996		at Princeton	W 57–55	2–5 (1–0)	Jadwin Gymnasium; Princeton, New Jersey
Jan 12, 1996		Brown	W 74–71	3–5 (2–0)	Palestra; Philadelphia, Pennsylvania
Jan 13, 1996		Yale	W 66–56	4–5 (3–0)	Palestra; Philadelphia, Pennsylvania
Jan 16, 1996*		vs. Saint Joseph's	L 70–86	4–6	The Spectrum; Philadelphia, Pennsylvania
Jan 22, 1996*		Lafayette	W 74–57	5–6	Palestra; Philadelphia, Pennsylvania
Feb 2, 1996		Cornell	W 77–63	8–6 (4–0)	Palestra; Philadelphia, Pennsylvania
Feb 3, 1996		Columbia	W 74–50	9–6 (5–0)	Palestra; Philadelphia, Pennsylvania
Feb 6, 1996*		Lehigh	W 90–73	10–6	Palestra; Philadelphia, Pennsylvania
Feb 9, 1996		at Dartmouth	L 53–54	10–7 (5–1)	Leede Arena; Hanover, New Hampshire
Feb 10, 1996		at Harvard	W 77–63	11–7 (6–1)	Lavietes Pavilion; Cambridge, Massachusetts
Feb 16, 1996		at Yale	L 60–62	11–8 (6–2)	Payne Whitney Gymnasium; New Haven, Connecticut
Feb 17, 1996		at Brown	W 83–53	12–8 (7–2)	Pizzitola Sports Center; Providence, Rhode Island
Feb 20, 1996*		Temple	L 42–53	12–9	Palestra; Philadelphia, Pennsylvania
Feb 23, 1996		Harvard	W 66–64	13–9 (8–2)	Palestra; Philadelphia, Pennsylvania
Feb 24, 1996		Dartmouth	W 80–51	14–9 (9–2)	Palestra; Philadelphia, Pennsylvania
Mar 1, 1996		at Columbia	W 82–62	15–9 (10–2)	Levien Gymnasium; New York, New York
Mar 2, 1996		at Cornell	W 70–55	16–9 (11–2)	Newman Arena; Ithaca, New York
Mar 5, 1996		Princeton	W 63–49	17–9 (12–2)	Palestra; Philadelphia, Pennsylvania
Ivy League Playoff
Mar 9, 1996*		vs. Princeton	L 56–63 ^{OT}	17–10	Stabler Arena; Bethlehem, Pennsylvania
*Non-conference game. ^{#}Rankings from AP Poll. (#) Tournament seedings in parentheses. All times are in Eastern Time.

== Awards and honors ==
- Ira Bowman – Ivy League Player of the Year
