= 1998–99 Penn Quakers men's basketball team =

American college basketball season

1998–99 Penn Quakers men's basketball

Ivy League champions

NCAA tournament, first round
- Conference: Ivy League
- Record: 21–6 (13–1 Ivy)
- Head coach: Fran Dunphy (10th season)
- Assistant coach: Dave Duke
- Home arena: The Palestra

1998–99 Ivy League men's basketball standings
	Conf.				Overall
Team	W		L	PCT	W		L	PCT
Penn	13	–	1	.929	21	–	6	.778
Princeton	11	–	3	.786	22	–	8	.733
Dartmouth	10	–	4	.714	14	–	12	.538
Harvard	7	–	7	.500	13	–	13	.500
Cornell	6	–	8	.429	11	–	15	.423
Columbia	5	–	9	.357	10	–	16	.385
Brown	2	–	12	.143	4	–	22	.154
Yale	2	–	12	.143	4	–	22	.154
Rankings from AP Poll

The 1998–99 Penn Quakers men's basketball team represented the University of Pennsylvania during the 1998–99 NCAA Division I men's basketball season. The Quakers, led by 10th-year head coach Fran Dunphy, played their home games at The Palestra as members of the Ivy League. They finished the season 21–6, 13–1 in Ivy League play to win the regular season championship. They received the Ivy League's automatic bid to the NCAA tournament where they lost in the First round to Florida.

== Roster ==
1998–99 Penn Quakers men's basketball team
Players
Coaches

Pos.	#	Name	Height	Weight	Year	Previous school	Hometown
G	20	Matt Langel	6 ft 5 in (1.96 m)	—	Jr
G	23	Michael-Hakim Jordan	6 ft 0 in (1.83 m)	—	Jr	Abington	Philadelphia, Pennsylvania
F	51	Geoff Owens	6 ft 11 in (2.11 m)	—	Jr

Head coach

- Fran Dunphy (Ursinus)

Assistant coach(es)

- Dave Duke (Villanova)

Legend

- (C) Team captain
- (S) Suspended
- (I) Ineligible
- (W) Walk-on
- Injured
- Current redshirt

Roster

== Schedule and results ==
Date time, TV	Rank^{#}	Opponent^{#}	Result	Record	Site (attendance) city, state
Non-conference regular season
Nov 17, 1998*		No. 8 Kansas	L 56–61	0–1	The Palestra; Philadelphia, Pennsylvania
Nov 23, 1998*		No. 6 Temple	W 73–70 ^{OT}	1–1	The Palestra; Philadelphia, Pennsylvania
Dec 3, 1998*		Lehigh	W 73–56	2–1	The Palestra; Philadelphia, Pennsylvania
Dec 12, 1998*		at Penn State	L 55–71	2–2	Bryce Jordan Center; University Park, Pennsylvania
Dec 26, 1998*		vs. Iona; ECAC/MSG Holiday Festival	W 67–61	3–2	Madison Square Garden; New York, New York
Dec 27, 1998*		vs. Hofstra; ECAC/MSG Holiday Festival	L 62–67	3–3	Madison Square Garden; New York, New York
Jan 5, 1999*		at Lafayette	W 74–62	4–3	Allan P. Kirby Field House; Easton, Pennsylvania
Ivy League regular season
Jan 8, 1999		Yale	W 68–62	5–3 (1–0)	The Palestra; Philadelphia, Pennsylvania
Jan 9, 1999		Brown	W 86–55	6–3 (2–0)	The Palestra; Philadelphia, Pennsylvania
Jan 14, 1999*		at La Salle	W 62–58	7–3	Tom Gola Arena; Philadelphia, Pennsylvania
Jan 16, 1999*		Colgate	W 68–50	8–3	The Palestra; Philadelphia, Pennsylvania
Jan 18, 1999*		Saint Joseph's	W 66–58	9–3	The Palestra; Philadelphia, Pennsylvania
Jan 21, 1999*		Drexel; Battle of 33rd Street	W 75–65	10–3	The Palestra (4,652); Philadelphia, Pennsylvania
Jan 29, 1999		at Cornell	W 86–62	11–3 (3–0)	Newman Arena; Ithaca, New York
Jan 30, 1999		at Columbia	W 67–51	12–3 (4–0)	Levien Gymnasium; New York, New York
Feb 5, 1999		Dartmouth	W 79–67	13–3 (5–0)	The Palestra; Philadelphia, Pennsylvania
Feb 6, 1999		Harvard	W 81–56	14–3 (6–0)	The Palestra; Philadelphia, Pennsylvania
Feb 9, 1999		Princeton	L 49–50	14–4 (6–1)	The Palestra; Philadelphia, Pennsylvania
Feb 12, 1999		at Brown	W 73–57	15–4 (7–1)	Pizzitola Sports Center; Providence, Rhode Island
Feb 13, 1999		at Yale	W 71–50	16–4 (8–1)	John J. Lee Amphitheater; New Haven, Connecticut
Feb 19, 1999		at Harvard	W 81–76	17–4 (9–1)	Lavietes Pavilion; Cambridge, Massachusetts
Feb 20, 1999		at Dartmouth	W 82–49	18–4 (10–1)	Leede Arena; Hanover, New Hampshire
Feb 23, 1999*		at Villanova	L 63–74	18–5	First Union Center; Philadelphia, Pennsylvania
Feb 26, 1999		Columbia	W 87–48	19–5 (11–1)	The Palestra; Philadelphia, Pennsylvania
Feb 27, 1999		Cornell	W 83–81	20–5 (12–1)	The Palestra; Philadelphia, Pennsylvania
Mar 2, 1999		at Princeton	W 73–48	21–5 (13–1)	Jadwin Gymnasium; Princeton, New Jersey
NCAA tournament
Mar 11, 1999*	(11 W)	vs. (6 W) No. 23 Florida; First round	L 61–75	21–6	KeyArena; Seattle, Washington
*Non-conference game. ^{#}Rankings from AP Poll. (#) Tournament seedings in parentheses. W=West. All times are in Eastern Time.
