= 1950–51 Penn Quakers men's basketball team =

American college basketball season

1950–51 Penn Quakers men's basketball
- Conference: Eastern Intercollegiate Basketball League
- Record: 19–8 (7–5 EIBL)
- Head coach: Howard Dallmar
- Home arena: The Palestra

1950–51 Eastern Intercollegiate Basketball League standings
	Conf.				Overall
Team	W		L	PCT	W		L	PCT
No. 3 Columbia	12	–	0	1.000	21	–	1	.955
Cornell	10	–	2	.833	20	–	5	.800
Penn	7	–	5	.583	19	–	8	.704
Princeton	5	–	7	.417	15	–	7	.682
Yale	4	–	8	.333	14	–	13	.519
Harvard	3	–	9	.250	8	–	18	.308
Dartmouth	1	–	11	.083	3	–	23	.115
Rankings from AP Poll

The 1950–51 Penn Quakers men's basketball team was a college basketball team that represented the University of Pennsylvania in the 1950–51 NCAA men's basketball season. The Quakers, coached by Howard Dallmar, played in the Eastern Intercollegiate Basketball League and had a 19–8 win–loss record. The team's 19 win season was the most wins for the program since the 1929–30 Penn Quakers men's basketball team that won 20 games.

== Roster ==
1950–51 Penn Quakers men's basketball team
Players
Coaches

Pos.	#	Name	Height	Weight	Year	Previous school	Hometown
G/F		Ernie Beck	6 ft 4 in (1.93 m)	—
G		Don Scanlon	6 ft 1 in (1.85 m)	—
G		Bob Brooks	5 ft 10 in (1.78 m)	—
F		Tom Davis	6 ft 1 in (1.85 m)	—
G		Tom Holt	5 ft 10 in (1.78 m)	—
G		Dick Dougherty	5 ft 9 in (1.75 m)	—
F		Hugh Jeffries	5 ft 11 in (1.8 m)	—
		Dick Harter	6 ft 1 in (1.85 m)	—
F		Dave Blaetz	6 ft 1 in (1.85 m)	—

Head coach

- Howard Dallmar

Assistant coach(es)

Legend

- (C) Team captain
- (S) Suspended
- (I) Ineligible
- (W) Walk-on
- Injured
- Current redshirt
