= Glen Miller (basketball) =

American basketball coach (born 1961)

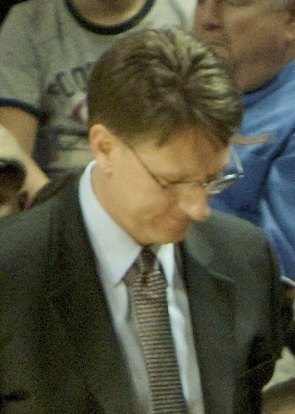
- Miller in 2009.

Current position
- Title: Head coach
- Team: St. Joseph (CT)

Biographical details
- Born: August 20, 1961 (age 65)
- Education: UConn

Coaching career (HC unless noted)
- 1986–1993: UConn (assistant)
- 1993–1999: Connecticut College
- 1999–2006: Brown
- 2006–2009: Penn
- 2010–2017: UConn (assoc. HC)
- 2018–2021: Saint Joseph (CT) (assoc. HC)
- 2021–present: Saint Joseph (CT)

Head coaching record
- Overall: 313–218

Accomplishments and honors

Championships
- NESCAC Sweet Sixteen (1998) NESCAC Final Four (1999) Ivy League NIT First Round (2003) Ivy League NCAA First Round (2007) Ivy League Regular Season Champions (2007) GNAC Tournament Champions (2022) GNAC NCAA First Round (2022) GNAC Regular Season Champions (2022) GNAC NCAA Sweet Sixteen (2023) GNAC Regular Season Champions (2023) GNAC NCAA Second Round (2024) GNAC Regular Season Champions (2024) GNAC Tournament Champions (2024)

Glen Miller (born August 20, 1961) is an American basketball coach, currently the head coach at University of Saint Joseph (Connecticut). He is the former head men's basketball coach at the University of Pennsylvania and Brown University and associate head coach at the University of Connecticut.

== Head coaching record ==
Record table
| Season | Team | Overall | Conference | Standing | Postseason |
|---|---|---|---|---|---|
Connecticut College Camels (NESCAC) (1993–1999)
| 1993–94 | Connecticut College | 6–18 | | | |
| 1994–95 | Connecticut College | 4–20 | | | |
| 1995–96 | Connecticut College | 18–8 | | | |
| 1996–97 | Connecticut College | 17–7 | | | |
| 1997–98 | Connecticut College | 22–4 | 9–1 | 1st | NCAA Division III Sweet Sixteen |
| 1998–99 | Connecticut College | 28–1 | 10–0 | 1st | NCAA Division III Final Four |
| Connecticut College: | | 95–58 (.621) | | | |
Brown Bears (Ivy League) (1999–2006)
| 1999–00 | Brown | 8–19 | 4–10 | 7th | |
| 2000–01 | Brown | 15–12 | 9–5 | 2nd | |
| 2001–02 | Brown | 17–10 | 8–6 | 4th | |
| 2002–03 | Brown | 17–12 | 12–2 | 2nd | NIT First Round |
| 2003–04 | Brown | 14–13 | 10–4 | 2nd | |
| 2004–05 | Brown | 12–16 | 5–9 | 6th | |
| 2005–06 | Brown | 10–17 | 6–8 | 5th | |
| Brown: | | 93–99 (.484) | 54–44 (.551) | | |
Penn Quakers (Ivy League) (2006–2008)
| 2006–07 | Penn | 22–9 | 13–1 | 1st | NCAA First Round |
| 2007–08 | Penn | 13–18 | 8–6 | 3rd | |
| 2008–09 | Penn | 10–18 | 6–8 | T–6th | |
| 2009–10 | Penn | 0–7 | N/A | | |
| Penn: | | 45–52 (.464) | 27–15 (.643) | | |
Saint Joseph Blue Jays (GNAC) (2021–present)
| 2021–22 | Saint Joseph (CT) | 26–2 | 18–0 | 1st | NCAA Division III First Round |
| 2022–23 | Saint Joseph (CT) | 29–2 | 18–0 | 1st | NCAA Division III Sweet Sixteen |
| 2023–24 | Saint Joseph (CT) | 25–5 | 14–0 | 1st | NCAA Division III Second Round |
| 2024–25 | Saint Joseph (CT) | 19–8 | 12–2 | 2nd | |
| 2025–26 | Saint Joseph (CT) | 20–8 | 11–1 | 2nd | |
| Saint Joseph (CT): | | 119–25 (.826) | 73–3 (.961) | | |
| Total: | | 313–218 (.589) | | | |
National champion Postseason invitational champion Conference regular season champion Conference regular season and conference tournament champion Division regular season champion Division regular season and conference tournament champion Conference tournament champion
