= Bob Brooks (basketball) =

American basketball player

Personal information
- Listed height: 5 ft 10 in (1.78 m)

Career information
- High school: Atlantic City (Atlantic City, New Jersey)
- College: Penn (1949–1952)
- NBA draft: 1952: undrafted
- Position: Guard

Bob Brooks is an American former basketball and baseball player. He was a three-year starter for the Penn Quakers men's basketball team from 1949 to 1952 and a starting pitcher for the Penn Quakers baseball team, and was later inducted into the Philadelphia Jewish Sports Hall of Fame.

== Early life ==
Brooks attended Atlantic City High School in Atlantic City, New Jersey, in the late 1940s, where he played basketball and baseball.

== College career ==
Brooks played basketball and baseball at the University of Pennsylvania. A three-year starter at guard for the Quakers, he earned all-league and All-State honors as a senior. He averaged 8.8 points per game in 1949–50, 10.6 in 1950–51, and 9.7 in 1951–52, and led the team in free throw percentage (75.7) as a senior. Penn won 19 games in 1950–51 and 21 games in 1951–52 during his tenure, and his teammates included future NBA player Ernie Beck.

For the Penn baseball team, Brooks was a starting pitcher for three seasons.

Brooks was inducted into the Philadelphia Jewish Sports Hall of Fame in 2014.
