= Stan Pawlak =

American basketball player

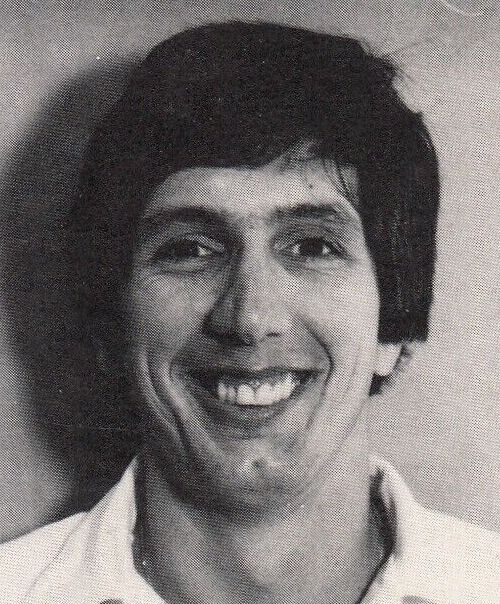
- Pawlak in 1981

Personal information
- Listed height: 6 ft 2 in (1.88 m)

Career information
- High school: Collingswood (Collingswood, New Jersey)
- College: Penn (1963–1966)
- NBA draft: 1966: undrafted
- Playing career: 1966–1976
- Position: Guard

Career history

Playing
- 1966–1967: Harrisburg Patriots
- 1967–1973: Wilkes-Barre Barons
- 1974–1975: Scranton Apollos
- 1975–1976: Wilkes-Barre Barons

Coaching
- 1980–1982: Atlantic City Hi-Rollers

Career highlights
- 2× EPBL/EBA champion (1969, 1973); EPBL Most Valuable Player (1969); 5× All-EPBL/EBA First Team (1969–1973); 3× First-team All-Ivy League (1964–1966)

Stan Pawlak Jr. (pav-lak) is an American former professional basketball player and coach. He played college basketball for the Penn Quakers and was a three-time all-Ivy League selection. Pawlak played professionally in the Eastern Professional Basketball League (EPBL) / Eastern Basketball Association (EBA) and was the EPBL Most Valuable Player in 1969.

== College career ==
Pawlak attended Collingswood High School in Collingswood, New Jersey. He was a three-time All-Ivy League selection while playing for the Penn Quakers from 1963 to 1966. Pawlak was part of a formidable duo alongside Jeff Neuman that led the Quakers to a 19–6 record and their first Ivy League championship in 1966. He led the team in scoring with 23.2 points per game during his senior season.

Pawlak averaged 20.6 points per game during his career with the Quakers which is the third highest scoring average in program history. He scored 37 points in a 1966 game against the La Salle Explorers that stands as the fourth highest in Quakers history.

Pawlak also participated in track and field for the Quakers and was a co-captain of the 1966 team.

== Professional career ==
Pawlak was invited by Philadelphia 76ers general manager, Jack Ramsay to attend training camp with the 76ers after he performed well during the summer league in 1967. The 76ers ultimately returned most of their players from their 1966–67 championship team and Pawlak was unable to break into the roster.

Pavlak played for ten seasons in the Eastern Professional Basketball League (EPBL) / Eastern Basketball Association (EBA) with the Harrisburg Patriots, Wilkes-Barre Barons and Scranton Apollos. He won EPBL/EBA championships with the Barons in 1969 and 1973. He was the EPBL Most Valuable Player in 1969 and was a five-time all-league first team selection. Pawlak led the league in scoring twice (736 in 1968–69 and 819 in 1972–73) and assists three times (142 in 1970–71, 142 in 1971–72 and 227 in 1972–73).

== Post-playing career ==
Pawlak served as a coach of the basketball teams at Woodrow Wilson High School in Camden, New Jersey, where he was an assistant to Gary Williams on the varsity team and the head coach of the junior varsity team.

Pawlak was the head coach of the Atlantic City Hi-Rollers of the Continental Basketball Association from 1980 to 1982 and amassed a 31–34 record. He had a stint coaching in Saudi Arabia.

Pawlak has been a broadcaster for the Penn Quakers radio team.

== Personal life ==
Pawlak's father, Stan Sr., worked as a coach at Woodrow Wilson High School after playing baseball and football at the school as a student. His sister, Patricia, is a film producer.
