= Fran Dunphy =

American basketball coach (born 1948)

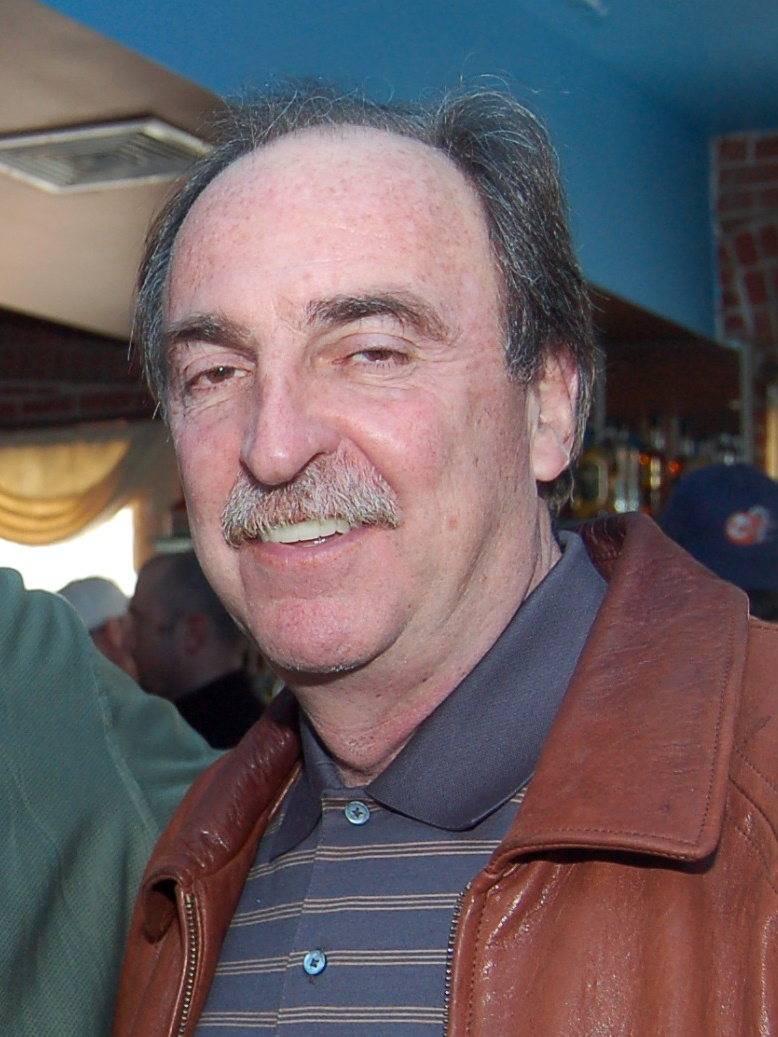

Biographical details
- Born: October 5, 1948 (age 78); Drexel Hill, Pennsylvania, U.S.

Playing career
- 1967–1970: La Salle
- 1973–1975: Cherry Hill Rookies

Coaching career (HC unless noted)
- 1971–1975: Army (assistant)
- 1977–1979: Malvern Prep
- 1979–1980: La Salle (assistant)
- 1980–1984: American (assistant)
- 1985–1988: La Salle (assistant)
- 1988–1989: Penn (assistant)
- 1989–2006: Penn
- 2006–2019: Temple
- 2022–2025: La Salle

Administrative career (AD unless noted)
- 2020–2021: Temple (interim)
- 2025–present: La Salle (special assistant to the president)

Head coaching record
- Overall: 625–380 (.622) (college)
- Tournaments: 3–17 (NCAA Division I); 3–2 (NIT)

Accomplishments and honors

Championships
- 10 Ivy League regular season (1993–1996, 1999, 2000, 2002, 2003, 2005, 2006); 3 Atlantic 10 tournament (2008–2010); 2 Atlantic 10 regular season (2010, 2012); AAC regular season (2016)

Awards
- 2× Atlantic 10 Coach of the Year (2010, 2012); 2× AAC Coach of the Year (2015, 2016)

Francis Joseph Dunphy (born October 5, 1948) is an American former college basketball coach. He served as the head coach at the University of Pennsylvania for 17 seasons, Temple University for 13 seasons, and La Salle University for three seasons. Originally starting at Penn in 1989, Dunphy led the school to ten Ivy League championships. He was hired at Temple to succeed John Chaney in 2006, spending 13 seasons with the program and making eight NCAA tournament appearances. After a brief stint as Temple's interim athletic director, in 2022, Dunphy was named head coach of the La Salle Explorers, his alma mater, where he coached for three seasons until his retirement in 2025.

Nicknamed "Mr. Big 5", Dunphy holds the record for the most career wins (625) by a coach in Philadelphia Big 5 history and has coached three of the six member schools in the city series. He is considered one of the greatest head coaches in Ivy League history, with his 317 wins and ten conference titles with Penn, second only to former Princeton head coach Pete Carril.

== Education ==
Dunphy attended St. Dorothy's grade school in Drexel Hill, Pennsylvania, and then went on to attend Malvern Preparatory School in Malvern, Pennsylvania. He graduated from La Salle University in 1970 with a degree in marketing. In 1979, he earned a master's degree in counseling and human relations from Villanova University. In addition, he completed his coursework toward his doctorate in counseling and student development at American University.

== Playing career ==
=== College ===
Dunphy played college basketball at La Salle from 1967–1970. While at La Salle, he played under head coach Tom Gola. As a junior, he helped the Explorers to a 23–1 record and a number 2 finish in the final AP Poll. He served as a co-captain his senior year when he averaged 18.6 ppg and led the team in assists, while also being named the MVP of the annual Quaker City Basketball Tournament. Dunphy scored 24 points in the championship game against Columbia.

=== Professional ===
Dunphy played for the Cherry Hill Rookies of the Eastern Basketball Association from 1973 to 1975. He averaged 8.4 points, 2.7 rebounds and 2.0 assists in 23 games played.

== Coaching career ==
Dunphy's coaching career began at the United States Military Academy (1971–72), where he served as an assistant under head coach Dan Dougherty. In 1977 he became the head basketball coach and accounting teacher of his high school alma mater, Malvern Prep. He remained there until becoming Lefty Ervin's assistant at La Salle University (1979–80). The following year, Dunphy joined Gary Williams’ staff at American University. He returned to La Salle in 1985, serving one more season under Ervin and assisting Speedy Morris for two seasons. He left La Salle to become head coach Tom Schneider's top assistant at Penn in 1988. Dunphy succeeded Schneider as Penn head coach a year later. In 2006 he succeeded John Chaney as head coach of the Temple Owls.

=== Penn ===
In 1989, Dunphy was named the 16th head coach at Penn. He compiled a 310–163 overall record and won 10 Ivy League titles in his 17-year career. Dunphy's 310 wins are the most by any Penn coach and are second all-time in the Ivy League to Princeton's Pete Carril. His Quaker teams won 48 straight Ivy League games and four league titles from 1992 through 1996. His 1993–94 team had a 25–3 record and was ranked 25th in the CNN/USA Today Coaches’ Poll, the program's first such ranking since 1978–79. In 1994, Penn upset sixth-seeded Nebraska 90–80 in the NCAA tournament. Dunphy is considered among the finest coaches in Ivy League history.

Dunphy vs. the Ivy League

- Brown 28–6
- Columbia 28–6
- Cornell 30–4
- Dartmouth 30–4
- Harvard 29–5
- Princeton 20–15
- Yale 26–9

=== Temple ===
Dunphy was introduced as the head coach at Temple on April 10, 2006 after legendary Owls coach John Chaney retired the previous month. By taking the job, Dunphy became the first man ever to lead two Big 5 basketball programs.

In 2008, Dunphy coached Temple to the Atlantic 10 tournament championship. He also won the Herb Good Eastern Coach of the Year Award for the 2007–08 season. They lost a close game to Michigan State (who advanced to the Sweet Sixteen) in the first round of the 2008 NCAA tournament. The 2009 team placed 2nd in the A10 conference for the second straight season. The Owls repeated as Atlantic 10 tournament champions 2009; Temple University is the first A10 team to repeat as A10 tournament champions since TU accomplished this task under the reign of John Chaney 2000–01. Dunphy's 2009–10 Temple team won 11 of its first 13 games, including a victory over cross-town rival and then-third ranked Villanova, before falling to top-ranked Kansas. The 2009–10 team also ranked in the top twenty-five for more than eleven straight weeks in both major polls, and won its third consecutive Atlantic 10 tournament title. However, for the third straight season, Dunphy's Owls lost in the first round of NCAA tournament, this time to Ivy League champion Cornell.

Dunphy would finally claim his first NCAA tournament victory at Temple in the 2010–11 season when Temple knocked off intra-state rival Penn St. 66–64 in the second round on a last-second buzzer-beater by sophomore Juan Fernandez. Temple would lose in the following round to 2-seed San Diego State 71–64 in a gut-wrenching double-overtime thriller. Dunphy would lead the Owls back to the tournament in the 2011–12 season, only to be upset in the second round by South Florida 58–44. In the following season after losing senior guards Juan Fernandez and Ramone Moore, Dunphy led the Owls to an early-season upset of then 3-seed Syracuse – a team that eventually made the Final Four – at Madison Square Garden and #21 VCU on the final day of the regular season to secure a 6th straight NCAA tournament appearance. The Owls would knock off 8-seed North Carolina State 76–72 in the second round before losing to 1-seed Indiana 58–52 in a game that Temple led the majority of the way.

After placing 9th and a tie for 3rd in their first two years in the American Athletic Conference, the Temple Owls won the 2015–16 regular season AAC title with a 14–4 conference record. For the second straight year, Dunphy won AAC Coach of the Year honors for exceeding pre-season expectations (before both the 2014–15 and 2015–16 seasons, Temple was projected to come in 6th in the AAC. They came in a tie for 3rd and 1st respectively).

On April 12, 2018, it was announced that Dunphy would step down as Temple head coach at the end of the 2018–19 season, with assistant coach and former Owl player Aaron McKie succeeding him.

Dunphy was named interim athletic director of Temple University, effective July 1, 2020. He replaced Pat Kraft, who left to take the position at Boston College. Dunphy was replaced in this position by Arthur Johnson.

=== La Salle ===
On April 5, 2022, The Philadelphia Inquirer reported that the La Salle would hire Dunphy to be the Explorers' next men's basketball coach. With his hiring, Dunphy returned to coach at his alma mater and became the first coach to lead three different Big 5 programs. He replaced Ashley Howard in this position.

On November 26, 2023, Dunphy won his 600th career game, an 81–62 win over Coppin State.

On February 20, 2025, Dunphy announced he would retire from coaching at the conclusion of the 2024–25 season and become a special assistant to the president at La Salle.

On February 26, 2025, Dunphy coached his 1,000th career game, a 62–67 defeat to Duquesne. Dunphy was honored in a pregame ceremony.

On March 8, 2025, Dunphy coached the final regular season home game of his career, an 81–74 win over Saint Joseph's. Prior to the game Dunphy was honored by Pennsylvania Governor Josh Shapiro. Shapiro presented Dunphy with a proclamation deeming March 8 Fran Dunphy day at John Glaser Arena in front of a sold-out crowd.

== Personal ==
Dunphy and his wife, Ree, reside in Villanova, Pennsylvania with their son, J.P. Dunphy.

== Head coaching record ==
Record table
Season	Team	Overall	Conference	Standing	Postseason
Penn Quakers (Ivy League) (1989–2006)
1989–90	Penn	12–14	7–7	T–3rd	
1990–91	Penn	9–17	6–8	T–3rd	
1991–92	Penn	16–10	9–5	2nd	
1992–93	Penn	22–5	14–0	1st	NCAA Division I Round of 64
1993–94	Penn	25–3	14–0	1st	NCAA Division I Round of 32
1994–95	Penn	22–6	14–0	1st	NCAA Division I Round of 64
1995–96	Penn	17–10	12–3	T–1st	
1996–97	Penn	12–14	8–6	4th	
1997–98	Penn	17–12	10–4	2nd	
1998–99	Penn	21–6	13–1	1st	NCAA Division I Round of 64
1999–00	Penn	21–8	14–0	1st	NCAA Division I Round of 64
2000–01	Penn	12–17	9–5	T–2nd	
2001–02	Penn	25–7	12–3	T–1st	NCAA Division I Round of 64
2002–03	Penn	22–6	14–0	1st	NCAA Division I Round of 64
2003–04	Penn	17–10	10–4	T–2nd	
2004–05	Penn	20–9	13–1	1st	NCAA Division I Round of 64
2005–06	Penn	20–9	12–2	1st	NCAA Division I Round of 64
Penn:		310–163 (.655)	191–48 (.799)		
Temple Owls (Atlantic 10 Conference) (2006–2013)
2006–07	Temple	12–18	6–10	10th	
2007–08	Temple	21–13	11–5	T–2nd	NCAA Division I Round of 64
2008–09	Temple	22–12	11–5	T–2nd	NCAA Division I Round of 64
2009–10	Temple	29–6	14–2	1st	NCAA Division I Round of 64
2010–11	Temple	26–8	14–2	2nd	NCAA Division I Round of 32
2011–12	Temple	24–8	13–3	1st	NCAA Division I Round of 64
2012–13	Temple	24–10	11–5	T–3rd	NCAA Division I Round of 32
Temple Owls (American Athletic Conference) (2013–2019)
2013–14	Temple	9–22	4–14	9th	
2014–15	Temple	26–11	13–5	T–3rd	NIT Semifinal
2015–16	Temple	21–12	14–4	1st	NCAA Division I Round of 64
2016–17	Temple	16–16	7–11	8th	
2017–18	Temple	17–16	8–10	7th	NIT First Round
2018–19	Temple	23–10	13–5	3rd	NCAA Division I First Four
Temple:		270–162 (.625)	139–81 (.632)		
LaSalle Explorers (Atlantic 10 Conference) (2022–2025)
2022–23	La Salle	15–19	7–11	T–11th	
2023–24	La Salle	16–17	6–12	T–10th	
2024–25	La Salle	14–19	5–13	T–13th	
La Salle:		45–55 (.450)	18–36 (.333)		
Total:		625–380 (.622)			
National champion Postseason invitational champion Conference regular season champion Conference regular season and conference tournament champion Division regular season champion Division regular season and conference tournament champion Conference tournament champion

== Coaching tree ==
Assistant coaches under Dunphy who became NCAA or NBA head coaches

- Matt Langel - Colgate (2011–present)
- Aaron McKie - Temple (2019–2023)
- Dwayne Killings - Albany (2021–present)
- Steve Donahue - Cornell (2000–2010), Boston College (2010–2014), Penn (2015–2025), Saint Joseph's (2025–present)
