= Jerome Allen (basketball) =

American basketball player and coach

Detroit Pistons
- Title: Assistant coach
- League: NBA

Personal information
- Born: January 28, 1973 (age 53) Philadelphia, Pennsylvania, U.S.
- Listed height: 6 ft 4 in (1.93 m)
- Listed weight: 184 lb (83 kg)

Career information
- High school: Episcopal Academy (Merion, Pennsylvania)
- College: Penn (1991–1995)
- NBA draft: 1995: 2nd round, 49th overall pick
- Drafted by: Minnesota Timberwolves
- Playing career: 1995–2009
- Position: Point guard
- Number: 53
- Coaching career: 2009–present

Career history

Playing
- 1995–1996: Minnesota Timberwolves
- 1996–1997: Indiana Pacers
- 1997: Denver Nuggets
- 1997–1999: CSP Limoges
- 1999–2000: Ülkerspor
- 2000–2002: Virtus Roma
- 2002–2003: Tau Cerámica
- 2003: Snaidero Cucine Udine
- 2003–2005: Napoli
- 2006: PAOK Thessaloniki
- 2006–2008: Snaidero Cucine Udine
- 2008–2009: Veroli Basket
- 2009: Snaidero Cucine Udine

Coaching
- 2009: Snaidero Cucine Udine
- 2009–2015: Penn
- 2015–2021: Boston Celtics (assistant)
- 2021–2023 2024–present: Detroit Pistons (assistant)

Career highlights
- Italian Supercup MVP (2000); 2× Ivy League Player of the Year (1992, 1993)

Career NBA statistics
- Points: 336 (2.9 ppg)
- Rebounds: 123 (1.1 rpg)
- Assists: 201 (1.7 apg)
- Stats at NBA.com
- Stats at Basketball Reference
Medals
Men's basketball
Representing United States
Goodwill Games
Bronze medal – third place	1994 St. Petersburg	National team

Jerome Byron Allen (born January 28, 1973) is an American former professional basketball player and college head coach. He is the former head coach for the University of Pennsylvania men's basketball team, until resigning after the 2014–15 season. He most recently served as an assistant coach for the Detroit Pistons of the National Basketball Association (NBA).

== Early life ==
Allen was born in Philadelphia, Pennsylvania on January 28, 1973. His family struggled to make ends meet, and he lived with 18 relatives in a five-bedroom home, sharing a bed with his sister. Some of his family members sold crack cocaine, and his father left his family at age 10. He attended public school in his youth but attended Episcopal Academy for high school. He became one of the top high school basketball players in the country at Episcopal, receiving scholarship offers at 16 schools. He chose to attend Penn to study accounting at the Wharton School; he had planned on being an accountant in his youth.

== College playing career ==
Allen was a four-year starter at Penn alongside future NBA players Matt Maloney and Ira Bowman. Allen and the Quakers were undefeated from his freshman season to his junior season in the Ivy League. The team's 48-game conference winning streak is the best in Ivy League history. He averaged 13.7 points per game in his career for Penn.

== Professional playing career ==
=== Minnesota Timberwolves ===
Allen was selected 49th overall (2nd round, pick 20) by the Minnesota Timberwolves in the 1995 NBA draft. Until Miye Oni was selected in 2019, Allen was the most recent Ivy League player to be drafted to the NBA. He played 41 games for the Timberwolves, averaging 2.6 points per game in 8.8 minutes per game.

=== Indiana Pacers ===
Allen signed with the Indiana Pacers for the 1996 NBA season. He played 51 games, averaging about 3 points in 14 minutes per game. He did not finish the season with the Pacers.

=== Denver Nuggets ===
Allen signed with the Denver Nuggets and played 25 games to finish the 1996 NBA season.

=== Europe ===
Allen also spent time in France, Italy (with Lottomatica Roma, Carpisa Napoli and Snaidero Udine), Greece, Spain and Turkey.

== Coaching career ==
=== Penn Quakers ===
In 2009, he became an assistant coach for the University of Pennsylvania's men's basketball team. On December 14, 2009, Allen was named interim head coach of the Penn men's basketball team after the firing of Glen Miller. On March 31, 2010, he was announced as the new permanent head coach of the Penn Men's Basketball team. He resigned his position as head coach effective on March 10, 2015.

=== Boston Celtics ===
Allen joined the Boston Celtics in 2015 under head coach Brad Stevens. Allen was one of Boston's longer-tenured assistants and was with the team for all but two seasons of the Brad Stevens era.

=== Detroit Pistons ===
In summer 2021, Allen announced he was leaving the Celtics' coaching staff to join Dwane Casey in Detroit.

== Bribery case and related NCAA sanctions ==
In October 2018, Allen pleaded guilty to accepting an $18,000 bribe in 2014 while the head coach at Penn to help a student get on the recruiting list in order to get accepted to the university. He was ordered to pay back $18,000 in addition to a $200,000 fine. He would testify on behalf of the federal government against the man he said had bribed him – Philip Esformes. During Esformes's trial, Allen testified that he had received about $300,000 in bribes from Esformes, and that the student in question was Esformes's son.

On February 26, 2020, the NCAA announced penalties against Allen and the Penn men's basketball program stemming from the bribes. The program was placed on two years' probation but did not receive a postseason ban. Allen received a 15-year show-cause penalty from the NCAA, effective until February 20, 2035. It is the longest ever handed down to a (former) head coach. During this period, any school that hires Allen must "show cause" for why it should not be sanctioned for doing so. In an unusual move, if Allen gets a head coaching job after the show-cause expires, he must sit out the first half of the first season of his return. It is very difficult for a head coach to return to the collegiate ranks even after a show-cause expires, since many presidents and athletic directors are extremely reluctant to hire someone with a show-cause on his record. Only four coaches have ever worked in college basketball again after receiving a show-cause.

== Head coaching record ==
Record table
Season	Team	Overall	Conference	Standing	Postseason
Penn Quakers (Ivy League) (2009–2015)
2009–10	Penn	6–15	5–9	T–5th	
2010–11	Penn	13–15	7–7	4th	
2011–12	Penn	20–13	11–3	2nd	CBI Quarterfinals
2012–13	Penn	9–22	6–8	5th	
2013–14	Penn	8–20	5–9	6th	
2014–15	Penn	9–19	4–10	8th	
Penn:		65–104 (.385)	38–46 (.452)		
Total:		65–104 (.385)			
National champion Postseason invitational champion Conference regular season champion Conference regular season and conference tournament champion Division regular season champion Division regular season and conference tournament champion Conference tournament champion
