= Ugonna Onyekwe =

English basketball player (b. 1979)

Personal information
- Born: July 14, 1979 (age 47) Lagos, Nigeria
- Listed height: 6 ft 8 in (2.03 m)
- Listed weight: 228 lb (103 kg)

Career information
- High school: Mercersburg Academy (Mercersburg, Pennsylvania)
- College: Penn (1999–2003)
- NBA draft: 2003: undrafted
- Playing career: 2003–2011
- Position: Power forward

Career highlights
- 2× AP honorable mention All-America (2002, 2003); 2× Ivy League Player of the Year (2002, 2003); 2× First-team All-Ivy League (2002, 2003); Ivy League Rookie of the Year (2000)

Ugonna Nnamdi Onyekwe (born July 14, 1979) is a British-Nigerian former professional basketball player. He played professionally from September 2003 through April 2011 before retiring from the sport to enter the business world. Onyekwe played college basketball at the University of Pennsylvania where he became just the fourth Ivy League player ever to be named the Ivy League Player of the Year two times (2002, 2003).

== Early life ==
Onyekwe was born in Lagos, Nigeria. He spent his youth there until moving to London, England, where he spent the majority of his teenage years. Before his junior year of high school, Onyekwe moved to Mercersburg, Pennsylvania, United States. He starred on Mercersburg Academy's basketball team for his final two years of prep school. At the start of the 1999–2000 school year he enrolled at the University of Pennsylvania, located in Philadelphia; specifically, Onyekwe enrolled in their Wharton School of Business.

== College ==
Onyekwe played for the Penn Quakers between 1999 and 2003. In his freshman season he was named the Ivy League Rookie of the Year after averaging 11.7 points and 6.0 rebounds per game; he was also named to the All-Ivy League Second Team. Late in the season, in a very important match-up against Princeton, Onyekwe scored the game-sealing bucket with a 360-degree dunk. That play led off SportsCenter's highlights the night it happened. During the Quakers' first-round game of the NCAA Division I men's basketball tournament, he recorded 17 points and six rebounds against Illinois.

As a sophomore he repeated as a Second Team-er. Onyekwe averaged 13.8 points and 7.4 rebounds on the season, and in a game against eventual Final Four-bound Maryland, he scored 20 points. The following year, his junior season in 2001–02, he was named the Ivy League Player of the Year, was unanimous pick for All-Ivy League First Team, and was also selected for All-Philadelphia Big 5 First Team. He led Penn in scoring, field goal shooting, rebounding and blocks. The Quakers, as the #11-seed in the 2002 NCAA tournament, lost to #6 California, 82 to 75, in the opening round.

Onyekwe's senior season saw him repeat as the Ivy League Player of the Year, becoming just the second player in league history (with Princeton's Kit Mueller) to have earned that honor twice up until that point. He averaged 16.5 points, 6.4 rebounds, and 1.4 steals per game. He repeated as a First Team selection and even earned an honorable mention All-American status from the Associated Press. For most of the season he was projected to be a potential draft pick in the 2003 NBA draft, which would have made him the first Penn player drafted since Jerome Allen in 1995. Onyekwe graduated Penn with 1,762 points and 759 rebounds.

== Professional and later life ==
Despite being a potential draft pick, he was never selected. Onyekwe instead took his game overseas, where in his eight-year career he played in Israel and Spain. While in Israel he competed for Maccabi Rishon and Bnei Hasharon. While in Spain, he competed for Huelva, CAI Zaragoza and Baloncesto León.

Onyekwe retired from professional basketball in April 2011. He has since worked as an events coordinator, and co-founded a media company.
