= Ira Bowman =

American basketball player and coach (born 1973)

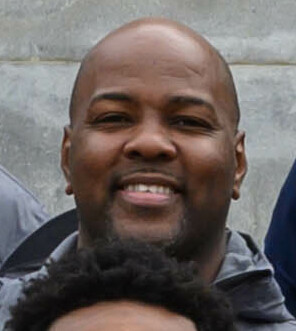
- Bowman in 2019

Auburn Tigers
- Title: Assistant coach
- League: Southeastern Conference

Personal information
- Born: June 11, 1973 (age 53) Newark, New Jersey, U.S.
- Listed height: 6 ft 5 in (1.96 m)
- Listed weight: 195 lb (88 kg)

Career information
- High school: Seton Hall Prep (West Orange, New Jersey)
- College: Providence (1991–1993); Penn (1994–1996)
- NBA draft: 1996: undrafted
- Playing career: 1996–2003
- Position: Guard
- Number: 11, 30, 7
- Coaching career: 2009–present

Career history

Playing
- 1996: Gold Coast Rollers
- 1996–2001: Connecticut Pride
- 1998–1999: New Jersey Shorecats
- 2000: Philadelphia 76ers
- 2001: Atlanta Hawks
- 2001: Philadelphia 76ers
- 2001: Pastificio di Nola Napoli
- 2002–2003: Grand Rapids Hoops

Coaching
- 2009–2012: NJIT (assistant)
- 2012–2018: Penn (assistant)
- 2018–present: Auburn (assistant)

Career highlights
- CBA champion (1999); 2× CBA All-Defensive Team (1999, 2000); Ivy League Player of the Year (1996)
- Stats at NBA.com
- Stats at Basketball Reference

Ira Bowman (born June 11, 1973) is an American retired professional basketball player formerly in the National Basketball Association (NBA). He is currently an assistant men's basketball coach for Auburn University.

He attended Providence College and the University of Pennsylvania but was not selected in an NBA draft. He played for the Philadelphia 76ers and the Atlanta Hawks from 1999 to 2001. He played for the Connecticut Pride of the Continental Basketball Association (CBA) from 1996 to 2001 and earned nominations to the CBA All-Defensive Team in 1999 and 2000. He played for the Grand Rapids Hoops of the CBA in 2002. He also played 13 games in the NBL for the Gold Coast Rollers in 1996.

Bowman played high school basketball at Seton Hall Preparatory School in West Orange, New Jersey, where he led the team to a 31–1 record as a senior and became the school's all-time career points leader. He was also the Ivy League Player of the Year (1995–1996) when he was playing for the University of Pennsylvania.

== Coaching career ==
Bowman, who was born in Newark, worked with Newark-based New Jersey Institute of Technology as an assistant basketball coach from 2008 to 2012 assisting head-coach Jim Engles in rebuilding the NCAA Division I record-setting (Division I transitional period) NJIT Highlanders men's basketball team. Bowman was hired by the University of Pennsylvania in June 2012 as an assistant coach at his alma mater. In 2018, Auburn basketball coach Bruce Pearl hired Bowman as an assistant coach.
