= Tim Begley =

American basketball player (b. 1983)

Personal information
- Born: August 8, 1983 (age 43) West Point, New York, U.S.
- Listed height: 6 ft 6 in (1.98 m)
- Listed weight: 230 lb (104 kg)

Career information
- High school: Christian Brothers Academy (Lincroft, New Jersey)
- College: Penn (2001–2005)
- NBA draft: 2005: undrafted
- Playing career: 2005–2008
- Position: Shooting guard
- Number: 31

Career history
- 2005–2008: Brose Bamberg

Career highlights
- AP honorable mention All-American (2005); Ivy League Player of the Year (2005); First-team All-Ivy League (2005); Second-team All-Ivy League (2004)

Timothy Michael Begley (born August 8, 1983) is an American former professional basketball player. He played in Germany for Brose Bamberg from 2005 to 2008 after a highly successful college career at the University of Pennsylvania where he was named the 2005 Ivy League Player of the Year.

== Early life ==
Born in West Point, New York, Begley grew up in Freehold Township, New Jersey and attended high school at Christian Brothers Academy (CBA). He started for the varsity team during his junior and senior years which saw CBA go 52–2, and win back-to-back Shore Conference and NJSIAA Parochial "A" school championships. In his senior year of 2000–01, Begley was named to the first team of All-Shore Conference, All-County, All-“A” North Jersey, Newark Star-Ledger, and Associated Press All-State.

== College ==
After high school, Begley enrolled at the University of Pennsylvania (Penn) in the Ivy League to play for the Quakers. He started all 32 games as a true freshman and averaged 6.8 points, 4.7 rebounds, and 3.0 assists per game. The next year, Begley earned an All-Ivy League Honorable Mention nod after averaging 6.9 points, 4.6 rebounds, and 2.9 assists while Penn repeated as Ivy League champions. In 2003–04, his junior season, he made the biggest one-year statistical scoring jump of his career by averaging 13.1 points, to go along with 4.3 rebounds and 4.2 assists. Even though the Quakers finished in second place (the only time during Begley's career they did not win the conference title), he was honored as an All-Ivy League Second Team player. During Begley's final year in 2004–05, he averaged career-bests in points (13.9), rebounds (5.4), and assists (4.8) while leading Penn to a 20–9 overall record (13–1 Ivy) and a third trip to the NCAA Division I men's basketball tournament in his four-year career. He was name a unanimous All-Ivy First Team member, and consequently the Ivy League Player of the Year, which was Penn's 13th total conference player of the year honor in the league's history. The Associated Press also named him as an honorable mention All-American.

== Professional career and later life ==
Begley did not get selected in the ensuing 2005 NBA draft. Instead, he signed to play for Brose Bamberg in Germany's top professional league, the Basketball Bundesliga (BBL). He played from 2005 to 2008 and helped them to moderate success during this stretch, including a German Cup finals appearance in 2005–06 and a first-place finish atop the BBL in 2006–07. His final appearance for the club came in September 2008, where he played in one game in 2008–09 before retiring.

In his post-basketball life, Begley has participated extensively in World Series of Poker tournaments, with career earnings of over USD$345,000 as of 2023.
