= Dave Duke =

American basketball coach

Biographical details
- Born: April 23, 1951 (age 75)
- Education: Villanova

Coaching career (HC unless noted)
- 1980–1985: St. John Neumann HS
- 1985–1988: Lehigh (assistant)
- 1988–1996: Lehigh
- 1996–1998: Atlantic City Seagulls (assistant)
- 1998–2006: Penn (assistant)
- 2006–2019: Temple (assistant)

Head coaching record
- Overall: 90–134 (college)

Accomplishments and honors

Championships
- ECC regular season (1990)

Awards
- ECC Coach of the Year (1990)

Dave Duke (born April 23, 1951) is an American basketball coach who was most recently an assistant coach at Temple University.

Duke attended Clifton Heights High School, averaging 15.2 points per game as a senior and earning All-Delaware County honors. While a senior at Villanova University, Duke began his coaching career as a high school junior varsity coach. Between 1980 and 1985, he coached at St. John Neumann High School, helping the team win the Catholic League title in 1985. Duke joined Fran McCaffery's staff at Lehigh in 1985.

Duke served as the head coach at Lehigh University after McCaffery left to become an assistant at Notre Dame in 1988. He was hampered by the fact that Lehigh did not offer scholarships at the time. In 1990, Duke was named ECC Coach of the Year after guiding the team to a 18–12 record. The following season, the Mountain Hawks finished 19-10 and lost to Holy Cross in the Patriot League Tournament. He coached the 1993 McDonald's East-West High School All-Star game. Duke stepped down in 1996, after a 4–23 season. He finished with a 90–134 record.

He became the coach of the Atlantic City Seagulls and helped the team win USBL Championship in 1997. In 1998, Duke joined Fran Dunphy's staff at Penn. When Dunphy was hired at Temple in 2006, Duke followed him as an assistant. In 2014, he became Temple's director of player development.
