= Ibrahim Jaaber =

Former Professional Basketball Player, American Poet, Islamic Faith Leader

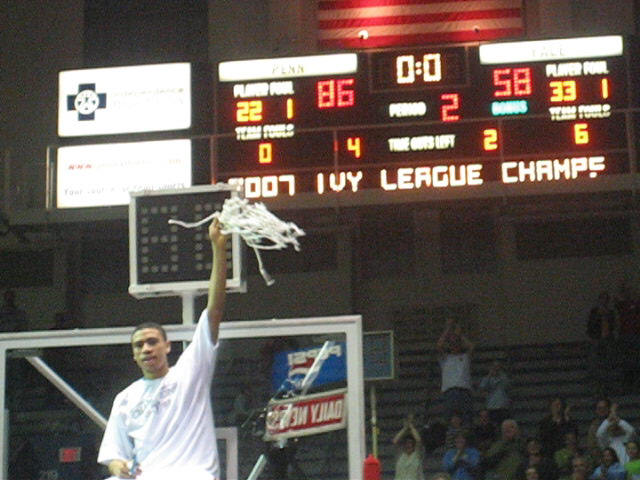
- Ibrahim Jaaber sits on top of the rim after Penn defeated Yale 86–58 on March 2, 2007, holding the net

Personal information
- Born: February 3, 1984 (age 42) Elizabeth, New Jersey, U.S.
- Listed height: 6 ft 2 in (1.88 m)
- Listed weight: 175 lb (79 kg)

Career information
- High school: Elizabeth (Elizabeth, New Jersey)
- College: Penn (2003–2007)
- NBA draft: 2007: undrafted
- Playing career: 2007–2013
- Position: Point guard / shooting guard

Career history
- 2007–2008: Aigaleo
- 2008–2010: Lottomatica Roma
- 2010–2011: AJ Milano
- 2012–2013: Žalgiris Kaunas
- 2013: Petrochimi Bandar Imam

Career highlights
- 2× Ivy League Player of the Year (2006, 2007)

Ibrahim Jaaber (born February 3, 1984) is an American-born naturalized Bulgarian former professional basketball player. At 1.88 m (6'2") in height, he played at both the point guard and shooting guard positions. He also played for the senior Bulgarian national basketball team, despite being born in the United States.

== College career ==
As a former men's college basketball player at the University of Pennsylvania, he won the Ivy League Player of the Year in his junior and senior years, in the process breaking the league's career record for steals (303) and finishing among the top pickpockets in college basketball (2nd nationally in steals his junior year and 3rd nationally in steals his senior year). With Mark Zoller, Ibby also led the Quakers to three straight Ivy League titles between his sophomore and senior years; he also played well in the team's three NCAA Tournament games getting 16 points against Texas A&M and 15 against Texas and he scored 21 points when Penn visited a top North Carolina team. Jaaber will go down as one of the best players ever to play for the Quakers and is the all-time leader in steals at Penn and in the Ivy League.

On Friday September 25th, 2026, Ibrahim Jaaber was inducted into University of Pennsylvania Athletics Hall of Fame.

On Jaaber's Plaque: A two-time Ivy League Player of the Year and two-time honorable mention All-American, he helped lead Penn to three Ivy League titles and NCAA appearances in 2005, 2006 and 2007. He earned three All-Ivy League selections, including two years as a unanimous First-Team pick. He graduated as the Penn and Ivy League record holder in steals in a career (303) and season (96). The 2006 Philadelphia Big 5 Player of the Year, he was also a two-time First-Team All-Big 5 selection and inducted into the Big 5 Hall of Fame in 2017. He graduated sixth in program history with 1,518 points and seventh with 321 career assists. He set the program record for assists in a season with 162 in 2007.

=== Career college stats ===
- 2003–2004 (Penn): Pts: 6.5 Rbs: 2.4 Stls: 1.3 Ast: .6
- 2004–2005 (Penn): Pts: 11.5 Rbs: 4.6 Stls: 2.9 Ast: 2.8
- 2005–2006 (Penn): Pts: 18.2 Rbs: 3.4 Stls: 3.3 Ast: 2.2 (Ivy League Player of the Year)
- 2006–2007 (Penn): Pts: 15.9 Rbs: 4.5 Stls: 2.9 Ast: 5.2 (Ivy League Player of the Year, Big 5 Player of the Year, AP All-American Notable)
- Career: Pts: 13.3 Rbs: 3.8 Stls: 2.7 Ast: 2.8

== Professional career ==
Ibrahim Jaaber was not drafted by any NBA teams, but he played for the Detroit Pistons' Summer League squad from July 7–14, 2007 and he subsequently signed a contract to play professionally for a Greek League team called Aigaleo. He then moved to the premiere EuroLeague to play with Lottomatica Roma. In the 2010 NBA Summer League, he played for the Los Angeles Lakers. In August 2010 he signed with AJ Milano.

On January 30, 2013, Jaaber announced that he is leaving his former team Žalgiris Kaunas for personal reasons. He also stated that he will not play for any other European team. Jaaber explained in a letter to the club he left Lithuania because he could not stand to see the dances too suggestive of Zalgiris cheerleaders and he disagreed with advertisements appearing on T-shirts team. "I am well aware that this might prevent me from earning money through basketball for the rest of my life, but I am willing to make this sacrifice because of my beliefs (Islam)," he wrote.

Following his retirement in 2012, Jaaber has devoted himself to writing books, mentoring, coaching, spoken word poetry, and working with underprivileged youth in inner-city communities.

== Connections with Muslim Community ==
Ibrahim Jaaber is now a youth director at IECPA (Jesus Son of Mary Mosque).

== National team career ==
Jaaber played internationally with the senior men's Bulgarian national basketball team.

== Career statistics ==
Legend
GP	Games played	GS	Games started	MPG	Minutes per game
FG%	Field-goal percentage	3P%	3-point field-goal percentage	FT%	Free-throw percentage
RPG	Rebounds per game	APG	Assists per game	SPG	Steals per game
BPG	Blocks per game	PPG	Points per game	PIR	Performance index rating
**Bold**	Career high

=== EuroLeague ===
Year	Team	GP	GS	MPG	FG%	3P%	FT%	RPG	APG	SPG	BPG	PPG	PIR
2007–08	Lottomatica Roma	6	1	22.4	.405	.273	.286	3.3	1.5	2.5	.3	7.5	6.5
2008–09	Lottomatica Roma	16	15	26.3	.576	.280	.594	3.3	1.9	1.9	.3	10.4	10.4
2009–10	Lottomatica Roma	10	10	31.0	.463	.225	.625	4.4	2.5	2.2	.1	10.4	8.8
2010–11	AJ Milano	10	1	24.4	.588	.353	.750	1.7	2.4	.7	.3	10.8	9.6
2012–13	Zalgiris	14	10	21.1	.515	.333	.619	2.2	2.2	1.9	.1	5.9	7.4
