= Matt Maloney =

American basketball player (born 1971)

Personal information
- Born: December 6, 1971 (age 54) Silver Spring, Maryland, U.S.
- Listed height: 6 ft 3 in (1.91 m)
- Listed weight: 192 lb (87 kg)

Career information
- High school: Haddonfield Memorial (Haddonfield, New Jersey)
- College: Vanderbilt (1990–1991); Penn (1992–1995)
- NBA draft: 1995: undrafted
- Playing career: 1995–2003
- Position: Point guard
- Number: 12, 11

Career history
- 1995–1996: Grand Rapids Mackers
- 1996–1999: Houston Rockets
- 2000: Chicago Bulls
- 2000–2003: Atlanta Hawks

Career highlights
- NBA All-Rookie Second Team (1997); CBA All-Rookie Second Team (1996); Ivy League Player of the Year (1995); 3× First-team All-Ivy League (1993–1995)

Career NBA statistics
- Points: 2,177 (7.4 ppg)
- Rebounds: 500 (1.7 rpg)
- Assists: 852 (2.9 apg)
- Stats at NBA.com
- Stats at Basketball Reference

Matthew Patrick Maloney (born December 6, 1971) is an American former professional basketball player who played seven seasons in the National Basketball Association (NBA).

== Early years ==
Maloney was born in Silver Spring, Maryland, but grew up in Haddonfield, New Jersey.

== College career ==
Maloney began his basketball career at Vanderbilt University, transferring after his freshman year to the University of Pennsylvania, and played three seasons as a Penn Quaker.

During Maloney's three seasons as a Penn Quaker, the team went 42–0 in the Ivy League with him as a starting guard, including three Ivy League championships and subsequently three bids to the NCAA tournament. The Penn Quakers went 69–14 during Maloney's career. He was also a three-time first-team All-Ivy selection, and was the Ivy League's Player of the Year his senior season.

Maloney holds several Quaker records, including a 37-point game (sophomore year vs. American; tied for fourth-best single game scoring performance in program history), 91 three-pointers made in single season (second all-time, 1992–93), 44.4% three-pointer field goal percentage (fifth all-time, 1992–93), 89.7% free throw percentage (61 of 68, first all-time, 1993–94), and 62 steals in a single season (fourth all time, 1993–94).

In the Philadelphia Big 5, Maloney was a two-time first-team All-Big 5 selection (1992–93 and 1994–95). Maloney was second-team All-Big 5 selection in 1993–94.

== Professional career ==
Never drafted by a National Basketball Association team, Maloney made his debut for the Grand Rapids Mackers of the Continental Basketball Association (CBA) during the 1995–96 season and was named to the CBA All-Rookie Second Team.

Maloney played with the Houston Rockets from 1996 to 1999, the Chicago Bulls during 1999–2000 and the Atlanta Hawks for the 2000–01 and 2002–03 seasons.

He is notable for his rookie season when the two players in front of him on the depth chart had season ending injuries and Maloney was able to start all 82 regular season games at point guard for a Rockets squad with future Hall of Famers Charles Barkley, Clyde Drexler, and Hakeem Olajuwon. The club won 57 games, eventually losing to the Utah Jazz in six games in the Western Conference Finals during the 1997 playoffs.

Maloney's father, Jim, a longtime assistant coach for John Chaney at Temple University, died only months before Maloney began playing for his first NBA team. During his career he appeared in 21 playoff games and scored a total of 177 points, achieving a career-high 26 points twice during the 1997 playoffs.

== NBA career statistics ==
Legend
GP	Games played	GS	Games started	MPG	Minutes per game
FG%	Field goal percentage	3P%	3-point field goal percentage	FT%	Free throw percentage
RPG	Rebounds per game	APG	Assists per game	SPG	Steals per game
BPG	Blocks per game	PPG	Points per game	**Bold**	Career high
*	Led the league

=== Regular season ===
Year	Team	GP	GS	MPG	FG%	3P%	FT%	RPG	APG	SPG	BPG	PPG
1996–97	Houston	**82**	**82***	**29.1**	**.441**	**.404**	.763	2.0	**3.7**	**1.0**	.0	**9.4**
1997–98	Houston	78	78	28.4	.408	.364	.833	1.8	2.8	.8	**.1**	8.6
1998–99	Houston	15	7	12.4	.179	.067	**.909**	.7	1.4	.3	.0	1.4
1999–00	Chicago	51	12	23.0	.358	.356	.822	1.3	2.7	.6	**.1**	6.4
2000–01	Atlanta	55	27	25.5	.420	.359	.765	**2.1**	2.8	**1.0**	**.1**	6.7
2002–03	Atlanta	14	0	7.4	.320	.333	.600	.5	1.2	.3	.0	1.7
Career		295	206	25.3	.408	.372	.797	1.7	2.9	.8	.0	7.4

=== Playoffs ===
Year	Team	GP	GS	MPG	FG%	3P%	FT%	RPG	APG	SPG	BPG	PPG
1997	Houston	**16**	**16**	32.9	**.399**	**.398**	.667	1.2	3.1	**.6**	.2	**11.2**
1998	Houston	5	5	**33.0**	.333	.250	**.889**	**1.6**	**3.6**	.4	**.4**	6.6
Career		21	21	32.9	.388	.375	.733	1.3	3.2	.6	.2	10.1
