= 2011–12 Ivy League men's basketball season =

- League: NCAA Division I
- Sport: Basketball
- Duration: January 7 – March 6, 2012
- Teams: 8

Regular season
- League Champions: Harvard
- Season MVP: Zack Rosen, Penn

Basketball seasons
- ← 2010–11 2012–13 →

2011–12 Ivy League men's basketball standings
	Conf.				Overall
Team	W		L	PCT	W		L	PCT
Harvard	12	–	2	.857	26	–	5	.839
Penn	11	–	3	.786	20	–	13	.606
Princeton	10	–	4	.714	20	–	12	.625
Yale	9	–	5	.643	19	–	10	.655
Cornell	7	–	7	.500	12	–	16	.429
Columbia	4	–	10	.286	15	–	15	.500
Brown	2	–	12	.143	8	–	23	.258
Dartmouth	1	–	13	.071	5	–	25	.167
As of March 15, 2012; Rankings from AP Poll

The 2011–12 Ivy League men's basketball season marked the continuation of the annual tradition of competitive basketball among Ivy League members that began when the league was formed during the 1956–57 season, continuing from the predecessor Eastern Intercollegiate Basketball League, which was formed in 1902. Harvard was the preseason favorite for the first time and spent most of the season receiving vote in the 2011–12 national rankings. The season marked the first time that four Ivy League teams (Harvard, Penn, Princeton and Yale) participated in the postseason. The season marked the second time that the Ivy League had three 20-win teams (Harvard, Penn and Princeton).

Zack Rosen earned Ivy League Men's Basketball Player of the Year and earned Associated Press All-American honorable mention recognition. Reggie Willhite was Ivy League Defensive Player of the Year and Shonn Miller was the Conference Rookie of the Year. In addition to Rosen, Ian Hummer was a unanimous first team All-Ivy League selection. The conference had two Academic All-America honorees (Matthew Sullivan and Chris Wroblewski) and a Lowe's Senior CLASS Award finalist (Rosen).

== Preseason ==
Entering the 2011–12 NCAA Division I men's basketball season head coach Mitch Henderson began his tenure at Princeton. Greg Mangano was one of 22 USA Basketball invitees to the USA Basketball Men's World University Games Team training camp to select the team for the 2011 Summer Universiade held at Shenzhen, Guangdong, China. He competed in basketball at the 2011 Summer Universiade, becoming the first Men's Ivy League Basketball World University Games participant since Bill Bradley. Jeremiah Kreisberg was named to the Israeli team for the FIBA Europe Under-20 Championship Division B held in Bosnia and Herzegovina. He played in 6 of the team's 8 games, leading the team in scoring and finishing second in rebounds. Preseason publications predicted Harvard would finish in first place. For the first time in school history, the Ivy League media panel selected Harvard as its first place choice. Princeton and Yale finished tied for second.

== Season ==
By returning all of their key players from the 2010–11 Ivy League co-champion 2010–11 Crimson and competing successfully, Harvard received votes in the 2011–12 NCAA Division I men's basketball rankings polls every week until the final week of the season and was ranked for many weeks. Harvard represented the Ivy League by sweeping its three contests and emerging victorious in the 2011 Battle 4 Atlantis. Among the highlights of the season were victories by both Harvard and Princeton over eventual 2012 ACC men's basketball tournament champion Florida State. Zack Rosen finished the season as the Ivy League Men's Basketball Player of the Year.

Following the annual 14-game round robin home & home schedule, Harvard emerged as champion and earned the conference's automatic bid to the 2012 NCAA Men's Division I Basketball Tournament. Harvard entered the tournament as a number 12 seed, making its first NCAA tournament appearance since 1946. Princeton and Penn were invited to the 2012 College Basketball Invitational. Yale was invited to the 2012 CollegeInsider.com Tournament. The season marked the first time that four Ivy League teams (Harvard, Penn, Princeton and Yale) participated in the postseason. The season marked the second time that the Ivy League had three 20-win teams (Harvard, Penn and Princeton).

== Honors and accolades ==
Five players (Eitan Chemerinski - Jr., Cornell; Austin Morgan - Jr., Yale; Matthew Sullivan - Jr., Brown; Reggie Willhite - Sr., Yale; Chris Wroblewski - Sr. Cornell) were named Academic All-District, meaning that they were among the 40 finalists to be named to the 15-man Academic All-America Team. Sullivan and Wroblewski were both named third team Academic All-Americans. It was Wrobleski's second consecutive Academic All-American recognition.

Keith Wright was a preseason candidate for the John R. Wooden Award and the Lou Henson Award. Penn's Zack Rosen, Columbia's Brian Barbour, Cornell's Wroblewski and Harvard's Brandyn Curry were among 65 preseason Cousy Award preseason watchlist candidates. Rosen made the list of 20 finalists. Rosen and Wrobleski were among 30 preseason Lowe's Senior CLASS Award candidates. Rosen was among the ten finalists.

=== In season ===
Each week the Ivy League selects a player of the week and a rookie of the week.

	Player of the Week					Rookie of the Week		
	Name	School	Class	Position		Name	School	Position
November 14, 2011	Zack Rosen	Penn	Sr.	G		Shonn Miller	Cornell	F
	Greg Mangano	Yale	Sr.	C		Jvonte Brooks	Dartmouth	F
November 21, 2011	Zack Rosen	Penn	Sr.	G		Shonn Miller	Cornell	F
						Gabas Maldunas	Dartmouth	F
November 28, 2011	Keith Wright	Harvard	Sr.	F		Alex Rosenberg	Columbia	F
						Shonn Miller	Cornell	F
December 5, 2011	Meiko Lyles	Columbia	So.	F		Jonah Travis	Harvard	F
December 12, 2011	Kyle Casey	Harvard	Jr.	F		Gabas Maldunas	Dartmouth	F
	Tyler Bernardini	Penn	Sr.	G				
December 19, 2011	Ian Hummer	Princeton	Jr.	F		Galal Cancer	Cornell	F
						John Golden	Dartmouth	G
December 26, 2011	Tyler Bernardini	Penn	Sr.	G		Jvonte Brooks	Dartmouth	F
Greg Mangano	Yale	Sr.	C		Denton Koon	Princeton	F	
January 9, 2012	Greg Mangano	Yale	Sr.	C		Gabas Maldunas	Dartmouth	F
Keith Wright	Harvard	Sr.	F		Shonn Miller	Cornell	F	
January 23, 2012	Mark Cisco	Columbia	Jr.	C		Corbin Miller	Harvard	G
January 30, 2012	Andrew McCarthy	Brown	Jr.	F		Steve Moundou-Missi	Harvard	F
February 6, 2012	Greg Mangano	Yale	Sr.	C		Shonn Miller	Cornell	F
February 13, 2012	Chris Wroblewski	Cornell	Sr.	G		Jvonte Brooks	Dartmouth	F
February 20, 2012	Zack Rosen	Penn	Sr.	G		Gabas Maldunas	Dartmouth	F
February 27, 2012	Zack Rosen	Penn	Sr.	G		John Golden	Dartmouth	G
March 5, 2012	Kyle Casey	Harvard	Jr.	F		Jvonte Brooks	Dartmouth	F
	Zack Rosen	Penn	Sr.	G				

=== All-Ivy ===
The following players earned Ivy League postseason recognition:

Player of the Year

- ^Zack Rosen, Penn (Sr., G, Colonia, N.J.)

Rookie of the Year

- Shonn Miller, Cornell (Fr., F, Euclid, Ohio)

Defensive Player of the Year

- Reggie Willhite, Yale (Sr., G/F, Elk Grove, Calif.)

First Team All-Ivy

- Brian Barbour, Columbia (Jr., G, Alamo, Calif.)
- Chris Wroblewski, Cornell (Sr., G, Highland Park, Ill.)
- Kyle Casey, Harvard (Jr., F, Medway, Mass.)
- ^Zack Rosen, Penn (Sr., G, Colonia, N.J.)
- ^Ian Hummer, Princeton (Jr., F, Vienna, Va.)
- Greg Mangano, Yale (Sr., C, Orange, Conn.)

Second Team All-Ivy

- Sean McGonagill, Brown (So., G, Brookfield, Ill.)
- Brandyn Curry, Harvard (Jr., G, Huntersville, N.C.)
- Keith Wright, Harvard (Sr., F, Suffolk, Va.)
- Douglas Davis, Princeton (Sr., G, Philadelphia)
- Reggie Willhite, Yale (Sr., G/F, Elk Grove, Calif.)

Honorable Mention All-Ivy

- Johnathan Gray, Cornell (Jr., G, Tampa, Fla.)
- Rob Belcore, Penn (Sr., G, Lake Forest, Ill.)
- ^Unanimous Selection

=== USBWA ===
On March 6, the U.S. Basketball Writers Association released its 2011–12 Men's All-District Teams, based upon voting from its national membership. There were nine regions from coast to coast, and a player and coach of the year were selected in each. The following lists all the Big Ten representatives selected within their respective regions.

District I (New England)

Coach of the Year

- Tommy Amaker, Harvard

All-District Team

- Kyle Casey, Harvard
- Greg Mangano, Yale
- Keith Wright, Harvard
District II (New York, New Jersey, Delaware, District of Columbia, Pennsylvania, West Virginia)

All-District Team

- Zack Rosen, Penn

=== NABC ===
The National Association of Basketball Coaches announced their Division I All-District teams on March 14, recognizing the nation's best men's collegiate basketball student-athletes. Selected and voted on by member coaches of the NABC, 240 student-athletes, from 24 districts were chosen. The selection on this list were then eligible for the State Farm Coaches' Division I All-America teams. The following list represented the District 13 players chosen to the list.

First Team

- Zack Rosen Pennsylvania
- Greg Mangano Yale
- Keith Wright Harvard
Second Team
- Ian Hummer Princeton
- Kyle Casey Harvard
- Brian Barbour Columbia

=== Other ===
Rosen was named an honorable mention Associated Press All-American. Wright was also selected to participate in the NABC 2012 Reese's Division I All-Star Game at the 2012 NCAA Men's Division I Basketball Tournament final four.

== Rankings ==
On December 5, 2011, Harvard made its first ever appearance in either the AP (25) or Coaches Poll (24). It leaves Brown as the only remaining Ivy League school to have never been ranked in the AP Poll and leaves only seven schools that have played Division I basketball since the AP Poll began that have never been ranked in it. Harvard is the first Ivy League team ranked in the Coaches Poll since the 2009–10 Cornell Big Red and the first Ivy League team ranked in the AP Poll since the 1997–98 Princeton Tigers, who finished 8th in the poll. By January 2, the team achieved rankings of 22 in the AP Poll and 21 in the Coaches Poll. The team was also ranked 21st in the Coaches Poll On February 6. Below are Harvard's rankings for the season:

Ranking movements Legend: ██ Increase in ranking ██ Decrease in ranking RV = Received votes
	Week																			
Poll	Pre	1	2	3	4	5	6	7	8	9	10	11	12	13	14	15	16	17	18	Final
AP Poll	RV	RV	RV	RV	25	RV	RV	24	22	RV	RV	RV	RV	25	RV	RV	RV	RV	RV	
Coaches Poll			RV	RV	24	RV	25	23	21	25	24	23	23	21	RV	RV	RV	RV	RV	

== Postseason ==
=== NCAA tournament ===
Team	Bid Type	Seed	Results
Harvard	Automatic	#12	lost to #5 Vanderbilt 79–70

=== National Invitation tournament ===
The Ivy League did not have any entrants in this tournament.

=== College Basketball Invitational ===
Team	Results
Penn	defeated Quinnipiac 74–63 lost to Butler 63–53
Princeton	defeated Evansville 95–86 lost to Pittsburgh 82–61

=== CollegeInsider.com tournament ===
Team	Results
Yale	lost to Fairfield 68–56
