= Penn–Princeton men's basketball rivalry =

American college basketball rivalry

Penn–Princeton basketball rivalry
- Penn Quakers Princeton Tigers
- First meeting: 1903
- Latest meeting: February 7, 2026
- Stadiums: Jadwin Gymnasium, The Palestra

Statistics
- Total meetings: 254
- All-time series: Princeton, 127–127
- Current win streak: Penn, 1 (2026)

Locations of Penn and Princeton

The Penn–Princeton men's basketball rivalry is an American college basketball rivalry between the Penn Quakers men's basketball team of the University of Pennsylvania and Princeton Tigers men's basketball team of Princeton University. Having been contested every year since 1903, it is the third oldest consecutively played rivalry in National Collegiate Athletic Association Division I history. Unlike many notable college basketball rivalries, such as Duke–North Carolina, which involves teams that often both get invited to the same NCAA tournaments, Notre Dame–UCLA, which involves geographically remote teams, Illinois–Missouri, which involves non-conference rivals, or Alabama–Auburn, which takes a back seat to the football rivalry, this is a rivalry of geographically close, conference rivals, who compete for a single NCAA invitation and consider the basketball rivalry more important than other sports rivalries between the schools. A head-to-head contest has been the final regularly scheduled game of the Princeton season every year since 1995. Between 1963 and 2007, Princeton or Penn won or shared the Ivy League conference championship every season except 1986 and 1988. The other seasons in which neither team won or shared the Ivy League title are 1957, 1958, 1962, 2008–10, and 2012–2016.

The two programs are omnipresent in the history of Ivy League basketball. Entering the 2013–14 NCAA Division I men's basketball season, 11 of the 12 active Division I basketball head coaches who are Ivy basketball alumni are from these two programs: Penn – Jerome Allen (Penn), Matt Langel (Colgate), Fran McCaffery (Iowa) and Andrew Toole (Robert Morris); Princeton – Mitch Henderson (Princeton), Sydney Johnson (Fairfield), Chris Mooney (Richmond), Craig Robinson (Oregon State), Joe Scott (Denver), John Thompson III (Georgetown) and Mike Brennan (American).

Penn and Princeton have each won 26 conference championships. Princeton has been undefeated in conference 5 times: 1968–69, 1975–76, 1990–91, 1996–97 & 1997–98. Penn has been undefeated in conference 7 times: 1969–70, 1970–71, 1992–93, 1993–94, 1994–95, 1999–2000 & 2002–03. Four one-loss Penn teams suffered their only conference loss to Princeton: 1971–72, 1974–75, 1980–81 & 1998–99. The following one-loss Princeton teams suffered their only conference loss to Penn 1976–77, 1980–81 and 2003–04. Note that in the 1980–81 season both teams had one loss, and Princeton won a one-game playoff for the NCAA invitation. Also, in 1996 when both teams had two losses, the 1995–96 Tigers suffered their only conference losses to the 1995–96 Quakers, and Princeton won a one-game playoff for the automatic NCAA invitation.

Both Penn and Princeton have earned 24 bids each as Ivy League conference's bid to the NCAA Division I men's basketball tournament. Both teams have advanced to the NCAA tournament final four once: 1964–65 Tigers and 1978–79 Quakers. Additionally, the 1974–75 Tigers won the 1975 National Invitation Tournament championship.

== "Black Tuesday" - February 9, 1999 ==
Princeton 50, Penn 49

After Princeton's Brian Earl opened the scoring with a three-pointer, Penn scored 29 unanswered points to stake a 29-3 lead. The Quakers led 33-9 at the break and 40-13 in the second half. But Princeton closed the game on a 37-9 run to score a stunning 50-49 victory and move into first place in the Ivy League. As of 2010, the 27-point comeback from 13–40 with 15:11 remaining to win 50–49 over Penn on February 9, 1999, remains the fifth-largest comeback and fourth-largest second-half comeback in NCAA history. That game's 9–33 half time deficit comeback remains the second-largest comeback.

== Recent games ==
The 2010–11 Tigers needed to beat the 2010–11 Quakers in the season-ending rivalry game to tie the 2010–11 Harvard Crimson for the regular season co-championship and necessitate a one-game playoff for the conference's automatic NCAA tournament invitation. Princeton won.

The 2011–12 Quakers needed a victory over the 2011–12 Tigers in the season-ending rivalry game to tie the 2011–12 Crimson for the regular season co-championship and necessitate a one-game playoff for the conference's automatic NCAA tournament invitation. Penn lost.

The first game of the 2017 Ivy League men's basketball tournament, which was the inaugural Ivy League men's basketball tournament was an overtime victory by Princeton over Penn.

== Series facts ==
Statistic	Penn	Princeton
Head-to-head
Games played	253	
Wins	126	127
Home wins	70	64
Road wins	52	49
Neutral site wins	4	3
Playoff wins	1	2
Consecutive wins	?	14
Total points scored in the series	?	?
Most points scored in a game by one team in a win	?	?
Most points scored in a game by both teams	?	
Most points scored in a game by one team in a loss	?	?
Fewest points scored in a game by both teams	?	
Fewest points scored in a game by one team in a win	?	?
Largest margin of victory	?	?
Smallest margin of victory	?	?
Championships and Tournaments
NCAA tournament Bids	24	24
NCAA Tournament Regional Championships	1	1
National Invitation Tournament Bids	1	7
Postseason appearances	26	32
Ivy League Championships	26	26
Outright Ivy League Championships	21	18
Undefeated Ivy League Championships	7	5
Gave foe only Ivy League loss(es)	4	4
EIBL Championships	13	6
Other
All-Time Weeks in the AP Poll	78	41

== See also ==
- Penn–Princeton football rivalry
