= 2011–12 Yale Bulldogs men's basketball team =

American college basketball season

2011–12 Yale Bulldogs men's basketball

CIT, First Round
- Conference: Ivy League
- Record: 19–10 (9–5 Ivy)
- Head coach: James Jones (13th season)
- Assistant coaches: Matt Kingsley; Jamie Snyder-Fair; Justin Simon
- Home arena: John J. Lee Amphitheater

2011–12 Ivy League men's basketball standings
	Conf.				Overall
Team	W		L	PCT	W		L	PCT
Harvard	12	–	2	.857	26	–	5	.839
Penn	11	–	3	.786	20	–	13	.606
Princeton	10	–	4	.714	20	–	12	.625
Yale	9	–	5	.643	19	–	10	.655
Cornell	7	–	7	.500	12	–	16	.429
Columbia	4	–	10	.286	15	–	15	.500
Brown	2	–	12	.143	8	–	23	.258
Dartmouth	1	–	13	.071	5	–	25	.167
As of March 15, 2012; Rankings from AP Poll

The 2011–12 Yale Bulldogs men's basketball team represented Yale University during the 2011–12 NCAA Division I men's basketball season. The Bulldogs, led by 13th year head coach James Jones, played their home games at John J. Lee Amphitheater of the Payne Whitney Gymnasium and are members of the Ivy League. They finished the season 19–10, 9–5 in Ivy League play to finish in fourth place. They were invited to the 2012 CollegeInsider.com Tournament where they lost in the first round to Fairfield.

== Roster ==
Number	Name	Position	Height	Weight	Year	Hometown
1	Austin Morgan	Guard	5–11	185	Junior	Reno, Nevada
3	Will Bartlett	Forward	6–6	200	Sophomore	New York City, New York
5	Michael Grace	Guard	6–0	180	Junior	Winston-Salem, North Carolina
10	Brian Katz	Guard	6–4	200	Senior	Woodbury, New York
11	Jesse Pritchard	Guard	6–5	215	Sophomore	Ames, Iowa
12	Armani Cotton	Guard	6–7	215	Freshman	New York City, New York
15	Rhett Anderson	Forward	6–8	230	Senior	La Canada, California
20	Javier Duren	Guard	6–4	175	Freshman	St. Louis, Missouri
22	Reggie Willhite	Guard/Forward	6–4	194	Senior	Elk Grove, California
23	Isaiah Salafia	Guard	6–3	185	Sophomore	Cromwell, Connecticut
25	Sam Martin	Guard	6–3	195	Junior	West Warwick, Rhode Island
32	Greg Kelley	Forward	6–8	215	Sophomore	Newton, Massachusetts
34	Will Childs-Klein	Center	6–11	225	Freshman	St. Louis, Missouri
35	Brandon Sherrod	Forward	6–6	230	Freshman	Bridgeport, Connecticut
42	Matt Townsend	Forward	6–7	235	Freshman	Chappaqua, New York
44	Greg Mangano	Center	6–10	240	Senior	Orange, Connecticut
50	Jeremiah Kreisberg	Center/Forward	6–10	230	Sophomore	Berkeley, California

== Schedule ==
Date time, TV	Rank^{#}	Opponent^{#}	Result	Record	Site (attendance) city, state
Regular Season
November 11, 2011*; 8:00 pm		vs. Central Connecticut; Connecticut 6 Classic	W 73–69	1–0	Mohegan Sun Arena; Uncasville, CT
November 15, 2011*; 7:00 pm, SNY		at Quinnipiac	L 62–68	1–1	TD Bank Sports Center (2,744); Hamden, CT
November 17, 2011*; 7:00 pm		Lyndon State	W 101–37	2–1	John J. Lee Amphitheater (1,715); New Haven, CT
November 22, 2011*; 7:00 pm		at Seton Hall	L 62–73	2–2	Prudential Center (6,287); Newark, NJ
November 26, 2011*; 7:00 pm		at Army	W 84–75	3–2	Christl Arena (695); West Point, NY
November 29, 2011*; 7:00 pm		at Hartford	W 74–69	4–2	Chase Arena at Reich Family Pavilion (966); West Hartford, CT
December 3, 2011*; 2:00 pm		Vermont	W 68–52	5–2	John J. Lee Amphitheater (1,205); New Haven, CT
December 5, 2011*; 7:00 pm		at Sacred Heart	W 73–71	6–2	William H. Pitt Center (641); Fairfield, CT
December 7, 2011*; 7:30 pm		Bryant	W 76–59	7–2	John J. Lee Amphitheater (877); New Haven, CT
December 18, 2011*; 2:00 pm, Cox		at Rhode Island	W 68–65	8–2	Ryan Center (3,355); Kingston, RI
December 29, 2011*; 7:00 pm		at Wake Forest	L 71–72	8–3	LJVM Coliseum (8,183); Winston-Salem, NC
December 31, 2011*; 2:00 pm, ESPNU		at No. 10 Florida	L 70–90	8–4	O'Connell Center (9,119); Gainesville, FL
January 3, 2012*; 7:00 pm		Holy Cross	W 82–67	9–4	John J. Lee Amphitheater (1,326); New Haven, CT
January 8, 2012*; 4:00 pm		St. Joseph's–Long Island	W 101–86	10–4	John J. Lee Amphitheater (814); New Haven, CT
January 14, 2012; 2:00 pm		Brown	W 68–64	11–4 (1–0)	John J. Lee Amphitheater (1,832); New Haven, CT
January 21, 2012; 2:00 pm		at Brown	W 73–60	12–4 (2–0)	Pizzitola Sports Center (870); Providence, RI
January 27, 2012; 7:00 pm		Harvard	L 35–65	12–5 (2–1)	John J. Lee Amphitheater (2,522); New Haven, CT
January 28, 2012; 7:00 pm		Dartmouth	W 62–52	13–5 (3–1)	John J. Lee Amphitheater (1,809); New Haven, CT
February 3, 2012; 7:00 pm		Penn	W 60–53	14–5 (4–1)	John J. Lee Amphitheater (2,012); New Haven, CT
February 4, 2012; 7:00 pm		Princeton	W 58–54	15–5 (5–1)	John J. Lee Amphitheater (2,175); New Haven, CT
February 10, 2012; 7:00 pm		at Cornell	L 84–85 ^{OT}	15–6 (5–2)	Newman Arena (1,876); Ithaca, NY
February 11, 2012; 7:00 pm		at Columbia	W 59–58	16–6 (6–2)	Levien Gymnasium (2,442); New York, NY
February 17, 2012; 7:00 pm		at Dartmouth	W 70–61	17–6 (7–2)	Leede Arena (800); Hanover, NH
February 18, 2012; 7:00 pm		at Harvard	L 51–66	17–7 (7–3)	Lavietes Pavilion (2,195); Cambridge, MA
February 24, 2012; 7:00 pm, YES		Columbia	L 64–67	18–7 (8–3)	John J. Lee Amphitheater (1,821); New Haven, CT
February 25, 2012; 7:00 pm		Cornell	W 71–40	19–7 (9–3)	John J. Lee Amphitheater (1,675); New Haven, CT
March 2, 2012; 7:00 pm		at Princeton	L 57–64	19–8 (9–4)	Jadwin Gymnasium (2,293); Princeton, NJ
March 3, 2012; 7:00 pm		at Penn	L 47–68	19–9 (9–5)	The Palestra (4,962); Philadelphia, PA
CollegeInsider.com Tournament
March 14, 2012*; 7:00 pm		at Fairfield; First Round	L 56–68	19–10	Webster Bank Arena (1,744); Bridgeport, CT
*Non-conference game. ^{#}Rankings from AP Poll. (#) Tournament seedings in parentheses. All times are in Eastern Time.

=== All-Ivy ===
The following players earned Ivy League postseason recognition:

Defensive Player of the Year

- Reggie Willhite, Yale (Sr., G/F, Elk Grove, Calif.)

First Team All-Ivy

- Greg Mangano, Yale (Sr., C, Orange, Conn.)

Second Team All-Ivy

- Reggie Willhite, Yale (Sr., G/F, Elk Grove, Calif.)
