= 2011–12 Penn Quakers men's basketball team =

American college basketball season

2011–12 Penn Quakers men's basketball

CBI, Quarterfinals
- Conference: Ivy League
- Record: 20–13 (11–3 Ivy)
- Head coach: Jerome Allen (3rd season)
- Assistant coaches: Dan Leibovitz; Mike Martin; Rudy Wise
- Home arena: The Palestra

2011–12 Ivy League men's basketball standings
	Conf.				Overall
Team	W		L	PCT	W		L	PCT
Harvard	12	–	2	.857	26	–	5	.839
Penn	11	–	3	.786	20	–	13	.606
Princeton	10	–	4	.714	20	–	12	.625
Yale	9	–	5	.643	19	–	10	.655
Cornell	7	–	7	.500	12	–	16	.429
Columbia	4	–	10	.286	15	–	15	.500
Brown	2	–	12	.143	8	–	23	.258
Dartmouth	1	–	13	.071	5	–	25	.167
As of March 15, 2012; Rankings from AP Poll

The 2011–12 Penn Quakers men's basketball team represented the University of Pennsylvania during the 2011–12 NCAA Division I men's basketball season. The Quakers, led by third year head coach Jerome Allen, played their home games at The Palestra and are members of the Ivy League. They finished the season 20–13, 11–3 in Ivy League play to finish in second place. They were invited to the 2012 College Basketball Invitational where they defeated Quinnipiac in first round before falling in the quarterfinals to Butler.

== Roster ==
Number	Name	Position	Height	Weight	Year	Hometown
0	Miles Jackson-Cartwright	Guard	6–3	175	Sophomore	Van Nuys, California
1	Zack Rosen	Guard	6–1	170	Senior	Colonia, New Jersey
2	Simeon Esprit	Guard	6–6	175	Freshman	London, England
3	Henry Brooks	Forward	6–8	215	Freshman	Fairburn, Georgia
4	Tyler Bernardini	Guard	6–6	210	Senior	Carlsbad, California
11	Marin Kukoc	Guard/Forward	6–7	185	Sophomore	Highland Park, Illinois
12	Fran Dougherty	Forward	6–8	225	Sophomore	New Britain, Pennsylvania
13	Larry Loughery	Forward	6–8	210	Senior	Gwynedd Valley, Pennsylvania
14	Keelan Cairns	Forward	6–10	210	Freshman	Belfast, Northern Ireland
15	Camryn Crocker	Guard	6–3	170	Freshman	Cypress, California
20	Dau Jok	Guard	6–4	180	Sophomore	Des Moines, Iowa
21	Cameron Gunter	Forward/Center	6–9	205	Sophomore	Morton, Pennsylvania
22	Steve Rennard	Guard	6–2	175	Sophomore	Hazlet, New Jersey
23	Greg Louis	Forward	6–7	215	Freshman	West Palm Beach, Florida
30	Patrick Lucas-Perry	Guard	5–11	165	Freshman	Grand Blanc, Michigan
33	Mike Howlett	Center	6–9	220	Senior	Amesbury, Massachusetts
34	Rob Belcore	Guard	6–6	224	Senior	Lake Forest, Illinois

== Schedule ==
Date time, TV	Rank^{#}	Opponent^{#}	Result	Record	Site (attendance) city, state
Exhibition
November 5, 2011*; 4:30 pm		Carleton	W 74–72	—	The Palestra; Philadelphia, PA
Regular Season
November 11, 2011*; 7:30 pm		at UMBC	W 59–45	1–0	Retriever Activities Center (2,352); Catonsville, MD
November 14, 2011*; 7:00 pm		Temple; Big 5 Game	L 67–73 ^{OT}	1–1	The Palestra (6,273); Philadelphia, PA
November 17, 2011*; 7:00 pm		at Rider; Philly Hoop Group Classic	L 72–78 ^{OT}	2–1	Alumni Gymnasium (1,590); Lawrenceville, New Jersey
November 19, 2011*; 7:00 pm		Robert Morris; Philly Hoop Group Classic	W 66–60	3–1	The Palestra (3,089); Philadelphia, PA
November 22, 2011*; 7:00 pm		Wagner	L 65–71	3–2	The Palestra (2,144); Philadelphia, PA
November 25, 2011*; 7:00 pm, TCN		No. 17 Pittsburgh; Philly Hoop Group Classic	L 58–78	3–3	The Palestra (6,843); Philadelphia, PA
November 26, 2011*; 7:00 pm, TCN		James Madison; Philly Hoop Group Classic	L 58–60	3–4	The Palestra (2,824); Philadelphia, PA
November 29, 2011*; 7:00 pm		Manhattan	W 75–72	4–4	The Palestra (1,938); Philadelphia, PA
December 3, 2011*; 7:00 pm, ESPN3		at Villanova; Big 5 Game	L 65–73	4–5	The Pavilion (6,500); Villanova, PA
December 7, 2011*; 7:00 pm		Delaware	W 66–60	5–5	The Palestra (2,351); Philadelphia, PA
December 10, 2011*; 7:00 pm, FSWest		vs. UCLA	L 73–77	5–6	Honda Center (6,332); Anaheim, CA
December 23, 2011*; 7:00 pm		Marist	W 84–71	6–6	The Palestra (2,513); Philadelphia, PA
December 29, 2011*; 7:00 pm		at Davidson	L 70–75	6–7	John M. Belk Arena (4,064); Davidson, NC
January 1, 2012*; 5:00 pm, ESPNU		at No. 7 Duke	L 55–85	6–8	Cameron Indoor Stadium (9,314); Durham, NC
January 4, 2012*; 7:00 pm		at Lafayette	W 78–73	7–8	Kirby Sports Center (2,037); Easton, PA
January 10, 2012*; 7:00 pm		La Salle; Big 5 Game	L 57–68	7–9	The Palestra (4,480); Philadelphia, PA
January 13, 2012; 7:00 pm		at Columbia	W 66–64	8–9 (1–0)	Levien Gymnasium (2,029); New York City, NY
January 14, 2012; 7:00 pm		at Cornell	W 64–52	9–9 (2–0)	Newman Arena (2,029); Ithaca, NY
January 21, 2012*; 7:00 pm		Saint Joseph's; Big 5 Game	W 84–80	10–9	The Palestra (8,722); Philadelphia, PA
January 30, 2012; 7:00 pm		Princeton; Penn–Princeton Rivalry	W 84–80	11–9 (3–0)	The Palestra (6,835); Philadelphia, PA
February 3, 2012; 7:00 pm		at Yale	L 53–60	11–10 (3–1)	Payne Whitney Gymnasium (2,012); New Haven, CT
February 4, 2012; 6:00 pm		at Brown	W 65–48	12–10 (4–1)	Pizzitola Sports Center (1,075); Providence, RI
February 10, 2012; 7:00 pm		No. 25 Harvard	L 50–56	12–11 (4–2)	The Palestra (7,462); Philadelphia, PA
February 11, 2012; 7:00 pm		Dartmouth	W 58–55	13–11 (5–2)	The Palestra (3,824); Philadelphia, PA
February 17, 2012; 7:00 pm		Cornell	W 73–66	14–11 (6–2)	The Palestra (3,529); Philadelphia, PA
February 18, 2012; 7:00 pm		Columbia	W 61–59 ^{OT}	15–11 (7–2)	The Palestra (4,103); Philadelphia, PA
February 24, 2012; 7:00 pm		at Dartmouth	W 57–54	16–11 (8–2)	Leede Arena (802); Hanover, NH
February 25, 2012; 7:00 pm		at Harvard	W 55–54	17–11 (9–2)	Lavietes Pavilion (2,195); Cambridge, MA
March 2, 2012; 7:00 pm		Brown	W 54–43	18–11 (10–2)	The Palestra (2,834); Philadelphia, PA
March 3, 2012; 7:00 pm		Yale	W 68–47	19–11 (11–2)	The Palestra (4,962); Philadelphia, PA
March 6, 2012; 7:30 pm, ESPN3		at Princeton; Penn–Princeton Rivalry	L 52–62	19–12 (11–3)	Jadwin Gymnasium (3,590); Princeton, NJ
CBI
March 14, 2012*; 7:30 pm		Quinnipiac; First Round	W 74–68	20–12	The Palestra (1,268); Philadelphia, PA
March 19, 2012*; 8:00 pm, HDNet		Butler; Quarterfinals	L 53–63	20–13	The Palestra (3,864); Philadelphia, PA
*Non-conference game. ^{#}Rankings from AP Poll. (#) Tournament seedings in parentheses. All times are in Eastern Time.

== Post season awards ==
=== All-Ivy ===
The following players earned Ivy League postseason recognition:

Player of the Year

- ^Zack Rosen, Penn (Sr., G, Colonia, N.J.)

First Team All-Ivy

- ^Zack Rosen, Penn (Sr., G, Colonia, N.J.)

Honorable Mention All-Ivy

- Rob Belcore, Penn (Sr., G, Lake Forest, Ill.)
- ^Unanimous Selection
