= Mitch Henderson =

American college basketball coach (born 1975)

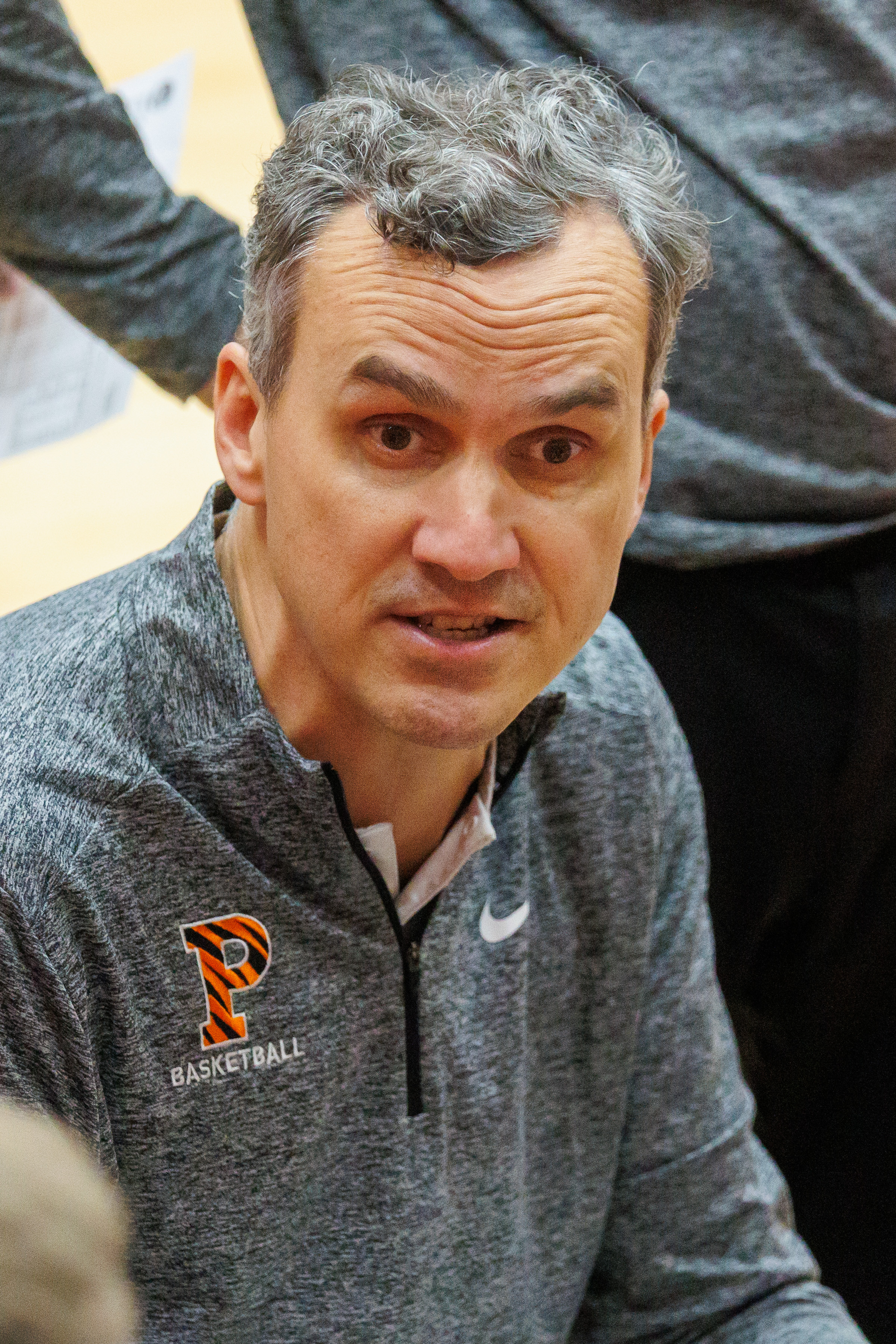

Current position
- Title: Head coach
- Team: Princeton
- Conference: Ivy
- Record: 264–155 (.630)

Biographical details
- Born: August 14, 1975 (age 51); Vincennes, Indiana, U.S.

Playing career
- 1994–1998: Princeton
- 1998–1999: Sligo

Coaching career (HC unless noted)
- 2000–2011: Northwestern (assistant)
- 2011–present: Princeton

Head coaching record
- Overall: 264–155 (.630)
- Tournaments: 2–2 (NCAA Division I); 0–3 (NIT); 2–2 (CBI)

Accomplishments and honors

Championships
- 4 Ivy League regular season (2017, 2022, 2023, 2024); 2 Ivy League tournament (2017, 2023)

Awards
- Second-team All-Ivy (1998); 2× Ivy League Coach of the Year (2017, 2024)

Mitchell Gordon Henderson (born August 14, 1975) is an American college basketball coach, currently the head coach for the Princeton Tigers men's basketball team. Before taking the Princeton job in 2011, he was an assistant for the Northwestern Wildcats men's basketball team for 11 seasons under Bill Carmody. Henderson was a member of three consecutive Ivy League championship Princeton teams as a player (two of which went undefeated in conference, the first tying the school record with 19 consecutive wins and the second achieving 20). He was a co-captain of the second of these undefeated league champions along with Steve Goodrich.

== Early life ==
Born in Vincennes, Indiana, Henderson later lived in Lexington, Kentucky as a teenager and attended Culver Military Academy in Culver, Indiana for high school. Henderson was a twelve-time varsity letter winner at Culver in football, basketball and baseball. In 1994, he was drafted by the New York Yankees with the 24th pick of the 29th round, 815th overall in the 1994 Major League Baseball draft. In baseball, he was a pitcher, and in football, a quarterback. He was named the 1994 South Bend Tribune high school Male Athlete of the Year. He did not sign with the Yankees and retained his amateur status although he chose to pursue basketball rather than baseball in college.

As a basketball player, he was a four-year starter at Princeton University, where he was captain of the Ivy League champion 1997–98 Princeton Tigers men's basketball team as well as a member of the 1995–96 and 1996–97 conference champions, coached by Pete Carril and Carmody, respectively. His two final teams were undefeated in conference play. The 1995–96 team was notable for its upset of the defending national champion UCLA Bruins in the 1996 NCAA tournament.

The 1996–97 team finished the regular season on a school record 19-game winning streak. In the 1997 NCAA Division I men's basketball tournament, against the fifth-seeded California Golden Bears, the team lost 55–52. Henderson had tied the score at 50 with 1:37 to play. Henderson was a 1997 honorable mention All-Ivy League selection.

The 1997–98 team posted a 27–2 overall record, reached the top 10 in the national polls, and achieved a 14–0 conference record. The Tigers entered the 1998 NCAA Division I men's basketball tournament on a 19-game winning streak and finished the season ranked eighth in the final USAToday/NABC Coaches Poll. He was a 1998 2nd team All-Ivy League selection. In the 1998 tournament opening game for the fifth-seeded Tigers, he scored 19 points to help them defeat the UNLV Runnin' Rebels 69–57, which marked the team's 20th consecutive win—a school record.

He was briefly a member of the Atlanta Hawks of the National Basketball Association during the 1998–99 NBA season, but he did not appear in any regular season games. He also played professional basketball in Sligo, Ireland, from August 1998 to January 1999.

== Coaching career ==
Henderson was an assistant to his former coach Carmody during Carmody's first eleven seasons as the coach at Northwestern University. Carmody used Henderson, who commonly scrimmaged with the players, as part of a joke for a Sports Illustrated: "I don't mind that Mitch is cagier and smarter than all those guys on the court. The thing that bothers me is that he's faster than all of them." During Henderson's final three seasons at Northwestern, the team qualified for the National Invitation Tournament.

Henderson was selected to replace outgoing Princeton head coach Sydney Johnson. He inherited a 2010–11 team that narrowly lost to Kentucky in its opening game of the 2011 NCAA Division I men's basketball tournament. The team returned its 2nd leading scorer and rebounder, Ian Hummer, who as a sophomore was a 2nd team All-Ivy selection.

With a new head coach who was also a first-time head coach, the 2011–12 Tigers got off to a slow start with a 1–5 record, but won 18 of its final 24 games and started its conference schedule with a 2–3 record, but won 8 of its final 9 games. Eventually, Princeton earned its first home win against a ranked opponent since the 1976–77 team's January 3, 1977 victory over Notre Dame by defeating Harvard (No. 21 Coaches/25 AP) on February 11, 2012. The win was also its first against a ranked opponent on any court since November 11, 1997, when the 1997–98 team opened its season with a victory over a ranked Texas team at Meadowlands Arena in East Rutherford, New Jersey. Princeton also defeated eventual 2012 ACC men's basketball tournament champion Florida State five weeks after Harvard did. The team qualified for the 2012 CBI tournament and posted a first-round 95–86 victory over Evansville. In the subsequent game against Pittsburgh, Princeton lost 82–61 to end its season.

The 2012–13 Tigers finished with a 17–11 (10–4) record on the season.

The 2013–14 team lost in the second round of the 2nd Round CBI to finish with a 21–9 (8–6) record. In his sixth season, he earned unanimous recognition as Ivy League Coach of the Year for the 2016–17 Tigers.

On December 29, 2018, the 2018–19 Princeton Tigers team defeated the number 17-ranked Arizona State 67–66. It was Princeton's first win over a ranked opponent since defeating the 25th-ranked 2011–12 Harvard Crimson on February 11, 2012, and the school's first win over a top-20 opponent since Henderson was a player on the 1995–96 Princeton team that upset the UCLA Bruins in the 1996 NCAA Division I men's basketball tournament. In the 2021–22 campaign, Princeton resumed its success in the Ivy League, winning the regular-season title. It was Henderson's second league title in his tenure at Princeton. The 23-win campaign tied for the winningest season during his time at Princeton. The season saw junior forward Tosan Evbuomwan win Ivy League Player of the Year honors. Evbuomwan was surrounded by a supporting cast of All-Ivy League honorees, including first-teamer Jaelin Llewellyn, and second-team Ethan Wright.

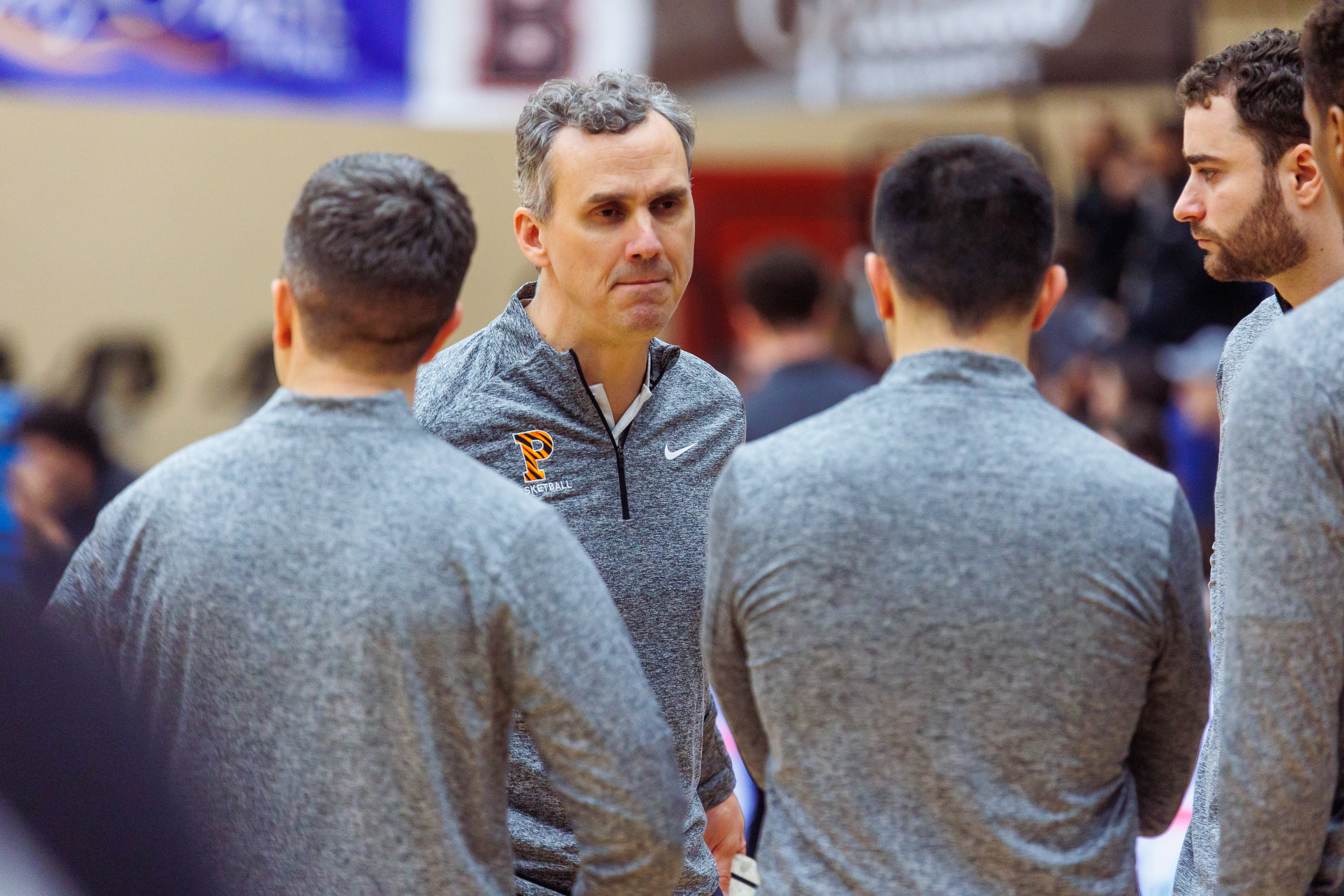
Henderson and players in 2023

To start the 2022–23 season, the Tigers traveled across the pond to London, England, where they competed in the London Basketball Classic. The pool of teams there included Army, Northeastern, Manhattan, and Princeton. Princeton defeated Army in the semifinals and Northeastern in the finals to win the championship. Senior and returning Ivy League Player of the Year, Tosan Evbuomwan, garnered MVP honors in his home country.

On January 7, 2023, Henderson won his 100th Ivy League game as head coach at Princeton, beating the Cornell Big Red, 75–68, in Ithaca, NY. Henderson is only the eighth all-time Ivy League coach to win 100 league games. He is the second head coach in the history of Princeton men's basketball to win 100 league games; Carril was other to reach that threshold.

In March 2023, Henderson guided the 2022–23 Princeton Tigers into the Sweet 16 of the NCAA D1 men's basketball tournament with wins over #2 seed, Arizona, and #7 Missouri.

== Personal ==
Henderson earned his A.B. from Princeton in 1998 in economics. He and his wife Ashley reside in Princeton with their three children.

== Head coaching record ==
Record table
Season	Team	Overall	Conference	Standing	Postseason
Princeton Tigers (Ivy League) (2011–present)
2011–12	Princeton	20–12	10–4	3rd	CBI Quarterfinals
2012–13	Princeton	17–11	10–4	2nd	
2013–14	Princeton	21–9	8–6	3rd	CBI Quarterfinals
2014–15	Princeton	16–14	9–5	3rd	
2015–16	Princeton	22–7	12–2	2nd	NIT first round
2016–17	Princeton	23–7	14–0	1st	NCAA Division I Round of 64
2017–18	Princeton	13–16	5–9	T–5th	
2018–19	Princeton	16–12	8–6	3rd	
2019–20	Princeton	14–13	9–5	3rd	
2021–22	Princeton	23–7	11–2	1st	NIT first round
2022–23	Princeton	23–9	10–4	T–1st	NCAA Division I Sweet 16
2023–24	Princeton	24–5	12–2	1st	NIT First Round
2024–25	Princeton	19–11	8–6	T–3rd	
2025–26	Princeton	9–20	5–9	T–5th	
2026-27	Princeton	4–2	0–0		
Princeton:		264–155 (.630)	130–64 (.670)		
Total:		264–155 (.630)			
National champion Postseason invitational champion Conference regular season champion Conference regular season and conference tournament champion Division regular season champion Division regular season and conference tournament champion Conference tournament champion
