= 2011–12 Princeton Tigers men's basketball team =

American college basketball season

2011–12 Princeton Tigers men's basketball

CBI, Quarterfinals
- Conference: Ivy League
- Record: 20–12 (10–4 Ivy, 3rd)
- Head coach: Mitch Henderson (1st season)
- Assistant coaches: Brian Earl; Dan Geriot; Marcus Jenkins
- Captains: Douglas Davis; Patrick Saunders
- Home arena: Jadwin Gymnasium

2011–12 Ivy League men's basketball standings
	Conf.				Overall
Team	W		L	PCT	W		L	PCT
Harvard	12	–	2	.857	26	–	5	.839
Penn	11	–	3	.786	20	–	13	.606
Princeton	10	–	4	.714	20	–	12	.625
Yale	9	–	5	.643	19	–	10	.655
Cornell	7	–	7	.500	12	–	16	.429
Columbia	4	–	10	.286	15	–	15	.500
Brown	2	–	12	.143	8	–	23	.258
Dartmouth	1	–	13	.071	5	–	25	.167
As of March 15, 2012; Rankings from AP Poll

The 2011–12 Princeton Tigers men's basketball team represented Princeton University during the 2011–12 NCAA Division I men's basketball season. The Tigers, led by first year head coach Mitch Henderson, played their home games at Jadwin Gymnasium and are members of the Ivy League. The team captains were seniors Douglas Davis and Patrick Saunders. They finished the season 20–12, 10–4 in Ivy League play to finish in third place. They were invited to the 2012 College Basketball Invitational where they defeated Evansville in the first round before falling in the quarterfinals to Pittsburgh. The season was highlighted by wins over a ranked Harvard team and the Florida State Seminoles. The team was led by unanimous first team All-Ivy League selection Ian Hummer and second team selection Douglas Davis.

== Preview ==
Princeton entered the season having won the 2010–11 Ivy League men's basketball season championship and having earned the resulting 2011 NCAA Division I men's basketball tournament invitation. The team entered the season having lost senior captains Dan Mavraides and Kareem Maddox. Maddox was the reigning Ivy League Defensive Player of the Year and a unanimous first team All-Ivy selection. Mavraides had been a second team All-Ivy selection. The team returned second team All-Ivy selection Hummer.

Entering the 2011–12 NCAA Division I men's basketball season head coach Mitch Henderson began his tenure at Princeton, taking over for Sydney Johnson. With the move that resulted from Johnson taking a new coaching job, Princeton has six alumni who are active Division I head coaches, a total second only to eight by the North Carolina Tar Heels men's basketball program. The Ivy League media poll selected Princeton to be tied with Yale for second place behind Harvard. Princeton had been the preseason favorite the year before.

== Roster ==
Number	Name	Position	Height	Weight	Year	Hometown
3	Jimmy Sherburne	Guard	6–3	197	Junior	Whitefish Bay, Wisconsin
4	Denton Koon	Forward	6–8	205	Freshman	Liberty, Missouri
5	T.J. Bray	Guard	6–5	205	Sophomore	New Berlin, Wisconsin
11	Brian Fabrizius	Forward	6–11	210	Freshman	Arlington Heights, Illinois
14	Chris Clement	Guard	6–2	190	Sophomore	Round Rock, Texas
15	John Comfort	Forward	6–7	197	Senior	La Grange, Illinois
20	Douglas Davis	Guard	5–11	157	Senior	Philadelphia
22	Patrick Saunders	Forward	6–8	205	Senior	Gilford, New Hampshire
23	Clay Wilson	Guard	6–3	176	Freshman	Tulsa, Oklahoma
25	Tom Noonan	Forward	6–8	235	Sophomore	Havertown, Pennsylvania
32	Mack Darrow	Forward	6–9	230	Junior	Lake Barrington, Illinois
34	Ian Hummer	Forward	6–7	230	Junior	Vienna, Virginia
40	Bobby Garbade	Center	6–11	245	Freshman	Binghamton, New York
41	Daniel Edwards	Forward	6–8	225	Sophomore	Dallas, Texas
44	Brendan Connolly	Center	6–11	255	Junior	Brentwood, Tennessee

== Schedule ==
With a new first-time head coach, the team got off to slow starts. It started the season with a 1–5 record, but won 18 of its final 24 games and started its conference schedule with a 2–3 record, but won 8 of its final 9 games. The recovery enabled the team to qualify for its 32nd post season appearance (24 NCAA, 5 NIT and 2 CBI).

Princeton earned its first home win against a ranked opponent since the 1976–77 team's January 3, 1977, victory over Notre Dame by defeating Harvard (No. 21 Coaches/25 AP) on February 11, 2012. The win was also its first against a ranked opponent on any court since November 11, 1997, which is when the 1997–98 team opened its season with a victory over a ranked Texas team at Meadowlands Arena (now named Izod Center) in East Rutherford, New Jersey. Princeton also defeated eventual 2012 ACC men's basketball tournament champion Florida State five weeks after Harvard did as well as Big East Conference member and New Jersey rival Rutgers. In addition, the team's schedule included the ACC's NC State. Its results against Harvard, Florida State and NC State give the team a 2–2 record against teams in the 2012 NCAA Division I men's basketball tournament.

For the 18th consecutive season, the Ivy League men's basketball schedule concluded with a Tuesday Penn–Princeton basketball rivalry game against the 2011–12 Quakers. Princeton's 62–52 victory enabled it to retain slim 26–25 and 24–23 leads in terms of Ivy League Championships and Ivy League team NCAA Tournament appearances, respectively.

In the first round of the 2012 CBI Tournament, senior Douglas Davis scored a career-high 31 points to lead Princeton to a 95–86 victory over Evansville. Although Davis posted another 20 points in the subsequent quarterfinal game against Pittsburgh to surpass Kit Mueller for second place on the Princeton scoring list, Princeton lost 82–61 to end the season. Davis' appearance in the March 19 contest also enabled him to surpass Ryan Wittman as the Ivy League's all-time leader in games played (122). Pittsburgh eventually went on to win the tournament.

Date time, TV	Rank^{#}	Opponent^{#}	Result	Record	Site (attendance) city, state
Regular Season
11/12/2011*; 5:00 pm, FiOS1		Wagner	L 57–73	0–1	Jadwin Gymnasium (2,444); Princeton, New Jersey
11/16/2011*; 7:00 pm, ESPNU		at NC State; Legends Classic	L 58–60	0–2	RBC Center (12,140); Raleigh, North Carolina
11/19/2011*; 12:30 pm, FiOS1		Buffalo	W 61–53	1–2	Jadwin Gymnasium (1,715); Princeton, New Jersey
11/22/2011*; 7:00 pm, FiOS1		Elon	L 55–56	1–3	Jadwin Gymnasium (1,498); Princeton, New Jersey
11/25/2011*; 6:00 pm		at Bucknell; Legends Classic	L 56–62	1–4	Sojka Pavilion (2,488); Lewisburg, Pennsylvania
11/26/2011*; 2:00 pm		vs. Morehead State; Legends Classic	L 56–68	1–5	Sojka Pavilion (NA); Lewisburg, Pennsylvania
11/27/2011*; 2:00 pm		vs. West Alabama; Legends Classic	W 66–42	2–5	Sojka Pavilion (NA); Lewisburg, Pennsylvania
11/30/2011*; 7:00 pm, FiOS1		Lafayette	W 69–54	3–5	Jadwin Gymnasium (1,542); Princeton, New Jersey
12/07/2011*; 7:30 pm		at Rutgers; Rivalry	W 59–57	4–5	The RAC (3,406); Piscataway, New Jersey
12/10/2011*; 4:00 pm		at Drexel	L 60–64	4–6	Daskalakis Athletic Center (2,225); Philadelphia
12/14/2011*; 7:00 pm, TCN		at Rider	W 72–71 ^{OT}	5–6	Alumni Gymnasium (1,650); Lawrenceville, New Jersey
12/18/2011*; 1:00 pm		at Northeastern	W 71–62	6–6	Matthews Arena (938); Boston
12/22/2011*; 7:00 pm, TWCSN		at Siena	L 59–63	6–7	Times Union Center (6,471); Albany, New York
12/30/2011*; 7:00 pm, ESPN3		at Florida State	W 75–73 ^{3OT}	7–7	Donald L. Tucker Center (6,670); Tallahassee, Florida
01/01/2012*; 3:00 pm		at Florida A&M	W 76–61	8–7	Teaching Gym (353); Tallahassee, Florida
01/08/2012*; 2:00 pm		The College of New Jersey	W 79–68	9–7	Jadwin Gymnasium (2,246); Princeton, New Jersey
01/13/2012; 7:00 pm		at Cornell	L 59–67	9–8 (0–1)	Newman Arena (1,843); Ithaca, New York
01/14/2012; 7:00 pm		at Columbia	W 62–58	10–8 (1–1)	Levien Gymnasium (1,764); New York
01/30/2012; 7:00 pm		at Penn; Penn–Princeton Rivalry	L 67–82	10–9 (1–2)	The Palestra (6,835); Philadelphia
02/03/2012; 7:00 pm		at Brown	W 77–63	11–9 (2–2)	Pizzitola Sports Center (905); Providence, Rhode Island
02/04/2012; 7:00 pm		at Yale	L 54–58	11–10 (2–3)	Payne Whitney Gymnasium (2,175); New Haven, Connecticut
02/10/2012; 7:00 pm		Dartmouth	W 59–47	12–10 (3–3)	Jadwin Gymnasium (2,152); Princeton, New Jersey
02/11/2012; 7:00 pm, ESPNU		No. 25 Harvard	W 70–62	13–10 (4–3)	Jadwin Gymnasium (5,266); Princeton, New Jersey
02/17/2012; 7:00 pm, ESPNU		Columbia	W 77–66	14–10 (5–3)	Jadwin Gymnasium (2,751); Princeton, New Jersey
02/18/2012; 6:00 pm		Cornell	W 75–57	15–10 (6–3)	Jadwin Gymnasium (3,147); Princeton, New Jersey
02/24/2012; 7:00 pm		at Harvard	L 64–67	15–11 (6–4)	Lavietes Pavilion (2,195); Cambridge, Massachusetts
02/25/2012; 7:00 pm		at Dartmouth	W 85–61	16–11 (7–4)	Leede Arena (1,008); Hanover, New Hampshire
03/02/2012; 7:00 pm		Yale	W 64–57	17–11 (8–4)	Jadwin Gymnasium (2,293); Princeton, New Jersey
03/03/2012; 7:30 pm		Brown	W 81–47	18–11 (9–4)	Jadwin Gymnasium (2,219); Princeton, New Jersey
03/06/2012; 7:30 pm, ESPN3		Penn; Penn–Princeton Rivalry	W 62–52	19–11 (10–4)	Jadwin Gymnasium (3,590); Princeton, New Jersey
2012 CBI
03/13/2012*; 8:00 pm, HDNet		at Evansville; First Roud	W 95–86	20–11	Ford Center (3,012); Evansville, Indiana
03/19/2012*; 7:00 pm		at Pittsburgh; Quarterfinals	L 61–82	20–12	Peterson Events Center (2,001); Pittsburgh
*Non-conference game. ^{#}Rankings from AP Poll. (#) Tournament seedings in parentheses. All times are in Eastern Time.

=== All-Ivy ===
The following players earned Ivy League postseason recognition:

First Team All-Ivy

- ^Ian Hummer, Princeton (Jr., F, Vienna, Virginia)

Second Team All-Ivy

- Douglas Davis, Princeton (Sr., G, Philadelphia)
- ^Unanimous Selection

=== Other ===
The National Association of Basketball Coaches announced their Division I All-District District 13 team on March 14, recognizing the nation's best men's collegiate basketball student-athletes. Ian Hummer was a second team selection.
