= Imperial Arena =

Event venue at Atlantis Paradise Island

- Interactive map of Imperial Arena
- Address: One Casino Drive, Suite 40, Paradise Island, Nassau, Bahamas
- Coordinates: 25.0836°N 77.318°W
- Owner: Kerzner International
- Capacity: 3,500
- Field size: 289 ft × 165 ft (88 m × 50 m)

Construction
- Opened: November 2007
- Years active: 2007–present
- Architect: HKS Architects
- General contractor: Crow Jones Buffette

Tenants
- Atlantis Paradise Island (2007–present); Battle 4 Atlantis (2011–2019, 2021–present)

Website
- www.atlantisbahamas.com/b4a

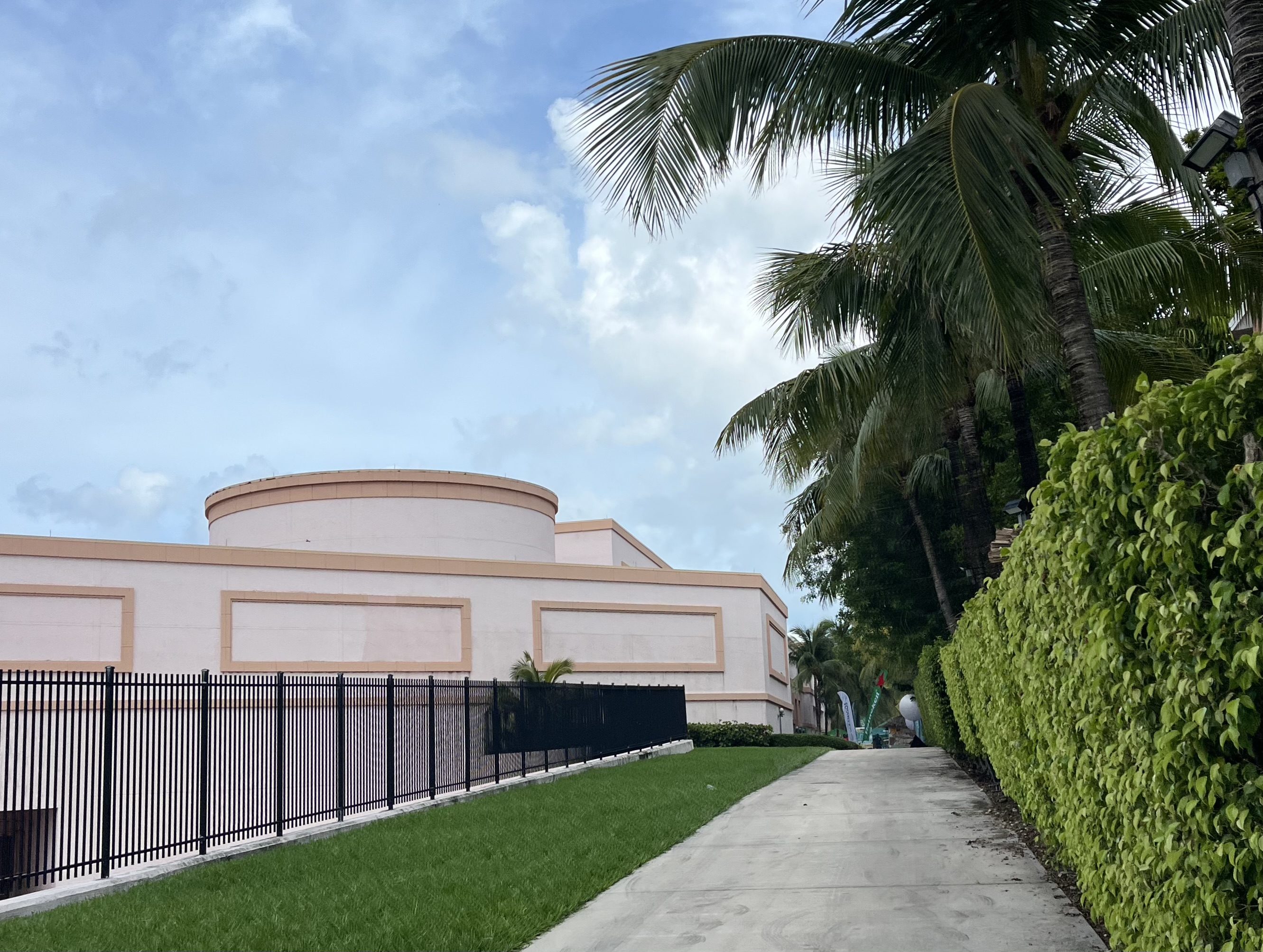
Imperial Ballroom

Imperial Arena or Imperial Ballroom is a multipurpose venue used as a ballroom, convention space, and a basketball arena located at Atlantis Paradise Island. It's most known for being the host of the Battle 4 Atlantis, a men's and women's early-season college basketball tournament that takes place in late November, around Thanksgiving.

== Basketball ==
Although the ballroom opened in November 2007, it didn't undergo transformation until November 2011 when the inaugural Battle 4 Atlantis was played. The Ballroom is 50,000 sq ft (4,600 m^{2}), has dimensions of 289 ft × 165 ft (88 m × 50 m) and has a 26 ft (7.9 m) ceiling, making it one of the lowest ceilings for a college basketball venue.

== Music ==
Taylor Swift performed at the Imperial Arena on 19 June 2010, as part of her Fearless Tour.

== Reception ==
NC State head coach Kevin Keatts compared the arena and its 3,500-seat capacity to playing in a smaller Division I venue where fans are packed into a more intimate environment. Keatts stated, "It's packed and it's fun and can get going in there, it's an exciting place to play."

Baylor head coach and NCAA champion Scott Drew said, "When they walked in, they saw it (Imperial Arena), they saw the lighting, they saw what quality of floor it was, they were really excited to play here. You know what, sometimes when you do things different, it's really neat and something they'll always remember."

Preceded by Crown Convention Center, Nha Trang; Vietnam	Miss Universe venue 2009	Succeeded by Mandalay Bay Events Center, Las Vegas, Nevada; United States
