= Battle 4 Atlantis =

College basketball tournament

- Sport: College basketball
- Founded: 2011 (men); 2020 (women)
- Founder: Kerzner International
- No. of teams: 8
- Country: Bahamas
- Venues: Imperial Arena; Paradise Island, The Bahamas
- Most recent champions: Vanderbilt (Men's); North Carolina (Women's)
- Most titles: Villanova (3)
- Broadcaster: ESPN
- Sponsor: Marriott Bonvoy
- Website: Battle4Atlantis

The Battle 4 Atlantis is an early-season college basketball tournament. It takes place at Atlantis Paradise Island on Paradise Island in The Bahamas, on the week of the US holiday of Thanksgiving. For sponsorship purposes, the tournament is officially named Marriott Bonvoy Battle 4 Atlantis. The games are played in the Imperial Arena, a grand ballroom which is turned into a basketball venue. The tournament is known for being the richest Division I men's early-season college basketball tournament. Schools are awarded $2 million in exchange for their participation in the men's event.

In 2020, the tournament was canceled due to the COVID-19 pandemic, which was scheduled to include a women's Battle 4 Atlantis tournament which also would have featured eight teams.

== Tournament history ==
=== Tournament champions ===
==== Men's ====
Year	Winner	Score	Opponent	Tournament MVP
2011	Harvard	59–49	UCF	Keith Wright, Harvard
2012	Duke	76–71	Louisville	Quinn Cook, Duke
2013	Villanova	88–83^{OT}	Iowa	James Bell, Villanova
2014	Wisconsin	69–56	Oklahoma	Frank Kaminsky, Wisconsin
2015	Syracuse	74–67	Texas A&M	Michael Gbinije, Syracuse
2016	Baylor	66–63	Louisville	Johnathan Motley, Baylor
2017	Villanova	64–50	Northern Iowa	Jalen Brunson, Villanova
2018	Virginia	53–46	Wisconsin	De'Andre Hunter, Virginia
2019	Michigan	82–64	Gonzaga	Jon Teske, Michigan
2020	Canceled due to COVID-19			
2021	Baylor	75–58	Michigan State	James Akinjo, Baylor
2022	Tennessee	64–50	Kansas	Santiago Véscovi, Tennessee
2023	Villanova	79–63	Memphis	Eric Dixon, Villanova
2024	Oklahoma	69–64	Louisville	Jalon Moore, Oklahoma
2025	Vanderbilt	96–71	Saint Mary's	Duke Miles, Vanderbilt

==== Women's ====
Year	Winner	Score	Opponent	Tournament MVP
2020	Canceled due to COVID-19			
2021	South Carolina	73–53	UConn	Aliyah Boston, South Carolina
2022	UCLA	66–58^{OT}	Marquette	Charisma Osborne, UCLA
2023	Ole Miss	60–49	Michigan	Madison Scott, Ole Miss
2024	North Carolina	69–39	Indiana	Alyssa Ustby, North Carolina

=== Men's Mainland bracket champions ===
Year	Winner	Score	Opponent
2012	Florida Gulf Coast	72–66	Toledo
2014	Chattanooga	78–67	Coastal Carolina
2015	Texas A&M–CC	85–81	Elon
2017	UMBC	89–88	Nicholls State

== Men's appearances and championships ==
Team	Appearances	Championships	Years	Tournament Record
UConn	3		2011, 2015, 2021	5–4 (.556)
UNC Asheville	1		2011	1–2 (.333)
UCF	1		2011	2–1 (.667)
Charleston	1		2011	2–1 (.667)
Utah	1		2011	0–3 (.000)
Harvard	1	1	2011	3–0 (1.000)
Florida State	1		2011	1–2 (.333)
UMass	1		2011	1–2 (.333)
Louisville	3		2012, 2016, 2024	6–3 (.667)
Northern Iowa	3		2012, 2017, 2023	3–6 (.333)
Missouri	1		2012	2–1 (.667)
Stanford	3		2012, 2018, 2023	3–6 (.333)
Memphis	2		2012, 2023	3–3 (.500)
VCU	4		2012, 2016, 2021, 2025	6–6 (.500)
Duke	1	1	2012	3–0 (1.000)
Minnesota	1		2012	2–1 (.667)
Kansas	2		2013, 2022	4–2 (.667)
Wake Forest	1		2013	1–2 (.333)
Villanova	3	3	2013, 2017, 2023	9–0 (1.000)
USC	2		2013, 2022	2–4 (.333)
Tennessee	3	1	2013, 2017, 2022	7–2 (.778)
UTEP	1		2013	1–2 (.333)
Xavier	1		2013	0–3 (.000)
Iowa	1		2013	2–1 (.667)
Wisconsin	3	1	2014, 2018, 2022	7–2 (.778)
UAB	1		2014	0–3 (.000)
Florida	2		2014, 2018	2–4 (.333)
Georgetown	1		2014	1–2 (.333)
UCLA	1		2014	1–2 (.333)
Oklahoma	3	1	2014, 2018, 2024	7–2 (.778)
Butler	3		2014, 2018, 2022	5–4 (.556)
North Carolina	3		2014, 2019, 2023	6–3 (.667)
Gonzaga	3		2015, 2019, 2024	6–3 (.667)
Washington	1		2015	1–2 (.333)
Texas A&M	1		2015	2–1 (.667)
Texas	1		2015	1–2 (.333)
Michigan	3	1	2015, 2019, 2023	6–3 (.667)
Charlotte	1		2015	0–3 (.000)
Syracuse	2	1	2015, 2021	4–2 (.667)
Michigan State	2		2016, 2021	4–2 (.667)
St. Johns	1		2016	0–3 (.000)
Baylor	2	2	2016, 2021	6–0 (1.000)
Wichita State	2		2016, 2025	1–5 (.200)
LSU	1		2016	1–2 (.333)
Old Dominion	1		2016	1–2 (.333)
Purdue	1		2017	1–2 (.333)
Western Kentucky	2		2017, 2025	3–2 (.667)
NC State	2		2017, 2022	3–3 (.500)
Arizona	2		2017, 2024	1–5 (.167)
SMU	1		2017	1–2 (.333)
Dayton	2		2018, 2022	1–5 (.167)
Virginia	1	1	2018	3–0 (1.000)
Middle Tennessee	1		2018	0–3 (.000)
Iowa State	1		2019	2–1 (.667)
Alabama	1		2019	1–2 (.333)
Southern Miss	1		2019	0–3 (.000)
Seton Hall	1		2019	2–1 (.667)
Oregon	1		2019	1–2 (.333)
Loyola	1		2021	1–2 (.333)
Auburn	1		2021	1–2 (.333)
Arizona State	1		2021	0–3 (.000)
BYU	1		2022	1–2 (.333)
Texas Tech	1		2023	2–1 (.667)
Arkansas	1		2023	1–2 (.333)
Indiana	1		2024	1–2 (.333)
West Virginia	1		2024	2–1 (.667)
Providence	1		2024	0–3 (.000)
Davidson	1		2024	1–2 (.333)
Vanderbilt	1	1	2025	3–0 (1.000)
Saint Mary's	1		2025	2–1 (.667)
Virginia Tech	1		2025	1–2 (.333)
Colorado State	1		2025	2–1 (.667)
South Florida	1		2025	1–2 (.333)

== Women's appearances and championships ==
Team	Appearances	Championships	Years	Tournament Record
South Carolina	1	1	2021	3–0 (1.000)
Oklahoma	1		2021	2–1 (.667)
South Florida	1		2021	2–1 (.667)
UConn	1		2021	2–1 (.667)
Buffalo	1		2021	1–2 (.333)
Minnesota	1		2021	1–2 (.333)
Oregon	1		2021	1–2 (.333)
Syracuse	1		2021	0–3 (.000)
UCLA	1	1	2022	3–0 (1.000)
Gonzaga	1		2022	2–1 (.667)
Marquette	1		2022	2–1 (.667)
South Dakota State	1		2022	2–1 (.667)
Louisville	1		2022	1–2 (.333)
Tennessee	1		2022	1–2 (.333)
Texas	1		2022	1–2 (.333)
Rutgers	1		2022	0–3 (.000)
Ole Miss	1	1	2023	3-0 (.1000)
Arizona	1		2023	2–1 (.667)
Michigan	1		2023	2–1 (.667)
Middle Tennessee	1		2023	2–1 (.667)
DePaul	1		2023	1–2 (.333)
Memphis	1		2023	1–2 (.333)
South Dakota	1		2023	1–2 (.333)
Howard	1		2023	0–3 (.000)
North Carolina	1	1	2024	3–0 (.1000)
Baylor	1		2024	2–1 (.667)
Columbia	1		2024	2–1 (.500)
Indiana	1		2024	2–1 (.667)
Ball State	1		2024	1–2 (.333)
Texas A&M	1		2024	1–2 (.333)
Villanova	1		2024	1–2 (.333)
Southern Miss	1		2024	0–3 (.000)
Maryland Eastern Shore	1		2025	0–2 (.000)
Penn State	1		2025	1–1 (.500)
Princeton	1		2025	2–0 (1.000)
San Diego State	1		2025	1–1 (.500)

== Brackets ==
=== 2025 ===
==== Men's ====
5th Place Game; Friday, November 28
South Florida	68
Colorado State	83
7th Place Game; Friday, November 29
Western Kentucky	75
Wichita State	70

Consolation 2nd Round; Thursday, November 27
Western Kentucky	91
South Florida	97*
Colorado State	76
Wichita State	70

First Round; Wednesday, November 26
24	Vanderbilt	83
Western Kentucky	78
South Florida	66
VCU	78
Virginia Tech	66
Colorado State	64
Saint Mary's	70
Wichita State	65

Semifinals; Thursday, November 27
24	Vanderbilt	89
VCU	74
Virginia Tech	66
Saint Mary's	77

Championship; Friday, November 28
24	Vanderbilt	96
Saint Mary's	71
3rd Place Game; Friday, November 28
VCU	86
Virginia Tech	68

* – Denotes overtime period

==== Women's ====
Game 1 November 22
Princeton	100
Penn State	93

Game 2 November 22
San Diego State	58
Maryland Eastern Shore	45

Game 3 November 23
Princeton	81
Maryland Eastern Shore	62

Game 4 November 24
Penn State	83
San Diego State	67

=== 2024 ===
==== Men's ====
5th Place Game; Friday, November 29
3	Gonzaga	90
Davidson	65
7th Place Game; Friday, November 29
14	Indiana	89
Providence	73

Consolation 2nd Round; Thursday, November 28
14	Indiana	73
3	Gonzaga	89
Providence	58
Davidson	69

First Round; Wednesday, November 27
Louisville	89
14	Indiana	61
West Virginia	86*
3	Gonzaga	78
Oklahoma	79
Providence	77
Davidson	72
24	Arizona	104

Semifinals; Thursday, November 28
Louisville	79*
West Virginia	70
Oklahoma	82
24	Arizona	77

Championship; Friday, November 29
Louisville	64
Oklahoma	69
3rd Place Game; Friday, November 29
West Virginia	83*
24	Arizona	76

* – Denotes overtime period

===== All-Tournament Team =====
- Jalon Moore − Oklahoma (MVP)
- Jeremiah Fears − Oklahoma
- Chucky Hepburn − Louisville
- Javon Small − West Virginia
- Tucker Devries − West Virginia

==== Women's ====
Games Televised on FloHoops, ESPN2 and ESPNU

5th Place Game; Monday, November 25
Columbia	69
Ball State	62
7th Place Game; Monday, November 25
Southern Miss	57
Texas A&M	79

Consolation 2nd Round; Sunday, November 24
Southern Miss	66
Columbia	85
Ball State	75
Texas A&M	62

First Round; Saturday, November 23
18	Baylor	101
Southern Miss	55
Indiana	72
Columbia	62
16	North Carolina	63
Ball State	52
Texas A&M	57
Villanova	65

Semifinals; Sunday, November 24
18	Baylor	65
Indiana	73
16	North Carolina	53
Villanova	36

Championship; Monday, November 25
Indiana	39
16	North Carolina	69
3rd Place Game; Monday, November 25
Baylor	73
Villanova	62

* – Denotes overtime period

=== 2023 ===
==== Men's ====
5th Place Game; Friday, November 24
Texas Tech	73
Michigan	57
7th Place Game; Friday, November 24
Northern Iowa	73
Stanford	51

Consolation 2nd Round; Thursday, November 23
Northern Iowa	70
Texas Tech	72
Michigan	83
Stanford	78

Quarterfinals
14	North Carolina	91
Northern Iowa	69
Villanova	85
Texas Tech	69
Michigan	67
Memphis	71
20	Arkansas	77**
Stanford	74

Semifinals
14	North Carolina	81
Villanova	83*
Memphis	84
20	Arkansas	79

Championship; Friday, November 24
Villanova	79
Memphis	63
3rd Place Game; Friday, November 24
14	North Carolina	87
20	Arkansas	72

* – Denotes overtime period

==== Women's ====
5th Place Game; Monday, November 20
Memphis	57
Middle Tennessee	64
7th Place Game; Monday, November 20
Howard	62
DePaul	85

Consolation 2nd Round; Sunday, November 19
Howard	43
Memphis	52
Middle Tennessee	71
DePaul	69

Quarterfinals
23	Ole Miss	67
Howard	54
Arizona	90
Memphis	67
Michigan	63
Middle Tennessee	49
DePaul	71
South Dakota	83

Semifinals
23	Ole Miss	56
Arizona	47
Michigan	70
South Dakota	52

Championship; Monday, November 20
24	Ole Miss	60
Michigan	49
3rd Place Game; Monday, November 20
Arizona	61
South Dakota	52

=== 2022 ===
==== Men's ====
5th Place Game; Friday, November 25
NC State	76
Butler	61
7th Place Game; Friday, November 25
Dayton	75
BYU	79*

Consolation 2nd Round; Thursday, November 24
NC State	76
Dayton	64
BYU	70
Butler	75

Quarterfinals
3	Kansas	80
NC State	74
Dayton	42
Wisconsin	43
USC	82
BYU	76
22	Tennessee	71
Butler	45

Semifinals
3	Kansas	69*
Wisconsin	68
USC	66
22	Tennessee	73*

Championship; Friday, November 25
3	Kansas	50
22	Tennessee	64
3rd Place Game; Friday, November 25
Wisconsin	64
USC	59

==== Women's ====
5th Place Game; Monday, November 21
South Dakota State	65
10	Louisville	55
7th Place Game; Monday, November 21
Rutgers	44
19	Texas	82

Consolation 2nd Round; Sunday, November 20
Rutgers	56
South Dakota State	75
6	Louisville	71
3	Texas	63

Quarterfinals
11	Tennessee	94
Rutgers	54
UCLA	72
South Dakota State	65
6	Louisville	67
Gonzaga	79
3	Texas	61
Marquette	68

Semifinals
11	Tennessee	63
UCLA	80
Gonzaga	66
Marquette	70

Championship; Monday, November 21
20	UCLA	66*
Marquette	58
3rd Place Game; Monday, November 21
23т	Tennessee	72
Gonzaga	73

=== 2021 ===
==== Men's ====
5th Place Game; Friday, November 26
19	Auburn	89
Syracuse	68
7th Place Game; Friday, November 26
Loyola	77
Arizona State	59

Consolation 2nd Round; Thursday, November 25
Loyola	53
19	Auburn	62
Syracuse	92
Arizona State	84

First Round; Wednesday, November 24
Michigan State	63
Loyola	61
19	Auburn	109
22	UConn	115**
Syracuse	55
VCU	67
6	Baylor	75
Arizona State	63

Semifinals; Thursday, November 25
Michigan State	64
22	UConn	60
VCU	61
6	Baylor	69

Championship; Friday, November 26
Michigan State	58
6	Baylor	75
3rd Place Game; Friday, November 26
22	UConn	70
VCU	63

==== Women's ====
5th Place Game; Monday, November 22
Minnesota	69
Oklahoma	88
7th Place Game
Syracuse	79
Buffalo	88

Consolation 2nd Round; Sunday, November 21
Minnesota	70
Syracuse	63
Oklahoma	93
Buffalo	72

First Round; Saturday, November 20
2	UConn	88
Minnesota	58
23	South Florida	77
Syracuse	53
9	Oregon	98
Oklahoma	93
1	South Carolina	88
Buffalo	60

Semifinals; Sunday, November 21
2	UConn	60
23	South Florida	53
9	Oregon	63
1	South Carolina	80

Championship; Monday, November 22
2	UConn	57
1	South Carolina	73
3rd Place Game
23	South Florida	71
9	Oregon	62

=== 2020 ===
2020 Battle 4 Atlantis was canceled due to the COVID-19 pandemic

==== Men's ====
- Duke
- Ohio State
- West Virginia
- Utah
- Texas A&M
- Wichita State
- Creighton
- Memphis

==== Women's ====
- Central Michigan
- Marquette
- Minnesota
- Oklahoma
- Oregon
- South Carolina
- South Florida
- Syracuse

=== 2019 ===
5th Place Game; November 29
Iowa State	76
13	Seton Hall	84
7th place game
Alabama	83
Southern Miss	68

Consolation 2nd Round; November 28
Iowa State	104
Alabama	89
Southern Miss	56
13	Seton Hall	81

First Round; November 27
Michigan	83
Iowa State	76
6	North Carolina	76
Alabama	67
8	Gonzaga	94
Southern Miss	69
13	Seton Hall	69
11	Oregon	71

Semifinals; November 28
Michigan	73
6	North Carolina	64
8	Gonzaga	73
11	Oregon	72

Championship; November 29
Michigan	82
8	Gonzaga	64
3rd Place Game
6	North Carolina	78
11	Oregon	74

=== 2018 ===
5th Place Game; November 23
Florida	54
Butler	61
7th place game
Stanford	67
Middle Tennessee	54

Consolation 2nd Round; November 22
Florida	72
Stanford	49
Butler	84
Middle Tennessee	53

First Round; November 21
Florida	60
Oklahoma	65
25	Wisconsin	62
Stanford	46
Butler	64
Dayton	69
4	Virginia	74
Middle Tennessee	52

Semifinals; November 22
Oklahoma	58
25	Wisconsin	78
Dayton	59
4	Virginia	66

Championship; November 23
25	Wisconsin	46
4	Virginia	53
3rd Place Game
Oklahoma	65
Dayton	54

=== 2017 ===
5th Place Game; November 24
Western Kentucky	63
SMU	61
7th place game
18	Purdue	89
2	Arizona	64

Consolation 2nd Round; November 23
18	Purdue	73
Western Kentucky	77
2	Arizona	60
SMU	66

First Round; November 22
18	Purdue	60
Tennessee	78*
5	Villanova	66
Western Kentucky	58
NC State	90
2	Arizona	84
SMU	58
Northern Iowa	61

Semifinals; November 23
Tennessee	60
5	Villanova	85
NC State	60
Northern Iowa	64

Championship; November 24
5	Villanova	64
Northern Iowa	50
3rd Place Game
Tennessee	67
NC State	58

==== Mainland Bracket ====
Mainland Bracket; November 23
Nicholls State	76
Presbyterian	64
Chicago State	73
UMBC	84

Mainland Championship game November 24
Nicholls State	88
UMBC	89
Mainland 3rd place game November 24
Presbyterian	75
Chicago State	73

=== 2016 ===
5th Place Game; November 25
VCU	85
LSU	74
7th place game
St. John's	55
Old Dominion	63

Consolation 2nd Round; November 24
St. John's	69
VCU	75
LSU	66
Old Dominion	60

First Round; November 23
24	Michigan State	73
St. John's	62
20	Baylor	71
VCU	63
Wichita State	82
LSU	47
10	Louisville	68*
Old Dominion	62

Semifinals; November 24
24	Michigan State	58
20	Baylor	73
Wichita State	52
10	Louisville	62

Championship; November 25
20	Baylor	66
10	Louisville	63
3rd Place Game
24	Michigan State	77
Wichita State	72

==== Mainland Games ====
Mainland Battle 4 Atlantis was unbracketed for 2016.

November 23
Florida Gulf Coast	69
Binghamton	53

November 24
Binghamton	72
Long Beach State	64

November 25
Florida Gulf Coast	68*
Long Beach State	67

=== 2015 ===
5th Place Game; November 27
Texas	72
Michigan	78
7th place game
Washington	71
Charlotte	66

Consolation 2nd Round; November 26
Texas	82
Washington	70
Michigan	102
Charlotte	47

First Round; November 25
10	Gonzaga	80
Washington	64
25	Texas A&M	82
Texas	73
Michigan	60
18	UConn	74
Charlotte	70
Syracuse	83

Semifinals; November 26
10	Gonzaga	61
25	Texas A&M	62
18	UConn	76
Syracuse	79

Championship; November 27
25	Texas A&M	67
Syracuse	74
3rd Place Game
10	Gonzaga	73
18	UConn	70

==== Mainland Bracket ====
Mainland Bracket; November 26
Texas A&M–Corpus Christi	73
Furman	69
Mount St. Mary's	74
Elon	79

Mainland Championship game November 27
Texas A&M-Corpus Christi	85
Elon	81
Mainland 3rd place game November 27
Furman	69
Mount St. Mary's	60

=== 2014 ===
5th Place Game; November 28
18	Florida	64
5	North Carolina	75
7th place game
UAB	76
22	UCLA	88

Consolation 2nd Round; November 27
UAB	46
18	Florida	57
22	UCLA	56
5	North Carolina	78

First Round; November 26
2	Wisconsin	72
UAB	43
18	Florida	65
Georgetown	66*
22	UCLA	65
Oklahoma	75
Butler	74
5	North Carolina	66

Semifinals; November 27
2	Wisconsin	68
Georgetown	65
Oklahoma	59
Butler	46

Championship; November 28
2	Wisconsin	69
Oklahoma	56
3rd Place Game
Georgetown	58
Butler	64

==== Mainland Bracket ====
Mainland Bracket; November 26
Coastal Carolina	61
Louisiana–Monroe	48
Robert Morris	46
Chattanooga	61

Mainland Championship game November 27
Coastal Carolina	67
Chattanooga	78
Mainland 3rd place game November 27
Robert Morris	71
Louisiana–Monroe	54

=== 2013 ===
5th Place Game; November 30
Wake Forest	63
Tennessee	82
7th place game
USC	84
Xavier	78

Consolation 2nd Round; November 29
Wake Forest	77
USC	63
Tennessee	64
Xavier	49

First Round; November 28
2	Kansas	87
Wake Forest	78
Villanova	93
USC	79
Tennessee	70
UTEP	78
Xavier	74
23	Iowa	77*

Semifinals; November 29
2	Kansas	59
Villanova	63
UTEP	53
23	Iowa	89

Championship; November 30
Villanova	88*
23	Iowa	83
3rd Place Game
2	Kansas	67
UTEP	63

=== 2012 ===
5th Place Game; November 24
Stanford	63
Minnesota	84
7th place game
19	Memphis	52
Northern Iowa	47

Consolation 2nd Round; November 23
Northern Iowa	50
Stanford	66
19	Memphis	75
Minnesota	84

First Round; November 22
2	Louisville	51
Northern Iowa	46
13	Missouri	78
Stanford	70
19	Memphis	65
VCU	78
5	Duke	89
Minnesota	71

Semifinals; November 23
2	Louisville	84
13	Missouri	61
VCU	58
5	Duke	67

Championship; November 24
2	Louisville	71
5	Duke	76
3rd Place Game
13	Missouri	68
VCU	65

==== Mainland Bracket ====
Mainland Bracket; November 21
Samford	69
Toledo	82
Florida Gulf Coast	50
Alcorn State	48

Mainland Championship game November 22
Toledo	66
Florida Gulf Coast	72
Mainland 3rd place game November 24
Samford	65
Alcorn State	69

=== 2011 ===
5th Place Game; November 26
College of Charleston	85
UMass	61
7th place game
UNC Asheville	87
Utah	65

Consolation 2nd Round; November 25
UNC Asheville	66
College of Charleston	68
Utah	75
UMass	89

First Round; November 24
4	Connecticut	73
UNC Asheville	63
UCF	74
College of Charleston	63
Utah	47
Harvard	75
22	Florida State	73
UMass	53

Semifinals; November 25
4	Connecticut	63
UCF	68
Harvard	46
22	Florida State	41

Championship; November 26
UCF	49
Harvard	59
3rd Place Game
4	Connecticut	78*
22	Florida State	76

== Future Fields ==
=== 2026 ===
==== Bracket 1 ====
- Memphis
- Mississippi State
- Penn State
- Wake Forest

==== Bracket 2 ====
- Marquette
- Texas A&M
- Virginia
- Xavier
