= 2011–12 Harvard Crimson men's basketball team =

American college basketball season

2011–12 Harvard Crimson men's basketball

Ivy League Champion 2011 Battle 4 Atlantis Champion

NCAA tournament, Round of 64
- Conference: Ivy League
- Record: 26–5 (12–2 Ivy League)
- Head coach: Tommy Amaker
- Assistant coaches: Brian Adams; Brian DeStefano; Yanni Hufnagel
- Captains: Oliver McNally; Keith Wright
- Home arena: Lavietes Pavilion

2011–12 Ivy League men's basketball standings
	Conf.				Overall
Team	W		L	PCT	W		L	PCT
Harvard	12	–	2	.857	26	–	5	.839
Penn	11	–	3	.786	20	–	13	.606
Princeton	10	–	4	.714	20	–	12	.625
Yale	9	–	5	.643	19	–	10	.655
Cornell	7	–	7	.500	12	–	16	.429
Columbia	4	–	10	.286	15	–	15	.500
Brown	2	–	12	.143	8	–	23	.258
Dartmouth	1	–	13	.071	5	–	25	.167
As of March 15, 2012; Rankings from AP Poll

The 2011–12 Harvard Crimson men's basketball team represented Harvard University in the Ivy League athletic conference during the 2011–12 NCAA Division I men's basketball season. The team played its home games in Boston, Massachusetts at the Lavietes Pavilion, located across the Charles River from the university's main campus in Cambridge with a capacity of 2,195. The team was led by fifth-year head coach Tommy Amaker and senior co-captains Keith Wright and Oliver McNally.

Harvard began the season 8–0, the best start by an Ivy League team since Columbia won its first ten games to begin the 1969-70 season. On December 5, 2011, Harvard made its first-ever appearances in the AP Poll and the Coaches' Poll, ranking 25th and 24th, respectively. The season included two wins against teams in the powerhouse Atlantic Coast Conference (ACC).

Harvard set a school record with 26 wins during the season and tied a school record for conference wins with 12. Its 14 non-conference wins also tied an Ivy League record previously held by the 2009-10 Cornell Big Red. The season culminated in an invitation to the 2012 NCAA Division I men's basketball tournament, where Harvard lost in the second round. It was Harvard's first NCAA tournament appearance since 1946 and third consecutive appearance in a postseason tournament. Junior Kyle Casey was a first-team All-Ivy selection, while junior Brandyn Curry and senior Keith Wright earned second-team recognition.

== Preseason ==
Harvard came into the 2011–12 season off of its first Ivy League championship and two school record-setting years in terms of total wins. The 2010–11 team that won the league championship during the 2010–11 Ivy League men's basketball season had no seniors. Ivy League Men's Basketball Player of the Year Keith Wright returned to the team as a senior, as did All-Ivy League juniors Kyle Casey, Brandyn Curry and Christian Webster. Harvard entered the season with a 17-game home winning streak, the 10th-longest in the country. Senior co-captain Oliver McNally entered the season with a 32-shot free throw streak, having finished second in the nation in free throw percentage the previous year.

The upperclassmen on the team came from the first top-25 recruiting class in Ivy League history. Harvard and Wright won numerous preseason honors. Wright was a preseason John R. Wooden Award Top 50 Watchlist honoree as well as a Lou Henson Preseason All-America team selection. Harvard was selected as the conference preseason favorite for the first time in school history. In addition, Harvard received preseason votes in the AP Poll, marking the fourth straight season it received votes at some point in the year.

The team's schedule included power conference opponents Boston College (ACC), Utah (Pac-12) and Connecticut (Big East) as well as a possible second-round Battle 4 Atlantis match against Florida State (ACC). Expectations were high for Harvard, and a December 8 contest against Connecticut was the only Ivy League game scheduled for broadcast on ESPN2 during the season.

== Schedule ==
Date time, TV	Rank^{#}	Opponent^{#}	Result	Record	Site (attendance) city, state
Regular season
November 11, 2011*; 7:00 pm, Harvard Athletics		MIT	W 76–49	1–0	Lavietes Pavilion (2,195); Boston, MA
November 15, 2011*; 7:00 pm		at Holy Cross	W 73–64	2–0	Hart Center (1,892); Worcester, MA
November 19, 2011*; 9:30 pm		at Loyola Marymount	W 77–67	3–0	Gersten Pavilion (3,313); Los Angeles, CA
November 24, 2011*; 9:30 pm, HDNet		vs. Utah; Battle 4 Atlantis First Round	W 75–47	4–0	Atlantis Resort (2,530); Nassau, Bahamas
November 25, 2011*; 4:30 pm, Versus		No. 22 Florida State; Battle 4 Atlantis Semi-Final	W 46–41	5–0	Atlantis Resort (2,394); Nassau, Bahamas
November 26, 2011*; 4:30 pm, Versus		vs. UCF; Battle 4 Atlantis Finals	W 59–49	6–0	Atlantis Resort (2,752); Nassau, Bahamas
December 1, 2011*; 7:00 pm		at Vermont	W 55–48	7–0	Patrick Gym (2,827); Burlington, VT
December 4, 2011*; 2:00 pm, Harvard Athletics		Seattle	W 80–70	8–0	Lavietes Pavilion (1,896); Boston, MA
December 8, 2011*; 7:00 pm, ESPN2	No. 25	at No. 9 Connecticut	L 53–67	8–1	Harry A. Gampel Pavilion (10,167); Storrs, CT
December 10, 2011*; 4:00 pm, NESN	No. 25	at Boston University	W 76–52	9–1	Case Gym (3,010); Boston, MA
December 22, 2011*; 7:00 pm, Harvard Athletics		Florida Atlantic	W 63–51	10–1	Lavietes Pavilion (1,973); Boston, MA
December 29, 2011*; 7:00 pm, ESPN3	No. 24	at Boston College	W 67–46	11–1	Silvio O. Conte Forum (8,606); Chestnut Hill, MA
December 31, 2011*; 4:00 pm, Harvard Athletics	No. 24	Saint Joseph's	W 74–69	12–1	Lavietes Paviilion (2,195); Boston, MA
January 3, 2012*; 7:00 pm, CBS ULive	No. 22	at Fordham	L 54–60	12–2	Rose Hill Gym (2,891); Bronx, NY
January 7, 2012; 2:00 pm, Harvard Athletics	No. 22	Dartmouth	W 63–47	13–2 (1–0)	Lavietes Pavilion (2,195); Boston, MA
January 10, 2012*; 7:00 pm		at Monmouth	W 70–61	14–2	Multipurpose Activity Center (1,809); West Long Branch, NJ
January 14, 2012*; 2:00 pm, Harvard Athletics		George Washington	W 69–48	15–2	Lavietes Pavilion (2,195); Boston, MA
January 21, 2012; 7:00 pm		at Dartmouth	W 54–38	16–2 (2–0)	Leede Arena (2,100); Hanover, NH
January 27, 2012; 7:00 pm		at Yale	W 65–35	17–2 (3–0)	Payne Whitney Gymnasium (2,522); New Haven, CT
January 28, 2012; 6:00 pm		at Brown	W 68–59	18–2 (4–0)	Pizzitola Sports Center (2,005); Providence, RI
February 3, 2012; 7:00 pm, Harvard Athletics		Cornell	W 71–60	19–2 (5–0)	Lavietes Pavilion (2,195); Boston, MA
February 4, 2012; 7:00 pm, Harvard Athletics		Columbia	W 57–52	20–2 (6–0)	Lavietes Pavilion (2,195); Boston, MA
February 10, 2012; 7:00 pm	No. 25	at Penn	W 56–50	21–2 (7–0)	Palestra (7,462); Philadelphia, PA
February 11, 2012; 7:00 pm, ESPNU	No. 25	at Princeton	L 62–70	21–3 (7–1)	Jadwin Gymnasium (5,266); Princeton, NJ
February 17, 2012; 7:00 pm, Harvard Athletics		Brown	W 69–42	22–3 (8–1)	Lavietes Pavilion (2,195); Boston, MA
February 18, 2012; 7:00 pm, Harvard Athletics		Yale	W 66–51	23–3 (9–1)	Lavietes Pavilion (2,195); Boston, MA
February 24, 2012; 7:00 pm, Harvard Athletics		Princeton	W 67–64	24–3 (10–1)	Lavietes Pavilion (2,195); Boston, MA
February 25, 2012; 7:00 pm, Harvard Athletics		Penn	L 54–55	24–4 (10–2)	Lavietes Pavilion (2,195); Boston, MA
March 2, 2012; 7:00 pm		at Columbia	W 77–70 ^{OT}	25–4 (11–2)	Levien Gymnasium (2,702); New York, NY
March 3, 2012; 7:00 pm, ESPN3		at Cornell	W 67–63	26–4 (12–2)	Newman Arena (4,027); Ithaca, NY
2012 NCAA Tournament
Mar. 15, 2012*; 4:45 p.m., TNT	(12 E)	vs. (5 E) No. 20 Vanderbilt; East Regional Second round	L 70–79	26–5	The Pit (10,774); Albuquerque, New Mexico
*Non-conference game. ^{#}Rankings from AP Poll. (#) Tournament seedings in parentheses. All times are in Eastern Time.

== Rankings ==
On December 5, 2011, Harvard made its first-ever appearance in either the AP (25th) or Coaches' Poll (24th). That left Brown as the only Ivy League school never to have been ranked in the AP Poll and left only seven Division I schools active since the poll began that have never been ranked in it. Harvard was the first Ivy League team ranked in the Coaches' Poll since the 2009–10 Cornell Big Red and the first Ivy League team ranked in the AP Poll since the 1997–98 Princeton Tigers. By January 2, the team achieved rankings of 22nd in the AP Poll and 21st in the Coaches' Poll. On February 6, the team again attained the ranking of 21st in the Coaches' Poll.

Ranking movements Legend: ██ Increase in ranking ██ Decrease in ranking RV = Received votes
	Week																			
Poll	Pre	1	2	3	4	5	6	7	8	9	10	11	12	13	14	15	16	17	18	Final
AP Poll	RV	RV	RV	RV	25	RV	RV	24	22	RV	RV	RV	RV	25	RV	RV	RV	RV	RV	
Coaches Poll			RV	RV	24	RV	25	23	21	25	24	23	23	21	RV	RV	RV	RV	RV	

== Season ==
Harvard's season began with a Crimson Madness event on October 15 where the team raised a 2010–11 Ivy League Championship banner and held an intrasquad scrimmage. The team opened the season with a victory over MIT on November 11 that extended Harvard's win streak against MIT to nine games.

Following the victory over MIT, Harvard took part in the 2011 Battle 4 Atlantis Tournament. The team beat Utah 75–47 in the first game of the tournament, its first-ever win against a Pac-12 Conference opponent. On November 25, Harvard faced Florida State, which was then ranked 22nd in the AP poll and 20th in the Coaches' Poll. Harvard won that game 46–41 for the second-ever defeat of a ranked opponent in team history. Harvard then matched up against UCF in the tournament final, winning 59–49. Wright earned Ivy League player of the week for his performance in the Battle 4 Atlantis tournament. McNally extended his free-throw streak to 51 in the Florida State victory, but his run ended in the final minutes of the UCF game.

The 2008–09 team had previously defeated then-ranked Boston College (17th in the AP Poll and 24th in the Coaches' Poll) for the first win over a ranked team in the program's history, but lost to all ranked opponents in the 2009–10 and 2010–11 seasons. The win against Boston College was the 1000th in school history. The Florida State victory was the school's second over a ranked team in its history and the highest-ranked opponent in the Coaches' Poll that Harvard has ever defeated. Florida State went on to win the 2012 ACC men's basketball tournament.

Harvard began the season 8–0, the best start by an Ivy League team since Columbia won its first ten games to begin the 1969-70 season. Harvard, then ranked 25th in the AP poll and 24th in the Coaches' poll, next faced its most formidable challenge yet: Connecticut, which then had a 7–1 record and was ranked 9th in both polls. Harvard had the better record against common foes, Florida State and UCF (2–0 versus 1–1). Connecticut won the teams' previous meeting at Harry A. Gampel Pavilion in 2009 by a score of 79–73 as the 2009-10 Huskies (then ranked 14th in the AP Poll and 13th in the Coaches' Poll) survived a 30-point, 9-rebound effort by Jeremy Lin. Harvard lost the 2011 meeting 67–53.

Harvard won its next four games, including victories over Boston University and Boston College for a season sweep of city rivals after beating MIT in November. Harvard's victory over Boston College was its fourth in a row against the Atlantic Coast Conference team, giving it five consecutive wins overall against ACC teams, including its only two wins against ranked opponents. After rising to 21st in the Coaches' Poll and 22nd in the AP Poll, Fordham upset Harvard 60–54 in January. A 65–35 win over Yale three weeks later was Harvard's widest margin of victory against its Ivy League rival in 183 meetings. Harvard lost its third Ivy League game of the season, falling to Princeton on February 11, but avenged the loss in a home win on February 24. That victory gave Harvard a new school record for single-season wins as well as single-season non-league wins and tied the record for conference game wins. A day after beating Princeton, however, Harvard lost to Penn, snapping a 28-game home winning streak dating to February 20, 2010. Nonetheless, Harvard finished the season with a 26–4 overall record. The team won Ivy League regular-season title and earned its first invitation to the NCAA tournament since 1946. Harvard entered the tournament with a 2–1 record against teams in the field and was seeded 12th in the East Region. Harvard lost in the second round of the tournament to fifth-seeded Vanderbilt on March 15 by a score of 79–70.

Harvard set a school record by selling out 10 of 12 home games at Lavietes Pavilion (the sellouts came in all seven Ivy League matchups, as well as versus MIT, Saint Joseph's, and George Washington). All five of Harvard's starters and 12 total players returned from the previous year's championship team, but freshmen accounted for over 22% of minutes played in the 2011–12 season. By sweeping its four games against Massachusetts rivals, Harvard extended an in-state winning streak to 14 games. The program also defeated teams from a record-setting 11 conferences, plus an independent. Other school records set during the season included best Ivy League start and most road wins, with 12. Harvard's 14 non-conference wins in the regular season tied an Ivy-League record.

== Honors ==
=== In-season ===
Each week the Ivy League selected a player of the week and a rookie of the week.

	Player of the Week			Rookie of the Week	
	Name	Class	Position	Name	Position
November 28, 2011	Keith Wright	Sr.	F		
December 5, 2011				Jonah Travis	F
December 12, 2011	Kyle Casey	Jr.	F		
January 16, 2012	Keith Wright	Sr.	F		
January 23, 2012				Corbin Miller	G
January 30, 2012				Steve Moundou-Missi	F
March 5, 2012	Kyle Casey	Jr.	F		

=== Postseason honors ===
Kyle Casey and Keith Wright were selected by the U.S. Basketball Writers Association to its 10-man All-District I (ME, VT, NH, RI, MA, CT) team, while Tommy Amaker was named the All-District I Coach of the Year. The National Association of Basketball Coaches announced its Division I All-District 13 team on March 14, recognizing the nation's best men's collegiate basketball student-athletes. Keith Wright was a first-team selection, while Kyle Casey was a second-team selection. Wright was also selected to participate in the NABC 2012 Reese's Division I All-Star Game at the 2012 NCAA Tournament final four.

The following players earned Ivy League postseason recognition:

First Team All-Ivy

- Kyle Casey, (Jr., F, Medway, Mass.)

Second Team All-Ivy

- Brandyn Curry, (Jr., G, Huntersville, N.C.)
- Keith Wright, (Sr., F, Suffolk, Va.)
