= Zack Rosen =

American basketball player (born 1989)

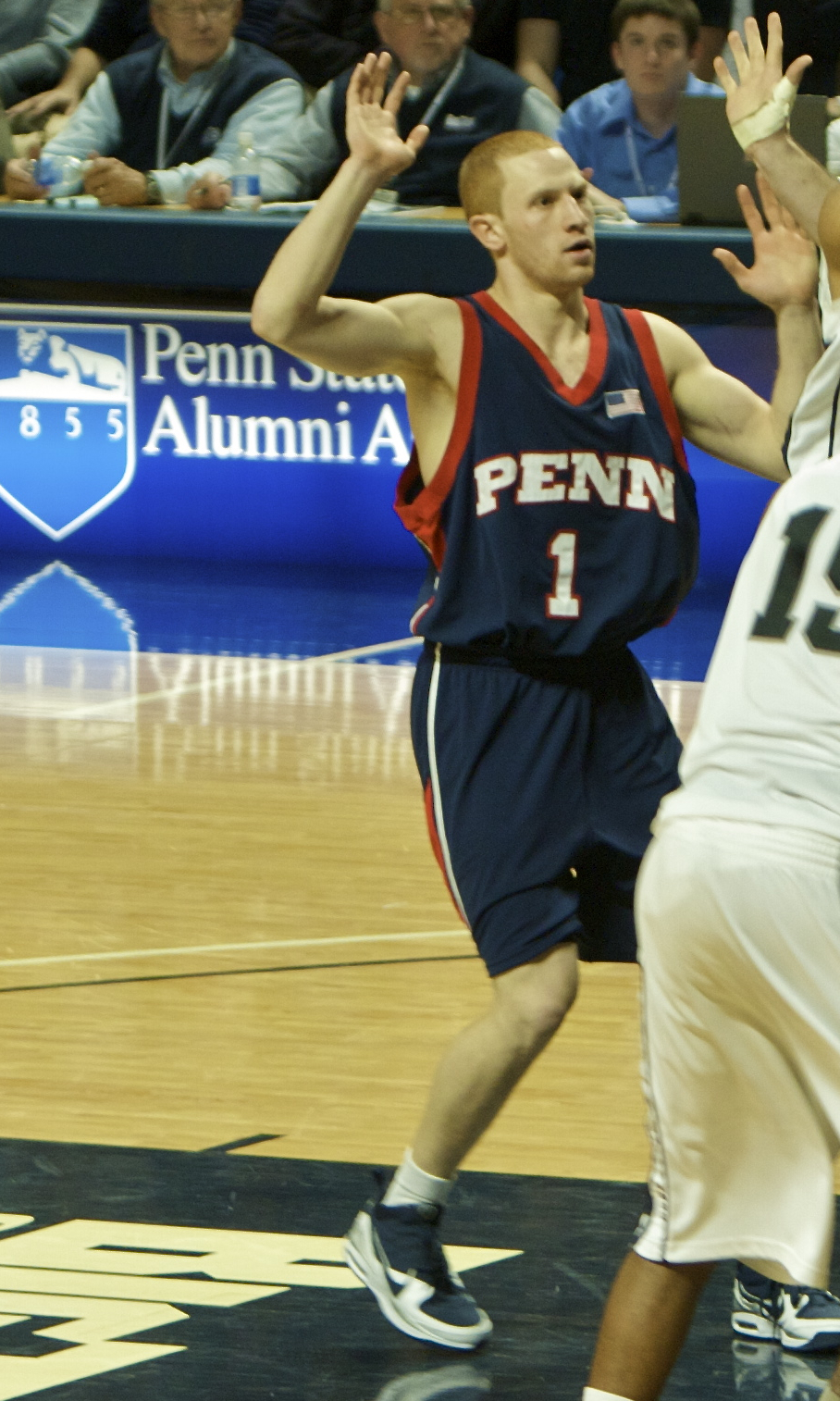

Personal information
- Born: March 14, 1989 (age 37) Colonia, New Jersey, U.S.
- Listed height: 6 ft 1 in (1.85 m)
- Listed weight: 170 lb (77 kg)

Career information
- High school: Saint Benedict's (Newark, New Jersey); Colonia (Woodbridge Township, New Jersey)
- College: Penn (2008–2012)
- NBA draft: 2012: undrafted
- Playing career: 2012–2015
- Position: Point guard
- Number: 21

Career history
- 2012–2013: Hapoel Holon
- 2013: Hapoel Jerusalem B.C.
- 2013–2015: Maccabi Ashdod B.C.

Career highlights
- Ivy League Player of the Year (2012); 3× First-team All-Ivy (2010–2012); AP Honorable mention All-American (2012); Robert V. Geasey Trophy winner (2012)

Zack Rosen (born March 14, 1989) is an American former basketball player. Rosen, a point guard, played collegiately at the University of Pennsylvania, where he was an All-American and Ivy League player of the year.

== College career ==
Rosen is Jewish, from the Colonia section of Woodbridge Township, New Jersey, and played for the Penn Quakers men's basketball team from 2008 to 2012. As a freshman, he immediately moved into the starting lineup, averaging 8.5 points and 5.0 assists per game. At the close of the season, he was named Philadelphia Big 5 rookie of the year. From there, Rosen became a fixture on the All-Ivy team – earning first team honors as a sophomore, junior and senior.

As a senior, Rosen led Penn back to the postseason for the first time in his career, as the Quakers finished the season 20–13 and made it to the second round of the 2012 College Basketball Invitational. Rosen led the Ivy in scoring at 18.2 points per game and finished third in assists (5.1 per game). He was unanimously named the 2012 Ivy League player of the year. Nationally, Rosen was a semi-finalist for the Bob Cousy Award and a finalist for the Lowe's Senior CLASS award. Rosen was also named an honorable mention All-American by the Associated Press.

The first three-time captain in program history, Rosen graduated as the Penn men's basketball program's all-time leader in assists (588), games started (115) and minutes played (4,198), and his point total (1,723) is third behind only Ernie Beck and Ugonna Onyekwe. In his final season, Rosen set program single-season marks for assists (173), starts (33) and minutes played (1,259), while his point total (602) was the best since Tony Price scored 633 points in 1978–79. Rosen also hit 75 three-point field goals in 2011–12, the seventh-best single-season total in program history.

In addition to leading Penn in scoring, assists, three-pointers and free throws made (105), Rosen was second on the team with 46 steals. He scored in double figures a team-high 31 times in 33 games—including 17 in a row to end the season—and had 13 games with 20 or more points including six with 25 or more. Rosen had three double-doubles, all coming via a points-assists combination.

On May 12, 2012, The University of Pennsylvania gave out its Senior Class Leadership Awards at College Hall as part of the weekend's Commencement ceremonies. At the ceremony, Zack Rosen, was presented with the Spoon Award and the Class of 1915 Award by University President Amy Gutmann.

== Maccabiah Games ==
Rosen won a gold medal with the US basketball team at the 2009 Maccabiah Games.

== Professional career ==
On August 2, 2012, Rosen signed his first professional contract with Hapoel Holon of the Israeli Basketball Super League. On August 28, 2013, Rosen signed a 2-year contract with his second professional team Hapoel Jerusalem B.C.

On November 28, 2013, Rosen signed a 1-year contract with his third professional team Maccabi Ashdod B.C. of the Israeli Basketball Super League. On July 13, 2014, Rosen re-signed with Maccabi Ashdod B.C. Rosen sustained a back injury during the 2014/15 season and was released by Ashdod during the off-season. Rosen won the 3-point shootout in the Super League All Star Game in 2014 and 2015.

== See also ==
- List of select Jewish basketball players
