= Greg Mangano =

Free agent
- Position: Center / power forward

Personal information
- Born: October 28, 1989 (age 36) Orange, Connecticut, U.S.
- Listed height: 6 ft 10 in (2.08 m)
- Listed weight: 240 lb (109 kg)

Career information
- High school: Notre-Dame West Haven (West Haven, Connecticut)
- College: Yale (2008–2012)
- NBA draft: 2012: undrafted
- Playing career: 2012–2022

Career history
- 2012: Antalya
- 2012–2013: Força Lleida
- 2013–2014: ratiopharm Ulm
- 2014–2015: Kauhajoen Karhu
- 2015–2016: Kangoeroes Basket Willebroek
- 2016-2017: Al Nassr Riyadh
- 2017: Sendai 89ers
- 2017–2018: Kauhajoen Karhu
- 2018–2019: Kyiv-Basket
- 2019–2020: Bambitious Nara
- 2020–2021: KTP Basket
- 2021–2022: Club Atlético Peñarol

Career highlights
- Korisliiga champion (2018); 2× First-team All-Ivy League (2011, 2012)

Greg Mangano (born October 28, 1989) is an American basketball player for KTP Basket of Korisliiga. He played college basketball for the Yale Bulldogs. He is known for versatility as a frontcourt player and his polished face up game offensively.

== High school ==
Mangano attended Notre-Dame West Haven, where he was a two-time all-state player and a two-time all-league selection. His senior year was his best year, as he averaged 26 points, 15 rebounds, and 6 blocks per game. These numbers were good enough to get him MVP honors and a nomination for the McDonald's All-American Game. Rivals.com ranked Mahimgnano as a 2-star prospect.

== College ==
=== Freshman year ===
Mangano received the John C. Cobb Award for the best freshman player on the Yale team as the Bulldogs went 13–15. He received little playing time, averaging just 6.5 minutes per game, although he did manage to score 2.1 points per game.

=== Sophomore year ===
Mangano was given a bigger role in his sophomore year. He hit the weight room hard over the summer following his freshman year. His playing time tripled, and he led the Ivy League in blocks with 2 per game. He also added 7.5 points and 5.5 rebounds per game. Despite his success, Yale struggled, going 12–19.

=== Junior year ===
Mangano had a breakout season his junior year, averaging a double-double for the Bulldogs with 16.3 points per game and 10 rebounds per game, along with 3 blocks per game. His 85 blocks were a Yale record, and the third-highest total in Ivy League history. As well as finishing second in scoring, Mangano led the Ivy League in blocks and rebounding; his totals were good for 9th and 24th in the nation respectively. His play was good enough to warrant selection to the All-Ivy first team and the National Association of Basketball Coaches All-district first team. Mangano declared for the 2011 NBA draft, but withdrew his name before the deadline. Yale had some success, finishing the year with a 15–13 record.

=== Senior year ===
Mangano came into his senior year considered a strong contender for Ivy League Player of the Year. The Bulldogs had early success and impressed in many of their games against stronger opposition. Mangano was particularly impressive against the then-10th ranked Florida Gators, scoring 26 points, grabbing 12 rebounds, blocking two shots, and making 4 of the 6 three-pointers that he attempted. The Bulldogs had an outside chance to claim the Ivy League title entering their final 3 games, but losses to Princeton and Penn prevented the Bulldogs from claiming the title. The loss to the Penn Quakers was likely due to Mangano being the target of heckling by the Penn Band. Mangano's statistical numbers were very similar to those in his junior year. He led the Ivy League in rebounds and blocks, averaging 9.7 and 2.2 per game respectively. He was also sixth in the Ivy League in scoring with 18.2 points per game. He was named to the All-Ivy First Team. In terms of team success, Mangano's senior year was his best at Yale, as the Bulldogs went 19-10 and qualified for the CollegeInsider.com Tournament, where the team lost in the first round to the Rakim Sanders-led Fairfield Stags 68–56. Mangano had 17 points and 8 rebounds.

Mangano helped bring Yale back to relevance in the Ivy League after years at the bottom of the league. He finished his career with 213 blocks, which is most in Yale history- more than former NBA player Chris Dudley- and the third most in Ivy League history. Mangano was also sixth in school history in rebounds and 13th in points.

== Professional career ==
Mangano was honored as one of the nation's best seniors when he was selected to participate in the prestigious Portsmouth Invitational Tournament. His best game was his second; he scored 13 points on 5–11 shooting, including 3 of 5 from three, and grabbed 9 boards. he started and played 26 minutes. Mangano averaged 10.7 points, 6 rebounds, and 1 block per game while shooting 46.2 percent from three-point range, which was the sixth best percentage in the tournament. Despite working out with many teams, Mangano went undrafted in the 2012 NBA draft, although according to his agent Mangano would have been picked if he had been European. Mangano said that this shows that, "the NBA still doesn't respect the level of play in the Ivy League."

After going undrafted, Mangano signed with Antalya BB in the Turkish Basketball League On 29 December 2012, he left Turkey to join Força Lleida in the LEB Oro, Spain's second division. In 2013, Mangano signed with ratiopharm Ulm in Germany.

On August 12, 2018, Mangano signed with the Ukrainian team Kyiv-Basket. He chose the jersey number 44. He spent the 2019-20 season with Bambitious Nara of B.League, averaging 21.6 points and 15.1 rebounds per game. On August 29, 2020, Mangano signed with KTP Basket of Korisliiga.

== USA Basketball ==
Mangano's play led him to try out for the USA World University Games Team in 2008. He made the team, and appeared in 6 of the team's 8 games. He averaged 3.2 points and 3.2 rebounds per game, while averaging 11.3 minutes per game. He was second on the team with 5 blocks. The US went 7–1, good for 5th place.
