= 2011–12 Pittsburgh Panthers men's basketball team =

American college basketball season

2011–12 Pittsburgh Panthers men's basketball

College Basketball Invitational Champions Philly Hoop Group Classic Champions

CBI Champions
- Conference: Big East Conference (1979–2013)
- Record: 22–17 (5–13 Big East)
- Head coach: Jamie Dixon (9th season)
- Assistant coaches: Pat Sandle (11th season); Brandin Knight (4th season); Bill Barton (1st season)
- Home arena: Petersen Events Center (Capacity: 12,508)

2011–12 Big East men's basketball standings
	Conf.				Overall
Team	W		L	PCT	W		L	PCT
No. 11 Marquette	14	–	4	.778	27	–	8	.771
Notre Dame	13	–	5	.722	22	–	12	.647
Cincinnati	12	–	6	.667	26	–	11	.703
No. 15 Georgetown	12	–	6	.667	24	–	9	.727
South Florida	12	–	6	.667	22	–	14	.611
West Virginia	9	–	9	.500	19	–	14	.576
Connecticut	8	–	10	.444	20	–	14	.588
Seton Hall	8	–	10	.444	21	–	13	.618
Rutgers	6	–	12	.333	14	–	18	.438
St. John's	6	–	12	.333	13	–	19	.406
Pittsburgh	5	–	13	.278	22	–	17	.564
Villanova	5	–	13	.278	13	–	19	.406
Providence	4	–	14	.222	15	–	17	.469
DePaul	3	–	15	.167	12	–	19	.387
*No. 2 Syracuse	0	–	1	.000	0	–	3	.000
**No. 17 Louisville†	0	–	8	.000	0	–	10	.000
† 2012 Big East tournament winner As of March 31, 2012; *Syracuse: 30 reg. season games, 4 postseason games vacated due to sanctions against the program; Disputed record: Syracuse–(34–3)(17–1) **Louisville: 25 reg. season games, 5 postseason games vacated due to sanctions against the program; Disputed record: Louisville–(30-10)(10-8); Rankings from AP Poll

The 2011–12 Pittsburgh Panthers men's basketball team represented the University of Pittsburgh in the 2011–12 NCAA Division I men's basketball season. Their head coach was Jamie Dixon, who was in his ninth year as head coach at Pittsburgh and 13th overall at the university. The team played its home games in the Petersen Events Center in Pittsburgh, Pennsylvania and are members of the Big East Conference. Pitt entered the 2011–12 season picked to finish fourth in the Big East Conference, ranked #11 in the pre-season ESPN/USA Today Coaches Poll, and with the Big East pre-season player of the year, Ashton Gibbs. They finished the season 22–17, 5–13 in Big East play for a disappointing 13th-place finish. They lost in the second round of the Big East Basketball tournament to Georgetown. They were invited to the 2012 College Basketball Invitational where they advanced to the best of three game finals series against Washington State. They defeated the Cougars 2 games to 1 to be the 2012 CBI Champions.

== Outlook ==
The Pittsburgh Panthers finished the 2010–11 season as Big East Regular Season champions with 28–6, 15–3. They received a number 1 seed in the 2011 NCAA Division I men's basketball tournament, but were upset by eventual national runner-up Butler in the third round. Finishing at No. 12 in the final Coaches' Poll, Pitt returns two starters, including 2011–12 Big East Pre-season Player of the Year, Ashton Gibbs, as well as two of its top four scores, 41% of its scoring, and 45% of its rebounding. Four freshman joined the team, including McDonald's High School All-American Khem Birch.

At the Big East Conference media day on October 19, 2011, Pitt was selected by a vote of the league's coaches to finish fourth in the Big East Conference receiving one first place votes. Pitt guard Ashton Gibbs received preseason Player of the Year and first-team all-conference selections. The Panthers are ranked 11th in the nation in the preseason USA Today Coaches' Poll.

== Coaching staff ==
Name	Position	Year at Pittsburgh	Alma Mater (Year)
Jamie Dixon	Head coach	13th (9th as Head Coach)	TCU (1987)
Pat Sandle	Assistant coach	11th	San Francisco State (1987)
Brandin Knight	Assistant coach	6th	University of Pittsburgh (2005)
Bill Barton	Assistant coach	1st	Salem State (1989)
Brian Regan	Director of Basketball Operations	5th	Saint Vincent (1988)
Jordan Marks	Video Coordinator	3rd	University of Pittsburgh (2008)
Jason Richards	Graduate Manager	2nd	Davidson (2008)
Tony Salesi	Athletic Trainer	26th	University of Pittsburgh (1980)

== Recruiting ==
2011 Pitt Recruiting Class Signees.

College recruiting
Name	Hometown	School	Height	Weight	Commit date
Khem Birch forward	Dollard-des-Ormeaux, Quebec	Notre Dame Prep	6 ft 8 in (2.03 m)	210 lb (95 kg)	Sep 30, 2010
Khem Birch forward	Recruit ratings: Scout: Rivals: (97)				
Malcolm Gilbert center	Smyrna, Delaware	Academy of the New Church	6 ft 11 in (2.11 m)	220 lb (100 kg)	Aug 23, 2010
Malcolm Gilbert center	Recruit ratings: Scout: Rivals: (95)				
Durand Johnson shooting guard/small forward	Baltimore, Maryland	Brewster Academy	6 ft 6 in (1.98 m)	190.5 lb (86.4 kg)	Aug 16, 2010
Durand Johnson shooting guard/small forward	Recruit ratings: Scout: Rivals: (92)				
John Johnson point guard/shooting guard	Philadelphia, Pennsylvania	Girard College	6 ft 1 in (1.85 m)	166.5 lb (75.5 kg)	Sep 17, 2009
John Johnson point guard/shooting guard	Recruit ratings: Scout: Rivals: (91)				
Overall recruit ranking: Scout: 12 Rivals: 20 ESPN: 15
Note: In many cases, Scout, Rivals, 247Sports, On3, and ESPN may conflict in their listings of height and weight.; In these cases, the average was taken. ESPN grades are on a 100-point scale.; Sources: "Pittsburgh Basketball Commit List: 2011". Rivals.; "Pittsburgh College Basketball Recruiting Commits". Scout.; "College Basketball Recruiting Schools: Pittsburgh Panthers 2011". ESPN.; "Scout.com Team Recruiting Rankings". Scout.; "2011 Team Ranking". Rivals.

== Roster ==
2011–12 Pitt Panthers basketball roster

2011–12 Pittsburgh Panthers men's basketball team
Players
Coaches

Pos.	#	Name	Height	Weight	Year	Previous school	Hometown
G	2	Isaiah Epps (redshirt)	6 ft 2 in (1.88 m)	185 lb (84 kg)	Fr	Hargrave Military Academy/Plainfield HS	Plainfield
G	12	Ashton Gibbs	6 ft 2 in (1.88 m)	190 lb (86 kg)	Sr	Seton Hall Prep	Scotch Plains, New Jersey
C	33	Malcolm Gilbert	6 ft 11 in (2.11 m)	235 lb (107 kg)	Fr	Academy of the New Church	Smyrna, Delaware
G/F	5	Durand Johnson	6 ft 6 in (1.98 m)	190 lb (86 kg)	Fr	Brewster Academy/Lake Clifton	Baltimore
G	4	John Johnson	6 ft 1 in (1.85 m)	175 lb (79 kg)	Fr	Girard College	Philadelphia
F	44	J. J. Moore	6 ft 6 in (1.98 m)	205 lb (93 kg)	So	South Kent School/Brentwood HS	Brentwood, New York
C	15	Aron Nwankwo	6 ft 7 in (2.01 m)	205 lb (93 kg)	So	Baltimore City College	Baltimore
G/F	21	Lamar Patterson (redshirt)	6 ft 5 in (1.96 m)	229 lb (104 kg)	So	St. Benedict's Prep/J.P. McCaskey H.S.	Lancaster, Pennsylvania
G	14	Nick Rivers	6 ft 0 in (1.83 m)	180 lb (82 kg)	Sr	Brophy College Prep	Phoenix, Arizona
F	35	Nasir Robinson	6 ft 5 in (1.96 m)	225 lb (102 kg)	Sr	Chester HS	Chester, Pennsylvania
F	11	Dante Taylor	6 ft 9 in (2.06 m)	240 lb (109 kg)	Jr	National Christian Academy (MD)	Greenburgh, New York
G	1	Travon Woodall (redshirt)	5 ft 11 in (1.8 m)	195 lb (88 kg)	Jr	St. Anthony HS	Brooklyn, New York –Paterson, New Jersey
G	3	Cameron Wright (redshirt)	6 ft 4 in (1.93 m)	205 lb (93 kg)	Fr	Benedictine HS	Cleveland
F	42	Talib Zanna (redshirt)	6 ft 9 in (2.06 m)	230 lb (104 kg)	So	Bishop McNamara HS (MD)	Kaduna, Nigeria

Head coach

- Jamie Dixon (TCU )

Assistant coach(es)

- Pat Sandle (San Francisco State)
- Brandin Knight (Pittsburgh)
- Bill Barton (Salem State)

Legend

- (C) Team captain
- (S) Suspended
- (I) Ineligible
- (W) Walk-on
- Injured
- Current redshirt

Roster

- Note: Freshman Khem Birch (#24, 6 ft 9 in, 220 lb), at the time Pitt's starting center, left the team on December 16.

== Schedule ==
Pitt's 2011–12 schedule.

Date time, TV	Rank^{#}	Opponent^{#}	Result	Record	High points	High rebounds	High assists	Site (attendance) city, state
Scrimmage
Sat. Oct. 22*; 5:00 pm, Pitt Panthers TV / Comcast Network		Blue-Gold Scrimmage; Fan Fest/Maggie Dixon Heart Health Fair						Petersen Events Center (6,513); Pittsburgh, PA
Exhibition
Sat. Oct. 29*; 4:00 pm, Pitt Panthers TV / Comcast Network	No. 10	La Roche	W 101–33		16 – Birch	9 – Taylor	7 – Woodall	Petersen Events Center (6,525); Pittsburgh
Mon. Nov. 7*; 7:00 pm, Pitt Panthers TV / Comcast Network	No. 10	Kentucky Wesleyan	W 76–67		22 – Patterson	9 – Zanna	11 – Woodall	Petersen Events Center (6,536); Pittsburgh
Regular season
Fri. Nov. 11*; 7:00 pm, Pitt Panthers TV / Comcast Network / SNY / ESPN3	No. 10	Albany	W 89–56	1–0	25 – Woodall	8 – Taylor	10 – Woodall	Petersen Events Center (10,125); Pittsburgh
Sun. Nov. 13*; 6:00 pm, ESPN3	No. 10	Rider; Philly Hoop Group Classic	W 86–78	2–0	24 – Gibbs	8 – Patterson	10 – Woodall	Petersen Events Center (8,712); Pittsburgh
Wed. Nov. 16*; 9:00 pm, ESPNU	No. 9	Long Beach State	L 76–86	2–1	20 – Gibbs	6 – Zanna	4 – Gibbs, Patterson, Woodall	Petersen Events Center (8,215); Pittsburgh
Tue. Nov. 22*; 7:00 pm, ESPN3	No. 17	La Salle; Philly Hoop Group Classic	W 73–69	3–1	17 – Robinson	6 – Birch, Moore, Robinson, Taylor	10 – Woodall	Petersen Events Center (8,375); Pittsburgh
Fri. Nov. 25*; 7:00 pm, Pitt Panthers TV / Comcast Network Philadelphia	No. 17	at Penn; Philly Hoop Group Classic	W 78–58	4–1	16 – Gibbs	10 – Birch	7 – Woodall	The Palestra (6,843); Philadelphia
Sun. Nov. 27*; 5:00 pm, ESPN3 / Pitt Panthers TV / Comcast Network / SNY	No. 17	Robert Morris; Philly Hoop Group Classic	W 81–71	5–1	21 – Gibbs	15 – Zanna	10 – Woodall	Petersen Events Center (8,758); Pittsburgh
Wed. Nov. 30*; 7:00 pm, CBS Sports Network	No. 17	vs. Duquesne; The City Game	W 80–69	6–1	18 – Gibbs	11 – Taylor	7 – Woodall	CONSOL Energy Center (15,880); Pittsburgh
Sat. Dec. 3*; 5:15 pm, ESPN	No. 17	at Tennessee; SEC–Big East Invitational	W 61–56	7–1	16 – Gibbs, Robinson	12 – Robinson	6 – Gibbs	Thompson–Boling Arena (17,249); Knoxville, TN
Tue. Dec. 6*; 7:00 pm, Pitt Panthers TV / Comcast Network	No. 15	VMI	W 97–70	8–1	20 – Gibbs	14 – Robinson	6 – Patterson	Petersen Events Center (8,923); Pittsburgh
Sat. Dec. 10*; 2:30 pm, ESPN2	No. 15	vs. Oklahoma State; Carquest Auto Parts Classic	W 74–68	9–1	17 – Gibbs	10 – Patterson	7 – Patterson	Madison Square Garden (17,046); New York City
Sat. Dec. 17*; 6:00 pm, Pitt Panthers TV / Comcast Network / SNY	No. 15	South Carolina State	W 69–55	10–1	16 – Patterson	14 – Zanna	6 – Gibbs	Petersen Events Center (9,521); Pittsburgh
Tue. Dec. 20*; 7:00 pm, ESPN3	No. 15	St. Francis (PA)	W 71–47	11–1	15 – Moore	8 – Taylor	4 – Patterson	Petersen Events Center (8,325); Pittsburgh
Fri. Dec. 23*; 8:00 pm, ESPNU	No. 15	Wagner	L 54–59	11–2	14 – Gibbs	9 – Robinson	4 – Patterson	Petersen Events Center (9,315); Pittsburgh
Big East Regular Season
Tue. Dec. 27; 7:00 pm, ESPN2	No. 22	at Notre Dame	L 59–72	11–3 (0–1)	13 – Zanna	12 – Zanna	5 – Gibbs	Edmund P. Joyce Center (8,231); Notre Dame, IN
Sun. Jan. 1; 7:00 pm, ESPN Plus/Root Sports Pittsburgh	No. 22	Cincinnati	L 63–66	11–4 (0–2)	19 – Robinson	11 – Taylor	5 – Johnson	Petersen Events Center (12,508); Pittsburgh
Thu. Jan. 5; 7:00 pm, ESPN2		at DePaul	L 81–84	11–5 (0–3)	16 – Zanna	9 – Patterson	4 – Gibbs, Johnson	Allstate Arena (8,110); Rosemont, IL
Wed. Jan. 11; 7:00 pm, ESPN Plus/Root Sports Pittsburgh		Rutgers	L 39–62	11–6 (0–4)	10 – Moore	9 – Robinson	4 – Epps	Petersen Events Center (10,812); Pittsburgh
Sat. Jan. 14; 2:00 pm, ESPNU		at No. 25 Marquette	L 57–62	11–7 (0–5)	29 – Gibbs	7 – Robinson, Patterson	3 – Robinson	Bradley Center (18,404); Milwaukee, WI
Mon. Jan. 16; 7:30 pm, ESPN Big Monday		at No. 1 Syracuse	L 63–71	11–8 (0–6)	10 – Gibbs, Patterson, Wright	11 – Taylor	3 – Patterson, Robinson, Wright	Carrier Dome (24,826); Syracuse, New York
Sat. Jan. 21; 9:00 pm, ESPN College GameDay		No. 23 Louisville	L 62–73	11–9 (0–7)	14 – Gibbs, Patterson	7 – Robinson	7 – Patterson	Petersen Events Center (12,508); Pittsburgh
Wed. Jan. 25; 7:00 pm, ESPN Plus/Root Sports Pittsburgh		Providence	W 86–74	12–9 (1–7)	22 – Gibbs	11 – Patterson	9 – Woodall	Petersen Events Center (10,049); Pittsburgh
Sat. Jan. 28; 4:00 pm, ESPN		No. 10 Georgetown	W 72–60	13–9 (2–7)	23 – Robinson	10 – Zanna	10 – Woodall	Petersen Events Center (12,508); Pittsburgh
Mon. Jan. 30; 7:00 pm, ESPN Big Monday		at West Virginia; Backyard Brawl	W 72–66	14–9 (3–7)	24 – Woodall	7 – Taylor	4 – Patterson	WVU Coliseum (13,032); Morgantown, WV
Sun. Feb. 5; 2:00 pm, ESPN		Villanova	W 79–70	15–9 (4–7)	29 – Woodall	8 – Zanna	5 – Woodall	Petersen Events Center (12,508); Pittsburgh
Wed. Feb. 8; 7:00 pm, ESPN Plus/Root Sports Pittsburgh		at South Florida	L 51–63	15–10 (4–8)	11 – Woodall	5 – Robinson, Woodall, Zanna	2 – Robinson, Woodall	Tampa Bay Times Forum (4,507); Tampa, FL
Sun. Feb. 12; 12:00 pm, ESPN Plus/WTAE-TV, "Big East Game of the Week"		at Seton Hall	L 66–73	15–11 (4–9)	26 – Gibbs	9 – Robinson	6 – Woodall	Prudential Center (NA); Newark, NJ
Thu. Feb. 16; 9:00 pm, ESPN		West Virginia; Backyard Brawl	L 48–66	15–12 (4–10)	12 – Woodall	5 – Patterson, Robinson	8 – Woodall	Petersen Events Center (12,508); Pittsburgh
Sun. Feb. 19; 7:00 pm, ESPN2		South Florida	L 47–56	15–13 (4–11)	21 – Moore	11 – Robinson	3 – Robinson, Woodall	Petersen Events Center (9,849); Pittsburgh
Sun. Feb. 26; 2:00 pm, CBS		at No. 17 Louisville	L 54–57	15–14 (4–12)	16 – Moore	11 – Robinson	2 – Woodall, Robinson, Wright	KFC Yum! Center (22,746); Louisville, KY
Wed. Feb. 29; 7:00 pm, ESPNU		St. John's	W 89–69	16–14 (5–12)	19 – Gibbs	8 – Taylor	7 – Patterson	Petersen Events Center (9,449); Pittsburgh
Sat. Mar. 3; 12:00 pm, ESPN		at Connecticut	L 65–74	16–15 (5–13)	12 – Wright, Patterson	6 – Moore	5 – Woodall	Harry A. Gampel Pavilion (10,167); Storrs, CT
2012 Big East tournament
Tue. Mar. 6; 2:00 pm, ESPN2	No. (13)	vs. No. (12) St. John's; First Round	W 73–59	17–15	20 – Gibbs	8 – Robinson	6 – Woodall	Madison Square Garden (20,057); New York
Wed. Mar. 7; 2:00 pm, ESPN	No. (13)	vs. No. (5) Georgetown; Second Round	L 52–64	17–16	14 – Gibbs	8 – Patterson	6 – Patterson	Madison Square Garden (20,057); New York
2012 College Basketball Invitational
Wed. Mar. 14*; 7:00 pm		Wofford; First Round	W 81–63	18–16	16 – Moore, Woodall	11 – Robinson	9 – Woodall	Petersen Events Center (1,449); Pittsburgh
Mon. Mar. 19*; 7:00 pm		Princeton; Quarterfinals	W 82–61	19–16	19 – Patterson	10 – Patterson	11 – Woodall	Petersen Events Center (2,001); Pittsburgh
Wed. Mar. 21*; 7:00 pm, HDNet		at Butler; Semifinals	W 68–62 ^{OT}	20–16	15 – Zanna	10 – Patterson	7 – Patterson	Hinkle Fieldhouse (3,754); Indianapolis
Mon. Mar. 26*; 10:00 pm, HDNet		at Washington State; Finals–Game 1	L 66–67	20–17	16 – Moore, Woodall	5 – Patterson, Taylor	7 – Woodall	Beasley Coliseum (4,226); Pullman, Washington
Wed. Mar. 28*; 7:00 pm, HDNet		Washington State; Finals–Game 2	W 57–53	21–17	14 – Zanna	8 – Zanna	5 – Patterson, Woodall	Petersen Events Center (3,349); Pittsburgh
Fri. Mar. 30*; 7:00 pm, HDNet		Washington State; Finals–Game 3	W 71–65	22–17	17 – Woodall	7 – Patterson	7 – Woodall	Petersen Events Center (3,849); Pittsburgh
*Non-conference game. ^{#}Rankings from Division I AP Poll unless otherwise noted. (#) Tournament seedings in parentheses. All times are in Eastern Standard Time.

== Rankings ==
Ranking movement Legend: ██ Improvement in ranking. ██ Decrease in ranking. ██ Not ranked the previous week. rv=Others receiving votes.
Poll	Pre	Wk 1	Wk 2	Wk 3	Wk 4	Wk 5	Wk 6	Wk 7	Wk 8	Wk 9	Wk 10	Wk 11	Wk 12	Wk 13	Wk 14	Wk 15	Wk 16	Wk 17	Wk 18	Final
AP	10	9	17	17	15	15	15	22	rv	--	--	--	--	--	--	--	--	--	--	n/a
Coaches	11	9	16	17	14	14	13	22	rv	--	--	--	--	--	--	--	--	--	--	rv

== Season notes and accomplishments ==
- Pitt won the 2011 Philly Hoops Group Classic title with a perfect 4–0 record.
- Pitt lost to 2 unranked non-conference teams (Long Beach State and Wagner) at home, for the 1st time in one season. They only had one previous home non-conference loss at the Peterson Events Center.
- Freshman Khem Birch, at the time Pitt's starting center, left the team on December 16.
- Starting point guard Tray Woodall suffered a groin/abdominal injury during the Duquesne game on November 30 and did not return until the Notre Dame game on Tuesday, December 27. During the Notre Dame game he reaggravated his injury and did not reappear until the Louisville game on January 21.
- For the first time under head coach Jamie Dixon, the Pitt basketball team lost over three games in a row, eventually losing a total of eight straight games, its longest losing streak in 18 years. Also, for first time ever, Pitt opened its Big East Conference season with seven straight loses.
- After averaging 26.5 points, 5.0 rebounds, and 4.0 assists in wins over West Virginia and Villanova, point guard Tray Woodall was named the Oscar Robertson National Player of the Week on February 7, 2012, by the United States Basketball Writers Association.
