= Kyle Casey =

American basketball player (born 1990)

Free agent
- Position: Small forward

Personal information
- Born: November 27, 1990 (age 35) Medway, Massachusetts, U.S.
- Listed height: 6 ft 8 in (2.03 m)
- Listed weight: 229 lb (104 kg)

Career information
- High school: Brimmer and May (Chestnut Hill, Massachusetts)
- College: Harvard (2009–2014)
- NBA draft: 2014: undrafted
- Playing career: 2014–present

Career history
- 2014–2015: Helios Suns Domžale
- 2015–2016: Bakersfield Jam
- 2016: Helios Suns Domžale
- 2017–2018: Wisconsin Herd
- 2018–2019: Memphis Hustle
- 2019–2020: Earthfriends Tokyo Z
- 2020: Abejas de León

Career highlights
- Slovenian League All-Star (2015); First-team All-Ivy League (2012); Second-team All-Ivy League (2011); Ivy League Rookie of the Year (2010)
- Stats at Basketball Reference

Kyle David Casey (born November 27, 1990) is an American professional basketball player who last played for the Abejas de León of the Mexican LNBP. He played college basketball for Harvard.

== High school career ==
Casey attended Brimmer and May school where he averaged five blocks per game as a senior along with nearly 20 points and 12 rebounds per game. At B&M, he earned several awards, including a Reebok All-America selection, a McDonald's All-America nomination, MVP honors at the 2009 St. Sebastian's Tournament, and was the team MVP for three years.

== College career ==
In four seasons at Harvard, Casey was a two-time All-Ivy League selection and was voted as the league's rookie of the year in 2010. He averaged 10.5 points and 5.5 rebounds per game for his career, and after graduating, he ranked 13th in program history for career points (1,242), 10th for career rebounds (654) and third for career blocks (127). Casey helped the Crimson reach the third round of the NCAA tournament in 2014 after capturing a fourth consecutive Ivy League title. On that span, he led the team with four double-doubles and scored in double-figures 18 times.

=== Grade controversy ===
During his initial senior year at Harvard, it was revealed that Casey and teammate Brandyn Curry were among the 125 students involved with the university's 2012 cheating scandal. As a result of the scandal, Casey was forced to sit out of the team's 2012–13 season.

== Professional career ==
After going undrafted in the 2014 NBA draft, Casey joined the Brooklyn Nets for the 2014 NBA Summer League. On August 29, 2014, he signed with Slovenian club Helios Suns Domžale for the 2014–15 season, playing in 32 games and averaging 12.4 points and 7.1 rebounds while shooting 52.8 percent from the field.

On September 16, 2015, Casey signed with the Phoenix Suns. However, he was later waived on October 15 after appearing in one preseason game. On November 2, he was acquired by the Bakersfield Jam of the NBA Development League as an affiliate player of the Suns. On November 13, he made his debut for the Jam in a 104–87 loss to the Santa Cruz Warriors, recording 10 points, six rebounds, four assists, one steal and two blocks in 26 minutes.

On June 29, 2016, Casey returned to Helios Suns Domžale.

On August 23, 2017, Casey was selected by the Wisconsin Herd in the NBA G League expansion draft.

On September 24, 2018, Kyle Casey's NBA G League player rights were traded to the Memphis Hustle who play in Southaven at Landers Center.

Casey spent the 2019–20 season with Earthfriends Tokyo Z of the B.League. He averaged 18.7 points, 11.2 rebounds, 3.9 assists and 1.2 steals per game. On August 11, 2020, Casey signed with the Abejas de León of the LNBP.

== Personal life ==
Casey's mother, Sharon, ran track and field at Texas Southern and in high school alongside Jackie Joyner-Kersee, while his older brother, Randy, played basketball at nearby Wheaton College and Dean College. Casey majored in sociology.

After withdrawing from Harvard in 2012, he worked for a non-profit organization, 3PointFoundation, helping local kids to improve at school and teaching them basketball.
