= 2012 College Basketball Invitational =

College basketball tournament

- Teams: 16
- Finals site: Beasley Coliseum; Petersen Events Center; Pullman, Washington; Pittsburgh, Pennsylvania
- Champions: Pittsburgh Panthers (1st title)
- Runner-up: Washington State Cougars (1st title game)
- Semifinalists: Oregon State Beavers (2nd semifinal); Butler Bulldogs (1st semifinal)
- Winning coach: Jamie Dixon (1st title)
- MVP: Lamar Patterson (Pittsburgh)

The 2012 College Basketball Invitational (CBI) was a single-elimination tournament of 16 NCAA Division I teams that did not participate in the 2012 NCAA Tournament or the 2012 National Invitation Tournament. The opening games began on Tuesday, March 13. A best-of-three championship series between the final two teams was held on March 26, March 28, and March 30. HDNet covered select games from the first and second rounds as well as the semifinals and the championship games for the fourth consecutive year. The tournament was won by Pittsburgh who defeated Washington State 2–1 in the finals series.

== Participants ==
School	Conference	Overall record	Conference record
Butler	Horizon	20–14	11–7
Delaware	CAA	18–13	12–6
Evansville	Missouri Valley	16–15	9–9
Milwaukee	Horizon	20–13	11–7
North Dakota State	Summit	17–13	9–9
Oregon State	Pac-12	19–14	7–11
Pennsylvania	Ivy	19–12	11–3
Pittsburgh	Big East	17–16	5–13
Princeton	Ivy	19–11	10–4
Quinnipiac	NEC	18–13	10–8
San Francisco	WCC	20–13	8–8
TCU	Mountain West	17–14	7–7
Washington State	Pac-12	15–16	7–11
Western Illinois	Summit	18–14	9–9
Wofford	SoCon	19–13	12–6
Wyoming	Mountain West	20–11	6–8

== Bracket ==
First round March 13–14
Milwaukee	73
TCU	83
Western Illinois	59
Oregon State	80
North Dakota State	75
Wyoming	76
Washington State	89
San Francisco	75
Delaware	58
Butler	75
Quinnipiac	63
Pennsylvania	74
Princeton	95
Evansville	86
Wofford	63
Pittsburgh	81

Quarterfinals; March 19
TCU	81
Oregon State	101
Wyoming	41
Washington State	61
Butler	63
Pennsylvania	53
Princeton	61
Pittsburgh	82

Semifinals (Reseeded); March 21
Washington State	72
Oregon State	55
Pittsburgh	68^{OT}
Butler	62

Finals (Best of three); March 26, 28, 30
Washington State	67	53	65
Pittsburgh	66	57	71

Home teams are listed second.
