= James Turner =

James Turner may refer to:

== Entertainment ==
- James Alfred Turner (1850–1908), Australian painter
- James Turner (illustrator) (active 2005–2008), Canadian writer and illustrator of graphic novels
- James Turner, a character in Swallows and Amazons
- James Turner, a character in the 2017 film Death Note

== Politics ==
- James Aspinall Turner (1797–1867), British businessman, entomologist and Whig politician
- James M. Turner (politician) (1928–1981), American politician and criminal from New Jersey
- James Milton Turner (1840–1915), ambassador to Liberia and asst. superintendent of Missouri schools
- James Munroe Turner (1850–1896), American politician in Michigan
- James Turner (Canadian politician) (1826–1889), Scottish merchant and political figure in Ontario
- James Turner (Maryland politician) (1783–1861), U.S. congressman
- James Turner (North Carolina politician) (1766–1824), U.S. governor and senator
- James Turner, 1st Baron Netherthorpe (1908–1980), British peer
- James Harvey Turner (1930–1991), Mississippi state legislator

== Sports ==
- James Turner (American football) (born 2000), American football placekicker
- James Turner (footballer) (1898–1973), English footballer
- James Turner (Nottinghamshire cricketer) (1865–1945), English cricketer
- James Turner (parathlete) (born 1996), Australian Paralympic athlete
- James Turner (rugby union) (born 1998), Australian rugby union player
- James Turner (tennis) (born 1965), British tennis player
- J. W. Cecil Turner (James William Cecil Turner, 1886–1968), English cricketer
- Lefty Turner (James Henry Turner, 1912–2000), American Negro leagues baseball player
- Amy James-Turner (born 1991), English footballer
- Angharad James-Turner (born 1994), Welsh footballer

== Other ==
- J. C. Turner (1916–1996), American labor union leader
- James E. Turner (1940–2022), American Africana studies scholar
- James Gordon Melville Turner (1907–1967), British merchant seaman
- James Luther Turner (1891–1964), founder of J.L. Turner and Son
- James M. Turner (physicist), American physicist and retired government official
- James Smith Turner (1832–1904), Scottish dentist
- James T. Turner (born 1938), judge of the United States Claims Court
- James Turner (architect) (c. 1852–1899), Architect based in Matlock, Derbyshire
- James Turner (bishop) (1829–1893), Australian Anglican bishop
- James Turner (historian) (born 1946), American historian and professor
- James Turner (silversmith) (1721–1759), American silversmith and engraver
- James Turner (soldier) (1615–c. 1686), 17th-century Scottish general

== See also ==
- James Turner Street in Birmingham, England
- James Turner-Rolle, Bahamian politician
- Jamie Turner (born 1962), Australian rules footballer for Collingwood
- Jim Turner (disambiguation)
- Jimmy Turner (disambiguation)
- Jock Turner (Australian footballer) (1909–1935), Australian rules footballer for Essendon
