= Columbia Lions men's basketball statistical leaders =

The Columbia Lions men's basketball statistical leaders are individual statistical leaders of the Columbia Lions basketball program in various categories, including points, rebounds, assists, steals, and blocks. Within those areas, the lists identify single-game, single-season, and career leaders. The Lions represent Columbia University in the NCAA's Ivy League.

Columbia began competing in intercollegiate basketball in 1900. However, the school's record book does not generally list records from before the 1950s, as records from before this period are often incomplete and inconsistent. Since scoring was much lower in this era, and teams played much fewer games during a typical season, it is likely that few or no players from this era would appear on these lists anyway.

The NCAA did not officially record assists as a stat until the 1983–84 season, and blocks and steals until the 1985–86 season, but Columbia's record books includes players in these stats before these seasons. These lists are updated through the end of the 2019–20 season.

== Scoring ==
Career
Rk	Player	Points	Seasons
1	Buck Jenkins	1,767	1989–90 1990–91 1991–92 1992–93
2	Jim McMillian	1,758	1967–68 1968–69 1969–70
3	Maodo Lo	1,756	2012–13 2013–14 2014–15 2015–16
4	Mike Smith	1,653	2016–17 2017–18 2018–19 2019–20
5	Chet Forte	1,611	1954–55 1955–56 1956–57
6	Craig Austin	1,491	1998–99 1999–00 2000–01 2001–02
7	Alex Rosenberg	1,430	2011–12 2012–13 2013–14 2015–16
8	Geronimo Rubio De La Rosa	1,414	2021–22 2022–23 2023–24 2024–25
9	Gary Raimondo	1,320	1995–96 1996–97 1997–98 1998–99
10	John Baumann	1,298	2004–05 2005–06 2006–07 2007–08

Season
Rk	Player	Points	Season
1	Chet Forte	694	1956–57
2	Mike Smith	684	2019–20
3	Jim McMillian	643	1969–70
4	Jim McMillian	625	1967–68
5	Maodo Lo	591	2015–16
6	Buck Jenkins	578	1992–93
7	Chet Forte	559	1954–55
8	Dave Newmark	550	1965–66
9	Sean Couch	549	1986–87
10	Alex Rosenberg	544	2013–14

Single game
Rk	Player	Points	Season	Opponent
1	Buck Jenkins	47	1990–91	Harvard
2	Chet Forte	45	1956–57	Penn
3	Jim McMillian	44	1969–70	Penn State
4	Jim McMillian	42	1969–70	Villanova
	Chet Forte	42	1956–57	CCNY
6	Stan Felsinger	40	1965–66	Dartmouth
	Jim McMillian	40	1969–70	Harvard
	Jim McMillian	40	1967–68	WVU
	Dave Newmark	40	1967–68	Yale

== Rebounds ==
Career
Rk	Player	Rebounds	Seasons
1	Frank Thomas	1,022	1953–54 1954–55 1955–56
2	Jim McMillian	743	1967–68 1968–69 1969–70
3	Jack Molinas	727	1950–51 1951–52 1952–53
4	Ed Auzenbergs	675	1958–59 1959–60 1960–61
5	Ricky Free	662	1976–77 1977–78 1978–79
6	Chris Wiedemann	593	1999–00 2000–01 2001–02 2002–03
7	Mark Cisco	591	2009–10 2010–11 2011–12 2012–13
8	Dave Newmark	572	1965–66 1966–67 1967–68
9	John Baumann	570	2004–05 2005–06 2006–07 2007–08
10	Russ Steward	552	1988–89 1989–90 1990–91 1991–92

Season
Rk	Player	Rebounds	Season
1	Frank Thomas	408	1954–55
2	Jack Molinas	384	1952–53
3	Dave Newmark	346	1965–66
4	Jack Molinas	343	1950–51
5	Frank Thomas	338	1955–56
6	Ted Harvin	307	1956–57
7	Frank Thomas	276	1953–54
8	Phil Matthews	275	1957–58
	Jim McMillian	275	1967–68
10	Mike Griffin	265	1964–65

Single game
Rk	Player	Rebounds	Season	Opponent
1	Jack Molinas	31	1952–53	Brown
2	Dave Newmark	26	1965–66	Brown
3	Foley Jones	25	1971–72	CCNY
4	Patrick Harding	21	2021–22	Pennsylvania
5	Mark Cisco	20	2011–12	Cornell
	Dave Newmark	20	1965–66	Brown
	Dave Newmark	20	1965–66	CCNY
	Vernon Outlaw	20	1980–81	Vermont

== Assists ==
Career
Rk	Player	Assists	Seasons
1	Alton Byrd	526	1976–77 1977–78 1978–79
2	Mike Smith	393	2016–17 2017–18 2018–19 2019–20
3	Brian Barbour	346	2009–10 2010–11 2011–12 2012–13
4	Tony Chiles	323	1985–86 1986–87 1987–88 1988–89
5	Elliot Wolfe	316	1968–69 1969–70 1970–71
6	Darren Burnett	313	1979–80 1980–81 1981–82 1982–83
7	Brett Loscalzo	308	2004–05 2005–06 2006–07 2007–08
8	Isaac Cohen	303	2012–13 2013–14 2014–15 2015–16
9	Mike Jelinsky	301	1989–90 1990–91 1992–93
10	Kenny Noland	283	2022–23 2023–24 2024–25 2025–26

Season
Rk	Player	Assists	Season
1	Alton Byrd	210	1976–77
2	Alton Byrd	193	1978–79
3	Mike Jelinsky	153	1989–90
4	Mike Jelinsky	145	1990–91
5	Elliot Wolfe	140	1970–71
6	Tony Chiles	136	1987–88
7	Mike Smith	134	2019–20
8	Brian Barbour	133	2011–12
9	Dale Smith	130	1984–85
10	Mike Smith	124	2017–18

Single game
Rk	Player	Assists	Season	Opponent
1	Tony Chiles	18	1987–88	USMMA
2	Tony Chiles	14	1988–89	Brown
	Maurice Murphy	14	2002–03	Lafayette
	Elliot Wolfe	14	1970–71	Cornell
5	Alton Byrd	13	1978–79	Brown

== Steals ==
Career
Rk	Player	Steals	Seasons
1	Gary Raimondo	209	1995–96 1996–97 1997–98 1998–99
2	Maodo Lo	182	2012–13 2013–14 2014–15 2015–16
3	Sean Couch	156	1983–84 1984–85 1985–86 1986–87
4	Geronimo Rubio De La Rosa	144	2021–22 2022–23 2023–24 2024–25
5	Kenny Noland	125	2022–23 2023–24 2024–25 2025–26
6	Brian Barbour	124	2009–10 2010–11 2011–12 2012–13
	Mike Smith	124	2016–17 2017–18 2018–19 2019–20
8	Matt Shannon	110	1985–86 1986–87 1987–88 1988–89
9	C.J. Thompkins	109	1993–94 1994–95 1995–96 1996–97
10	Blair Thompson	108	2022–23 2023–24 2024–25 2025–26

Season
Rk	Player	Steals	Season
1	Maodo Lo	78	2015–16
2	Sean Couch	68	1986–87
3	Gary Raimondo	67	1998–99
4	Gary Raimondo	56	1997–98
5	Sean Couch	53	1985–86
6	Gary Raimondo	52	1995–96
7	Mike Smith	46	2019–20
8	Quinton Adlesh	45	2018–19
9	Jim Tubridy	44	1995–96
10	Tony Chiles	43	1987–88
	Brian Barbour	43	2012–13
	Maodo Lo	43	2014–15

Single game
Rk	Player	Steals	Season	Opponent
1	Maodo Lo	7	2015–16	Yale
	Sean Couch	7	1986–87	NYU
	Gary Raimondo	7	1998–99	Harvard
	Craig Austin	7	2000–01	Binghamton
5	Grant Mullins	6	2015–16	Penn
	Gary Raimondo	6	1997–98	Dartmouth
7	Maodo Lo	5	2015–16	Dartmouth
	Maodo Lo	5	2015–16	Lehigh
	Niko Scott	5	2009–10	Brown
	Brian Barbour	5	2012–13	Brown
	Zavian McLean	5	2021–22	Dartmouth
	Geronimo Rubio De La Rosa	5	2023–24	Dartmouth
	Miles Franklin	5	2025–26	Longwood
	Kenny Noland	5	2025–26	Yale

== Blocks ==
Career
Rk	Player	Blocks	Seasons
1	Chris Wiedemann	187	1999–00 2000–01 2001–02 2002–03
2	Dane Holmes	148	1988–89 1989–90 1990–91 1991–92
3	Tom Casey	137	1989–90 1990–91 1991–92 1992–93
4	Jamal Adams	101	1990–91 1991–92 1992–93 1993–94
5	Luke Petrasek	95	2013–14 2014–15 2015–16 2016–17
6	Cory Osetkowski	90	2011–12 2012–13 2013–14 2014–15
7	Patrick Tapé	76	2016–17 2017–18 2018–19
8	Mark Cisco	72	2009–10 2010–11 2011–12 2012–13
9	Joe Case	66	1998–99 1999–00 2000–01 2001–02
10	Ben Nwachukwu	62	2004–05 2005–06 2006–07 2007–08

Season
Rk	Player	Blocks	Season
1	Chris Wiedemann	68	2001–02
2	Dane Holmes	61	1989–90
3	Tom Casey	54	1991–92
	Tom Casey	54	1992–93
5	Chris Wiedemann	47	2000–01
6	Dane Holmes	45	1988–89
	Chris Wiedemann	45	2002–03
8	Jamal Adams	43	1993–94
9	Luke Petrasek	41	2015–16
10	Dane Holmes	39	1990–91

Single game
Rk	Player	Blocks	Season	Opponent
1	Dane Holmes	9	1989–90	Lehigh
2	Patrick Tapé	5	2018–19	Cornell
	Luke Petrasek	5	2015–16	NJIT
	Noruwa Agho	5	2010–11	Lafayette
	Dane Holmes	5	1989–90	Penn
	Dane Holmes	5	1989–90	Yale
	Cory Osetkowski	5	2013–14	Cornell
	Josh Odunowo	5	2021–22	Binghamton
