= Jim Turner =

Jim Turner may refer to:

== Entertainment ==
- Jim Turner (editor) (1945–1999), editor at Arkham House
- Jim Turner (comedian) (born 1952), American comedian and actor
- Jim Turner (singer) (born 1946), American country singer and songwriter on The Lawrence Welk Show

== Sports ==
=== American football ===
- Jim Turner (center) (1912–1995), American football player
- Jim Turner (placekicker) (1941–2023), American football player
- Jim Turner (American football coach) (born 1965), American football coach

=== Other sports ===
- Jim Turner (baseball) (1903–1998), Major League Baseball pitcher
- Jim Turner (basketball), American basketball player
- Jim Turner (sailor) (born 1975), New Zealand Olympic sailor

== Others ==
- Jim Turner (criminal) (fl. 1854–1866), American criminal figure, pugilist, and enforcer for Tammany Hall
- Jim Turner (politician) (born 1946), U.S. Congressman from Texas
- James Harvey Turner (1930–1991), Mississippi state legislator

== See also ==
- Jimmy Turner (disambiguation)
- James Turner (disambiguation)
- Turner (surname)
