= James M. Turner =

James M. Turner may refer to:

== Politics ==
- James Milton Turner (1840–1915), ambassador to Liberia and asst. superintendent of Missouri schools
- James M. Turner (New Jersey politician) (1928–1981), American politician and criminal from New Jersey
- James Munroe Turner (1850–1896), American politician in Michigan

== Sciences ==
- James M. Turner (physicist), American physicist and retired government official

== See also ==
- James Turner (disambiguation)
