= Ivy League Men's Basketball Player of the Year =

US sports award

- Awarded for: Most outstanding college basketball player in the Ivy League
- Country: United States

History
- First award: 1975
- Most recent: Nick Townsend, Yale

The Ivy League Men's Basketball Player of the Year is an award given to the Ivy League's most outstanding player. The award was first given following the 1974–75 season. There have been six players honored on two occasions: Craig Robinson, Kit Mueller, Jerome Allen, Ugonna Onyekwe, Ibrahim Jaaber and Justin Sears. No player has ever won the award three times.

There have been three ties for player of the year in the award's history: in 1981–82 (Paul Little of Penn and Craig Robinson of Princeton); in 1992–93 (Jerome Allen of Penn and Buck Jenkins of Columbia); and in 2019–20 (Paul Atkinson of Yale and A. J. Brodeur of Penn).

There was no 2021 award because the Ivy League canceled all winter sports for the 2020–21 season, including men's basketball, due to COVID-19 concerns.

== Key ==
†	Co-Players of the Year
*	Awarded a national player of the year award that same season: Helms Foundation College Basketball Player of the Year (1904–05 to 1978–79); UPI College Basketball Player of the Year (1954–55 to 1995–96); Oscar Robertson Trophy (1958–59 to present); Naismith College Player of the Year (1968–69 to present); John R. Wooden Award (1976–77 to present)
Player (X)	Denotes the number of times the player has been awarded the Ivy League Player of the Year award at that point

== Winners ==
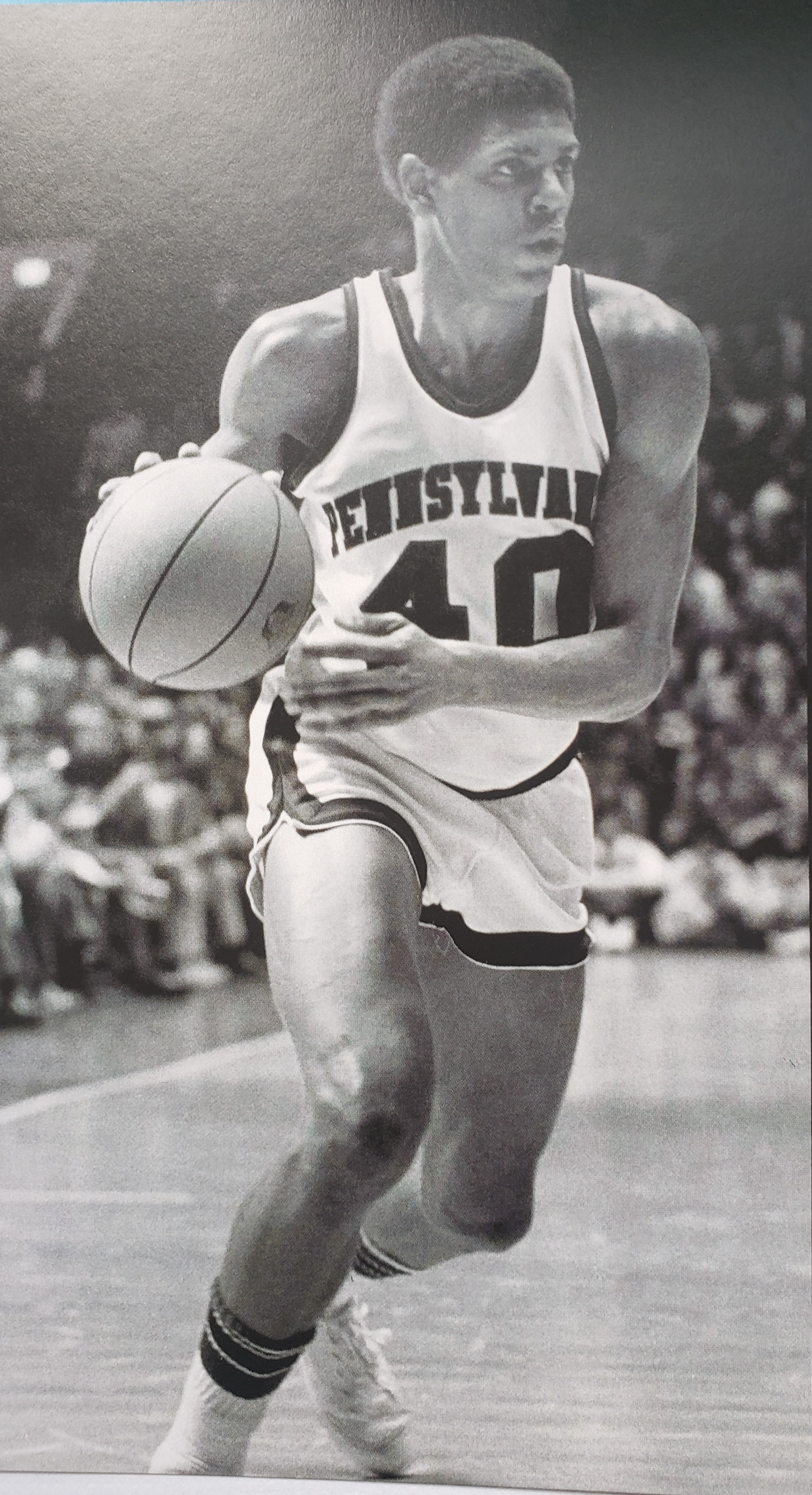
Keven McDonald, Penn, 1978

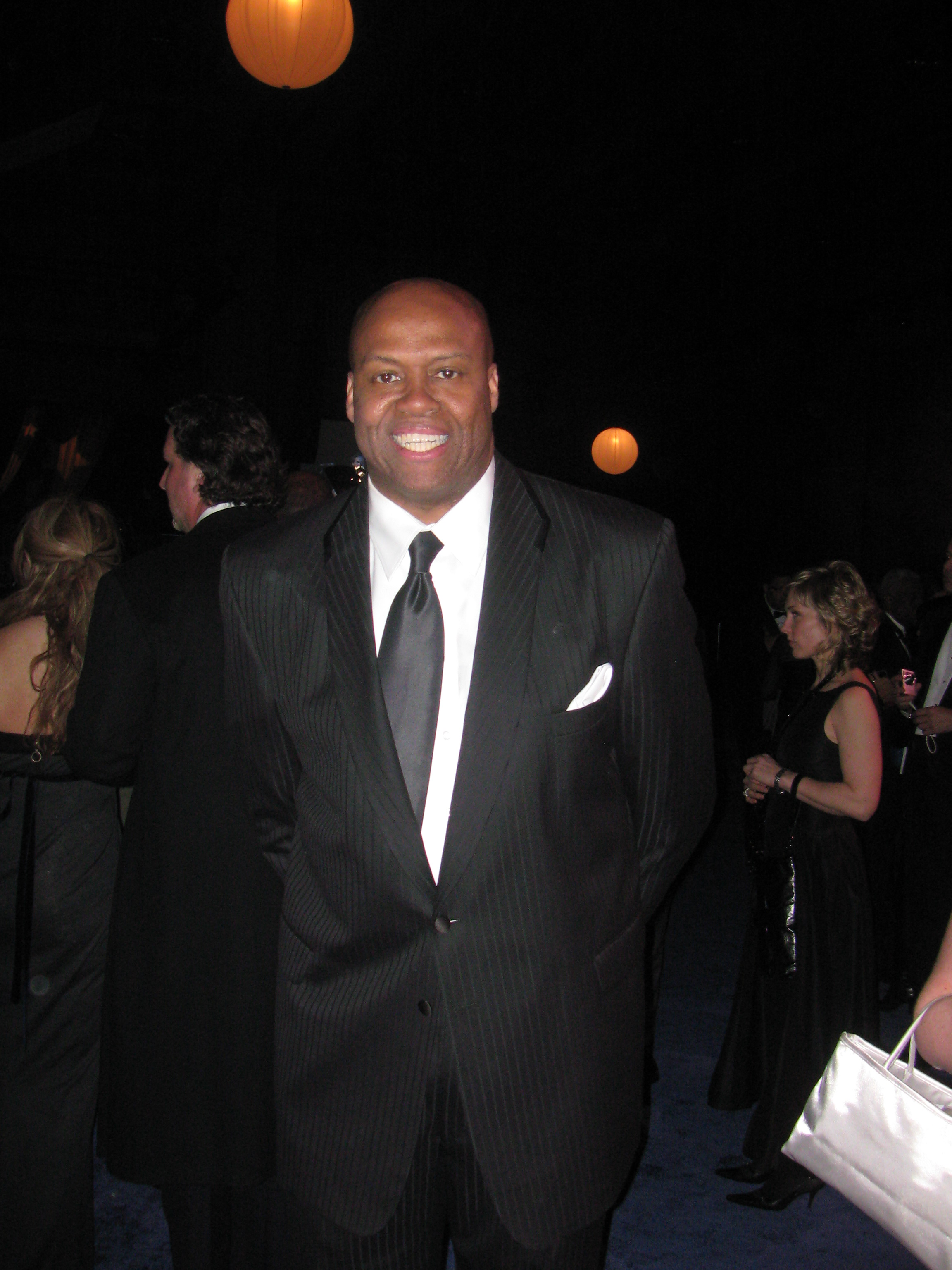
Craig Robinson, Princeton, 1982 and 1983

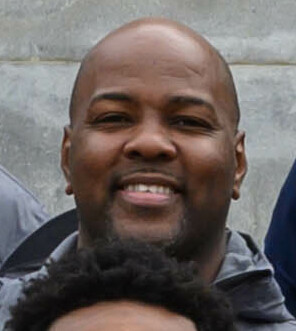
Ira Bowman, Penn, 1996

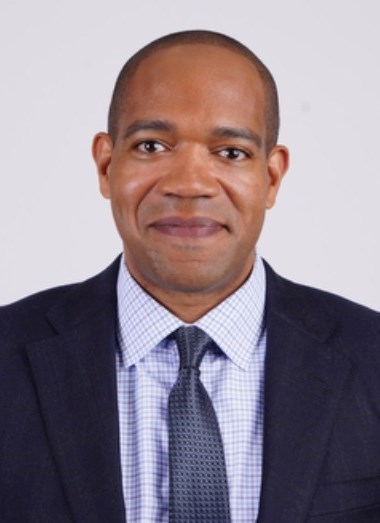
Sydney Johnson, Princeton, 1997

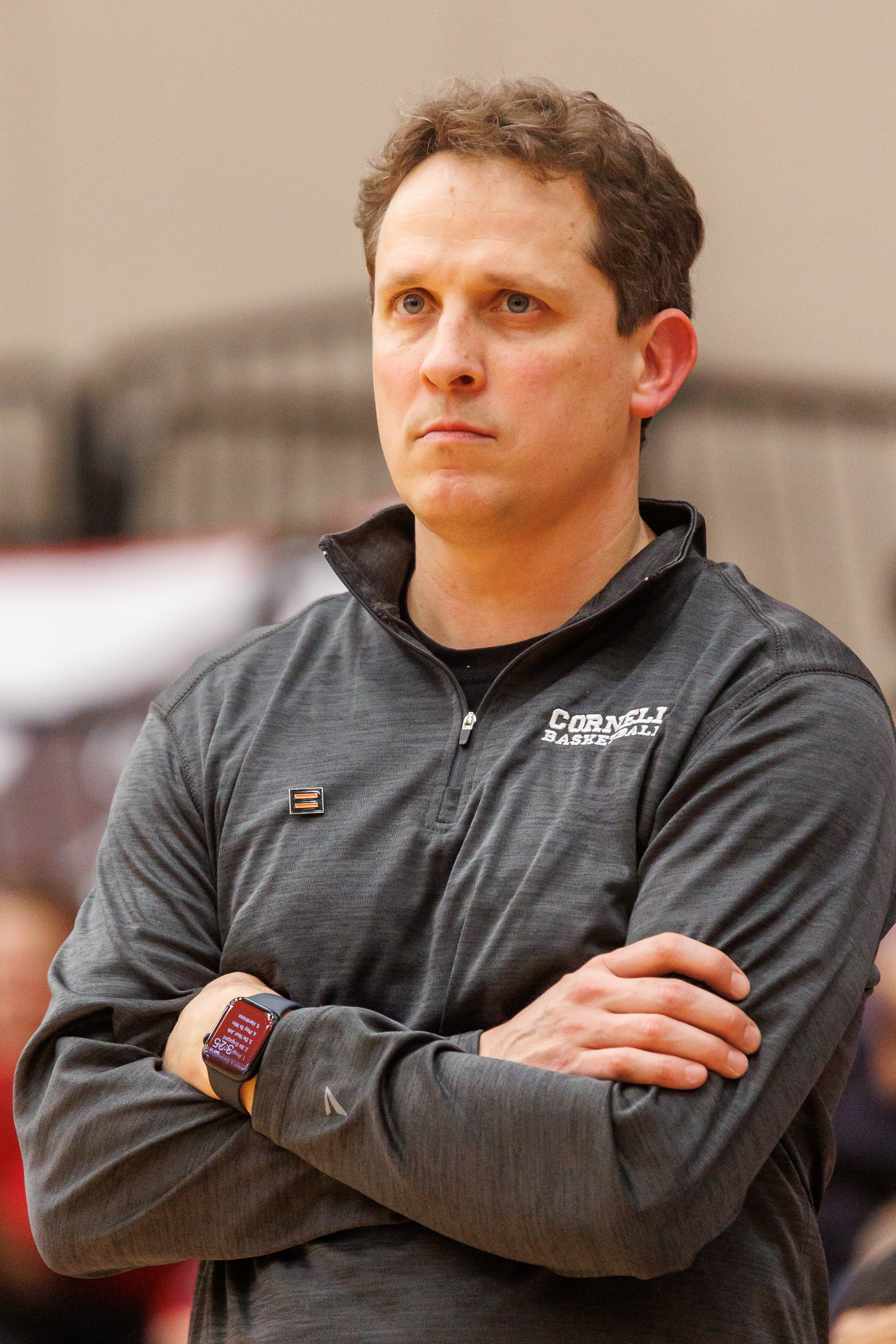
Brian Earl, Princeton, 1999

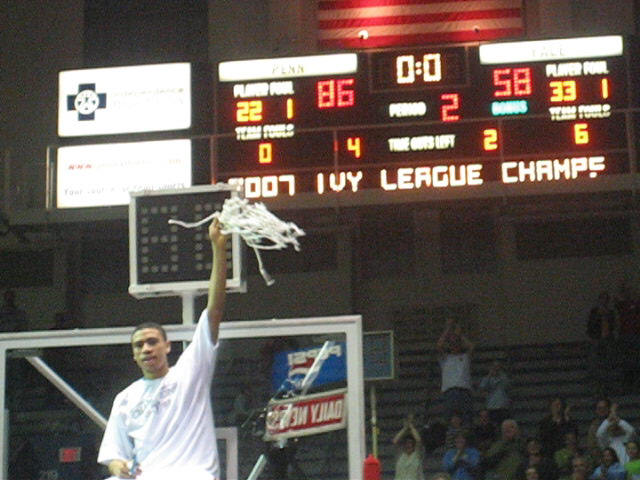
Ibrahim Jaaber, Penn, 2006 and 2007

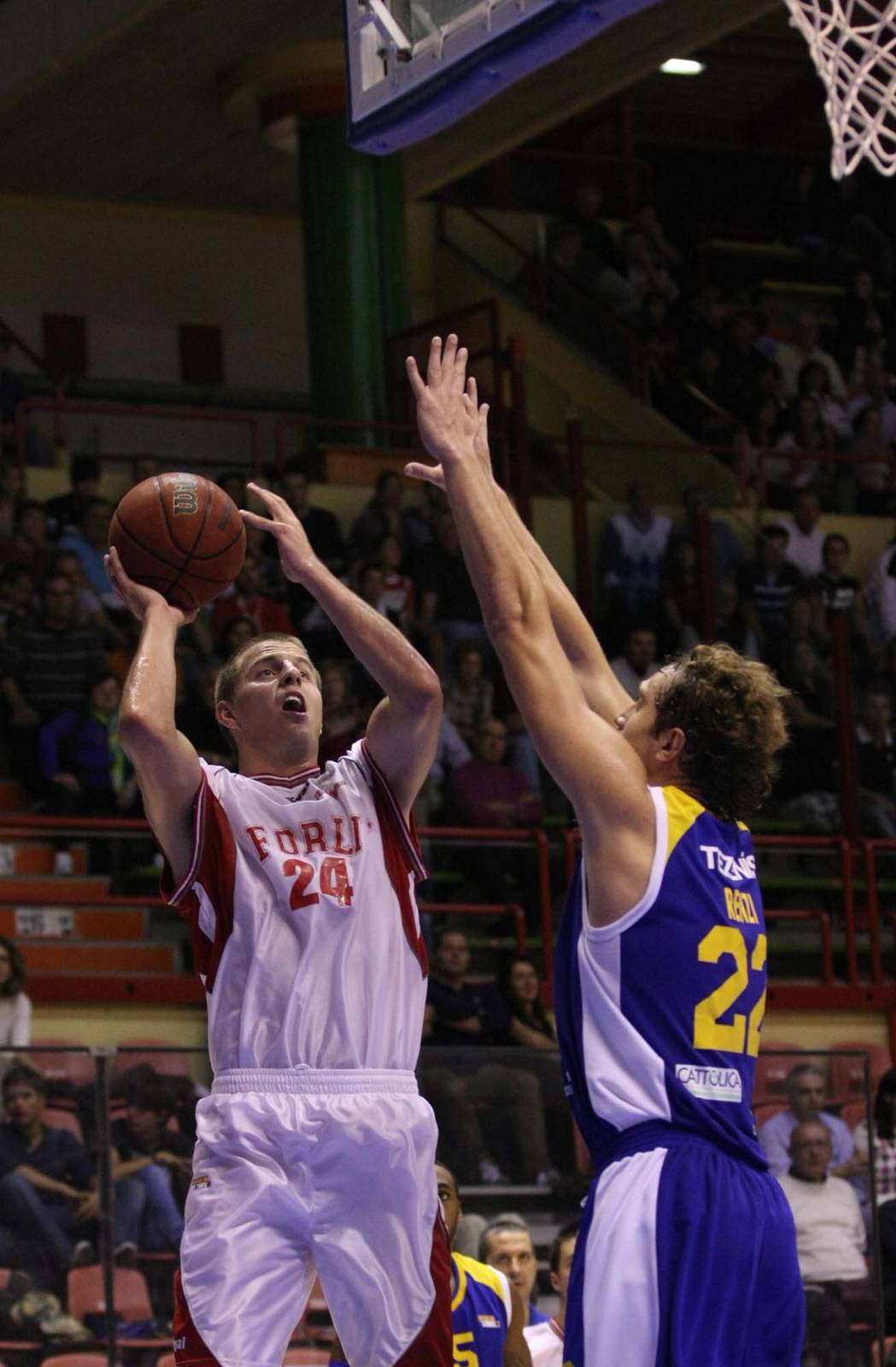
Ryan Wittman, Cornell, 2010

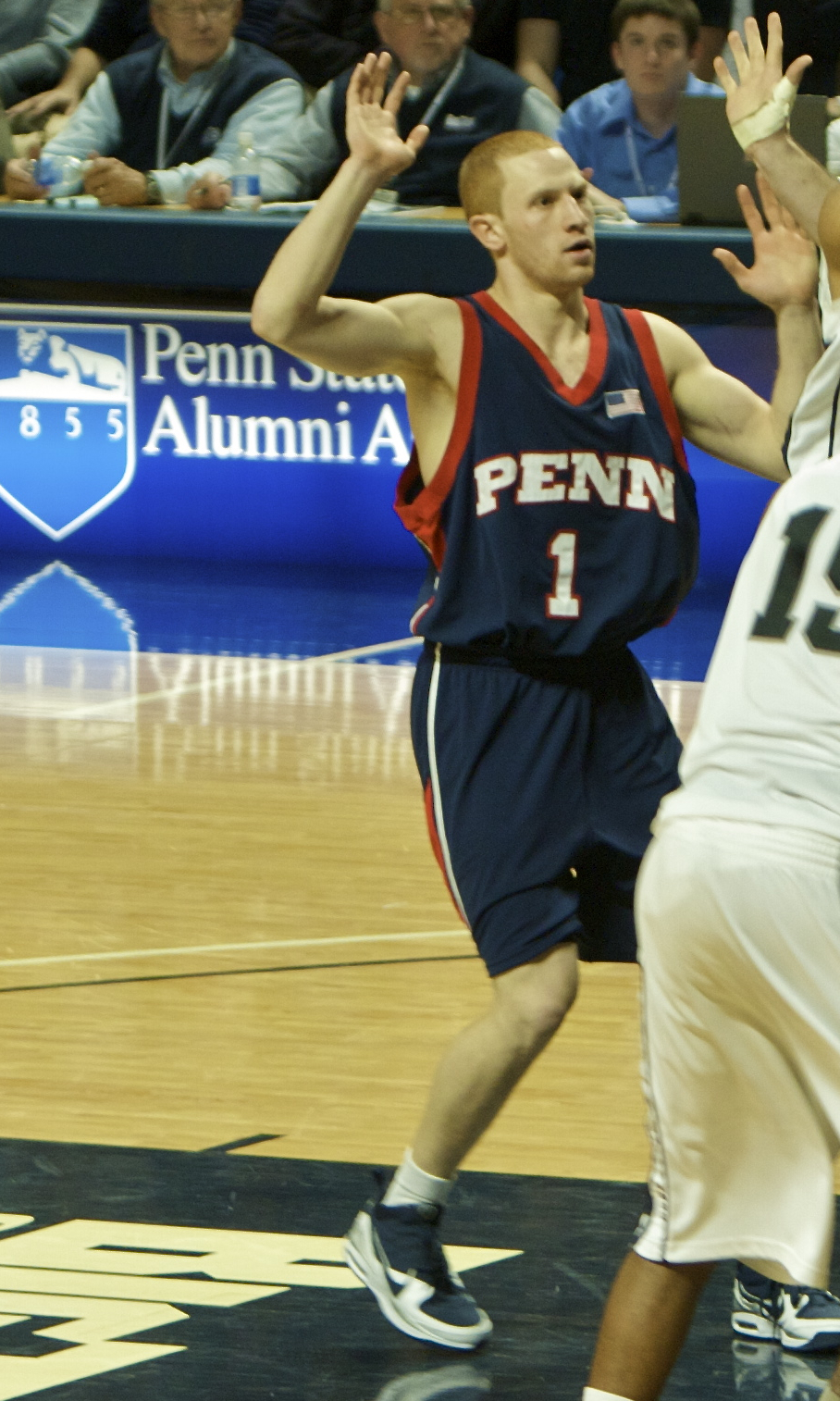
Zack Rosen, Penn, 2012

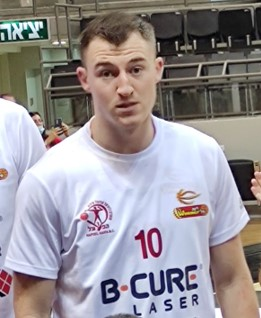
Spencer Weisz, Princeton, 2017

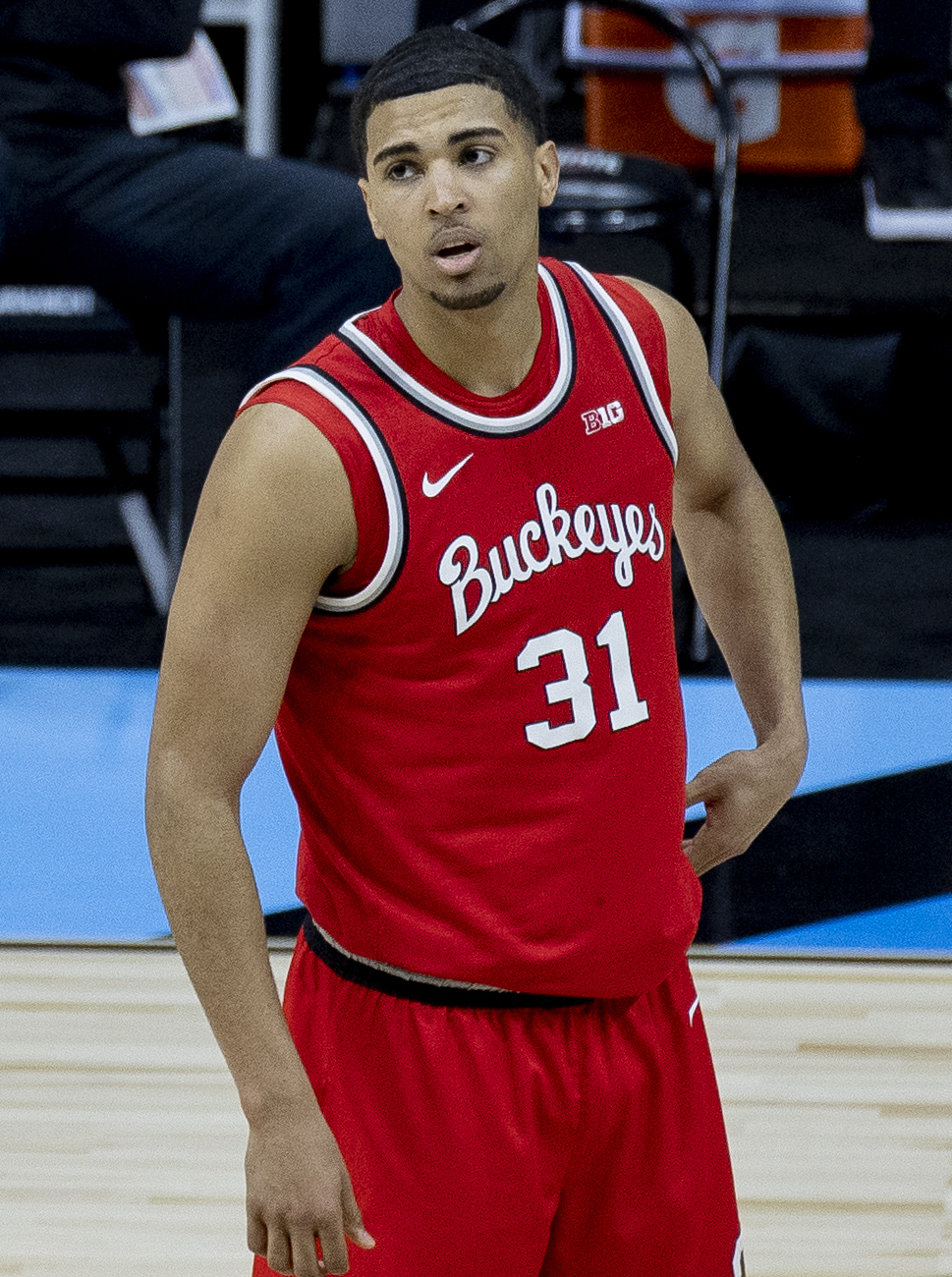
Seth Towns, Harvard, 2018

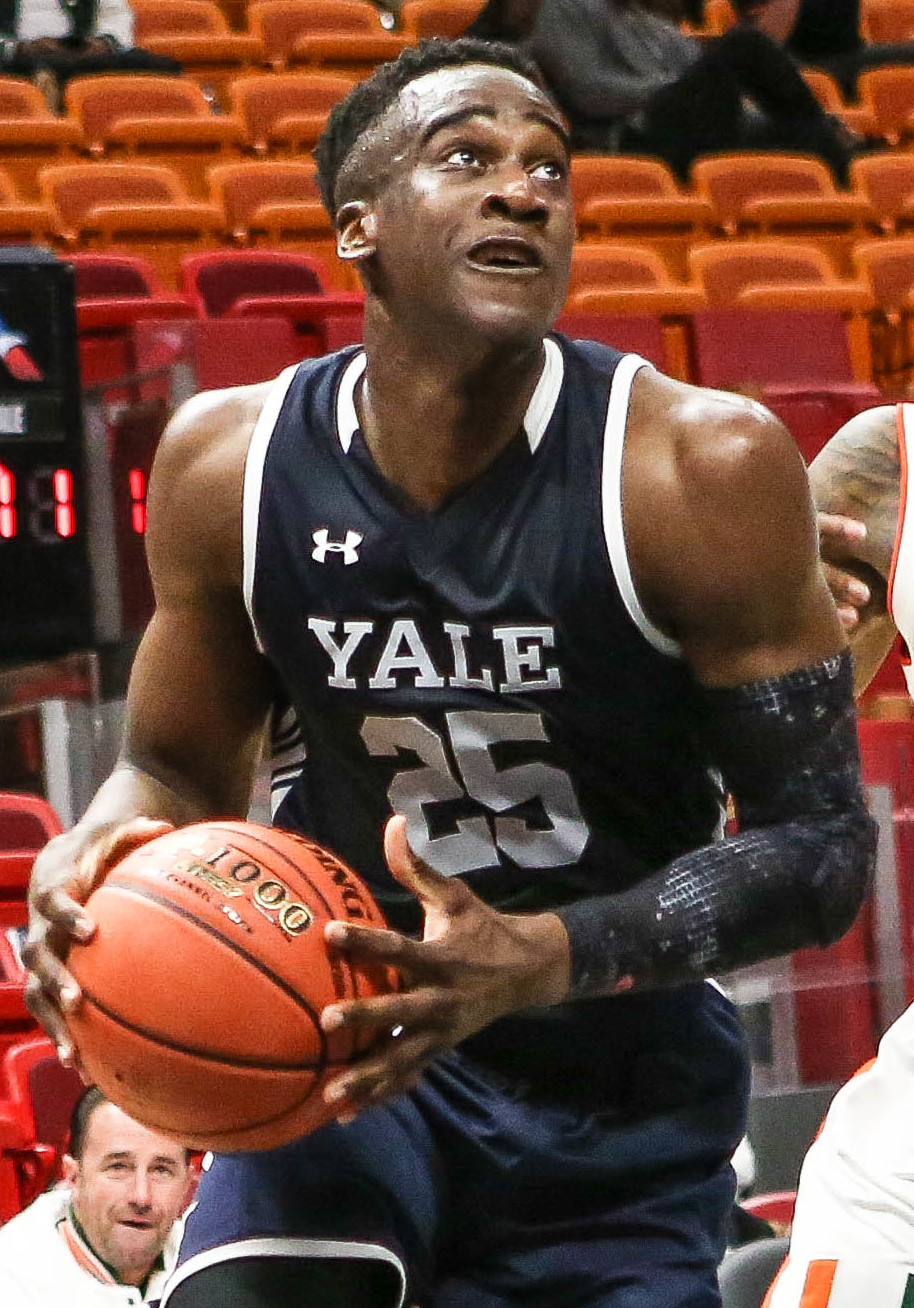
Miye Oni, Yale, 2019

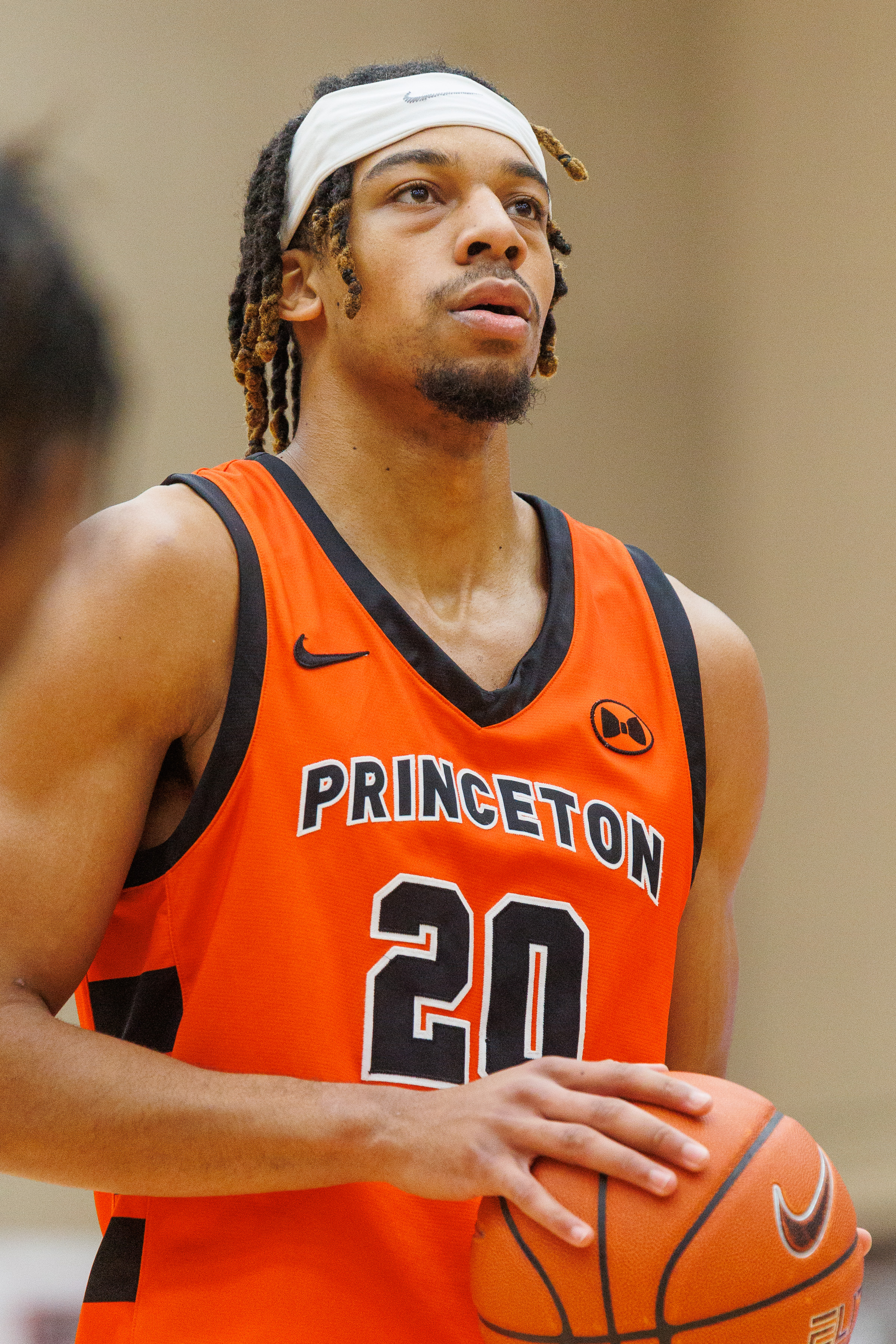
Tosan Evbuomwan, Princeton, 2022

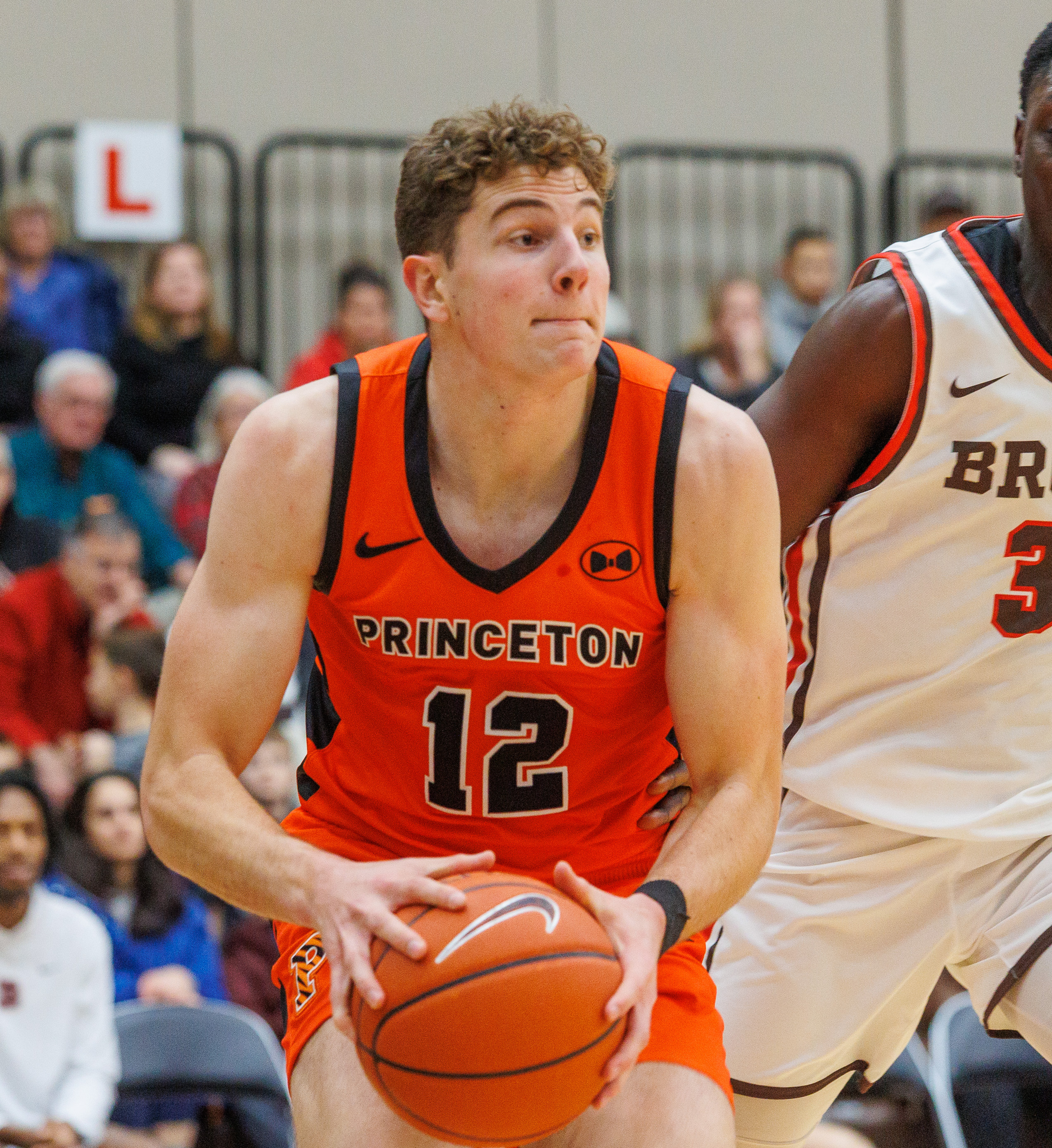
Caden Pierce, Princeton, 2024

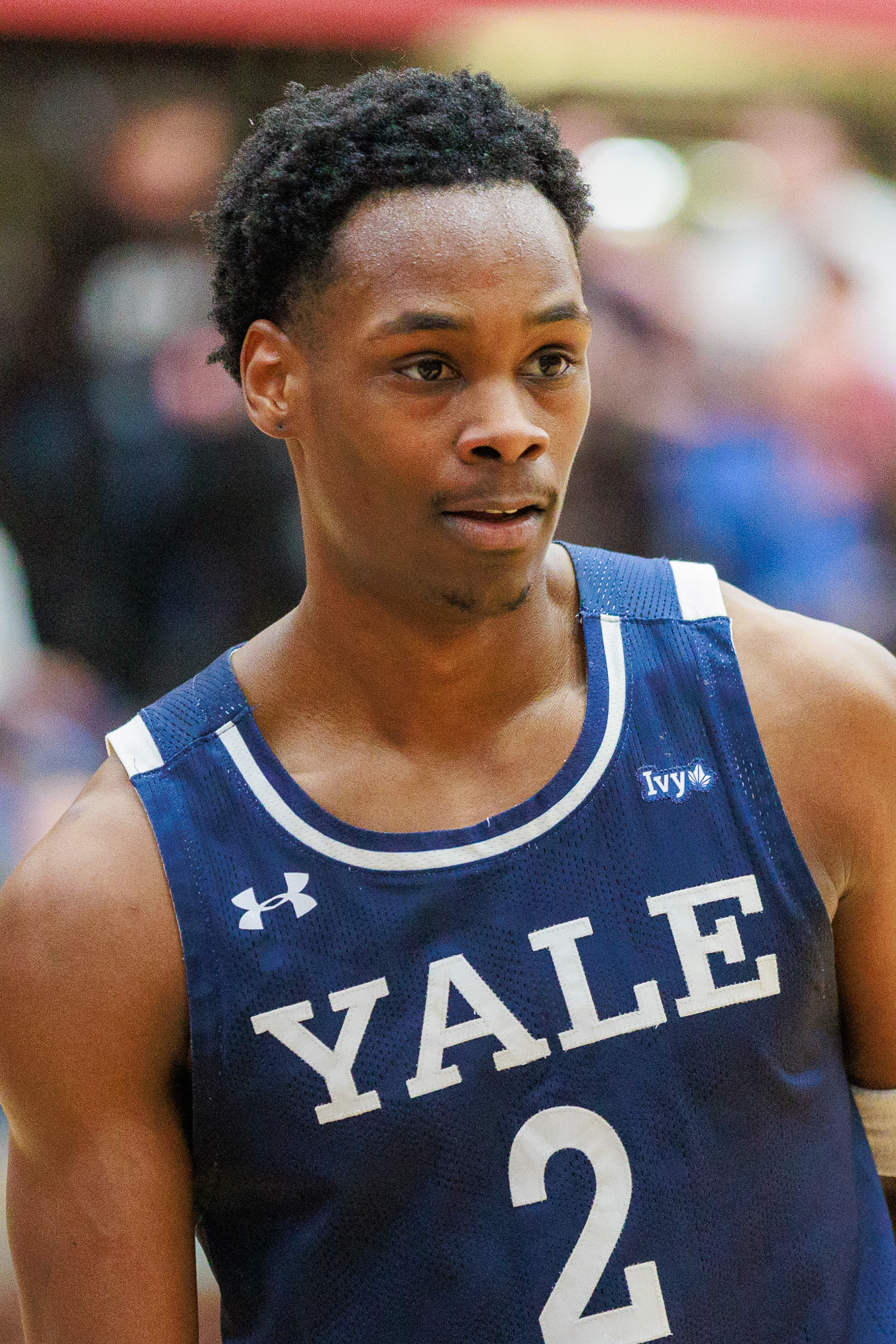
Bez Mbeng, Yale, 2025

Season	Player	School	Position	Class	Reference
1974–75	Ron Haigler	Penn	PF	Senior	
1975–76	Armond Hill	Princeton	PG	Senior	
1976–77	Frank Sowinski	Princeton	SF	Junior	
1977–78	Keven McDonald	Penn	SF	Senior	
1978–79	Tony Price	Penn	F	Senior	
1979–80	Peter Moss	Brown	F	Senior	
1980–81	Larry Lawrence	Dartmouth	SF	Senior	
1981–82^{†}	Paul Little	Penn	F	Junior	
1981–82^{†}	Craig Robinson	Princeton	F	Junior	
1982–83	Craig Robinson (2)	Princeton	F	Senior	
1983–84	Joe Carrabino	Harvard	SF	Junior	
1984–85	Ken Bantum	Cornell	C	Senior	
1985–86	Jim Turner	Brown	C	Senior	
1986–87	Perry Bromwell	Penn	G	Senior	
1987–88	Paul Maley	Yale	PF	Senior	
1988–89	Bob Scrabis	Princeton	SG / SF	Senior	
1989–90	Kit Mueller	Princeton	G	Junior	
1990–91	Kit Mueller (2)	Princeton	G	Senior	
1991–92	Sean Jackson	Princeton	SG	Senior	
1992–93^{†}	Jerome Allen	Penn	SG	Sophomore	
1992–93^{†}	Buck Jenkins	Columbia	SF	Senior	
1993–94	Jerome Allen (2)	Penn	SG	Junior	
1994–95	Matt Maloney	Penn	SG	Senior	
1995–96	Ira Bowman	Penn	G	Senior	
1996–97	Sydney Johnson	Princeton	G / F	Senior	
1997–98	Steve Goodrich	Princeton	C	Senior	
1998–99	Brian Earl	Princeton	SG	Senior	
1999–00	Michael-Hakim Jordan	Penn	PG	Senior	
2000–01	Craig Austin	Columbia	SF	Junior	
2001–02	Ugonna Onyekwe	Penn	PF	Junior	
2002–03	Ugonna Onyekwe (2)	Penn	PF	Senior	
2003–04	Jason Forte	Brown	PG	Junior	
2004–05	Tim Begley	Penn	SG	Senior	
2005–06	Ibrahim Jaaber	Penn	PG	Junior	
2006–07	Ibrahim Jaaber (2)	Penn	PG	Senior	
2007–08	Louis Dale	Cornell	PG	Sophomore	
2008–09	Alex Barnett	Dartmouth	SF	Senior	
2009–10	Ryan Wittman	Cornell	SF	Senior	
2010–11	Keith Wright	Harvard	PF	Junior	
2011–12	Zack Rosen	Penn	PG	Senior	
2012–13	Ian Hummer	Princeton	SF	Senior	
2013–14	Wesley Saunders	Harvard	SF	Junior	
2014–15	Justin Sears	Yale	SF	Junior	
2015–16	Justin Sears (2)	Yale	SF	Senior	
2016–17	Spencer Weisz	Princeton	F	Senior	
2017–18	Seth Towns	Harvard	F	Sophomore	
2018–19	Miye Oni	Yale	SG	Junior	
2019–20^{†}	Paul Atkinson	Yale	PF	Junior	
2019–20^{†}	A. J. Brodeur	Penn	PF	Senior	
2020–21	No Ivy League season held due to COVID-19 concerns				
2021–22	Tosan Evbuomwan	Princeton	SF	Junior	
2022–23	Jordan Dingle	Penn	SG	Junior	
2023–24	Caden Pierce	Princeton	SF	Sophomore	
2024–25	Bez Mbeng	Yale	PG	Senior	
2025–26	Nick Townsend	Yale	PF	Senior	

== Winners by school ==
School	Winners	Years
Penn	18	1975, 1978, 1979, 1982^{†}, 1987, 1993^{†}, 1994, 1995, 1996, 2000, 2002, 2003, 2005, 2006, 2007, 2012, 2020^{†}, 2023
Princeton	15	1976, 1977, 1982^{†}, 1983, 1989, 1990, 1991, 1992, 1997, 1998, 1999, 2013, 2017, 2022, 2024
Yale	7	1988, 2015, 2016, 2019, 2020^{†}, 2025, 2026
Harvard	4	1984, 2011, 2014, 2018
Brown	3	1980, 1986, 2004
Cornell	3	1985, 2008, 2010
Columbia	2	1993^{†}, 2001
Dartmouth	2	1981, 2009
