= Northland High School =

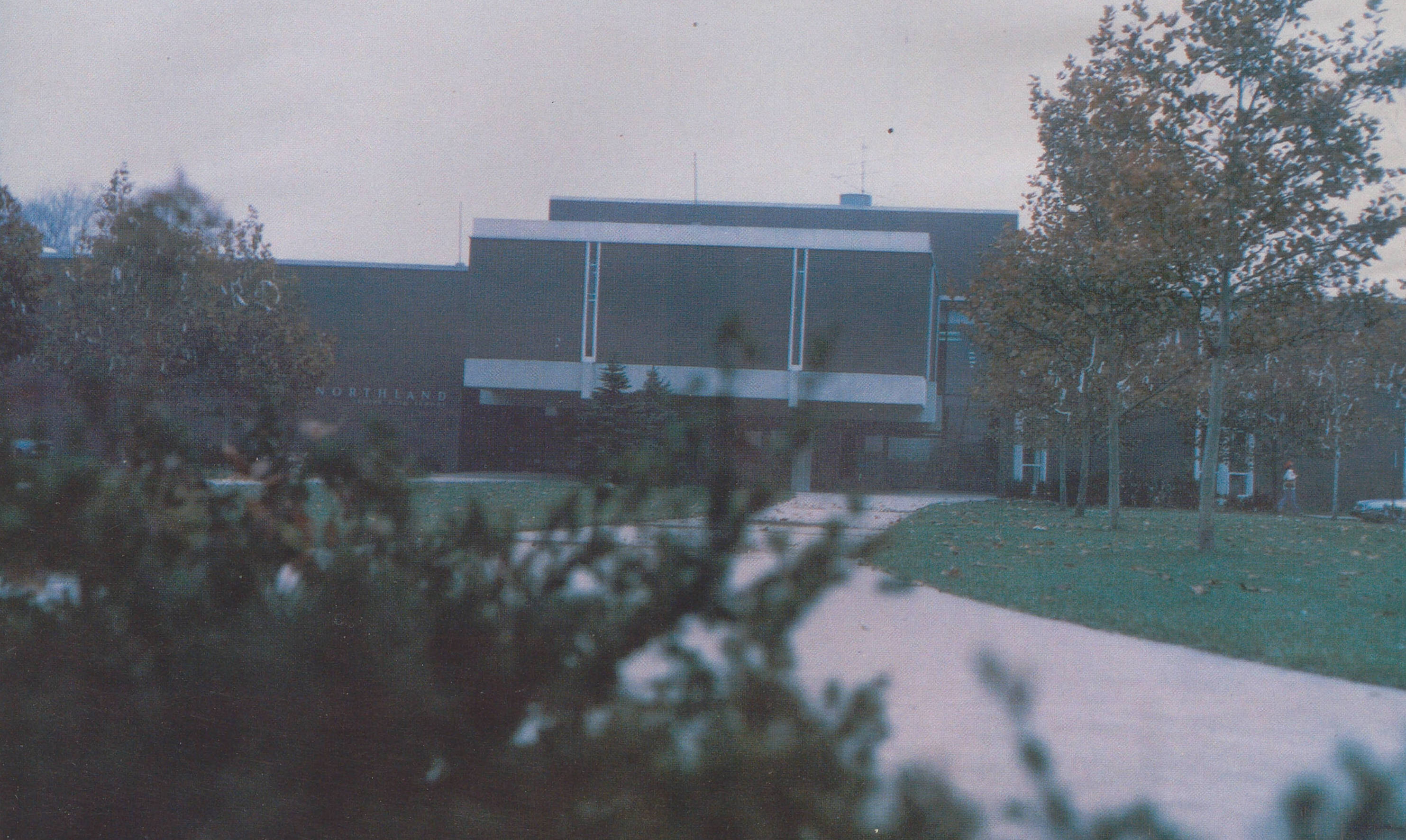
- Northland High School circa 1978

Location
- 1919 Northcliff Drive; Columbus, Ohio 43229; United States; 40°4′17″N 82°57′59″W

Information
- Type: Public
- Established: 1966
- Principal: Jason Johnson
- Teaching staff: 61.00 (FTE)
- Grades: 9-12
- Student to teacher ratio: 15.90
- Colors: Green and Gold
- Athletics conference: Columbus City League
- Team name: Vikings
- Rivals: Mifflin High School and Beechcroft High School
- Accreditation: North Central Association of Colleges and Schools
- Yearbook: Valhalla
- Website: www.columbus.k12.oh.us/Northland

Northland High School (NHS) is a public high school in Columbus, Ohio, United States, NHS is a part of the Columbus City Schools system and opened in 1966 The current principal is Jason Johnson and athletic teams are known as the Vikings with school colors of green and gold.

== State championships ==
- Girls basketball – 1982
- Boys basketball – 2009

== Notable alumni ==
- Jude Adjei-Barimah (2010), professional football player in the National Football League (NFL)
- Trey Burke (2011), professional basketball player in the National Basketball Association (NBA)
- Happy Chichester, singer, songwriter, and musician
- Fly Union, musical group
- Alexis Peterson (2013), WNBA player
- Devon Scott (2012), basketball player in the Korean Basketball League
- Doug Smith (1974), 6× Pro Bowl (1984–1989) American former professional football player who was a center and offensive guard for the Los Angeles Rams of the National Football League (NFL) from the 1978 through 1991
- Jared Sullinger (2010), professional basketball player in the NBA
- Pat Tiberi, Republican Representative for Ohio's 12th Congressional District, 2001-2018
- Seth Towns (2016), a basketball player for Harvard who won Ivy League Player of the Year
- Georgeann Wells (1982), first woman to register a dunk in an official NCAA intercollegiate basketball game
- Dwight Yoakam (1974), Grammy-winning country singer/songwriter; actor and filmmaker
