= Nick Townsend (basketball) =

American basketball player (born 2004)

No. 42 – Stanford Cardinal
- Position: Power forward
- League: Atlantic Coast Conference

Personal information
- Born: October 23, 2004 (age 22)
- Listed height: 6 ft 7 in (2.01 m)
- Listed weight: 240 lb (109 kg)

Career information
- High school: Horace Greeley (Chappaqua, New York); Hotchkiss School (Lakeville, Connecticut)
- College: Yale (2022–2026); Stanford (2026–present)

Career highlights
- Ivy League Player of the Year (2026); 2× First-team All-Ivy League (2025, 2026)

Nicholas Townsend (born October 23, 2004) is an American college basketball player for the Stanford Cardinal of the Atlantic Coast Conference (ACC). He previously played for the Yale Bulldogs.

== Early life and high school ==
Townsend grew up in Chappaqua, New York and initially attended Horace Greeley High School. In 2020, he received the "Mr. Basketball" award as the top basketball player in Section 1 of the New York State Public High School Athletic Association, the youngest player and first sophomore to earn that recognition. The New York State Sportswriters Association named Townsend to the Class AA all-state second team that year.

Townsend transferred to the Hotchkiss School to improve his chances of playing basketball during the COVID-19 pandemic. However, his junior season at the Hotchkiss School was cancelled due to the pandemic and Townsend missed his senior season due to injury.

== College career ==
=== Yale ===
During his first season with the Yale Bulldogs, Townsend appeared in 11 games off the bench. In his sophomore year, Townsend appeared in all 33 games and started 8 games, averaging 6.0 points and 3.9 rebounds. He was recognized with the team's Most Improved Player Award.

In his junior year, Townsend started in all 30 games, averaging 15.4 points (second on the team), 7.1 rebounds (first on the team), and 3.6 assists per game (second on the team). He scored 15 points in an 80-71 NCAA Tournament loss to Texas A&M. Townsend was one of five players named First Team All-Ivy.

Townsend was named captain of the team for the 2025-26 year. In his senior campaign, Townsend led the Yale Bulldogs in points (16.3), rebounds (7.4), assists (4.3), 3-point field goal percentage (46.3%), and steals (1.1). Yale Coach James Jones gave him the nickname "Twinkle Toes" inspired by his footwork on the court. He was named the 2025-26 Ivy League Men's Basketball Player of the Year. The National Association of Basketball Coaches (NABC) named Townsend as one of ten players to the 2025-26 Mid-Atlantic District First Team. His other senior year awards included All-ECAC Second Team honors, College Sports Communicators (CSC) Academic All-District, Second Team Academic All-American, and a selection to play in the Reese's Division I All-Star Game held at the NCAA Final Four.

Townsend and his teammates in the Class of 2026 set the Yale school record for most wins as a class, having won 89 games in four years.

After going undrafted in the 2026 NBA draft, Townsend joined the Philadelphia 76ers for the 2026 NBA Summer League.

On August 18, 2026, Townsend announced that he would be entering his name into the NCAA transfer portal while seeking a fifth year of collegiate eligibility.

=== Stanford ===
On August 25, 2026, Townsend announced that he would be transferring to Stanford.

== Career statistics ==
Legend
GP	Games played	GS	Games started	MPG	Minutes per game
FG%	Field goal percentage	3P%	3-point field goal percentage	FT%	Free throw percentage
RPG	Rebounds per game	APG	Assists per game	SPG	Steals per game
BPG	Blocks per game	PPG	Points per game	**Bold**	Career high

=== College ===
Year	Team	GP	GS	MPG	FG%	3P%	FT%	RPG	APG	SPG	BPG	PPG
2022–23	Yale	11	0	4.7	**.600**	.333	.429	1.3	.4	.3	.2	2.5
2023–24	Yale	**33**	8	17.8	.448	.296	**.796**	3.9	1.1	.4	.1	6.0
2024–25	Yale	30	**30**	30.5	.529	**.482**	.744	7.1	3.6	.8	**.2**	15.4
2025–26	Yale	30	**30**	**33.3**	.511	.463	.753	**7.4**	**4.3**	**1.1**	**.2**	**16.3**
Career		104	68	24.5	.508	.442	.750	5.6	2.7	.7	.2	11.3

== Personal life ==
Townsend's family includes many Ivy League athletes including his maternal grandfather Chet Boulris (football and baseball at Harvard), uncle Craig Boulris (baseball at Harvard), uncle Mark Boulris (football at Harvard), mother Lori Townsend (track and field at Harvard), sister Meaghan Townsend (track and field and crew at Harvard), and older brother Matt Townsend (basketball at Yale).
