= Jimmy Turner =

Jimmy Turner may refer to:

- Jimmy Turner (American football) (born 1959), American football defensive back
- Jimmie Turner (born 1962), American football linebacker
- Jimmy Turner (American soccer) (born 1989), American soccer player
- Jimmy Turner (English footballer) (1866–1903), English footballer

== See also ==
- Jim Turner (disambiguation)
- James Turner (disambiguation)
- Turner (surname)
