= Buck Jenkins =

American basketball coach and player

Personal information
- Born: February 15, 1971 (age 55) Philadelphia, Pennsylvania, U.S.
- Listed height: 6 ft 6 in (1.98 m)

Career information
- High school: Woodbridge (Woodbridge Township, New Jersey)
- College: Columbia (1989–1993)
- NBA draft: 1993: undrafted
- Position: Guard
- Coaching career: 1994–1997, 2010–present

Career history

Coaching
- 1994–1997: Columbia (assistant)
- 2010–present: Riverwood International Charter School

Career highlights
- Ivy League Co-Player of the Year (1993); 3× First-team All-Ivy League (1991–1993)

Leonard John "Buck" Jenkins (born February 15, 1971) is an American basketball coach and former professional player who is the head coach of the boys varsity team at the Riverwood International Charter School. He played college basketball for the Columbia Lions and is the program's all-time leading scorer.

== Playing career ==
Jenkins was born in Philadelphia, Pennsylvania. He attended Woodbridge High School in Woodbridge Township, New Jersey, where he is the school's all-time leading scorer.

Jenkins played for the Columbia Lions from 1989 to 1993. He was the Lions' leading scorer in his three final seasons and was named to the first-team All-Ivy League each time. Jenkins was selected as the Ivy League Men's Basketball Co-Player of the Year in 1993 alongside Jerome Allen of the Penn Quakers. He set a Lions record when he scored 47 points during a game against the Harvard Crimson on February 15, 1991. Jenkins' 1,767 career points are the most by a male Lions player. (Note: Jenkins held the overall Columbia basketball record until he was surpassed by Camille Zimmerman in 2018.) He was inducted into the Columbia Athletics Hall of Fame in 2008.

Jenkins played professionally in Europe for two seasons.

== Coaching career ==
On December 14, 1994, Jenkins returned to the Columbia Lions as an assistant coach. He spent two years in the position. Jenkins worked for the youth development program Inner Strength, Inc. in Georgia.

Jenkins served as the head coach of the boys junior varsity basketball team at Riverwood International Charter School from 2008 to 2010. He was promoted to the position of boys varsity basketball head coach in 2010.

Coach Jenkins was named Region Coach of the year for the 2023-24 basketball season. He was previously named Region Coach of the Year in 2016.

On Friday, March 8, 2024, Jenkins led the RICS Raiders to their first state championship over the defending 2023 state champions, Alexander High School (Douglasville, GA), by a score of 67-63 in overtime at the Macon (GA) Coliseum.

== Personal life ==
Jenkins' stepfather, Ron Cargill, played basketball at Southampton College (now Stony Brook Southampton). His cousin, Johnny Newman, played in the National Basketball Association (NBA).

Jenkins' son, Elijah, played college basketball for the Embry–Riddle Eagles, and has played professionally in Germany. His daughter, Nailah, played volleyball for the Northeastern Huskies, and played a fifth year as a graduate student for the Fordham Rams.
