= Seth Towns =

American basketball player and coach (born 1997)

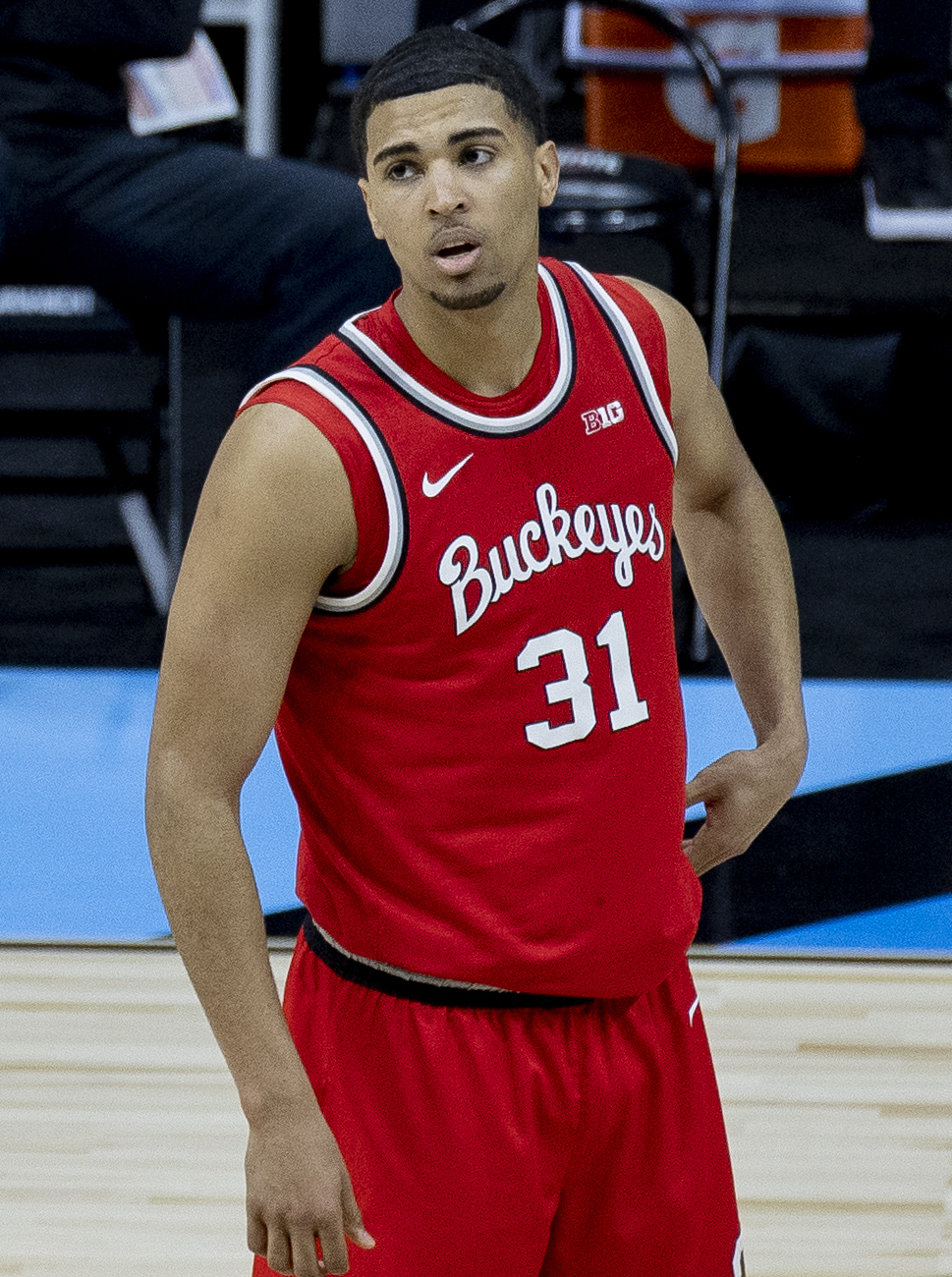
- Towns with Ohio State in 2021

Harvard Crimson
- Position: Assistant coach
- League: Ivy League

Personal information
- Born: November 5, 1997 (age 29) Columbus, Ohio, U.S.
- Listed height: 6 ft 9 in (2.06 m)
- Listed weight: 230 lb (104 kg)

Career information
- High school: Northland (Columbus, Ohio)
- College: Harvard (2016–2018); Ohio State (2020–2021); Howard (2023–2024)
- NBA draft: 2024: undrafted
- Coaching career: 2024–present

Career history

Coaching
- 2024–present: Harvard (assistant)

Career highlights
- As player: Ivy League Player of the Year (2018); First-team All-Ivy League (2018)

Seth Emmanuel Towns (born November 5, 1997) is an American basketball assistant coach for Harvard and former college basketball player. He played college basketball for the Harvard Crimson, the Ohio State Buckeyes, and the Howard Bison. He entered the 2023–24 NCAA Division I men's basketball season as an extremely rare eighth-year senior, but having only played in three seasons. Between injuries, a voluntary year away from the sport, and an NCAA blanket waiver granted to players active during the COVID-19 pandemic, Towns entered 2023–24 with up to two years of collegiate eligibility remaining. He previously played for the Harvard Crimson where he was the 2018 Ivy League Player of the Year as a sophomore, and then the Ohio State Buckeyes which saw him compete in just the 2020–21 season.

== Early life ==
Towns is from Columbus, Ohio and attended Northland High School. He was recruited to Harvard by coach Tommy Amaker, who told him a Harvard degree would give him a platform that went beyond basketball and that he would be crazy not to come to Harvard.

On June 15, 2015, Towns committed to play college basketball for Harvard over Ohio State and Michigan.

== College career ==
Towns led the Crimson in scoring with 15.8 points per game as a sophomore while also contributing 5.4 rebounds and 1.8 assists per game. He shot 49.3 percent of his three-point attempts in Ivy League play and led Harvard to a share of the regular season championship. At the conclusion of the regular season Towns was named Ivy League Player of the Year, becoming the third sophomore to receive the honor. He scored 24 points and 12 rebounds in the Ivy League semifinal versus Cornell.

On November 3, 2018, it was announced that Towns was out indefinitely with a knee injury. Towns would miss his junior season.

On December 23, 2019, it was announced that Towns would undergo a season ending surgery, ending his tenure at Harvard. On March 21, 2020, he decided to transfer to Ohio State, choosing the Buckeyes over Duke. Towns was detained by police at a protest on May 29. He was involved in a car accident on November 25, and missed the game against Illinois State. Towns averaged 3.8 points and 2.2 rebounds per game during the 2020–21 season. He underwent back surgery in September 2021 and was expected to miss several months.

On September 4, 2022, Towns announced that he was stepping away from basketball. He took the 2022–23 season off before announcing on May 15, 2023, that he was returning and intending to transfer out of Ohio State. The announcement would make him an eighth-year redshirt senior in 2023–24. On May 21, he committed to Howard University.

== Coaching career ==
After going undrafted in the 2024 NBA draft, Towns was hired as an assistant coach by Harvard.

== Career statistics ==
Legend
GP	Games played	GS	Games started	MPG	Minutes per game
FG%	Field goal percentage	3P%	3-point field goal percentage	FT%	Free throw percentage
RPG	Rebounds per game	APG	Assists per game	SPG	Steals per game
BPG	Blocks per game	PPG	Points per game	**Bold**	Career high

=== College ===
Year	Team	GP	GS	MPG	FG%	3P%	FT%	RPG	APG	SPG	BPG	PPG
2016–17	Harvard	28	20	24.6	**.428**	.388	.821	4.4	1.3	**1.0**	.5	12.3
2017–18	Harvard	30	24	27.9	.419	**.441**	.805	5.7	1.8	.8	**.6**	**16.0**
2018–19	Harvard	Injured										
2019–20	Harvard	Injured										
2020–21	Ohio State	25	0	10.8	.421	.341	.800	2.2	.3	.2	.2	3.8
2021–22	Ohio State	Injured										
2022–23	Sat out											
2023–24	Howard	**32**	**29**	**32.4**	.368	.347	**.842**	**6.5**	**2.5**	**1.0**	.4	14.2
Career		115	73	24.6	.405	.383	.823	4.8	1.5	.8	.5	12.0
