= Kenny Noland =

American basketball player (born 2002)

No. 2 – Michigan Wolverines
- Position: Point guard
- Conference: Big Ten Conference

Personal information
- Born: December 12, 2002 (age 23) Rio Rancho, New Mexico, U.S.
- Listed height: 6 ft 2 in (1.88 m)
- Listed weight: 185 lb (84 kg)

Career information
- High school: Apex Friendship (Apex, North Carolina); Hotchkiss (Lakeville, Connecticut)
- College: Columbia (2022–2026); Michigan (2026–present)

Career highlights
- Second-team All-Ivy League (2026)

Kenny Salih Noland (born December 12, 2002) is an American college basketball player for the Michigan Wolverines of the Big Ten Conference. He previously played for the Columbia Lions.

== Early life ==
Noland was born in Rio Rancho, New Mexico on December 12, 2002, the son of Marla Peter. He has four siblings, Sarah, Sophia, Jimmy and Ezra. As a youth, he partook in card games, snowboarding, golf and ping pong. Noland first attended Apex Friendship High School in North Carolina, where he played for six seasons (7th—12th grade). As a senior, he was a first-team All-State selection, averaging 23.6 points, 4.1 rebounds, and 3.5 assists per game. After which, he attended The Hotchkiss School in Lakeville, Connecticut for a post-graduate year, averaging 18.1 points, 7.3 rebounds, 7.5 assists and 3.0 steals per game and was the New England Prep School Athletic Conference Class A Player of the Year. Noland committed to Columbia over offers from Eastern Kentucky, Northern Colorado, UNC Asheville, Lafayette, Massachusetts, Army, Navy, Dartmouth, and Fairfield.

== College career ==
In 2022, Noland enrolled at Columbia University. He played four seasons and finished 10th all-time in career assists (283), and fifth in career steals (125). As a senior, Noland was a second-team All-Ivy League selection after averaging 17.1 points per game. He also ranked fifth among 2025–26 NCAA statistical leaders in free throw percentage at 92.1%. On January 24, 2026, Noland scored a career-high 28 points against Dartmouth.

After the NCAA changed the eligibility from four years to five years, Noland transferred to the University of Michigan for his final season and filed a lawsuit against the NCAA. First he filed in North Carolina, before voluntarily withdrawing the case and refiling the collective lawsuit in Indiana. On September 23, Noland was granted a preliminary injunction by an Indiana judge and gained eligibility for the 2026–27 season. When Noland posted 11 points on 4–5 shooting on November 15 against William & Mary, it contributed to the team's all-time record 75-point half and record 8 double-digit scorers.

== Professional career ==
In July 2026, Noland signed a professional contract in Germany with the Artland Dragons, before ultimately deciding to return to college for a final season.

== See also ==
- Columbia Lions men's basketball statistical leaders
