= Paul Little (basketball) =

American basketball player

Personal information
- Born: 1960s
- Listed height: 6 ft 5 in (1.96 m)

Career information
- High school: Boston Latin School (Boston, Massachusetts)
- College: Penn (1979–1983)
- NBA draft: 1983: 7th round, 154th overall pick
- Drafted by: Portland Trail Blazers
- Position: Forward

Career history
- 1986: New Jersey Jammers

Career highlights
- AP honorable mention All-American (1982); Ivy League co-Player of the Year (1982); First-team All-Ivy League (1982); 3× Second-team All-Ivy League (1980, 1981, 1983); Ivy League Rookie of the Year (1980)
- Stats at Basketball Reference

Paul Little (born 1960s) is an American former college basketball player who earned many accolades during his time at the University of Pennsylvania (Penn), including being named the Ivy League co-Player of the Year in 1982. As of October 2025, Little is the Chief Operating Officer of Protecdiv, an insurance technology company.

== Playing career ==
=== High school ===
Little grew up in Massachusetts and attended Boston Latin School, a public exam school in Boston. He starred for the basketball team, where as a senior in 1978–79 he averaged 24 points and 16 rebounds per game, led them to the Boston City League championship, and was named the most valuable player (MVP) of the league.

=== College ===
Little enrolled at Penn in 1979–80 to play for the Quakers. He made an immediate impact: Little averaged 9.8 points and 5.1 rebounds per game and helped lead Penn to an Ivy League regular season championship. He was named to the All-Ivy League Second Team and also tabbed the Ivy League Rookie of the Year. He followed his freshman season up with a strong sophomore campaign which saw him repeat as an All-Ivy Second Team selection, although the Quakers finished in second place in conference standings.

As a junior, Little averaged 11.6 points, 5.3 rebounds, 2.6 assists, and 1.9 steals per game. Penn won their second Ivy League regular season championship in three years. Little was named to the All-Ivy League First Team, and was honored as the Ivy League co-Player of the Year with Princeton's Craig Robinson. He was also tabbed by the Associated Press as an honorable mention NCAA All-American.

In his fourth and final collegiate season in 1982–83, Penn finished second in the Ivy League, but Little garnered a postseason honor by being named to the All-Ivy League Second Team after averaging 12.6 points and 5.7 rebounds per game. He became the first play in University of Pennsylvania history to be named to four all-conference teams. In 104 career games, Little scored 1,116 points and grabbed 577 rebounds.

=== Professional ===
Little was selected in the 1983 NBA draft by the Portland Trail Blazers in the seventh round (154th overall). In October 1983 the Trail Blazers waived him. Little played for the United States Basketball League's New Jersey Jammers for their 1986 season.

== Later life ==
Since 1985, Little has been in the P&C (re)insurance industry. He had a 20+ year career at Guy Carpenter (a subsidiary of Marsh & McLennan), served at President of EQECAT (now Corelogic), and CEO of Ultimate Risk Solutions. As of October 2025, he serves at Protecdiv's Chief Operating Officer, and also serving on Accelerant's board of directors since 2021.
