= Tony Price (basketball) =

American basketball player

Personal information
- Born: January 5, 1957 (age 69) New York City, New York, U.S.
- Listed height: 6 ft 6 in (1.98 m)
- Listed weight: 190 lb (86 kg)

Career information
- High school: William Howard Taft (Bronx, New York)
- College: Penn (1976–1979)
- NBA draft: 1979: 2nd round, 29th overall pick
- Drafted by: Detroit Pistons
- Position: Shooting guard
- Number: 34

Career history
- 1980: San Diego Clippers

Career highlights
- Ivy League Player of the Year (1979); First-team All-Ivy League (1979); Second-team All-Ivy League (1978); Robert V. Geasey Trophy co-winner (1979)
- Stats at NBA.com
- Stats at Basketball Reference

Anthony Price (born January 5, 1957) is an American former professional basketball player who played in the National Basketball Association (NBA). Price attended the University of Pennsylvania where he was a standout basketball player. In his senior season, Price won the Ivy League Player of the Year award after averaging 19.8 points per game and 8.7 rebounds per game. He helped the Penn team advance to the 1979 NCAA Tournament and eventually into the Final Four for the first time in school history. Tony was the top scorer of the tournament with 142 points and earned a spot on the 1979 All-East Regional team.

Price was then drafted with the seventh pick in the second round of the 1979 NBA draft by the Detroit Pistons. He was waived by the Pistons before playing a single game for them. Price did end up being signed by the San Diego Clippers who he played five games for in the 1980-81 NBA season. In those five games, Price averaged 0.8 points per game and 0.6 assists per game.

Tony Price is also the father of NBA player A. J. Price.

== Career statistics ==
Legend
GP	Games played	GS	Games started	MPG	Minutes per game
FG%	Field goal percentage	3P%	3-point field goal percentage	FT%	Free throw percentage
RPG	Rebounds per game	APG	Assists per game	SPG	Steals per game
BPG	Blocks per game	PPG	Points per game	**Bold**	Career high

=== NBA ===
==== Regular season ====
Year	Team	GP	MPG	FG%	3P%	FT%	RPG	APG	SPG	BPG	PPG
1980–81	San Diego	5	5.8	.286	–	–	.0	.6	.4	.2	.8
