= Alex Barnett (basketball) =

American basketball player (born 1986)

Personal information
- Born: November 21, 1986 (age 39) St. Louis, Missouri, U.S.
- Listed height: 6 ft 6 in (1.98 m)
- Listed weight: 210 lb (95 kg)

Career information
- High school: Cardinal Ritter (St. Louis, Missouri)
- College: Dartmouth (2005–2009)
- NBA draft: 2009: undrafted
- Playing career: 2009–2010
- Position: Small forward

Career history
- 2009: Cholet
- 2009: Nantes
- 2009–2010: FoKoPo

Career highlights
- AP honorable mention All-American (2009); Ivy League Player of the Year (2009); First-team All-Ivy League (2009)

Alexander Barnett (born November 21, 1986) is an American former basketball player, best known for his college career at Dartmouth College, where he was the 2009 Ivy League Player of the Year.

A 6'6" small forward, Barnett was recruited to Dartmouth from Cardinal Ritter College Prep High School in St. Louis, Missouri. He was a three-year starter for the Big Green, increasing his scoring average in each of his four college seasons. As a senior, Barnett averaged 19.4 points per game and was named the Ivy League Player of the Year and an honorable mention All-American by the Associated Press.

Following the close of his college career, Barnett signed with Cholet Basket of the French LNB Pro A. He played for three clubs in his one professional season, also suiting up for Nantes in LNB Pro B and in Finland for FoKoPo.
