= Craig Austin =

American basketball player (born 1979)

Personal information
- Born: November 1, 1979 (age 47)
- Listed height: 6 ft 6 in (1.98 m)
- Listed weight: 210 lb (95 kg)

Career information
- High school: Saint Francis (Athol Springs, New York)
- College: Columbia (1998–2002)
- NBA draft: 2002: undrafted
- Position: Small forward

Career highlights
- Ivy League Player of the Year (2001); 2× First-team All-Ivy League (2000, 2001); Second-team All-Ivy League (2002)

Craig J. Austin (born November 1, 1979) is an American former basketball player. He played college basketball for the Columbia Lions and was the Ivy League Player of the Year as a junior in 2001.

Austin is a native of Buffalo, New York, and attended Saint Francis High School in Athol Springs, New York. He joined the Lions in 1998 and started several games as a freshman. Austin was selected to the All-Ivy League first-team for the 1999–2000 season.

Austin averaged 18.4 points per game during the 2000–01 season; he was the only Lions player to average double figures and nearly doubled the point total of the second highest scorer on the team. He led the Ivy League in made free throws and ranked second in points scored that season. Austin was selected as the Ivy League Player of the Year and earned a second consecutive nomination to the All-Ivy League first-team in 2001. Austin was named to the All-Ivy League second-team during his senior season in 2001–02 after he averaged 16 points and 5.4 rebounds per game.

Austin tried out for the Westchester Wildfire of the United States Basketball League (USBL) in 2002.

Austin graduated from the University at Buffalo School of Law in 2008 and was inducted into the Saint Francis High School Hall of Fame the same year.
