= James Alfred Turner =

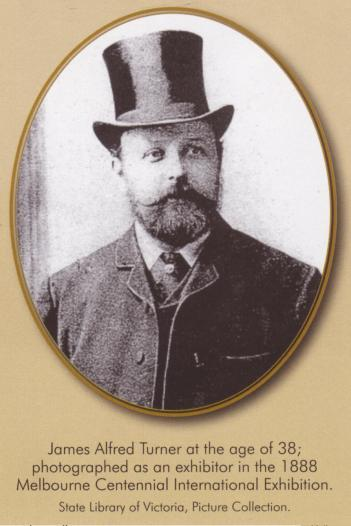
- James Alfred Turner portrait
- Born: James Alfred Turner; 11 February 1850; Yorkshire, England
- Died: 13 April 1908; Victoria, Australia
- Known for: Painting

James Alfred Turner (J. A. Turner, 1850–1908) was an Australian painter. Turner recorded in painstaking detail the life and daily pursuits of the small rural settler in the mountain ranges to the north and north east of Melbourne, the capital of the State of Victoria, Australia. At the time this was “battlers country”, life was hard and pleasures simple.

Photography existed during Turner’s lifetime; however, contemporary photographic technology had limited capacity to record aspects of atmosphere and social context that his paintings sought to convey. He painted in great detail and his pictures provide vibrant studies of daily life.

Turner was quite prolific and his style instantly recognisable. Like Turner'sill who became famous for his paintings of life on the Victorian Goldfields, Turner seems to have set out to record a specific facet of Victorian life. He painted mainly rural scenes and recorded faithfully the typical rural "situations" of the day. He signed almost all his paintings J.A.Turner or in the case of small works J.A.T.

Turner died just over 100 years ago. Art contemporaries and critics of the time were not kind. He was referred to, by some, as an illustrator. His critical contemporaries, so obsessed by the impressionist "flavour of the day" looked only at his style as an artist and commonly missed what he was trying to achieve - a unique window on Australian pioneering history.

== Biography ==
Born: 11 February 1850, Bradford, Yorkshire, England
Died: 13 April 1908, Faversham Road, Canterbury, Melbourne, Victoria, Australia

JAMES ALFRED TURNER, artist, was born the son of John Turner, bank accountant, and his wife Rhoda, née Oddy. He arrived in Victoria some time before 1874, the year of his earliest-known Australian painting, 'View down Collins Street from Spring Street'. The majority of his work is dated between 1884 and 1907. In 1884 James Oddie commissioned him to execute fourteen paintings of bush life which Oddie donated to the newly founded Ballarat Fine Art Gallery.

Turner had several Melbourne addresses: at William Street in the 1870s and at least two in Collins Street in the 1880s. In 1888 he bought a twenty-acre (8 ha) bushland property with a small dwelling ('The Gables') at Kilsyth, near Croydon, at the foot of the Dandenong Ranges.

Turner married (firstly) Annie Margaret Williams on 29 October 1890 at St Peter's Church, East Melbourne, they lived at Hawthorn. She died in the following year after the birth of a stillborn child. Turner returned to Kilsyth in 1893 and remained there until 1907. On 1 May 1900 he married Mary Ann Thomas (d.1950), daughter of the founder of Thomastown, at the Government Statist's Office, Melbourne.

Turner died suddenly of heart disease on 13 April 1908 at Canterbury and was buried with Anglican rites in Box Hill cemetery. He had no children.
His obituary (The Argus (Melbourne) 16 April 1908 page 7) states … "Victoria loses an artist who not only understood and appreciated the beauty of the bush, but could depict faithfully its life and character. He was, as a rule, content with small canvasses, homely incidents and quiet aspects of nature. At times he was exceedingly happy in his landscapes and would often touch a very high if not inspired note. No man ever painted the realisms of a forest fire and its fighting better than he, or with more absolute truth. He was a very conscientious man, painting chiefly to please himself, without any suspicion of pot-boiling, never allowing work to leave his hands until he was thoroughly satisfied."

Local rural and bush life supplied subjects for his paintings which Table Talk Magazine described as being of 'peculiar exactness'. He was recognized in 1894 as 'our best known painter of incident'. A prolific painter, Turner was a master of oil and water-colour. Most of his works are ‘Oil on Canvas’ or ‘Oil on canvas laid down on board’. There are a number of paired works done in Oil on circular tinplate "disks". He also worked in gouache.

He sometimes painted large works such as 'The Homestead Saved' (90 cm by 151 cm) which sold for $82,000 in 1980. The Age (Melbourne)30 May 1980. Cole-Adams, Peter. Gippsland fire painting brings $82,000. Sale of 'The Homestead saved'.

In 1888 his paintings 'Saved' and 'Fighting for Home' received 3rd awards of merit in the Melbourne Centennial (International) Exhibition. The Age (Melbourne). 7 November 1985 p. 19. Maslan, Geoff. Oil painting by Australia's own Turner sells for $320 000. Sale of 'Fighting for home'.

Turner was an exhibiting member of the Victorian Artists' Society, the Australian Art Association, the Victorian Academy of Arts, the Yarra Sculptors' Society, the Melbourne Art Club and New Melbourne Art Club.
The State Library of Victoria artists biography index lists exhibitions in which he showed and brief details of the various works.
A summary of the index is ....
Exhibited Yarra Sculptors Society - 1898, 1901–02, 1902, 1906, 1908
Exhibited Victorian Artists Society - March.October.November 1890
Exhibited Victorian Academy of Arts - 1884-85, 1887
Exhibited New Melbourne Art Club 1894
Exhibited Melbourne Art Club 1897

The first of his paintings to be reproduced on postcards was published in Melbourne about 1904. It proved popular and forty-six of his rural and bush-life works were issued in colour. No other colonial painter's work was published in such volume and Turner postcards are still sought by collectors.

Postcards of settler life among battler's country from original works by J. A. Turner.
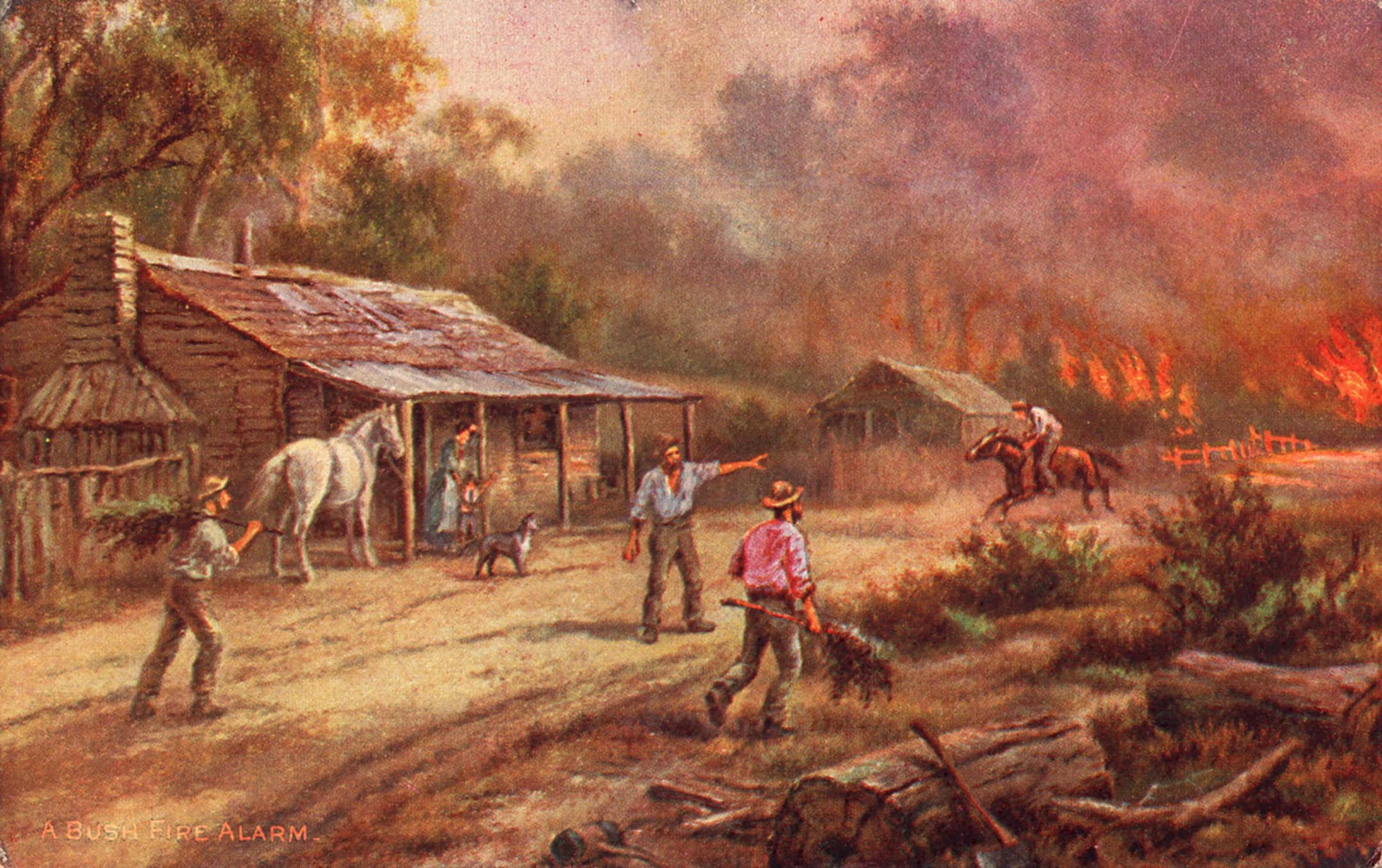
A Bushfire Alarm

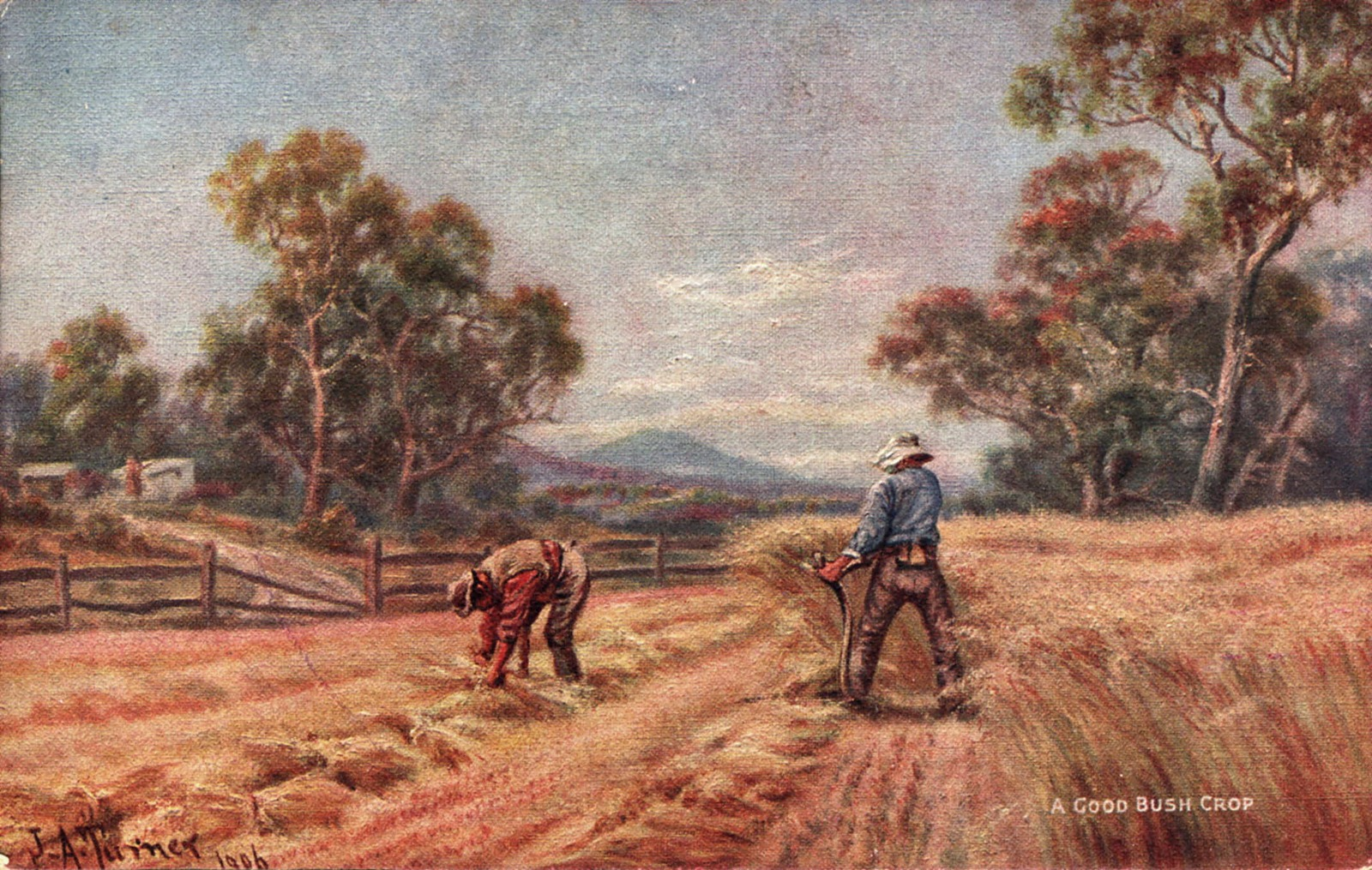
A Good Bush Crop

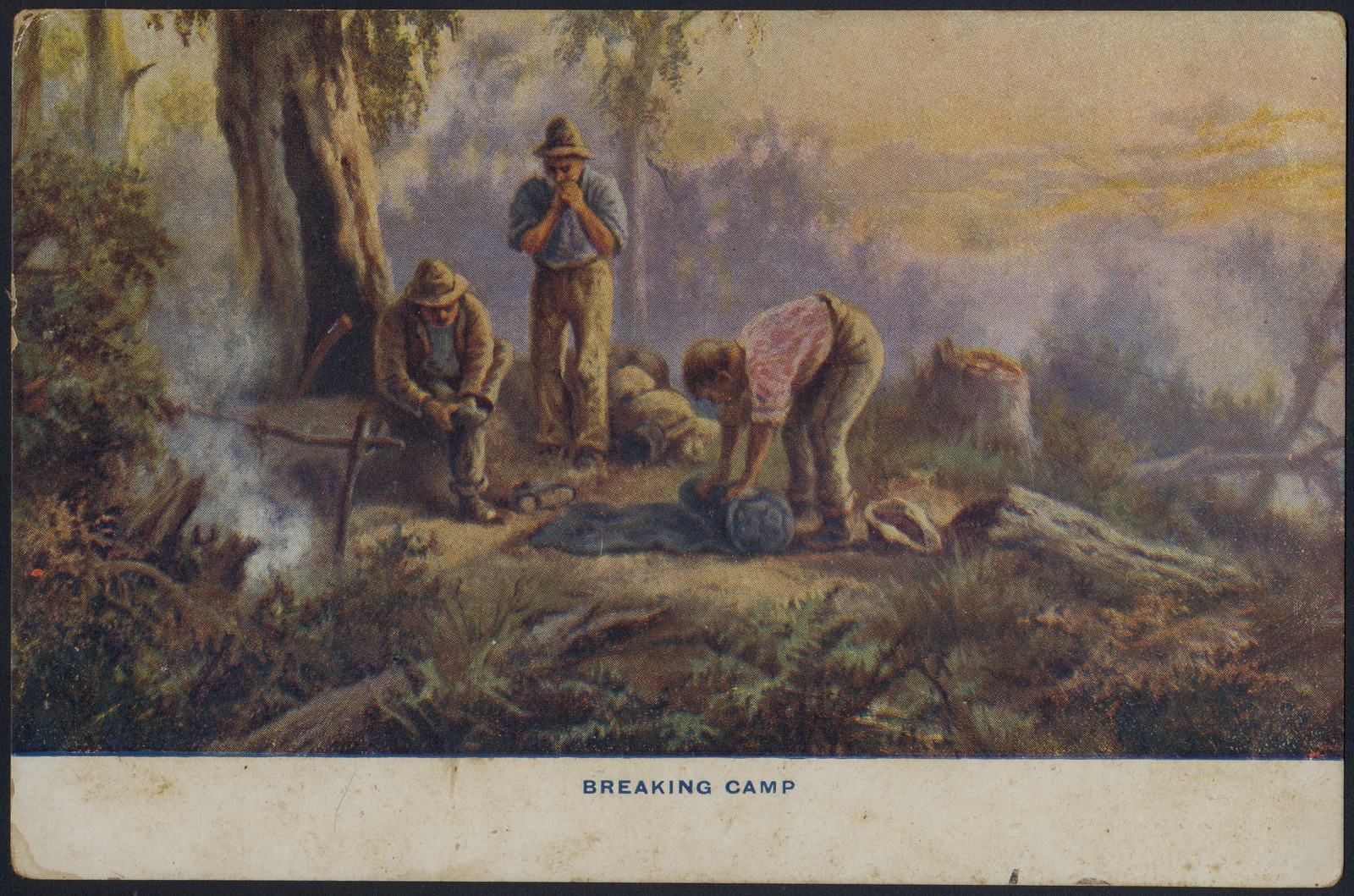
Breaking Camp

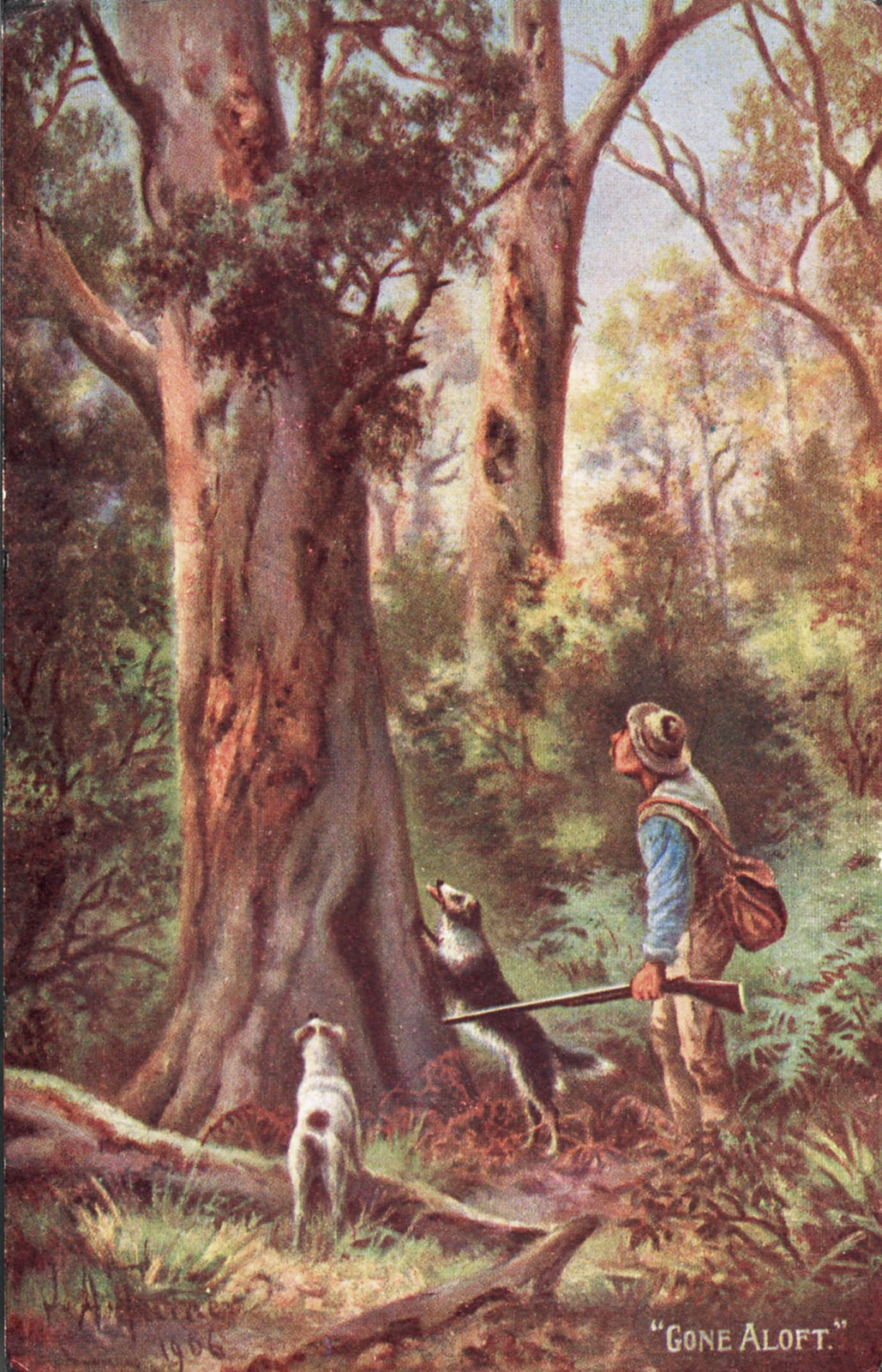
Gone Aloft

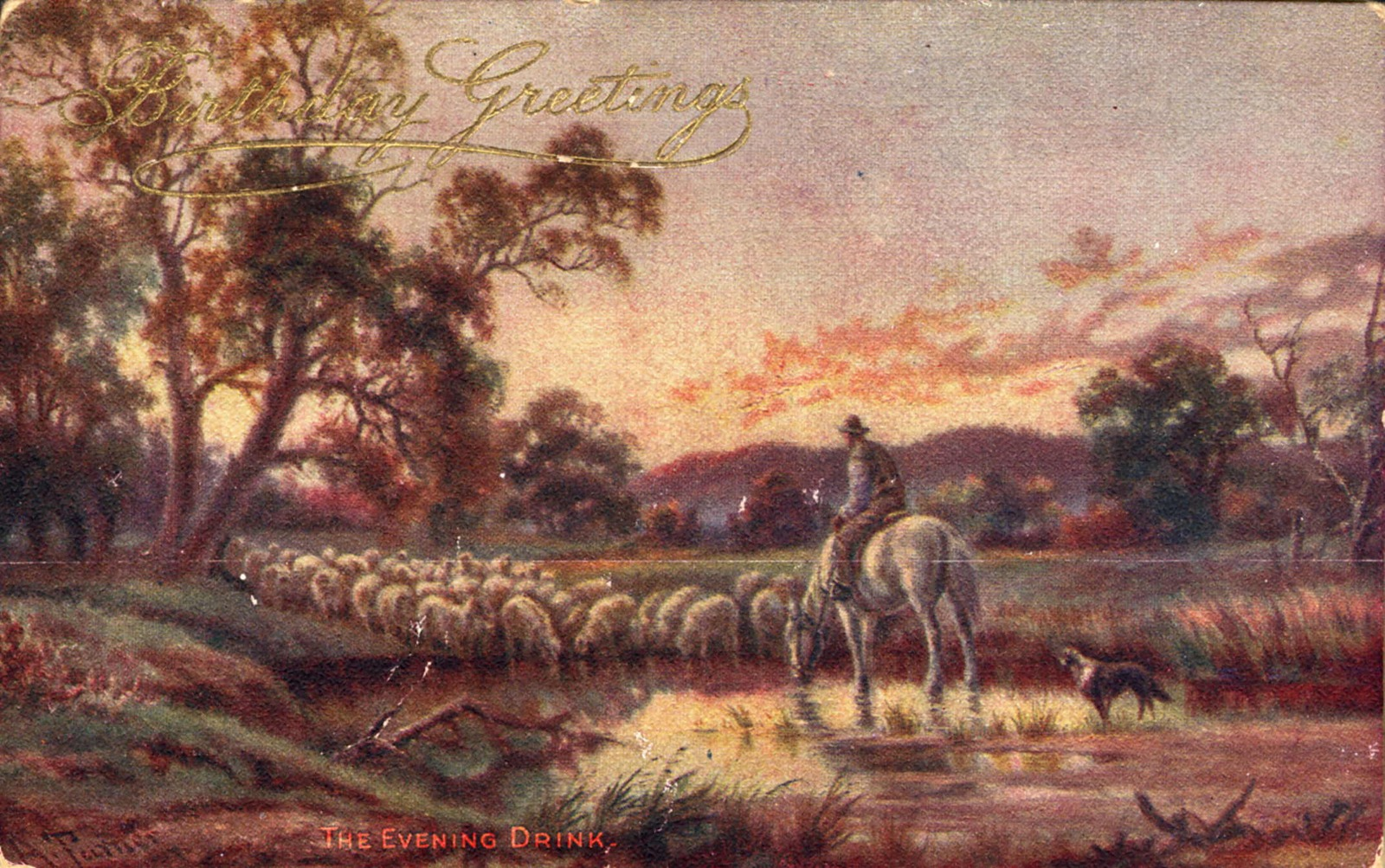
The Evening Drink
Images courtesy of James Alfred Turner collection , State Library Victoria

== Select bibliography ==
Table Talk, 21 Nov 1901; Argus (Melbourne), 8 May 1890, 16 Apr 1908;
Australian Financial Review, 15 Nov 1973.

Shirley C. Jones. "Turner, James Alfred (1850–1908)", Australian Dictionary of Biography, Volume 12, Melbourne University Press, 1990, p. 296.

Shirley C. Jones, "JA Turner: an elusive colonial painter" This Australia (Winter 1988 p 86-88). She outlines her research into Turner and in particular his artwork appearing on postcards. This Australia is held by both the State Library of Queensland & State Library of NSW .
