= Jim Turner (basketball) =

American basketball player

Personal information
- Born: Levittown, New York, U.S.
- Listed height: 6 ft 9 in (2.06 m)

Career information
- High school: Sewanhaka (Floral Park, New York)
- College: Brown (1982–1986)
- NBA draft: 1986: undrafted
- Position: Center

Career highlights
- Ivy League Player of the Year (1986); First-team All-Ivy League (1986)

Jim Turner is an American former basketball player. He played college basketball for the Brown Bears and was selected as the Ivy League Player of the Year in 1986. Turner did not play basketball professionally and instead pursued a career in the financial sector.

== Early life ==
Turner is a native of Levittown, New York. He attended Sewanhaka High School in Long Island and was selected as the valedictorian of his graduating class.

== College career ==
Turner chose to attend Brown University because he wanted to play at an Ivy League school to achieve his educational goals and also play against top athletic competition. He emerged as the leading player for the Bears during his senior season and averaged 24.0 points per game during Ivy League games. He led the Bears to their first Ivy League championship in 1986 and earned the team a berth in the NCAA Division I tournament. Turner was selected as the Ivy League Player of the Year and was a unanimous first-team all-league selection in 1986.

Turner holds program records for career field goal percentage (.602%), season field goal percentage (.628% in 1985–86) and game field goal percentage (.933%).

Turner graduated magna cum laude with a Bachelor of Science in Applied Math / Economics. He was selected as an Academic All-American. Turner reflected on his professional basketball prospects in a 2011 interview: "It was clear that no one on our team was going to the NBA. Myself and several others went on to earn MBAs. A couple of guys became doctors. But no one was going to the NBA."

== Finance career ==
Turner was offered a job interview at Lehman Brothers after his Bears basketball career ended in 1986, and spent two years with the company as an investment banking analyst. He attended the Fuqua School of Business at Duke University and attained a Master of Business Administration in 1990. Turner returned to Lehman Brothers after his graduation and worked there for another five years. He then had stints at UBS Securities, Citicorp Securities and Bear Stearns.

Turner was hired by BNP Paribas in 2000. He was promoted to the head of their debt capital markets business in 2002 and held the position until his retirement in 2016. Turner advised Fortune 500 companies on how to access debt markets, and was responsible for bringing companies such as IBM and The Walt Disney Company to the bond market.

== Personal life ==
Turner lives in Spring Lake, New Jersey, with his wife and has four children. His daughters, Jillian and Kelsey, were members of the track and field and cross country teams at Brown University.
