= Jock Turner (Australian footballer) =

Australian rules footballer

Personal information
- Full name: Jock Turner
- Born: 3 March 1909
- Died: 7 March 1935 (aged 26)

Playing career^{1}
Years	Club	Games (Goals)
1930	Essendon	1 (2)
- ^{1} Playing statistics correct to the end of 1930.

Jock Turner (3 March 1909 – 7 March 1935) was an Australian rules footballer who played with Essendon in the Victorian Football League (VFL). He was killed in a motorcycle accident in Yallourn.
