= Penn Quakers men's basketball =

College men's basketball team representing the University of Pennsylvania

2026–27 Penn Quakers men's basketball team
- University: University of Pennsylvania
- Head coach: Fran McCaffery (2nd season)
- Location: Philadelphia, Pennsylvania
- Arena: Palestra (capacity: 8,722)
- Conference: Ivy League
- Nickname: Quakers
- Colors: Red and blue
- Student section: Red & Blue Crew

NCAA Division I tournament Final Four
- 1979
Other NCAA Division I tournament results
Elite Eight	1971, 1972, 1979
Sweet Sixteen	1953, 1971, 1972, 1973, 1978, 1979
Appearances	1953, 1970, 1971, 1972, 1973, 1974, 1975, 1978, 1979, 1980, 1982, 1985, 1987, 1993, 1994, 1995, 1999, 2000, 2002, 2003, 2005, 2006, 2007, 2018, 2026

Pre-tournament Helms national champions
- 1920, 1921

Conference tournament champions
- 2018, 2026

Conference regular-season champions
- 1906, 1908, 1916, 1918, 1920, 1921, 1928, 1929, 1934, 1935, 1937, 1945, 1953, 1966, 1970, 1971, 1972, 1973, 1974, 1975, 1978, 1979, 1980, 1982, 1985, 1987, 1993, 1994, 1995, 1996, 1999, 2000, 2002, 2003, 2005, 2006, 2007, 2018

Uniforms
Home	Away

The Penn Quakers men's basketball team is the college basketball program representing the University of Pennsylvania. The team from Penn is a member of the winningest programs in NCAA Division I history and is currently the twenty-fourth winningest men's basketball program of all-time. Penn plays in the Ivy League.

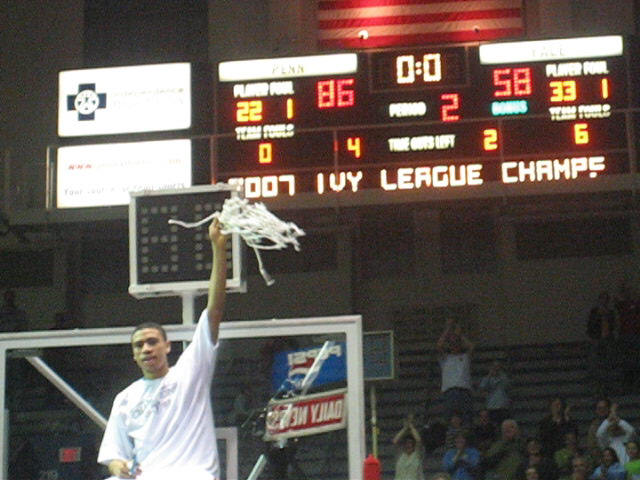
Penn senior Ibby Jaaber holds the net, which he cut from the rim, after Penn defeated Yale 86–58 on March 2, 2007, at The Palestra (which win clinched the 2006–07 Ivy League championship and Penn's 25th Ivy crown).

Prior to the formation of the Ivy League in 1956 Penn was a member of the Eastern Intercollegiate Basketball League (EIBL) from 1903 through 1955. Penn won 13 EIBL championships (1906, 1908, 1916, 1918, 1920, 1921, 1928, 1929, 1934, 1935, 1937, 1945, 1953). Penn was retroactively selected as the pre-NCAA tournament national champion for the 1919–20 and 1920–21 seasons by the Helms Athletic Foundation, and the 1919–20 team was retroactively ranked as the top team of the season the Premo-Porretta Power Poll.

Penn has appeared in one Final Four, in 1979. Penn and Princeton are tied for the most Ivy League regular season championships with 26 each. Their main Ivy League rivalry is with Princeton, whom they used to always play as the last regular season game. Combining the EIL and Ivy Championships Penn leads with 39 championships; Princeton 32; Columbia 14; Yale 13; Dartmouth 12; Cornell 8; Harvard 6; and Brown 1.

The last NCAA tournament victory for the Quakers came on March 17, 1994, at the Nassau Veterans Memorial Coliseum in Uniondale, New York. The No. 11 Quakers defeated the No. 6 Nebraska Cornhuskers, 90–80, in the first round. The Quakers then fell in the second round to No. 3 Florida on March 19 as the Gators prevailed, 70–58.

== Notable seasons ==
=== 1920 & 1921 National Championships ===
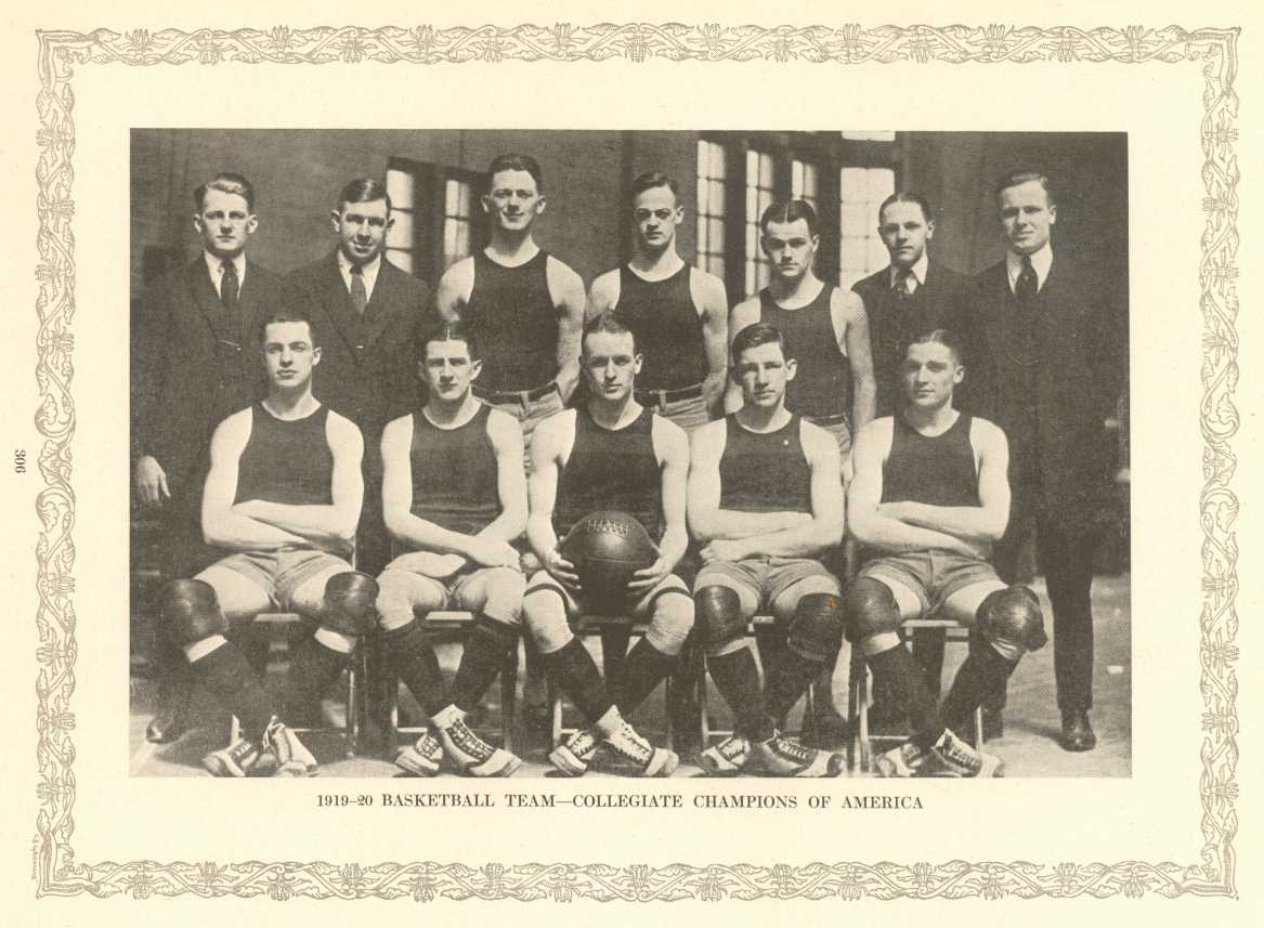
1919–20 Penn Quakers, collegiate champions of America

The 1919-1920 team finished the regular season with a 19–0 record and the Eastern championship. Penn defeated the Western champion University of Chicago two games to one in a best-of-three tournament at the end of the season to determine the national champion. The team was later retrospectively named the national champion by the Helms Athletic Foundation and was also retroactively listed as the top team of the season by the Premo-Porretta Power Poll.

The 1920-1921 team finished the season with a 21–2 record and was retrospectively named the national champion by the Helms Athletic Foundation. Penn's two losses came by a combined 3 points. The Helms selections, which cover the era before the 1939 NCAA Tournament, are listed by the NCAA in its annual Division I Men's Basketball Records Book but are not officially recognized as national championships by the NCAA.

=== 1979 Final Four ===
One of Penn's most memorable seasons came in 1978–79 when the Quakers advanced to the NCAA tournament Final Four. Player Tony Price led the Quakers, who stunned the nation with victories over Iona, North Carolina, Syracuse, and St. John's to advance to the Final Four. The Quakers faced Earvin "Magic" Johnson and Michigan State in the national semifinals in Salt Lake City, Utah, but were met with defeat, 101–67. They are the last Ivy League team to advance to the Final Four and Elite Eight of the NCAA tournament as of 2026.

=== Others ===
Other notable Penn teams include the team led by guards Matt Maloney and Jerome Allen during the mid-1990s and the nationally ranked teams of the early 1970s led by Dave Wohl, Steve Bilsky, Corky Calhoun and Bob Morse. Penn's 1970–71 team completed an undefeated regular season (26–0) and advanced to the Eastern Regional Final in the NCAA tournament, losing there to a Villanova team it had defeated during the regular season. Villanova lost to UCLA in the national championship game, but was later found to be using an ineligible player, Howard Porter.

== Rivalries ==
The Quakers, a member of the Philadelphia Big 5, have long-standing rivalries with a multitude of institutions such as Temple University, La Salle University, Saint Joseph's University, and Villanova University. Another rival is Drexel University, which is a member of the City 6. Penn’s traditional rival in the Ivy League is Princeton.

== Postseason ==
=== NCAA tournament results ===
The Quakers have appeared in the NCAA tournament 25 times. Their combined record is 13–27.

Year	Seed	Round	Opponent	Result
1953		Sweet Sixteen; Regional 3rd Place Game	Notre Dame; DePaul	L 57–69; W 90–70
1970		First Round	Niagara	L 69–79
1971		First Round; Sweet Sixteen; Elite Eight	Duquesne; South Carolina; Villanova	W 70–65; W 79–64; L 47–90
1972		First Round; Sweet Sixteen; Elite Eight	Providence; Villanova; North Carolina	W 76–60; W 78–67; L 59–73
1973		First Round; Sweet Sixteen; Regional 3rd Place Game	St. John's; Providence; Syracuse	W 62–61; L 65–87; L 68–69
1974		First Round	Providence	L 69–84
1975		First Round	Kansas State	L 62–69
1978		First Round; Sweet Sixteen	St. Bonaventure; Duke	W 92–83; L 80–84
1979	#9	First Round; Second Round; Sweet Sixteen; Elite Eight; Final Four; National 3rd Place Game	#8 Iona #1 North Carolina #4 Syracuse #10 St. John's #2 Michigan State #2 DePaul	W 73–69; W 72–71; W 84–76; W 64–62; L 67–101; L 93–96
1980	#12	First Round; Second Round	#5 Washington State #4 Duke	W 62–55; L 42–52
1982	#12	First Round	#5 St. John's	L 56–66
1985	#15	First Round	#2 Memphis	L 55–67
1987	#16	First Round	#1 North Carolina	L 82–113
1993	#14	First Round	#3 Massachusetts	L 50–54
1994	#11	First Round; Second Round	#6 Nebraska #3 Florida	W 90–80; L 58–70
1995	#12	First Round	#5 Alabama	L 85–91
1999	#11	First Round	#6 Florida	L 61–75
2000	#13	First Round	#4 Illinois	L 58–68
2002	#11	First Round	#6 California	L 75–82
2003	#11	First Round	#6 Oklahoma State	L 63–77
2005	#13	First Round	#4 Boston College	L 65–85
2006	#15	First Round	#2 Texas	L 52–60
2007	#14	First Round	#3 Texas A&M	L 52–68
2018	#16	First Round	#1 Kansas	L 60–76
2026	#14	First Round	#3 Illinois	L 70-105

=== NIT results ===
The Quakers have appeared in the National Invitation Tournament (NIT) one time. Their record is 0–1.

Year	Round	Opponent	Result
1981	First Round	West Virginia	L 64–67

=== CBI results ===
The Quakers have appeared in the College Basketball Invitational (CBI) one time. Their record is 1–1.

Year	Round	Opponent	Result
2012	First Round; Quarterfinals	Quinnipiac; Butler	W 74–63; L 53–63

== Player awards ==
Ivy League Player of the Year

- TJ Power (2026)
- Jordan Dingle (2023)
- A. J. Brodeur (2020)
- Zack Rosen (2012)
- Ibrahim Jaaber (2006, 2007)
- Tim Begley (2005)
- Ugonna Onyekwe (2002, 2003)
- Mike Jordan (2000)
- Ira Bowman (1996)
- Matt Maloney (1995)
- Jerome Allen (1993, 1994)
- Perry Bromwell (1987)
- Paul Little (1982)
- Tony Price (1979)
- Keven McDonald (1978)
- Ron Haigler (1975)

Ivy League Rookie of the Year

- Jordan Dingle (2020)*
- Tyler Bernardini (2008)
- Ugonna Onyekwe (2000)
- Will McAllister (1991)
- Paul Little (1980)
- Keven McDonald (1976)
- Ron Haigler (1973)

== Participations in FIBA competitions ==
- 1975 FIBA Intercontinental Cup: 4th place
