= 2011–12 Columbia Lions men's basketball team =

American college basketball season

2011–12 Columbia Lions men's basketball
- Conference: Ivy League
- Record: 15–15 (4–10 Ivy)
- Head coach: Kyle Smith (2nd season)
- Assistant coaches: Carlin Hartman; Koby Altman; Mike Magpayo
- Home arena: Levien Gymnasium

2011–12 Ivy League men's basketball standings
	Conf.				Overall
Team	W		L	PCT	W		L	PCT
Harvard	12	–	2	.857	26	–	5	.839
Penn	11	–	3	.786	20	–	13	.606
Princeton	10	–	4	.714	20	–	12	.625
Yale	9	–	5	.643	19	–	10	.655
Cornell	7	–	7	.500	12	–	16	.429
Columbia	4	–	10	.286	15	–	15	.500
Brown	2	–	12	.143	8	–	23	.258
Dartmouth	1	–	13	.071	5	–	25	.167
As of March 15, 2012; Rankings from AP Poll

The 2011–12 Columbia Lions men's basketball team represented Columbia University during the 2011–12 NCAA Division I men's basketball season. The Lions, led by second year head coach Kyle Smith, played their home games at Levien Gymnasium as members of the Ivy League.

== Previous season ==
Under new head coach Kyle Smith, the Lions had a winning record of 15–13.

== Roster ==
Number	Name	Position	Height	Weight	Year	Hometown
1	Noruwa Agho	Guard	6–3	220	Senior	
10	Brian Barbour	Guard	6–1	175	Junior	
55	Mark Cisco	Center	6–9	245	Junior	
20	Chris Crockett	Guard	5-10	190	Senior	
15	John Daniels	Forward	6-8	220	Senior	
12	Steve Egee	Guard	6-2	190	Senior	
31	Van Green	Guard	6-3	185	Sophomore	
3	Matt Johnson	Guard	6-7	210	Senior	
4	Dean Kowalski	Guard	5-10	165	Junior	
22	Meiko Lyles	Guard	6-3	200	Sophomore	
23	Cory Osetkowski	Center	6-11	270	Freshmen	
25	Samer Ozeir	Forward	6-8	205	Freshmen	
13	Alex Rosenberg	Forward	6-7	210	Freshmen	
21	Noah Springwater	Guard	6-3	180	Freshmen	
30	Blaise Staab	Forward	6-5	215	Senior	
35	Darius Stevens	Forward	6-6	190	Freshmen	

== Schedule ==
Date time, TV	Rank^{#}	Opponent^{#}	Result	Record	Site (attendance) city, state
Regular Season
11/11/2011*; 7:00 pm, ESPNU		at Connecticut	L 57–70	0–1	Harry A. Gampel Pavilion (10,167); Storrs, CT
11/14/2011*; 7:00 pm		Furman	L 58–62	0–2	Levien Gymnasium (719); New York City, NY
11/19/2011*; 7:00 pm		American	L 58–66	0–3	Levien Gymnasium (1,232); New York City, NY
11/22/2011*; 7:00 pm		at Stony Brook	L 53–67	0–4	Pritchard Gymnasium (1,166); Stony Brook, NY
11/26/2011*; 2:00 pm		at Manhattan	W 59–41	1–4	Draddy Gymnasium (1,138); Riverdale, NY
11/28/2011*		Swarthmore	W 104–42	2–4	Levien Gymnasium; New York, NY
12/02/2011*; 7:00 pm		at Loyola Marymount; Doubletree Los Angeles Westwide Centennial Classic	W 69–61	3–4	Gersten Pavilion (3,844); Los Angeles, CA
12/03/2011*; 7:00 pm		at North Texas; Doubletree Los Angeles Westwide Centennial Classic	W 72–57	4–4	Gersten Pavilion (2,195); Los Angeles, CA
12/04/2011*		at La Sierra; Doubletree Los Angeles Westwide Centennial Classic	W 78–56	5–4	Gersten Pavilion; Los Angeles, CA
12/06/2011*		Holy Cross	W 46–45	6–4	Levien Gymnasium; New York City, NY
12/10/2011*; 2:00 pm		Long Island	W 63–53	7–4	Levien Gymnasium (874); New York City, NY
12/28/2011*		at Marist	L 57–79	7–5	McCann Field House; Poughkeepsie, NY
12/30/2011*		Lafayette	W 77–67	8–5	Levien Gymnasium; New York City, NY
01/02/2012*		Fairleigh Dickinson	W 67–52	9–5	Levien Gymnasium; New York City, NY
01/04/2012		at Colgate	W 66–59	10–5	Cotterell Court; Hamilton, NY
01/08/2012*; 2:00 pm		at Elon	W 65–60	11–5	Alumni Gym (1,306); Elon, NC
Ivy League
01/13/2012; 7:00 pm		Penn	L 64–66	11–6 (0–1)	Levien Gymnasium (2,029); New York City, NY
01/14/2012; 7:00 pm		Princeton	L 58–62	11–7 (0–2)	Levien Gymnasium (1,764); New York City, NY
01/21/2012		Cornell	W 61–56	12–7 (1–2)	Levien Gymnasium; New York City, NY
01/28/2012		at Cornell	L 60–65	12–8 (1–3)	Newman Arena; Ithaca, NY
02/03/2012		at Dartmouth	W 64–62	13–8 (2–3)	Leede Arena; Hanover, NH
02/04/2012; 7:00 pm		at Harvard	L 52–57	13–9 (2–4)	Lavietes Pavilion (2,195); Boston, MA
02/10/2012		Brown	W 86–60	14–9 (3–4)	Levien Gymnasium; New York City, NY
02/11/2012; 7:00 pm		Yale	L 58–59	14–10 (3–5)	Levien Gymnasium (2,442); New York City, NY
02/17/2012; 7:00 pm, ESPNU		at Princeton	L 66–77	14–11 (3–6)	Jadwin Gymnasium; Princeton, NJ
02/18/2012; 7:00 pm		at Penn	L 66–77 ^{OT}	14–12 (3–7)	The Palestra (4,103); Philadelphia, PA
02/24/2012; 7:00 pm, YES		at Yale	L 67–75	14–13 (3–8)	John J. Lee Amphitheater (1,821); New Haven, CT
02/25/2012		at Brown	L 78–94	14–14 (3–9)	Pizzitola Sports Center; Providence, RI
03/02/2012; 7:00 pm		Harvard	L 70–77 ^{OT}	14–15 (3–10)	Levien Gymnasium (2,702); New York City, NY
03/03/2012		Dartmouth	W 61–55	15–15 (4–10)	Levien Gymnasium; New York City, NY
*Non-conference game. ^{#}Rankings from AP Poll. (#) Tournament seedings in parentheses. All times are in Eastern Time.
