= James Turner (Nottinghamshire cricketer) =

English cricketer

James Turner (23 July 1865 — 30 July 1945) was an English cricketer. He was a right-arm medium-pace bowler who played for Nottinghamshire. He was born in Teversal and died in Sutton-in-Ashfield.

Turner, who had just two months previously represented the Nottinghamshire Colts in a miscellaneous match, made two first-class appearances in August 1894, his first-class debut coming against Lancashire. Batting as a tailender, Turner's only notable contribution in his two matches was a knock of 26 against Kent, in a drawn match.
