= James M. Turner (physicist) =

American physicist and government official

James Marshall Turner
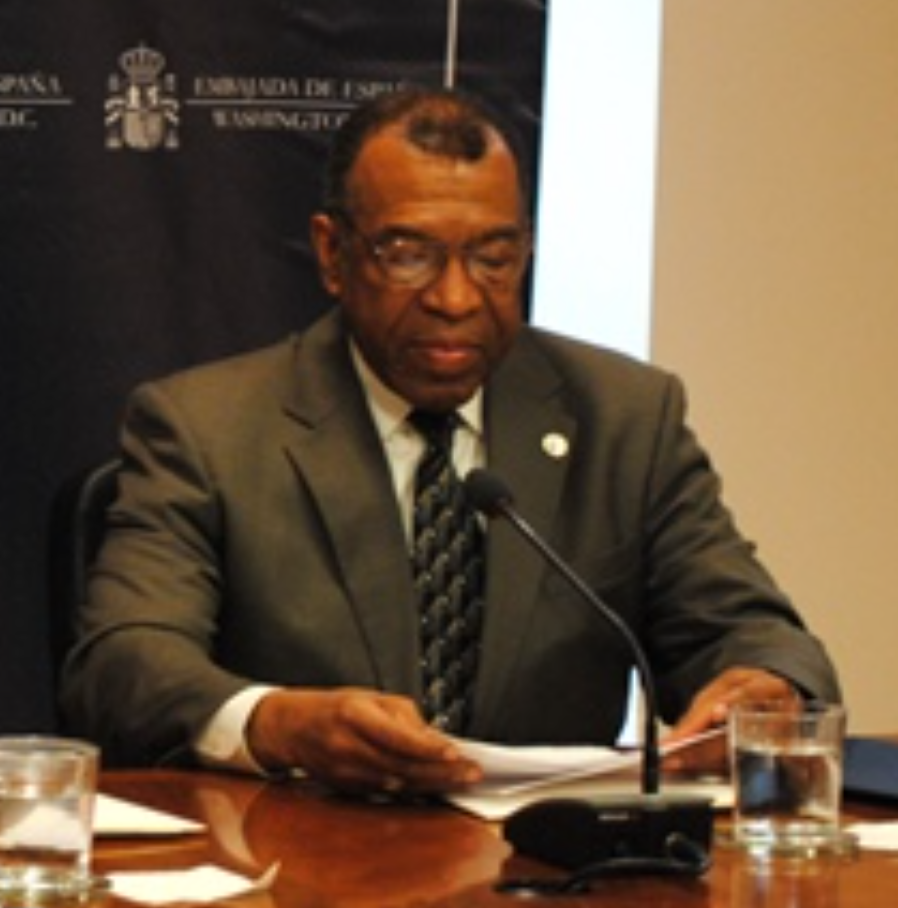
- Turner in 2010
- Born: Washington, D.C.
- Education: Johns Hopkins University (BA); Massachusetts Institute of Technology (PhD)
- Scientific career
- Fields: Physics
- Workplaces: Southern University; Morehouse College; United States Department of Energy; National Institute of Standards and Technology; National Oceanic and Atmospheric Administration
- Thesis: An examination of magnetohydrodynamic discontinuities in the solar wind and an investigation of their origin (1971)

James Marshall Turner is an American physicist and retired government official. Over the course of his career, he served as Director of the National Oceanic and Atmospheric Administration's Office of International Affairs and as deputy director of the National Institute of Standards and Technology.

Turner was also a founding member of the Massachusetts Institute of Technology's Black Students' Union.

== Early life and education ==
James Turner was raised in Washington, D.C., and attended Gonzaga College High School. He completed his undergraduate studies at Johns Hopkins University, and received his doctorate in physics from the Massachusetts Institute of Technology.

While at MIT, Turner was a co-founder and one of the first co-chairs of the university's Black Students' Union, along with fellow students Charles Kidwell, Shirley Ann Jackson, Ronald E. Mickens, Sekazi Mtingwa, Jennifer Rudd, Nathan Seely, and Linda Sharpe. In 1968, the group issued the following demands to the MIT administration: "an increase in the number of black students and staff, as well as support for these students; the formation of a pre-freshman summer program (Project Interphase); and the development of a Task Force on Educational Opportunity."

== Career ==
After completing his doctoral studies, Turner was on the faculty of Southern University and Morehouse College in the physics department. At Morehouse, he was an Associate Professor of Physics and Engineering for five years beginning in 1973. As a professor there, he was advisor to the college's chapter of the Sigma Pi Sigma student society. During this time, he was also a member of the Committee on Opportunities in Science for the American Association for the Advancement of Science, as well as on similar committees for the American Geophysical Union and the American Meteorological Society.

Turner subsequently began a career in federal government that would last 37 years. He served as Senior Executive Service and served as the Assistant Deputy Administrator for Nuclear Risk Reduction in the Department of Energy's National Nuclear Security Administration. He also served as a deputy director of the National Institute of Standards and Technology beginning in April 2007; and was later director in the National Oceanic and Atmospheric Administration’s Office of International Affairs and Senior Adviser to the NOAA Administrator. He retired from the NOAA in 2013.

Turner is a member of numerous professional organizations, including the American Physical Society, the American Chemical Society, the American Nuclear Society, the American Association for the Advancement of Science, ASTM, the Council on Foreign Relations, IEEE, Phi Beta Kappa, and Sigma Xi. He is currently director of the Daniel Alexander Payne Community Development Corporation Percy Julian Institute.

== Awards ==
- Fellow, American Association for the Advancement of Science
- U.S. Government Presidential Rank Award for Meritorious Service
- DOE Exceptional Service Award
- Secretary of Energy Gold Award
- Edward Bouchet Legacy Award (2019)

== Personal life ==
Turner is married and has three children and five grandchildren.
