= James Harvey Turner =

Mississippi state politician

James "Slick" Harvey Turner (August 21, 1930 – April 30, 1991) was a state legislator in Mississippi. He served in the Mississippi Legislature from 1968 to 1980. He represented Leake County and Neshoba County, the 26th District.

He was born in Conway, Mississippi. He served as president of the Mississippi Cattlemen's Association. His address was documented as Route 6 in Carthage, Mississippi.
