= Rich Paul =

American sports agent (born 1980)

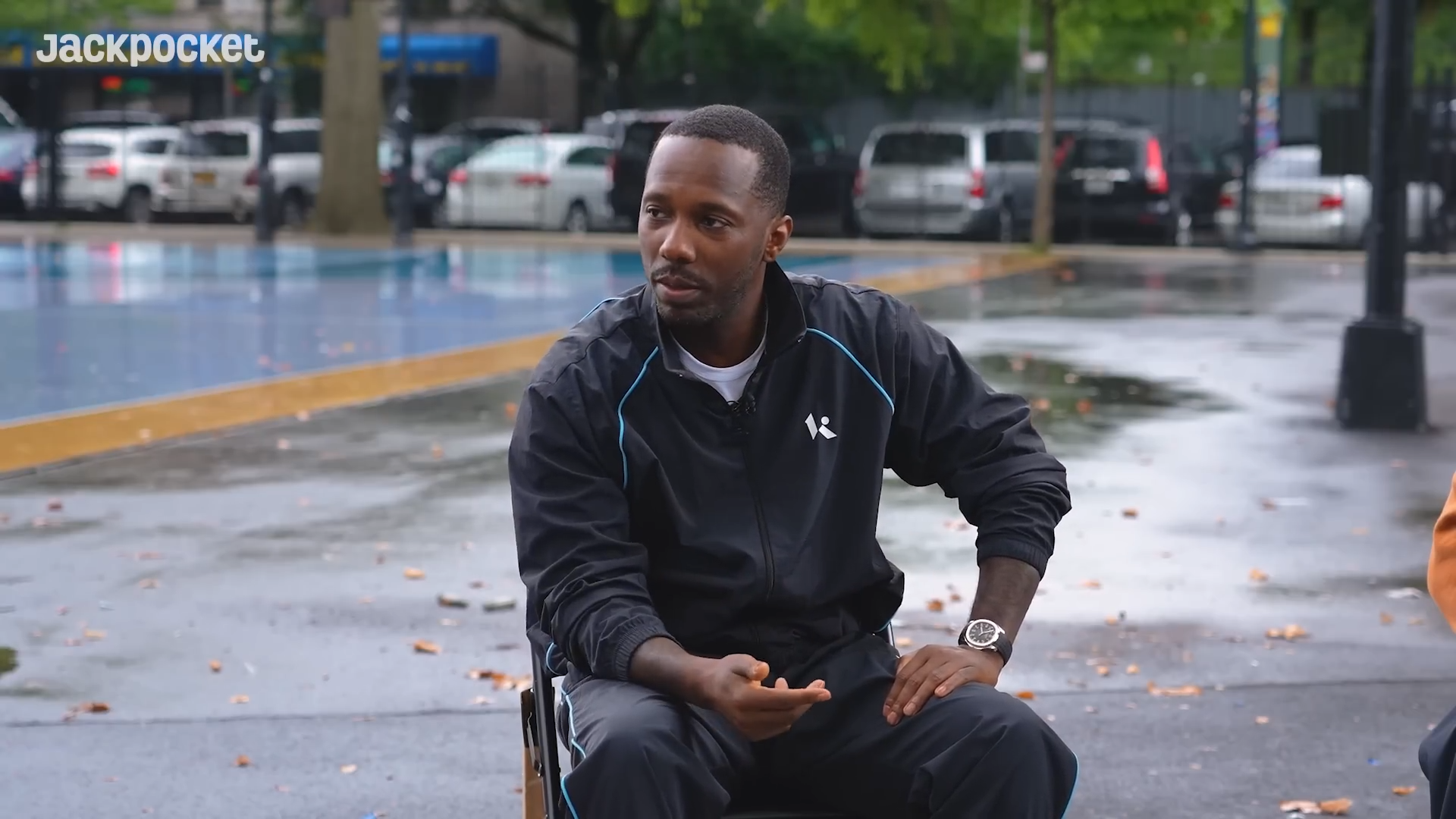
- Paul in 2024
- Born: Richard Paul; December 16, 1980 (age 45); Cleveland, Ohio, U.S.
- Occupations: Sports agent; CEO of Klutch Sports Group; co-head of Sports at United Talent Agency
- Years active: 2003–present
- Title: Founder, Klutch Sports Group
- Board member of: United Talent Agency; Los Angeles County Museum of Art; Live Nation Entertainment
- Partner(s): Adele (2021–present; engaged)
- Children: 3

Richard Paul (born December 16, 1980) is an American entrepreneur, sports agent, and founder and chief executive officer of Klutch Sports Group. His most notable client is basketball player and longtime friend LeBron James. Paul is also co-head of the sports division at United Talent Agency.

== Early life ==
Paul grew up in a one-bedroom apartment above his father's store, R & J Confectionery, on East 125th and Arlington in Forest Hill, a neighborhood on the east side of Cleveland. His father, Rich Paul Sr., enrolled him in the private, fee-paying Benedictine High School, a Catholic school.

After graduating from high school, Paul was mentored by Distant Replays owner Andy Hyman on selling vintage jerseys. He would buy throwback jerseys from Atlanta and sell them out of his trunk in Cleveland. Paul was a student at the University of Akron when his father was diagnosed with intestinal cancer in 1999. To be closer to him, Paul transferred to Cleveland State. A few months later, his father died, and Paul dropped out of school. Paul said: "He was always telling me my education was important ... I always wanted to work. But I still probably would have finished school if my father was alive. I never wanted to let him down."

In 2002, he met LeBron James at the Akron–Canton Airport, where James was impressed by Paul's authentic Warren Moon throwback jersey. The two exchanged contact information, and soon Paul had sold James a Magic Johnson Lakers jersey and a Joe Namath Rams jersey.

== Career ==
Following the 2003 NBA draft, Paul joined James as a part of his small inner circle, along with James' childhood friends Maverick Carter and Randy Mims. He would later start working under Leon Rose, who had negotiated James' extension with the Cavaliers in 2006, at Creative Artists Agency (CAA).

In 2012, Paul, along with James, left Rose and Creative Artists Agency to start his own agency, Klutch Sports Group.

In 2013, Paul enlisted noted long-time agent and attorney Mark Termini to run the NBA contract negotiations for Klutch.

Before the start of the 2017–18 season, Phoenix Suns owner Robert Sarver had told Paul that if he did not sever ties to head coach Earl Watson, who had Paul and the Klutch Sports Group as an agent at the time, he would fire Watson from the team. After the Suns got off to a 0–3 start, two being blowout losses (including the worst loss in franchise history and worst season-opening performance in NBA history), Watson was fired on October 22, and replaced on an interim basis by associate head coach Jay Triano for the rest of that season. This story later became part of a subsequent major report on Sarver, which led to his year-long suspension from the NBA and, afterward, Sarver's agreement to sell the Suns and Phoenix Mercury to a new owner.

In June 2019, Paul was featured on the Sports Illustrated cover, which dubbed him "The King Maker". In July 2019, United Talent Agency (UTA) said it had invested strategically in Klutch Sports Group and asked Paul to run its Sports division. Jeremy Zimmer, United Talent Agency's chief executive officer (CEO), said they took a "significant ownership" in Klutch, but Paul "maintains control as operator of his business". Neither Paul nor Zimmer wanted to disclose the value of the financial investment. Paul expanded the division's clients from 4 to 23. In August 2019, the National Collegiate Athletic Association (NCAA) changed its regulations for agents, requiring them to hold a bachelor's degree. Called the "Rich Paul Rule" by the media, it was widely seen as a swipe at Paul for having not graduated from college and for working with a high school prospect Darius Bazley who decided to work as an intern for New Balance for a year before entering the 2019 NBA draft rather than attend Syracuse or even enter the NBA G League like he first planned to do. Paul argued in an op-ed in The Athletic that the rule would prevent people from less prestigious backgrounds, people of color, and those without the funds to attend college from working as agents in the future so NCAA executives could have more control. The NCAA later backed down from the regulation change.

In 2020, Paul launched Klutch Conversations during the NBA All-Star Weekend with SocialWorks and General Mills to encourage financial literacy among young people. In July 2020, he was appointed to United Talent Agency's board of directors. GQ magazine named Paul "Power Broker of the Year" in its December–January 2020 issue. By the conclusion of Termini's tenure at Klutch in 2020, Klutch Sports had a roster of 25 clients, and Termini had led negotiations on over US$1 billion worth of NBA contracts for said clients. It was around this time Paul picked up the nickname in agency circles, "Rich" Paul referring to the commission he began to take in.

In April 2021, it was announced that Paul had partnered with former Nike executives to form Adopt, a minority-owned marketing and creative agency that assists companies in the sports and wellness sector. The following month, Isaac Chotiner of The New Yorker wrote that Paul "is known for driving hard bargains for star clients, giving them new power in the N.B.A." In August 2021, Paul was reportedly being sued by Nerlens Noel on the grounds of a breach of fiduciary duty, breach of contract, and negligence for his role in turning down a $70 million contract offer from the Dallas Mavericks in the offseason preceding the 2017–18 season. New Balance asked Paul to collaborate on a new release of the NB550 sneaker which went on sale in December 2021.

In 2022, Paul joined the Los Angeles County Museum of Art (LACMA) board of trustees. In May 2022, Paul, alongside Bob Iger and eBay, was part of a consortium in a $263 million strategic investment led by Peter Chernin's The Chernin Group into the pop-culture collectibles company Funko, taking a 25% stake between the four of them. Following this, Paul was appointed advisor to Funko's board of directors, helping the company to "expand its presence in the music and sports categories". Paul was fourth on Forbes' 2022 "World's Most Powerful Sports Agents" list.

Paul and Noel eventually reached a settlement on January 11, 2023. Noel paid full commissions on a $5 million deal he signed in 2020 with the New York Knicks and withdrew all legal proceedings afterward. In February 2023, Paul launched Klutch Athletics, a new sportswear brand in collaboration with New Balance. In April 2023, he was added to the board of directors of Live Nation Entertainment. Paul wrote a book with Jesse Washington, Lucky Me: A Memoir of Changing the Odds, published in October 2023. It was on The New York Times best-seller list upon its release. In November 2023, Paul resigned from Funko's board of directors following a wave of departures, including CEO Brian Mariotti and other senior executives, as the company recorded a financial loss in the third quarter. In 2023, Variety named Paul to its Variety500 index for the fourth consecutive year as one of the most "influential business leaders shaping the global media industry".

In March 2024, Robinhood chose Klutch Sports Group to "serve as its agency of record for sports and entertainment partnerships", appointing Paul to be the company's strategic brand advisor. In the summer of 2024, Paul expanded his scope to Europe by working with co-founder and managing director Björn Bezemer of Representatives Of Outstanding Footballers (ROOF), Germany's largest soccer player agency. The German agency, which has 150 clients across the European "Big Five", was initially acquired by United Talent Agency and integrated into Klutch Sports Group. Bezemer was appointed head of Klutch Global Football.

== Personal life ==
Paul has three children. In 2021, he began a relationship with British singer Adele. On August 9, 2024, she announced they were engaged.

He was included in the 2020 "Ebony Power 100 List".

== Written works ==
- Paul, Rich (2023). Lucky Me: A Memoir of Changing the Odds. New York: Roc Lit 101. ISBN 978-059344-847-2.
