= Anthony Davis =

American basketball player (born 1993)

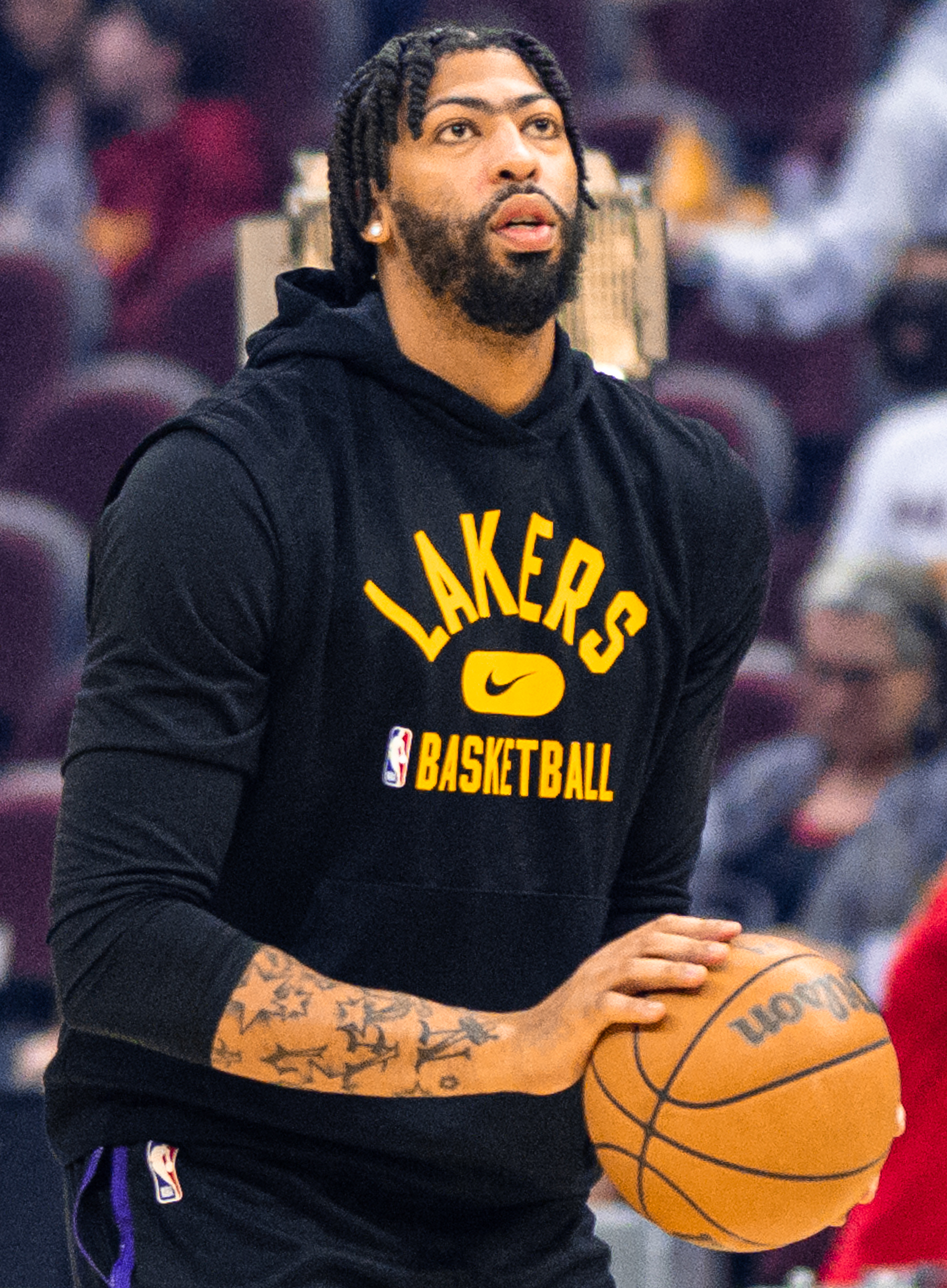
- Davis with the Los Angeles Lakers in 2022

No. 23 – Washington Wizards
- Position: Center / power forward
- League: NBA

Personal information
- Born: March 11, 1993 (age 33) Chicago, Illinois, U.S.
- Listed height: 6 ft 10 in (2.08 m)
- Listed weight: 253 lb (115 kg)

Career information
- High school: Perspectives Charter (Chicago, Illinois)
- College: Kentucky (2011–2012)
- NBA draft: 2012: 1st round, 1st overall pick
- Drafted by: New Orleans Hornets
- Playing career: 2012–present

Career history
- 2012–2019: New Orleans Hornets / Pelicans
- 2019–2025: Los Angeles Lakers
- 2025–2026: Dallas Mavericks
- 2026–present: Washington Wizards

Career highlights
- NBA champion (2020); 10× NBA All-Star (2014–2021, 2024, 2025); NBA All-Star Game MVP (2017); 4× All-NBA First Team (2015, 2017, 2018, 2020); All-NBA Second Team (2024); 3× NBA All-Defensive First Team (2018, 2020, 2024); 2× NBA All-Defensive Second Team (2015, 2017); 3× NBA blocks leader (2014, 2015, 2018); NBA All-Rookie First Team (2013); NBA Cup champion (2023); NBA 75th Anniversary Team; NCAA champion (2012); NCAA Final Four Most Outstanding Player (2012); National college player of the year (2012); Consensus first-team All-American (2012); NABC Defensive Player of the Year (2012); USBWA National Freshman of the Year (2012); SEC Male Athlete of the Year (2012); SEC Player of the Year (2012); NCAA blocks leader (2012); SEC Defensive Player of the Year (2012); SEC Rookie of the Year (2012); First-team Parade All-American (2011); McDonald's All-American (2011)
- Stats at NBA.com
- Stats at Basketball Reference
Medals
Men's basketball
Representing the United States
Olympic Games
Gold medal – first place	2012 London	Team
Gold medal – first place	2024 Paris	Team
World Cup
Gold medal – first place	2014 Spain	Team

Anthony Marshon Davis Jr. (born March 11, 1993), nicknamed "AD" and "the Brow", is an American professional basketball player for the Washington Wizards of the National Basketball Association (NBA). Davis, a power forward and center, is a ten-time NBA All-Star and has been named to five All-NBA Teams (including four first-team selections) and five NBA All-Defensive Teams (including three first-team selections). In 2021, he was named to the NBA 75th Anniversary Team. Davis is widely regarded as one of the greatest power forwards of all time.

Davis played one season of college basketball for the Kentucky Wildcats, when he was first team All-American and the Consensus National Player of the Year. He also won the USBWA National Freshman of the Year, NABC Defensive Player of the Year and the Pete Newell Big Man Award. Davis led the NCAA in blocks and set Southeastern Conference and NCAA Division I freshman single-season blocked shots records. He led Kentucky to a national championship and was named the most outstanding player of the 2012 NCAA Division I men's basketball tournament.

Davis left college for the NBA after one season and was drafted as the first overall pick in the 2012 NBA draft by the New Orleans Hornets, and was selected that summer to play in the 2012 Olympics. After his rookie season, he was named to the NBA All-Rookie First Team. The next season, he became an All-Star for the first time and led the NBA in blocked shots per game. In 2017, he was named the NBA All-Star Game MVP after scoring a then-record 52 points in the 2017 NBA All-Star Game. Davis was traded to the Los Angeles Lakers in 2019, where he won an NBA championship in 2020 and the first edition of the NBA Cup in 2023. In February 2025, he was traded to the Dallas Mavericks in exchange for Luka Dončić in what was regarded as one of the most unexpected trades in American sports history. A year later, he was traded to the Washington Wizards.

Davis has won gold medals with the United States national team on their 2012 Olympic team, 2014 World Cup team and 2024 Olympic team. He is also one of only eight players to achieve the basketball Triple Crown.

== Early life ==
Born in Chicago, Davis grew up in the Englewood neighborhood and played high school basketball for Perspectives Charter School, where he had attended school since sixth grade. The team plays in the Blue Division of the Chicago Public High School League, which is ignored by the media because of its lower level of competition. Perspectives is a charter school that operates as a math and science academy; it has a strong academic reputation, but minimal athletic success. The school had no gymnasium and Davis's middle school basketball teams practiced at the nearby Second Presbyterian Church in Chicago's historic South Loop District. In junior high school, he was known as "the little guy who would shoot threes from the corner". He ended his freshman year at a height of 6 feet 0 inches (1.83 m). By the beginning of his sophomore year, he had grown another 1 inch (2.5 cm), and he finished the year at 6 feet 4 inches (1.93 m).

Davis began his junior basketball season at 6 feet 8 inches (2.03 m), saying he felt fortunate to have had such a rapid growth spurt without any knee pains. During his junior year, his family considered having him transfer to one of Chicago's basketball powerhouses, but Hyde Park Career Academy head coach Donnie Kirksey advised against it, saying "If you're good enough, they'll find you wherever you are". Perspectives finished the season 8–15. Although he remained unnoticed nationally and locally after three seasons of Chicago Public League play, he was soon thereafter rated as the number one player in the class of 2011 by Scout.com and was listed in the ESPNU 100. Attention came when he started playing on Tai Streets' Meanstreets (AAU team) traveling system in the spring of his junior year. In late April, Syracuse University offered him a scholarship. That spring, NBA Top 100 Camp Director Dave Telep invited him to the camp based on his dominant first-half performance of the first game of the Fort Wayne, Indiana Spiece Fieldhouse event. In August 2010, Davis played in the Nike Global Challenge in Hillsboro, Oregon. In the opening game, he had 23 points and 9 rebounds.

Davis verbally committed to Kentucky on August 13, 2010, choosing it over DePaul, Ohio State and Syracuse. On August 24, 2010, he became the number one rated player in the national class of 2011 at Scout.com.

Before Davis committed to Kentucky, the Chicago Sun-Times reported that his father had asked Kentucky for $200,000 in exchange for a commitment from Davis. The report was initially released on Wednesday August 4, 2010, by Sun-Times reporter Michael O'Brien. Citing "a reliable source", he posted the following text: "Rumors/sources that have Davis choosing Kentucky are also alleging that the commitment cost $200,000." The sentence was later edited to say "rumors that Davis's commitment is for sale have surfaced since he cut his list of schools down about a month ago." The sentence was removed later that day from the Sun-Times' high school sports website following a threat from a University of Kentucky lawyer. Anthony Davis Sr. declined to speak to the Chicago Tribune on August 4 regarding the allegation; on July 30, however, he denied the allegations to the Sun-Times, stating, "We haven't asked anyone for anything, and no one has offered us anything".

The article was reposted on the Sun-Times' website and included in the print edition on Friday August 6. O'Brien wrote "sources from three separate universities told the Sun-Times that Davis Sr. asked for money in return for his son's commitment, with the amounts ranging from $125,000 to $150,000." The University of Kentucky and the Davis family both threatened to sue the Sun-Times over the article; however, no lawsuits were filed by Kentucky or the Davis family. The Davises and Kentucky claim the restated publication was false. Illinois' one-year statute of limitations on libel cases expired before any lawsuits were filed.

Davis signed his National Letter of Intent on November 10, 2010. He began his senior season on the Chicago Sun-Times area 2010 Top 50 list. He was a pre-season first team all-state selection by the Sun-Times. By that time, he stood at 6 feet 10 inches (2.08 m). His team's game against Whitney M. Young Magnet High School was nationally televised on ESPNU. Perspectives finished the season with a 6–19 record. Despite his growth, Davis continued to perform aspects of the role of a guard during the season by bringing the ball up the court and shooting outside shots. For the season, he averaged 32 points, 22 rebounds and 7 blocks.

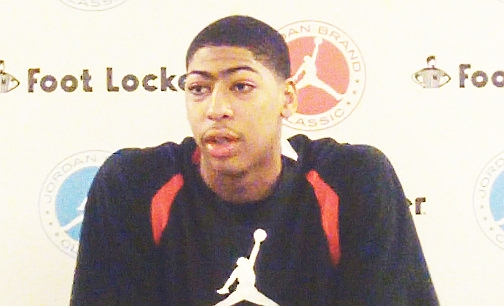
Davis at the Jordan Brand Classic in April 2011

In high school, Davis earned numerous honors for his basketball abilities, including being named to the 2011 McDonald's All-American Game and the 10th annual Jordan Brand Classic. He was a first team USA Today All-USA high school basketball team selection. He was a first-team Parade All-American. He was also a first team All-American selection by SLAM Magazine (along with Gilchrist, Rivers, Beal, Quincy Miller and Marquis Teague) and Dime Magazine (along with Gilchrist, Rivers, Beal and Myles Mack). He was a first team selection to the ESPN Rise boys' high school basketball All-American team. In the statewide voting for Illinois Mr. Basketball by coaches and media, he placed fourth. The Chicago Sun-Times selected him as a Class 3A first team All-State selection. The Chicago Sun-Times selected him as an all-Public League selection. The Illinois Basketball Coaches Association included him in the Class 3A/4A boys all-state first team.

In the March 30, 2011, McDonald's All-American Game, in front of a hometown crowd at the United Center, Davis made his first five field goals on his way to a 14-point, 6-rebound, 2-steal and 4-block performance. In the April 9 Nike Hoops Summit, Davis led the USA Basketball team to a 92–80 victory over the world team with a team-high 10 rebounds to go with 16 points and two blocks. He was named co-MVP of the April 16 Jordan Brand Classic game after posting 29 points (on 13-for-15 shooting), 11 rebounds and four blocks in a losing effort. Davis's 29 points was the second-highest point total in the first 10 years of the Jordan Brand Classic, following only LeBron James's 34-point performance.

College recruiting
Name	Hometown	School	Height	Weight	Commit date
Anthony Davis; F	Chicago, IL	Perspectives Charter School	6 ft 10 in (2.08 m)	220 lb (100 kg)	Aug 13, 2010
Anthony Davis; F	Recruit ratings: Scout: Rivals: (98)				
Overall recruit ranking: Scout: 1 Rivals: 2, 1 (PF) ESPN: 1
Note: In many cases, Scout, Rivals, 247Sports, On3, and ESPN may conflict in their listings of height and weight.; In these cases, the average was taken. ESPN grades are on a 100-point scale.; Sources: "Kentucky 2011 Basketball Commitments". Rivals.; "2011 Kentucky Basketball Commits". Scout.; "ESPN". ESPN.; "Scout.com Team Recruiting Rankings". Scout.; "2011 Team Ranking". Rivals.

== College career ==
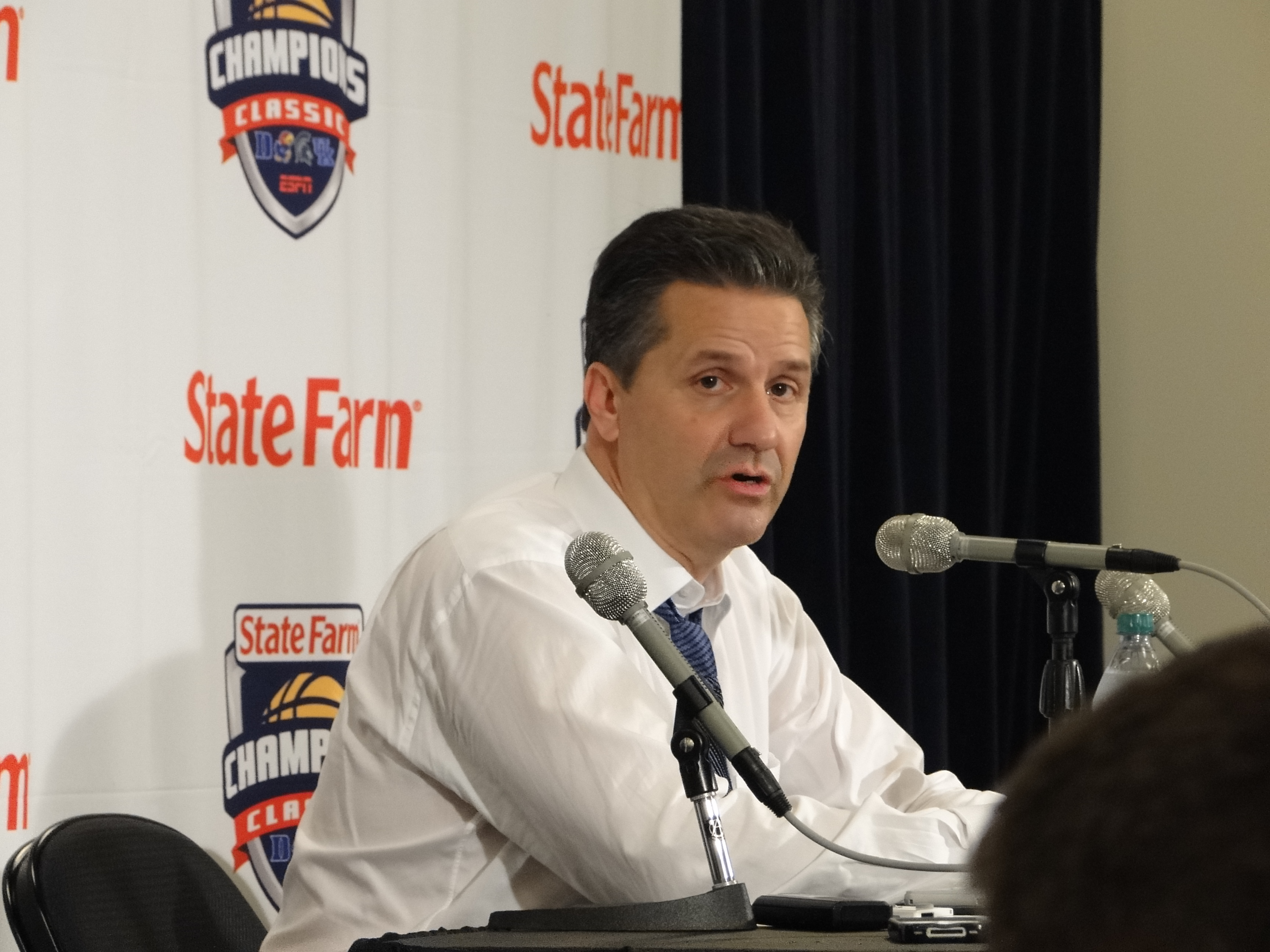
Davis played at Kentucky for head coach John Calipari.

Davis committed to the Kentucky Wildcats, coached by John Calipari. Before his college career began, he was being mentioned as the first overall selection in the 2012 NBA draft. In late February Dick Vitale mentioned the possibility that Davis might complete the men's college basketball awards Grand Slam of National Player of the Year, Defensive Player of the Year, Freshman of the Year and the No. 1 overall pick in the upcoming draft." Davis wore No. 23, which he had worn since high school, and would continue to wear with the Pelicans. Davis, who came from Chicago, selected the number because Michael Jordan had worn it. During the exhibition portion of the season for the 2011–12 Wildcats, Calipari described Davis as follows: "He's 6–10 with a 7–3 wingspan and he can shoot the 3 and dribble the ball and lead the break. . ." Less than a month into the season, ESPN's Andy Katz described him similarly: "Davis offers a multitude of skills for the Wildcats with his ability to block shots, run the floor, score in the low post and face up to the basket." Since Calipari had coached Marcus Camby, who was also a tall shot-blocker, Davis drew comparisons to Camby. ESPN selected Davis as a preseason All-American along with teammate Terrence Jones. Some sources, such as Blue Ribbon, selected Connecticut's Andre Drummond as the preseason Freshman/Newcomer of the Year ahead of Davis, although Davis was the only freshman on the ESPN 10-man preseason team. Davis only received one vote for the Associated Press preseason All-America team.

"Anthony is a tremendous shot blocker with great size and length. He can make 3-pointers, dribble the ball and he can get up and down the court faster than some of our guards because of his long, looping strides. He's a different player than Marcus Camby, but he's physically ahead of where Marcus was to start his freshman season."

— Kentucky head coach John Calipari

After most of the pre-conference schedule but before the 2011–12 Southeastern Conference men's basketball schedule, Davis's teammate, Michael Kidd-Gilchrist, was mentioned as a possible Southeastern Conference Men's Basketball Player of the Year. However, after less than a month of Southeastern Conference play, Davis was not only being mentioned as conference player of the year, but also National Player of the Year. By mid-February, he was considered a National Player of the Year front-runner with his primary competition coming from Thomas Robinson of Kansas. As the season progressed, he continued to battle Robinson while developing a college level offensive game. Davis averaged a double-double and 6.5 blocks in the two games (November 15, 2011, and April 2, 2012) they played against each other, both on neutral courts. Davis led the Wildcats to a perfect 16–0 record in conference play en route to the SEC conference regular season championship. Davis finished the year with averages of 14.2 points per game, 10.4 rebounds per game, 4.7 blocks per game and a field goal percentage of 62.3%. The Wildcats entered the SEC Tournament as heavy favorites and defeated LSU and Florida before losing to the Vanderbilt Commodores in the championship game. Despite the loss, the Wildcats earned the number one overall seed in the 2012 NCAA Division I men's basketball tournament. In the Wildcats' six NCAA Tournament games, Davis averaged 15.2 points, 11.2 rebounds and 4.6 blocks per game, and led the team to its eighth NCAA championship.

=== Honors and awards ===
==== National ====
Davis was named the 2012 Sporting News Men's College Basketball Player of the Year. On March 19, he won the US Basketball Writers Association's (USBWA) Robertson trophy. The Commonwealth Athletic Club of Kentucky named Davis the Adolph Rupp Trophy winner on March 22. CBSSports.com recognized Davis as their national player of the year. On March 30, he became the second freshman (Kevin Durant) to win the Associated Press College Basketball Player of the Year. On March 31, he won the John R. Wooden Award. The following day he won the Naismith College Player of the Year. He was Kentucky's first Naismith winner and the first from the SEC in 42 years (Pete Maravich).

Davis was named to the 2012 Sporting News All-American first team. He was also named first team All-American by the United States Basketball Writers Association. On March 20, the National Association of Basketball Coaches (NABC) chose him as a first team All-American. Davis was a CBSSports.com first team All-American. Davis was named a first team Associated Press All-American, making him a unanimous first team All-American selection.

During the 2012 NCAA Tournament, Davis was selected to the NCAA South Regional All-Tournament Team. Then, in the 2012 NCAA Division I men's basketball tournament final four, he posted 18 points, 14 rebounds and 5 blocks against Louisville. In the championship game, he had 16 rebounds, 6 blocks, 5 assists, 3 steals and 6 points against Kansas. He won the NCAA basketball tournament Most Outstanding Player and was selected to that All-Tournament team. He was the fourth freshman to win the Most Outstanding Player award.

Davis was named the USBWA National Freshman of the Year. He was selected by the USBWA as the Player of the Year for its 10-man 2011–12 Men's All-District IV (Kentucky, Tennessee, Mississippi, Alabama, Georgia, Florida) Team. Davis was a first team selection to the NABC Division I All-District 21 team on March 14. On April 1, he was also awarded the Pete Newell Big Man Award and the NABC Defensive Player of the Year. CollegeInsider.com recognized him with the Lefty Driesell Award as Defensive Player of the Year and the Kyle Macy Award as Freshman of the Year.

==== Conference ====
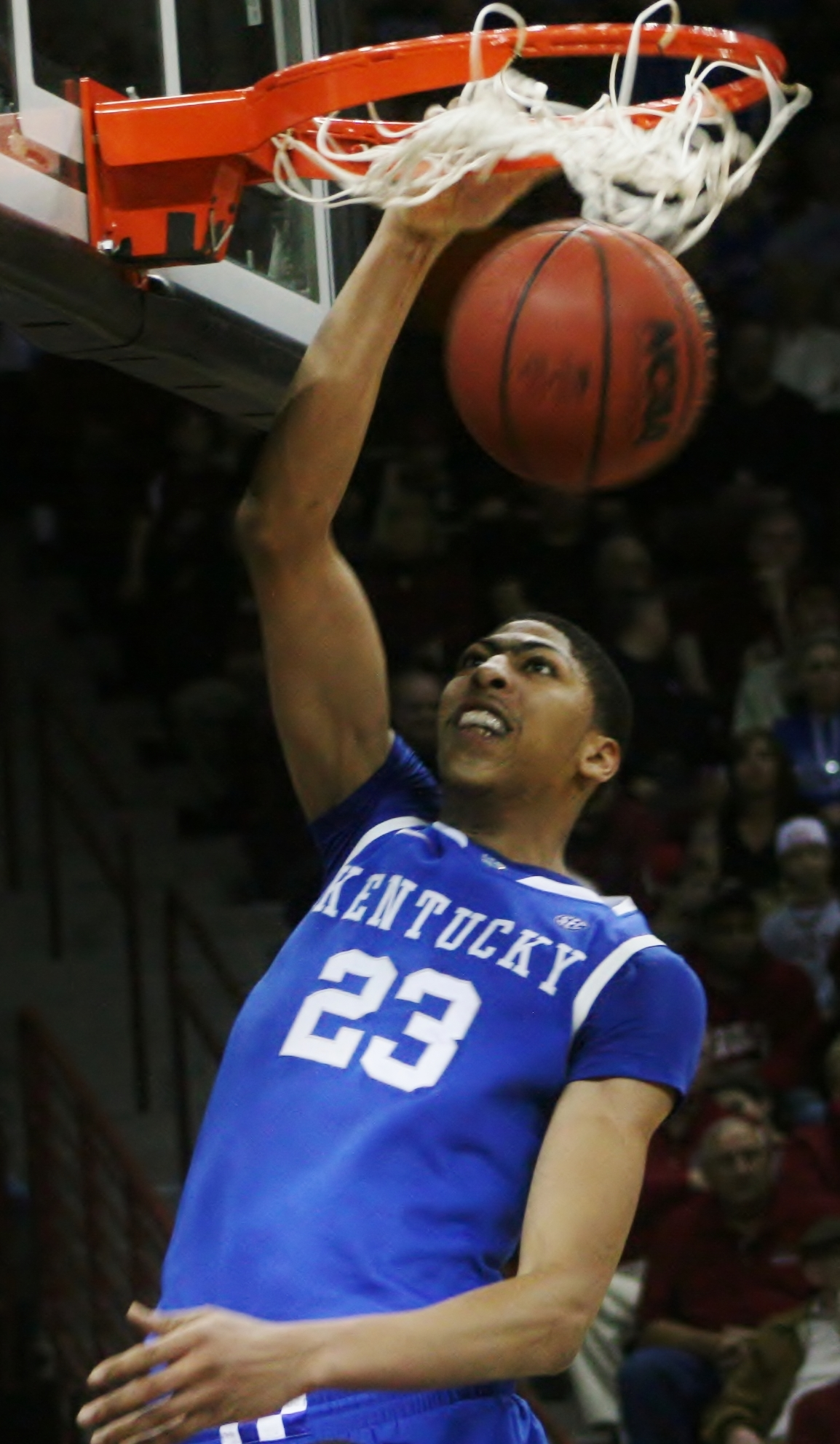
Davis as a Wildcat

Davis twice earned SEC Player of the Week (POTW) honors (Week of February 6 and 27, 2012) and four times, when he was not Player of the Week, he earned SEC Freshman of the Week (FOTW) honors (November 14, 2011, February 1, 2012, January 16, 2012, and May 3, 2012). He earned his first FOTW honor for debuting with a double-double, including 23 points, 10 rebounds, 5 blocks and 3 assists against Marist on November 11, 2011. Only Jones and Sam Bowie had previously had 20 or more points and 10 or more rebounds in their Kentucky Freshman debut. His second FOTW came in a week in which he averaged 14.0 points, 11.5 rebounds, six blocks, 1.5 steals and 1 assist in wins over Lamar and fourth-rated Louisville. His third FOTW award came when he averaged 16 points, 7 rebounds, 4 blocks, 2.5 steals and 2 assists in wins at Auburn and at Tennessee where both his point totals were game highs. He earned his fourth FOTW when he averaged 15.5 points, 10 rebounds and 4 blocks in wins over Georgia and at Florida. He earned his first POTW recognition for averaging 20 points, eight rebounds, 7.5 blocks and 2 assists in wins over Tennessee and at South Carolina. For Davis's second POTW he posted a pair of double-doubles to average 20.5 points, 11 rebounds, 3.5 blocks and two steals in wins at Mississippi State and over Vanderbilt. The February 25 win against Vanderbilt clinched the 2011–12 SEC championship for Kentucky as Davis tallied a career-high 28 points as well as 11 rebounds and 5 blocked shots. ESPN's Andy Katz described his SEC title-clinching performance as the most complete performance of his career.

He was also selected as the SEC Player of the Year, SEC Freshman of the Year, SEC Defensive Player of the Year and a first team All-SEC honoree. The SEC awards were selected by the league's 12 coaches who were not permitted to vote for their own players. Thus, no awards were unanimous. Sporting News also selected him as Freshman and Player of the Year for the SEC. Also, the Associated Press selected him as Player and Newcomer of the Year for the SEC as well as an All-SEC performer. Following the 2012 SEC tournament, he was selected to the SEC All-Tournament Team.

=== Records ===
During the 2011–12 NCAA Division I men's basketball season, Davis blocked more shots per game than most Division I men's teams. In the January 17 contest against Arkansas, Davis set the Kentucky men's basketball record for single-season blocked shots surpassing Melvin Turpin and Andre Riddick, who each had 83. In the game, he established a career high with 27 points and added 14 rebounds and 5 blocked shots. On February 4, against South Carolina, Davis established the SEC freshman record with 116 blocks surpassing Shaquille O'Neal's total set for LSU. One of the most notable blocks of the season was a block of John Henson with four seconds left to preserve a 73–72 victory when number one Kentucky hosted number five North Carolina on December 3. On March 15, Davis established a Kentucky single-game record for the NCAA Division I men's basketball tournament by blocking 7 against Western Kentucky. On March 25, Davis established the SEC single-season blocked shots record in the NCAA Tournament South Regional Championship game victory over Baylor, surpassing Jarvis Varnado's total of 169. On March 31, he tied DeMarcus Cousins with 20 double-doubles for the Kentucky freshman-season record. He also surpassed Cousins' Kentucky freshman rebounds record of 374 with 415 rebounds. With six blocks in the championship game, he achieved a total of 186 for the season, surpassing Hassan Whiteside's 2010 total of 182, to set an NCAA Division I freshman record. This also tied the NCAA Men's Division I Basketball Championship Game record for blocks established by Joakim Noah in the 2006 NCAA Division I men's basketball tournament. Starting in the championship game gave him a total of 40 starts for the season, which tied Kentucky's single-season record along with teammate Marquis Teague.

== Professional career ==
=== New Orleans Hornets / Pelicans (2012–2019) ===
==== Rookie year (2012–2013) ====
Davis declared for the 2012 NBA draft alongside the rest of the national championship team starting five: fellow freshmen Kidd-Gilchrist and Teague, and sophomores Jones and Doron Lamb. At the 2012 NBA Draft Combine, Davis measured at 6 feet 9.25 inches (2.06 m), 221.8 pounds (100.6 kg) and had the second-longest wingspan—7 feet 5.5 inches (2.27 m)—of any player participating. On June 28, the New Orleans Hornets selected Davis with the first overall pick. Davis became the fifth Chicago-area first overall selection following Cazzie Russell (1966), LaRue Martin (1972), Mark Aguirre (1981) and Derrick Rose (2008). On July 24, 2012, Davis signed a three-year $16 million guaranteed contract with the Hornets as prescribed by the NBA's collective bargaining agreement.

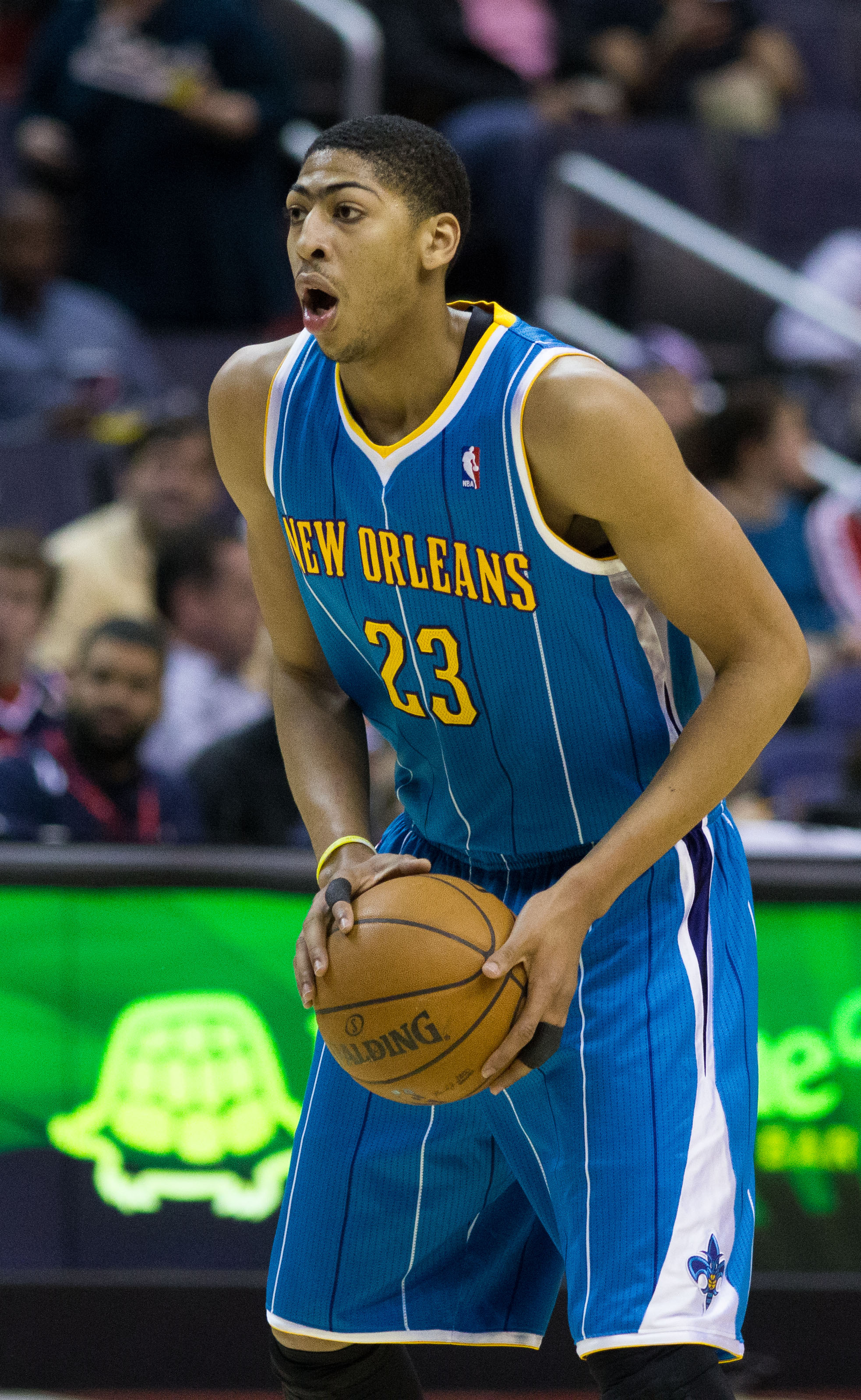
Davis in his first season as a Hornet

On November 1, 2012, Davis made his debut against the San Antonio Spurs. He scored a team high 21 in a losing effort. On November 2, Davis suffered a concussion that sidelined him for two-and-a-half games until November 9. In his November 9 return, he posted his first double-double with 23 points and 11 rebounds as well as 5 blocks, 2 steals and 2 assists in a victory over the Charlotte Bobcats. On November 17, he totaled 28 points and 11 rebounds against the Milwaukee Bucks. On November 20, Davis was announced to be out of the lineup for "a stress reaction" on his ankle. He was cleared to play on December 11, 2012, after missing 11 games. On December 18, he posted a career-high 4 steals to go along with 15 points and a then-career-high 16 rebounds against the Golden State Warriors in his first start since being disabled on November 20.

Davis appeared in the February 15, 2013 Rising Stars Challenge during the 2013 NBA All-Star Game weekend. Davis was removed from the Hornets' lineup on February 27 following a collision with Brook Lopez the prior night in which he sprained his left shoulder. On March 5, Davis returned to the starting lineup with 17 points, 15 rebounds and 4 blocked shots against the Orlando Magic. On March 9, Davis established a career high in rebounds with 18 to go along with 20 points against the Memphis Grizzlies. On March 20, Davis tipped in the game-winning basket over Kevin Garnett against the Boston Celtics with 0.3 seconds remaining. On April 10, Davis suffered a season-ending left knee medial collateral ligament sprain and bone bruise. He was injured in a collision with Marcus Thornton of the Sacramento Kings. He was a 2013 NBA All-Rookie First Team selection, and finished second in NBA Rookie of the Year voting (with 306 points) to Damian Lillard (605). His 20 double-doubles was the most in his rookie class.

As a rookie, he proved to be mostly a pick-and-roll threat on offense, but was effective in fast break transition and on the offensive boards. He needed to develop his isolation and post-up skills. His rookie skill set was said to resemble a young Lamar Odom, but he added over 10 pounds (4.5 kg) following his rookie season.

After the 2012–13 season, the Hornets renamed themselves the Pelicans. Davis donated $65,000 toward the construction of a basketball court at his alma mater, Perspectives. On October 16, 2013, during the preseason of Davis's sophomore year for the 2013–14 New Orleans Pelicans, the Pelicans exercised the team's third-year option on Davis's contract.

==== First All-Star selection (2013–2014) ====
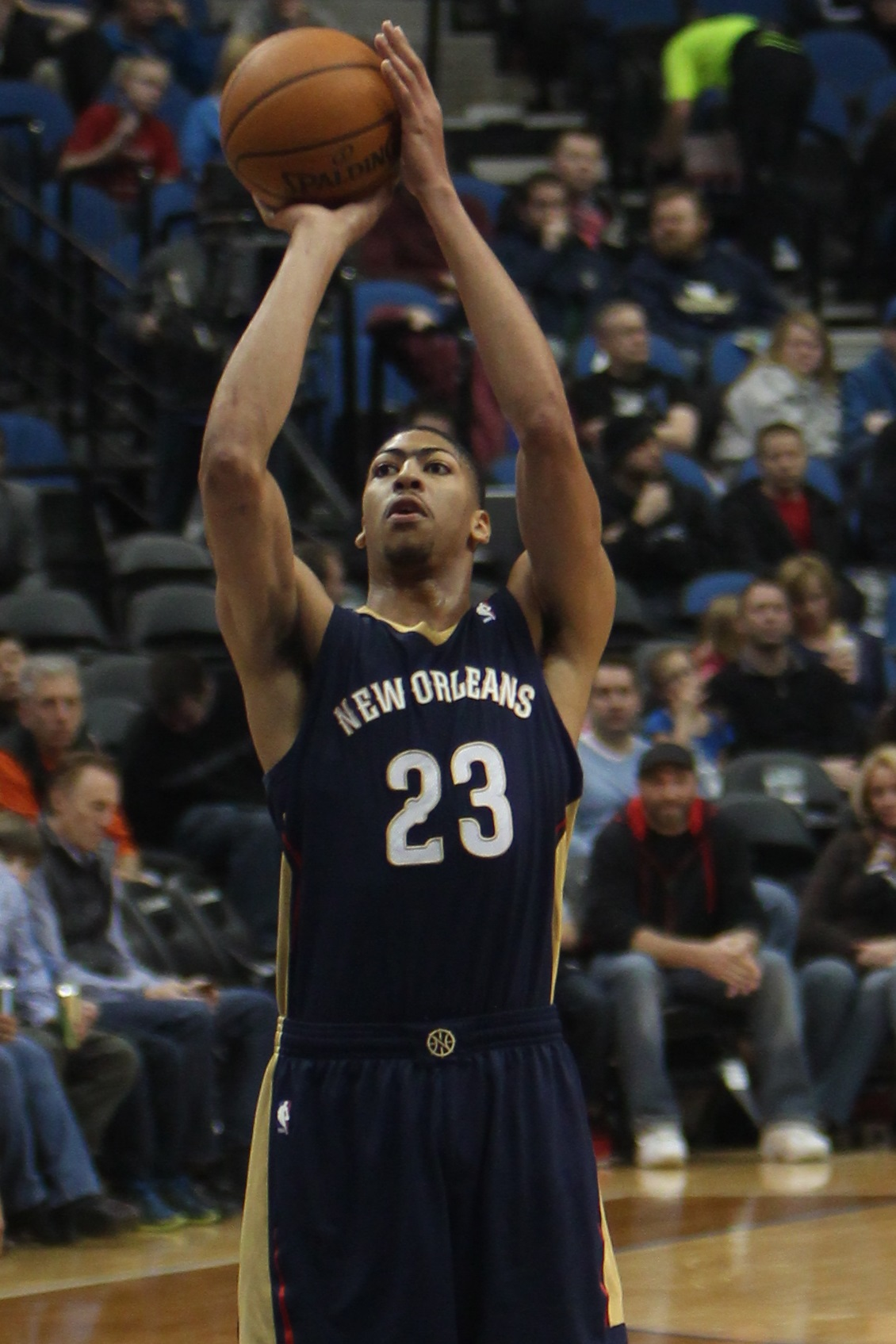
Davis shoots a free throw on January 1, 2014.

Davis began the 2013–14 NBA season with the newly-renamed Pelicans with a pair of double-doubles, posting 20 points and 12 rebounds against Indiana on October 30 and 26 points and 17 rebounds against Orlando on November 1. In the Orlando game, Davis became the youngest player in franchise history to record 25 points and 15 rebounds in a game. In the third game of the season against Charlotte on November 2, Davis established career highs with 6 blocks and 6 steals, while helping New Orleans to its first victory. He also became the first player with 6 blocks, 6 steals and 25 points in a game in the last 20 years and only the fifth with at least 5 blocks, 5 steals and 25 points in that period. For the week, Davis earned an NBA Player of the Week nomination, but lost out to Kevin Love. On November 8, against the Los Angeles Lakers, Davis scored a career-high 32 points and tied a career high with 6 blocks, along with 12 rebounds, becoming the youngest player ever to have at least 30 points, 10 rebounds and 5 blocks in an NBA game. On November 16, he established a new career high with 8 blocks against Philadelphia. He again had 8 blocks on November 20 against the Utah Jazz. With two 8-block games in the Pelicans' first 11 games of the 2013–14 NBA season, Davis matched the number of 8-block games that Roy Hibbert had at that time in the 2012–13 and 2013–14 NBA seasons combined. No other players had two 8-block games as recently. According to ESPN, while drawing a charging foul from Amar'e Stoudemire, Davis suffered a non-displaced fracture in his left hand in the first quarter against the New York Knicks on December 1. Yahoo! Sports claims the injury came on an attempted alley oop. On December 3, the Pelicans announced a four-to-six-week layoff was expected. The injury came the night before he was supposed to play in his hometown of Chicago, marking the second year in a row that he was sidelined for his chance to play in his hometown.

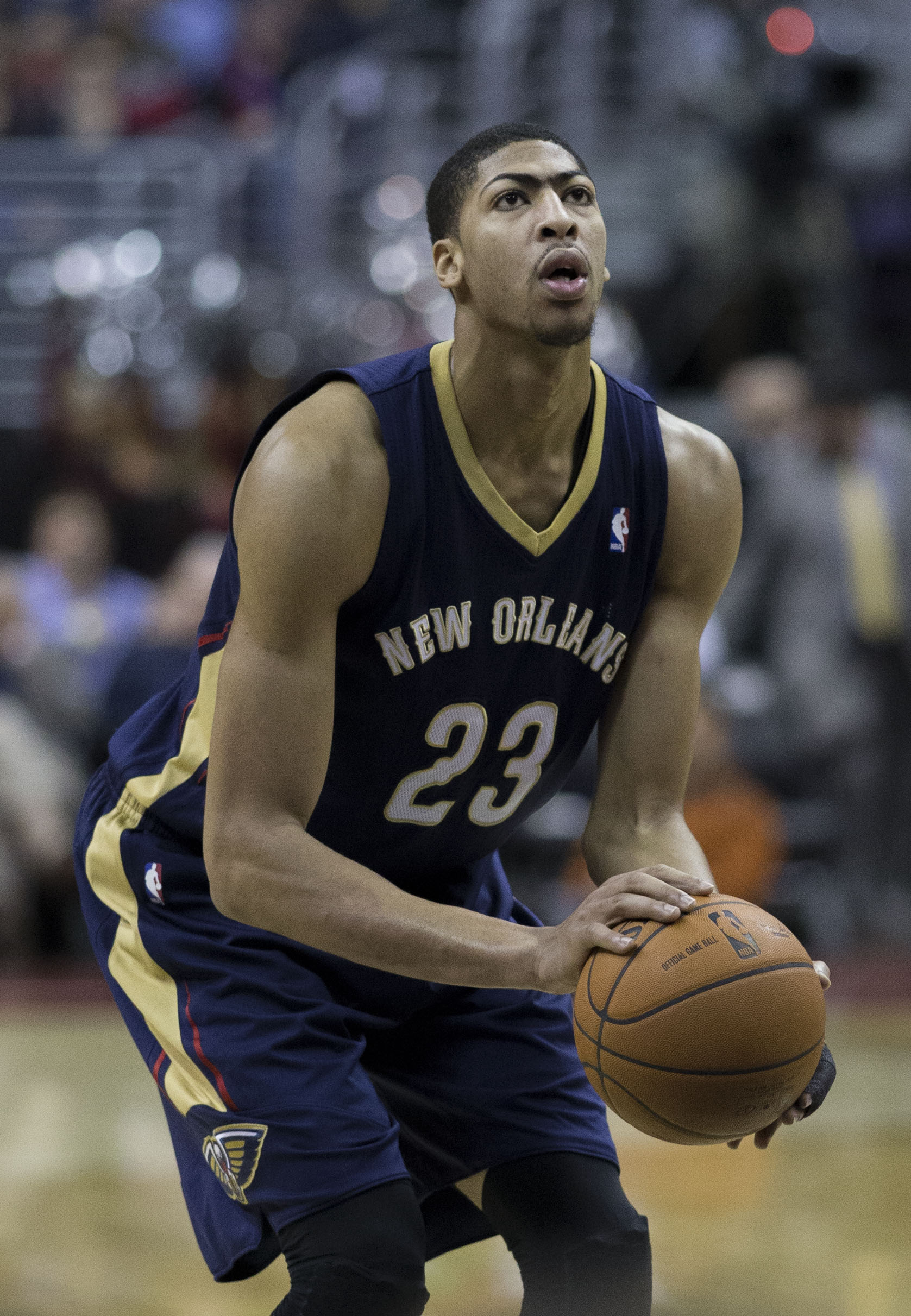
Davis in 2014

Davis returned to the lineup on December 18 against the Los Angeles Clippers with 24 points, 12 rebounds and 3 steals. He returned to the starting lineup in the next game with 21 points, 9 rebounds, 2 blocks and a steal against Portland on December 21. He missed 7 games due to the injury. In his seventh consecutive 20-point game (all losses), Davis posted 31 points and 17 rebounds against Golden State. In the subsequent game on January 20, he helped the Pelicans snap an 8-game losing streak with 27 points, 10 rebounds, 4 assists and 4 blocks against Memphis. On January 26, Davis established a new career high with 19 rebounds, in addition to posting 22 points and 7 blocks, in a 100–92 victory over the Orlando Magic. On January 27, Davis was a finalist for Western Conference Player of the Week but lost out to Kevin Durant. The January 28 contest against the Cleveland Cavaliers featuring the last three first overall NBA draft picks (Anthony Bennett, Davis and Kyrie Irving), Davis posted 30 points, 8 blocks, 7 rebounds and 3 assists. However, he dislocated his left index finger causing him to miss the next game the following night. On January 29, he was named a Rising Stars Challenge participant as part of the 2014 NBA All-Star Game weekend. On February 7, he was selected to replace Kobe Bryant in the 2014 NBA All-Star Game. On February 26, Davis sprained his left shoulder late in the first half against the Dallas Mavericks. He did not play in the rest of the game, and his subsequent availability was listed as day-to-day. Despite his shoulder sprain, Davis matched his career high with 32 points on February 28 against the Phoenix Suns. He was one of six Western Conference Player of the Week nominees on March 10. On March 14, Davis established a career high with 36 points against Portland. On March 16, 2014, (the very next game) Davis scored a career-high 40 points along with a career-high 21 rebounds in a 121–120 overtime win against the Boston Celtics. The performance was the first 40-point, 20-rebound effort of the 2013–14 NBA season. Davis was the fourth-youngest player (21 years and 5 days) to achieve 40/20 in a game and the youngest since Shaquille O'Neal in 1993. In addition to his career game, Davis set a New Orleans' franchise record with six straight games of at least 28 points. Glen Rice set the previous best stretch with five straight in the 1990s. It was also the first 40-point performance by a Pelican/Hornet since David West on February 26, 2010. Davis was again a finalist for NBA Player of the Week on March 17 and 24.

In late March, Davis began suffering a series of injuries. On March 28, Davis injured his left ankle, after four minutes of play against the Jazz. He missed the rest of the game and the next one. Davis returned to the lineup on March 31 against Sacramento. However, on April 2, Davis endured back spasms that caused him to miss the second half against the Nuggets. Davis saw limited minutes on April 4 and missed a game on April 9 due to his back. On April 10, the team announced that Davis would miss the remaining four games. Davis finished the season as the NBA leader in blocked shots per game (2.82). Davis was the youngest NBA leading shot blocker at 21 years, 36 days (on April 16, 2014). The record was surpassed 10 seasons later by Victor Wembanyama at 20 years, 101 days (on April 14, 2024). Because of his improved performance this season against his rookie season, Davis finished third in the NBA Most Improved Player Award voting behind Lance Stephenson and Goran Dragić.

==== First All-NBA and playoff appearances (2014–2015) ====
Davis began the 2014–15 NBA season against the Orlando Magic with one of the best season-opening performances of all time: 26 points, 17 rebounds, 9 blocks, 3 steals and 2 assists. It was the first 9-block season-opener since Nate Thurmond had 12 to open the 1974–75 NBA season. The performance also marked the first 26-point/17-rebound/9-block/3-steal effort since Hakeem Olajuwon during the 1989–90 NBA season. On November 8, against the San Antonio Spurs, he posted 27 points, 11 rebounds and 6 blocks, including the game-winning basket with 6.6 seconds remaining. It marked the 5th time Davis had 25 points, 10 rebounds and 5 blocks since the beginning of the prior season. No other player has had multiple such games in that time. On November 22, Davis scored a career-high 43 points along with 14 rebounds against the Utah Jazz. He was a finalist for October/November Western Conference Player of the Month. On December 2, Davis fell one assist and one block short of becoming the youngest NBA player to ever record a five-by-five with a 25-point, 10-rebound, 4-assist, 6-steal, 4-block performance against the Oklahoma City Thunder. Davis entered the December 12, 2014, contest against the Cleveland Cavaliers with a player efficiency rating (PER) of 32.9, which would be the highest in NBA history if maintained for the full season. Davis was injured in the game and left in the first quarter. Davis was sidelined in the subsequent contest. He was a finalist for December Western Conference Player of the Month. On February 6, despite having missed his last 11 three-point shots and having a career 2-for-23 three-point career record, Davis made a game-winning three-point buzzer beater against Oklahoma City Thunder as part of a 41-point, 10-rebound double-double. The 41-point performance marked a New Orleans record 13th consecutive 20-point performance, surpassing Pete Maravich of the 1976–77 New Orleans Jazz.

On February 7, 2015, Davis injured his shoulder after falling off the rim when he received an alley-oop. As a result of the injury, he withdrew from the 2015 NBA All-Star Game, and was replaced on the roster by Dirk Nowitzki and in the starting lineup by LaMarcus Aldridge. Davis missed five games in late February and early March to the shoulder sprain. He returned against the Detroit Pistons with a very dominant game performance of 39 points, 13 rebounds and 8 blocks, numbers that only Hakeem Olajuwon and Dwight Howard had achieved in a game in the prior 30 years. Davis also reached 437 career blocks, a franchise record. On March 9, Davis tied his career high with 43 points and added 10 rebounds, 2 blocks and a steal in a 114–103 win against the Milwaukee Bucks. On March 15 in a double overtime game against the Denver Nuggets, Davis became the first player in NBA history to tally 36 points, 14 rebounds, 9 blocks and 7 assists in a game since blocks became a statistic in 1973. Only David Robinson has had at least 30 points, 11 rebounds, 8 blocks and 7 assists in a game. On March 16, Davis earned Western Conference Player of the Week for games played Monday, March 9, through Sunday, March 15 and was a finalist for Western Conference Player of the Month of March. In the final game of the regular season, a must-win game that would send the Pelicans to the 2015 NBA playoffs, Davis recorded 31 points, 13 rebounds and 3 blocks in a 108–103 victory over the defending-champion San Antonio Spurs. The playoff berth was Davis's first and the franchise's first since 2011. Davis's season was one of the most impressive in NBA history, finishing the season averaging 24.4 points, 10.2 rebounds, 2.9 blocks, and leading the league in player efficiency rating with 30.89. He was a finalist for Western Conference Player of the Month again in April.

In his first career playoff series, Davis averaged 31.5 points, 11.0 rebounds and 3.0 blocks per game. Although swept by the overall number one seeded Golden State Warriors, who went on to win the NBA championship, Davis joined Shaquille O'Neal, Hakeem Olajuwon, and Karl Malone as the only players in the past 20 seasons to average 30 points and 10 rebounds in the playoffs. Davis also became the first player in 40 years to average 30 points and 10 rebounds in a player's first playoff series, with the only other players to do so being Wilt Chamberlain, Kareem Abdul-Jabbar and Bob McAdoo. At the end of the season, Davis finished 4th in the NBA Defensive Player of the Year Award voting, 5th in the NBA Most Valuable Player Award voting, sixth in the NBA Most Improved Player Award voting. He was selected to the All-NBA First Team for the first time in his career, becoming the first player to make the first team in his first three seasons since Derrick Rose did so in the 2010–11 NBA season. He was also an NBA All-Defensive Team second team selection.

==== Season-ending injury (2015–2016) ====
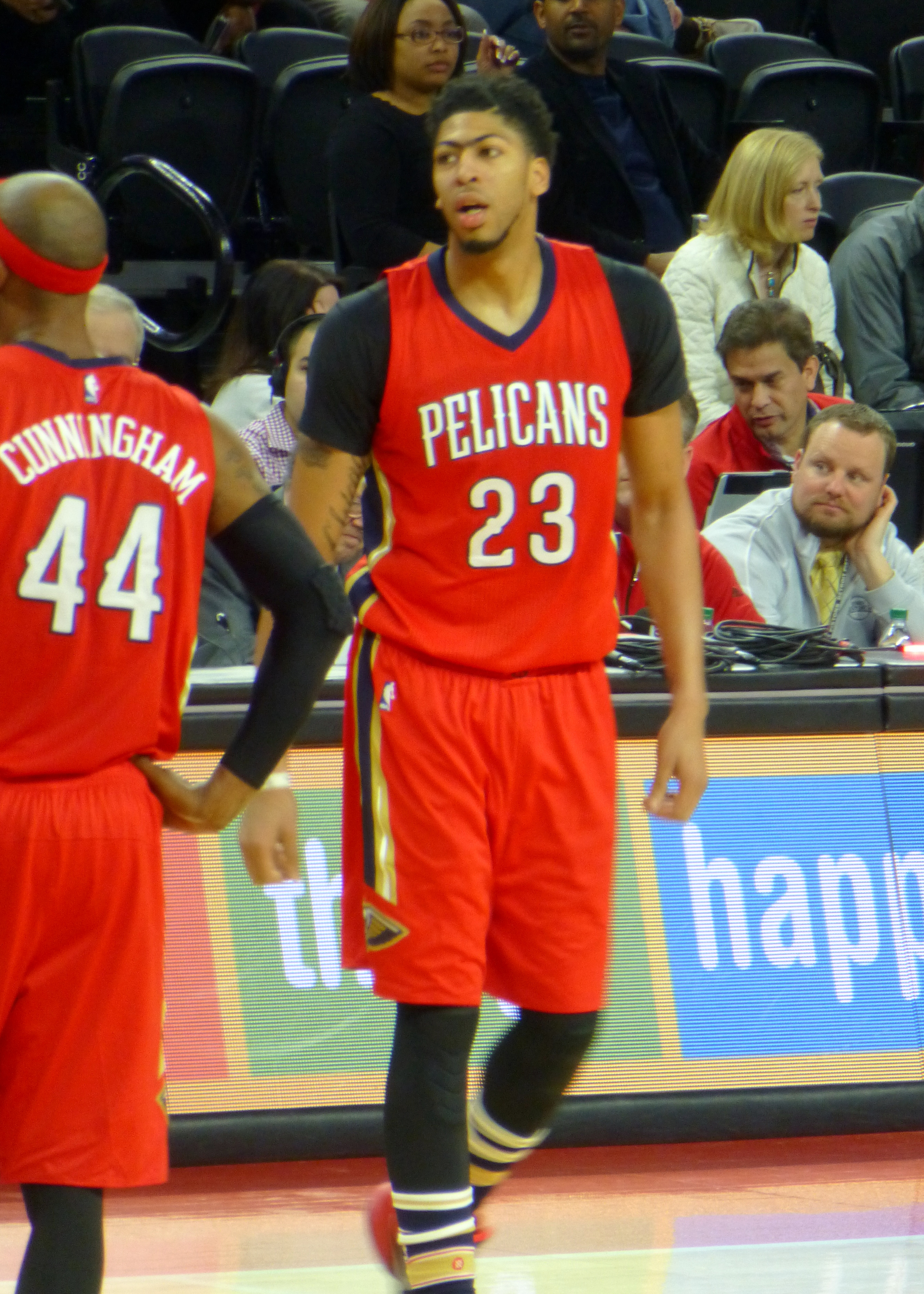
Davis during his 59-point, 20-rebound performance against the Detroit Pistons on February 21, 2016. His 59 points set a new franchise record.

On July 9, 2015, Davis signed a five-year, $145 million contract extension with the Pelicans. On November 6, he tied his career-high of 43 points in a loss to the Atlanta Hawks. On December 1, he tied a career-high 9 blocked shots in an offensive off night against the Memphis Grizzlies. On December 20, in a win over the Denver Nuggets, Davis scored a single-quarter career-high 19 first quarter points to finish the game with 27. On January 15, Davis converted an alley oop dunk from Jrue Holiday with 2 seconds remaining to give New Orleans a 109–107 victory over the Charlotte Hornets. On January 28, Davis was named as a reserve for the 2016 NBA All-Star Game. He again came close to a five-by-five with a 28-point, 10-rebound, 4-assist, 4-block, 4-steal effort on February 3 against the San Antonio Spurs. The following day, he was named to the NBA All-Star Weekend Skills Challenge lineup.

On February 21, in a win over the Detroit Pistons, Davis scored a franchise-record 59 points and pulled down 20 rebounds. The previous franchise record was 50 points by Jamal Mashburn exactly 13 years earlier against the Memphis Grizzlies. Davis joined Shaquille O'Neal and Chris Webber as the only NBA players with 50 points and 20 rebounds in a game since 1983. Davis also became just the 20th player in NBA history to score at least 59 points in a game, and became the youngest player in NBA history to score 59 points in a game, and the second youngest (behind Bob McAdoo) to record 50 points and 20 rebounds in a game. The 59 points was an NBA-wide season high at the time. The total was not surpassed until the final night of the season when Kobe Bryant posted 60 in his final career game. Davis posted a third 40-point game (40 points and 13 rebounds) on March 9 against the Charlotte Hornets. On March 20, he was ruled out for the rest of the season with a left knee injury and a torn labrum in his left shoulder. Upon being deactivated, Davis claimed that he had been playing through left shoulder pain since his rookie season.

==== All-Star record-breaker (2016–2017) ====
On October 26, Davis began the season with a 50-point, 16-rebound, 7-steal (career high), 5-assist, 4-block performance against the Denver Nuggets. He was one block short of his first five-by-five. It was the first 50-point, 15-rebound, 5-assist, 5-steal performance in NBA history since steals became an officially recorded statistic in the 1973–74 season. His 50-point night was the second highest scoring output of his career and was the most by any NBA player in a season opener since Michael Jordan scored 54 points in 1989. Two days later, he had 45 points and 17 rebounds against the Golden State Warriors, becoming the first back-to-back-game 40-point scorer in Pelicans history (since the New Orleans Hornets creation in 2002). On November 10, he scored 32 points against the Milwaukee Bucks, helping the Pelicans record their first win of the season after starting 0–8. On November 19, Davis posted 38 points and 16 rebounds, including 11 of the Pelicans' final 16 in an overtime win against the Charlotte Hornets. He posted the game-tying score with 18 seconds remaining in regulation. On November 23, he had a 45-point effort in a 117–96 win over the Minnesota Timberwolves; it was the Pelicans' fourth straight win. On December 23, he had 28 points, a career-high 22 rebounds and four blocked shots in a 91–87 win over the Miami Heat. On January 19, Davis was selected as a starter for the 2017 NBA All-Star Game, marking his fourth selection and second as a starter. On January 27, he had 16 points and tied a career high with 22 rebounds in a 119–103 win over the San Antonio Spurs.

On February 2, he was selected as a participant in the NBA All-Star Weekend Skills Challenge. On February 10, he had 42 points and 13 rebounds in a 122–106 win over the Timberwolves. Davis scored 40 for the sixth time this season, and it was his highest-scoring game since he put up 45 against Minnesota on November 23. On February 19, 2017, playing on his team's home floor for the NBA All-Star Game, Davis notched 52 points and 10 rebounds, breaking Wilt Chamberlain's previous All-Star record high of 42 points, and also won the game's Most Valuable Player award. This record has since been broken by Jayson Tatum in 2023. On March 11, 2017, Davis scored 46 points and grabbed 21 rebounds in a 125–122 overtime win over the Charlotte Hornets. On March 31, 2017, Davis had 19 points, 12 rebounds and five blocks in a 117–89 win over the Sacramento Kings. During the game, Davis became the first player in Pelicans history to reach 2,000 points in a season. Following the season, he edged out Rudy Gobert as the center on the All-NBA first team. He was also named to the NBA All-Defensive Second Team for the second time.

==== Second playoff appearance (2017–2018) ====
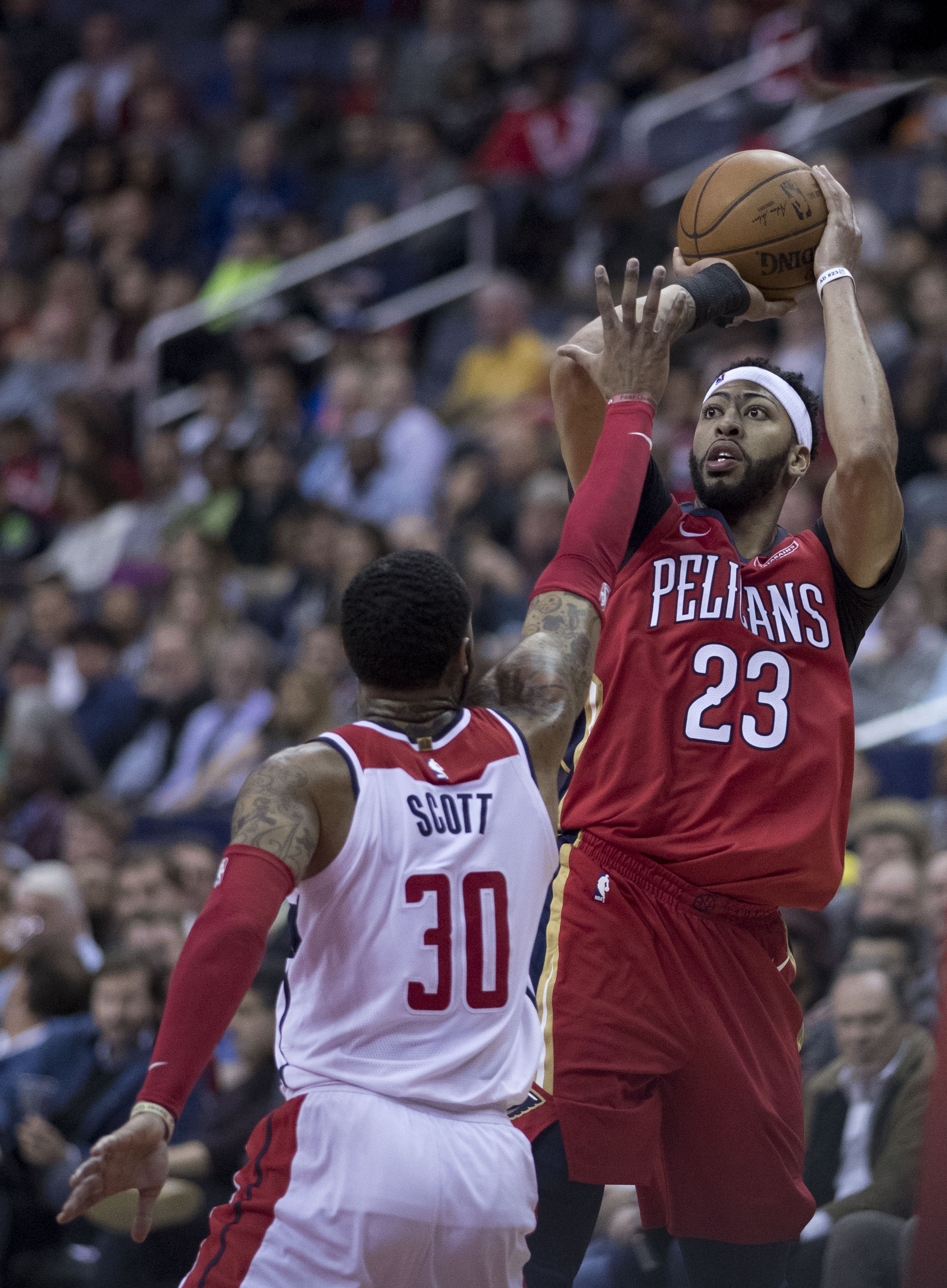
Davis shoots over Mike Scott of the Washington Wizards on December 19, 2017.

On November 22, 2017, Davis had 29 points and 11 rebounds in a 107–90 win over the San Antonio Spurs. He finished the game with 7,938 career points, moving him into second in franchise history ahead of Chris Paul (7,936). He was subsequently named the Western Conference Player of the Week for games played from November 20–26. Davis led the Pelicans to a 3–1 week behind averages of 29.5 points on .586 shooting from the floor, 12.5 rebounds, 2.8 assists and 1.3 blocks. Davis missed three games in early December with an adductor strain. On December 27, 2017, he had 33 points, 11 rebounds and six blocks in a 128–113 win over the Brooklyn Nets. On January 14, 2018, Davis scored a season-high 48 points and grabbed 17 rebounds, leading New Orleans back from 19 points down late in the third quarter to a 123–118 overtime victory over the New York Knicks. He followed that up with a 45-point/16-rebound overtime effort on January 16 to lead the Pelicans past the Boston Celtics 116–113. On January 18, he was named a 2018 NBA All-Star Game starter.

On January 28, he had 25 points and 17 rebounds in a 112–103 loss to the Los Angeles Clippers. Davis's rebound total gave him a franchise all-time high of 3,857, eclipsing David West's mark of 3,853. On February 2, he passed West as the franchise's all-time leading scorer by posting 43 points in a win against the Los Angeles Clippers giving him a total of 8,702. On February 23, he had 45 points, 17 rebounds, five blocked shots and five steals in a 124–123 overtime win over the Miami Heat. He hit a 3-pointer during the game, giving him a career-best 41 3-pointers in a single season. Three days later, he recorded a season-high 53 points, 18 rebounds and five blocked shots in a 125–116 win over the Phoenix Suns. In the game he made a franchise record 21 free throws. On March 6, he scored 41 points despite a rib contusion in helping the Pelicans defeat the Clippers 121–116. He also tied his career high with four 3-pointers and had 13 rebounds. Five days later, on his 25th birthday, Davis recorded his first career triple-double with 25 points, 11 rebounds and a career-high 10 blocks in a 116–99 loss to the Utah Jazz. His 10 blocks in a game set a franchise record and he tied his own franchise mark with six blocks in one half. Davis earned NBA Player of the Month for both the Month of February 2018 on March 1 and for the March/April time period on April 11. In the Pelicans' regular season finale on April 11, Davis had 22 points, 15 rebounds, four blocks and three steals in a 122–98 win over the Spurs.

In Game 1 of the Pelicans' first-round playoff series against the Portland Trail Blazers, Davis had 35 points, 14 rebounds, four blocks and two steals in a 97–95 win. It was the Pelicans' first postseason win since 2011 and the first of Davis's six-year career. In Game 4, Davis scored 33 of his franchise playoff-record 47 points in the second half, as the Pelicans completed a first-round sweep of the Trail Blazers with a 131–123 victory. In Game 3 of the Pelicans' second-round series against the Golden State Warriors, Davis recorded 33 points, 18 rebounds and four steals, as the Pelicans defeated the Warriors 119–100 to trim Golden State's series lead to 2–1. The Pelicans went on to lose the series in five games, with Davis recording 34 points, 19 rebounds and four blocks in a 113–104 loss in Game 5. At the end of the season, he finished 3rd in the NBA Most Valuable Player Award voting and 3rd in the NBA Defensive Player of the Year Award voting. Following the season, he earned his first NBA All-Defensive First Team and his third All-NBA First Team selections.

==== Requesting a trade (2018–2019) ====
In the Pelicans' season opener on October 17, Davis had 32 points, 16 rebounds and a career-high eight assists to go with three blocks and three steals in a 131–112 win over the Houston Rockets. On November 7, he had 32 points, 15 rebounds and four blocks in a 107–98 win over the Chicago Bulls. On November 12, he had 25 points and a season-high 20 rebounds in a 126–110 win over the Toronto Raptors. It was the fifth 20-point, 20-rebound game of Davis's career. On November 16, he scored a season-high 43 points and grabbed 17 rebounds in a 129–124 win over the New York Knicks. A day later, he recorded 40 points, eight rebounds and a career high-tying eight assists in a 125–115 win over the Denver Nuggets. On November 21, Davis missed the third of three free throws with 2.5 seconds left, as the Pelicans lost 121–120 to the Philadelphia 76ers. He finished with 12 points and 16 rebounds and reached 10,000 career points with a dunk late in the first half. He became the eighth-youngest player to reach the milestone at the age of 25 years and 255 days. Davis also recorded 5 steals, 5 blocks and 6 assists to achieve a five-by-five. On December 5, he scored 27 points to go with a career-high nine assists, five blocks and four rebounds (nine below his average) in a 132–106 win over the Dallas Mavericks. On December 12, he had 44 points and 18 rebounds in a 118–114 win over the Oklahoma City Thunder. On December 28, he hit a go-ahead, fall-away jumper with 43.9 seconds left and scored a season-high 48 points to lift the Pelicans to a 114–112 win over the Mavericks. On January 2, 2019, Davis posted a career-high and franchise-record 26 rebounds along with 34 points against the Brooklyn Nets. On January 14, he had 46 points and 16 rebounds in a 121–117 win over the Los Angeles Clippers. On January 19, he was ruled out for one to two weeks with a left index finger sprain, an injury sustained the previous night against the Portland Trail Blazers.

On January 28, Davis informed the Pelicans that he would not sign a contract extension in the coming off-season, and requested a trade. He was eligible to become a free agent in the summer of 2020. A day later, the NBA fined him $50,000 for making his request public. Davis recovered from his injury and was available to play, but the Pelicans said they would hold him out until after the league trade deadline on February 7. After the deadline passed without a trade, the team announced that Davis would play the rest of the season; they faced potential fines by the league if they held him out. On February 8, he played for first time since his trade request. He had 32 points, nine rebounds and three blocks in 25 minutes before being benched for the entire fourth quarter in a 122–117 win over the Minnesota Timberwolves.

=== Los Angeles Lakers (2019–2025) ===
==== First NBA championship (2019–2020) ====
In July 2019, the Pelicans traded Davis to the Los Angeles Lakers in exchange for Lonzo Ball, Brandon Ingram, Josh Hart and three first-round draft picks, including the Lakers' No. 4 overall selection in the 2019 NBA draft. Davis switched his jersey number to 3 because LeBron James already wore No. 23. Although James attempted to relinquish No. 23 to Davis, he was unable to change his number because Nike refused to allow it. He made his Lakers debut on October 22, 2019, against the Los Angeles Clippers, putting up 25 points, 10 rebounds and 5 assists in 37 minutes in a 112–102 loss. On October 29, he became the first Laker to put up a 40-point and 20-rebound performance since Shaquille O'Neal in 2003. Additionally, Davis did this in 30 minutes of play, which has never been done in the history of the NBA. In the game Davis set the NBA record for free throws in a quarter (18) and the Lakers record for free throws in a half (18) and game (26). On November 27, Davis made his return to New Orleans for the first time since the trade, recording 41 points and 9 rebounds in a 114–110 win over the Pelicans. The 41 points set an NBA record for the most points scored by a player in his first game against a former team. On December 8, Davis scored a season-high 50 points in a 142–125 victory over the Minnesota Timberwolves. On January 3, 2020, Davis had 46 points and 13 rebounds in a 123–113 win over the Pelicans. On January 5, Davis had 8 of the Lakers' 20 blocks against Detroit. Although 20 was one block shy of the franchise record, the team set an all-time NBA record for block percentage (25.6%) by blocking 20 of 78 shot attempts. On January 23, 2020, he was selected to be a front-court starter for the NBA All-Star Game.

In January 2020, Davis declined the Lakers' offer of a four-year, $146 million max extension, opting to enter free agency, where he could earn a five-year, $202 million max contract in the upcoming summer. On August 8, Davis had 42 points and 12 rebounds in a 116–108 win over the Utah Jazz to help the Lakers clinch the No. 1 playoff seed in the Western conference. Davis was the team leader in rebounds (9.3), blocks (2.3, 3rd in the NBA) and steals (1.5) for the season. He played in 62 of 71 games during the regular season and finished as a runner-up in voting for the NBA Defensive Player of the Year Award. In Game 2 of the Western Conference finals, Davis hit a game winning 3-pointer against the Denver Nuggets while putting up 31 points and scoring the last 10 points for the Lakers in a 105–103 win for 2–0 lead in the series. It was Davis second career (first in the playoff) game-winning buzzer beater. They advanced to the 2020 NBA Finals, where Davis and LeBron James led the Lakers to a 4–2 win over the Miami Heat for the franchise's 17th championship, tying them with Boston for the most in league history. Davis became the eighth player to achieve the basketball Triple Crown, and the first player to win an NCAA title, an Olympic gold medal, a FIBA World Cup, and an NBA title, Davis and James were the first teammates to be first team All-NBA since 2007.

==== Injury-plagued seasons (2020–2022) ====
On December 3, 2020, Davis re-signed with the Lakers on a five-year, $190 million contract that included an early termination option prior to the fifth season in 2024–25. For the 2020–21 season, he was sidelined for 30 games from February to April 2021, the longest absence of his career, due to right calf and heel issues. In the opening round of the playoffs, the Lakers were up 2–1 in the series against the Phoenix Suns when Davis suffered a strained left groin in Game 4. He was also sidelined in Game 5, when the Suns took a 3–2 lead. The Lakers were eliminated in six games, despite Davis playing only five minutes in the first quarter of a 113–100 closeout loss in Game 6.

When James switched his jersey number to 6 at the beginning of the next season, Davis had the opportunity to wear No. 23 again, but chose to stick with his current number, citing his desire to have No. 3 retired by the Lakers. On December 17, Davis exited in the third quarter of a 110–92 loss to the Minnesota Timberwolves after suffering an MCL sprain in his left knee. He missed 17 games before returning in late January, and for the first time since 2013 was not selected for the 2022 NBA All-Star Game. On February 16, 2022, in a 106–101 win against the Utah Jazz, Davis injured his right ankle and missed 18 games. In the 40 games he played during the season, Davis averaged 23.2 points, 9.9 rebounds, 3.1 assists and 2.3 blocks in 35.1 minutes of per game, and the Lakers missed the playoffs.

==== Return from injury and Western Conference Finals (2022–2023) ====
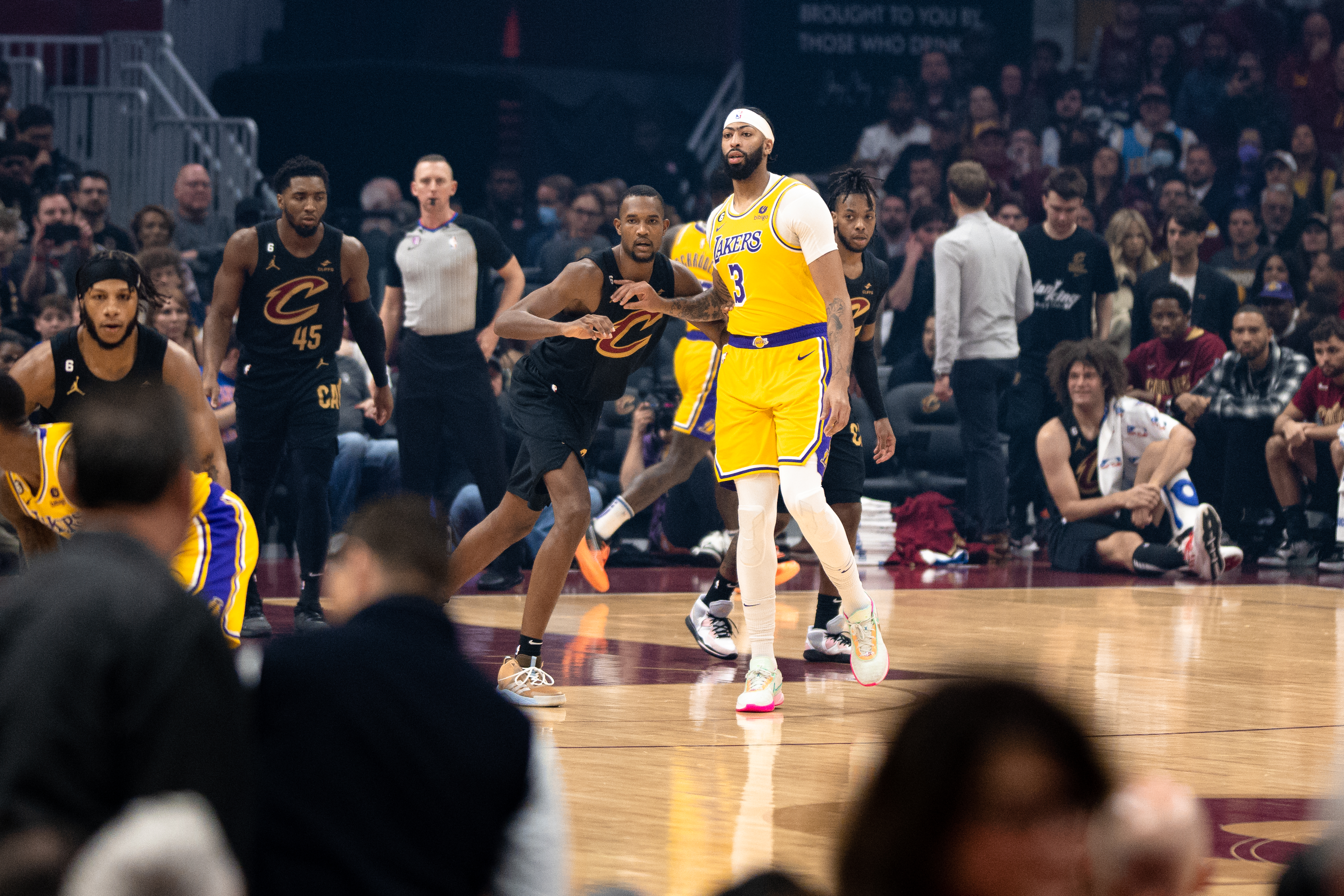
Evan Mobley and Davis

On November 13, 2022, Davis scored 37 points and grabbed 18 rebounds in a 116–103 win over the Brooklyn Nets, to help the Los Angeles Lakers snap a five-game losing streak. In the next game, Davis recorded a then season-high 38 points, 16 rebounds and 4 blocks in a 128–121 win over the Detroit Pistons. On November 22, Davis posted a then-season-high 21 rebounds along with 37 points, 5 steals and 5 blocks in a 115–105 loss against the Phoenix Suns. He became the first player since the 1973–74 season (when blocks and steals became an official stat) to record 35-plus points, 20-plus boards, 5-plus steals and 5-plus blocks in a game. It was his fourth consecutive game with 30-plus points and 15-plus rebounds. Davis also became just the third Laker in franchise history to record 30-plus points and 15-plus rebounds in four consecutive games, joining Elgin Baylor (had seven such streaks) and Shaquille O'Neal (November 19–26, 1999).

On December 2, Davis scored a then season-high 44 points, along with 10 rebounds, 4 assists and 3 blocks in a 133–129 victory over the Milwaukee Bucks. On December 4, Davis scored a season-high 55 points along with 17 rebounds and three blocks in a 130–119 win over the Washington Wizards. He joined Kevin McHale as only the second player in NBA history to put up at least 55 points, 15 rebounds and three blocks in a game since blocks became an official stat in the 1973–74 season. Davis became only the fourth player to score at least 99 points in a two-game span while shooting at least 70% from the field; Elgin Baylor had three of those streaks, Wilt Chamberlain had two and David Thompson had one. He also became the first Laker with back-to-back 40-point games since Kobe Bryant in March 2013. On December 5, Davis was named the NBA Western Conference Player of the Week for Week 7 (November 28 – December 4), his eighth career NBA Player of the Week award and first with the Lakers. He led the Lakers to 3–1 week with averages of 37.8 points, 13.0 rebounds and 3.25 blocks.

On January 25, 2023, Davis returned after missing the previous twenty games with a right foot injury. He posted 21 points, 12 rebounds and four blocks in 26 minutes off the bench in a 113–104 win over the San Antonio Spurs. On February 26, he led the Lakers to a 111–108 come-from-behind victory over the Dallas Mavericks with 30 points and 15 rebounds. It was the biggest comeback of the season at that time, and the Lakers' biggest comeback in franchise history since 2002. On March 5, Davis recorded 39 points, eight rebounds and six assists in an 113–105 win over the reigning champions the Golden State Warriors. On March 7, Davis put up 30 points and a season-high 22 rebounds in a 112–103 win over the Memphis Grizzlies. He also became the first Laker to drop multiple games with at least 30 points and 20 rebounds in a season since Shaquille O'Neal in 2003–04 season. On April 3, Davis was named NBA Western Conference Player of the Week for Week 20 (March 27 – April 2). Davis averaged 38.7 points (.652 FG%, .806 FT%), 11.7 rebounds, 1.0 steals and 2.0 blocks in three games, as the Lakers finished the week 3–0 with road victories over Chicago, Minnesota and Houston. He also earned NBA Western Conference Player of the Month for March/April on April 11, 2023.

In Game 1 of the Lakers' first-round playoff series against the Memphis Grizzlies, Davis recorded 22 points, 12 rebounds, three assists, three steals and a playoff career-high seven blocks in a 128–112 win. In Game 3 of the Lakers' first-round playoff series against the Memphis Grizzlies, Davis put up 31 points, 17 rebounds, two assists, two steals and three blocks in a 111–101 win. In Game 1 of the Lakers' second-round playoff series against the Golden State Warriors, Davis posted 30 points, a playoff career-high 23 rebounds, five assists and four blocks in a 117–112 win. He joined Tim Duncan as the only players in NBA history to put up at least 30 points, 20 rebounds, five assists and three blocks in a playoff game. In Game 1 of the Western Conference Finals, Davis recorded 40 points, 10 rebounds, three assists, three steals and two blocks in a 132–126 loss against the Denver Nuggets. The Lakers ultimately lost the series to the eventual NBA champion Nuggets in a four-game sweep. During the 2023 playoffs, Davis became the third Lakers player with 50 blocks in a single postseason, behind only Shaquille O'Neal and Kareem Abdul-Jabbar.

==== NBA Cup champion and final seasons with the Lakers (2023–2025) ====
On August 4, 2023, Davis signed a three-year, $186 million contract extension with the Los Angeles Lakers. On December 10, 2023, Davis won the inaugural NBA Cup with the Lakers after winning the 2023 NBA In-Season Tournament. Davis had 41 points on 16-for-24 shooting, 20 rebounds, 5 assists and 4 blocks against the Indiana Pacers in the championship game. Davis was recognized as a member of the All-Tournament team. On January 9, 2024, he scored 20 of his season-high 41 points in the fourth quarter on 13-of-17 shooting, 2-of-2 from three, 13-of-14 from the free throw line along with eleven rebounds and six assists in a 132–131 win over the Toronto Raptors. On January 13, Davis recorded his second career triple-double with 15 points, 15 rebounds, a career-high 11 assists and four blocks in a 132–125 loss against the Utah Jazz.

On February 1, Davis was named as reserve for the 2024 NBA All-Star Game, his ninth selection. On February 5, Davis put up his third career triple-double with 26 points, 15 rebounds, and 11 assists in a 124–118 win over the Charlotte Hornets. He also became the first player in Lakers franchise history to put up at least 25 points on 75% shooting, 15 rebounds, and 10 assists in a game. On February 29, Davis posted 40 points, 15 rebounds, four assists and three blocks in a 134–131 overtime win over the Washington Wizards. On March 10, Davis logged 27 points, a season-high 25 rebounds, a career-high seven steals, five assists, and three blocks in a 120–109 victory against the Minnesota Timberwolves; he became the first player in NBA history to record 25+ points, 25+ rebounds, 5+ assists, and 5+ steals in a single game. On March 16, he suffered an eye contusion in a game against the Golden State Warriors. The Lakers lost the game 128–121. On March 26, Davis recorded 34 points, 23 rebounds, two assists, two steals and four blocks, playing a career-high 52 minutes in a 128–124 double overtime win over the Milwaukee Bucks. In Game 4 of the Lakers' first round playoffs series against the Denver Nuggets, Davis posted 25 points, 23 rebounds, and 6 assists in a 119–108 win. The Lakers would go on to lose to the Nuggets in five games despite strong play from Davis.

In the Lakers' season opener on October 22, Davis logged 36 points, 16 rebounds, four assists and three blocks in a 110–103 win over the Minnesota Timberwolves. He had a perfect fourth quarter where he scored 11 points without missing a field goal attempt. Davis posted his 15th game as a Laker with 35+ points and 15+ rebounds – tying Wilt Chamberlain for the fourth-most in team history. The Lakers are 13–2 in those games. On October 25, Davis scored 35 points in a 123–116 victory against the Phoenix Suns. He became the 3rd Lakers player to make consecutive 35-point games during his first two season games, after Jerry West and Elgin Baylor. On November 15, Davis scored a season-high 40 points and grabbed 12 rebounds, including drilling two pivotal 3-pointers in the fourth quarter of a 120–115 win over the San Antonio Spurs. On December 6, Davis recorded 38 points, 10 rebounds and 8 assists in a 134–132 overtime loss against the Atlanta Hawks. On December 16, Davis tied his season-high with 40 points and grabbed 16 rebounds in a 116–110 win over the Memphis Grizzlies. On January 27, 2025, Davis opened the game against the Charlotte Hornets with 21 points and 11 rebounds in the first quarter, on his way to a 42 point, 23 rebound win. Ahead of the league's February trade deadline, he renewed calls for the Lakers to acquire a center, freeing him to play his preferred power forward position. On January 30, Davis was named as reserve for the 2025 NBA All-Star Game, his tenth selection.

=== Dallas Mavericks (2025–2026) ===
On February 2, 2025, Davis was traded, alongside Max Christie and a 2029 first-round pick, to the Dallas Mavericks in exchange for Luka Dončić, Maxi Kleber, and Markieff Morris. The Mavericks additionally traded a 2025 second round pick to the Utah Jazz, who also acquired Jalen Hood-Schifino and a 2025 second-round pick from the Lakers. The trade was regarded as one of the most significant and unexpected in NBA history, marking the first time two reigning All-NBA players were traded for each other midseason.

On February 8, Davis made his Mavericks debut, putting up 26 points, 16 rebounds, seven assists, and three blocks in a 116–105 win over the Houston Rockets. He also joined Dončić and Michael Finley as the only players to put up at least 20 points, 10 rebounds, and five assists in a half in Mavericks franchise history. Davis strained his left adductor in the game, however, which analysts expected to sideline him for multiple weeks. On March 17, Davis was assigned to the Texas Legends. After missing 18 games, Davis returned from injury on March 24 in a 120–101 win over the Brooklyn Nets. He hit a game-winning shot against the Atlanta Hawks on April 2, returning late after suffering an eye injury earlier in the game. Davis finished the game with 34 points, 15 rebounds and five blocks. He also joined Daniel Gafford as the only players in franchise history to record a game with at least 30 points, 15 rebounds and five blocks. On April 11, Davis recorded his fourth career triple-double with 23 points, 13 rebounds, 10 assists and a season-high 7 blocks in a 124–102 win over the Toronto Raptors. He became the first player in NBA history to post 20+ points, 10+ rebounds, 10+ assists and 5+ blocks in under 31 minutes. Despite Davis delivering a 40-point, 9-rebound performance in the Play-In Tournament game against the Memphis Grizzlies, the Mavericks were eliminated from playoff contention with a 120–106 loss.

On July 8, 2025, Davis underwent surgery to repair a detached retina in his right eye. On October 1, it was announced that Davis would need to wear protective goggles for the remainder of his career. On January 8, 2026, Davis suffered a left hand injury during a 116–114 loss to the Utah Jazz late in the fourth quarter and did not return. At the time of his departure, he had posted 21 points, 11 rebounds, and 4 assists. An MRI conducted the following day revealed ligament damage, raising initial concerns that surgery might be required. However, the team later opted for non-surgical treatment, with an expected recovery period of several weeks.

=== Washington Wizards (2026–present) ===
On February 5, 2026, Davis was traded, alongside Jaden Hardy, D'Angelo Russell, and Dante Exum, to the Washington Wizards in exchange for Khris Middleton, Marvin Bagley III, AJ Johnson, Tyus Jones, a 2026 first-round pick (via OKC), a 2030 protected first-round pick (via GSW), and three second-round picks. Davis chose to wear No. 23, becoming the first Wizards player to do so since Michael Jordan retired following the 2002–03 season. On April 7, it was announced that Davis would be out for the remainder of the season as a result of his hand injury.

On October 21, 2026, Davis made his Wizards debut, putting up 34 points, 12 rebounds, four assists, two steals, and one block in a 128–116 win over the Milwaukee Bucks. His 34 points tied Antawn Jamison's record for the most points in a debut in Wizards franchise history. On November 9, Davis scored a season-high 44 points and grabbed 13 rebounds in a 122–111 loss to the Detroit Pistons. He scored 30 points in the first half on 10-of-11 shooting, becoming just the fifth player in Wizards franchise history to score at least 30 points in a half.

== Awards and honors ==
Basketball Triple Crown

NBA

- NBA champion: 2020
- 10× NBA All-Star: 2014–2021, 2024, 2025
- NBA All-Star Game MVP: 2017
- 5× All-NBA Team selections:
  - 4× First Team: 2015, 2017, 2018, 2020
  - 1× Second Team: 2024
- 5× NBA All-Defensive Team:
  - 3× First Team: 2018, 2020, 2024
  - 2× Second Team: 2015, 2017
- 3× NBA blocks leader: 2014, 2015, 2018
- NBA All-Rookie First Team: 2013
- NBA Cup champion: 2023
- NBA Cup All-Tournament Team: 2023
- NBA 75th Anniversary Team

USA Basketball

- 2× Olympics gold medalist: 2012, 2024
- FIBA World Cup gold medalist: 2014

NCAA

- NCAA champion: 2012
- NCAA Final Four Most Outstanding Player: 2012
- National college player of the year: 2012
- Consensus first-team All-American: 2012
- NABC Defensive Player of the Year: 2012
- USBWA National Freshman of the Year: 2012
- SEC Male Athlete of the Year: 2012
- SEC Player of the Year: 2012
- NCAA blocks leader: 2012
- SEC Defensive Player of the Year: 2012
- SEC Rookie of the Year: 2012

High school

- First-team Parade All-American: 2011
- McDonald's All-American: 2011

== Career statistics ==
Legend
GP	Games played	GS	Games started	MPG	Minutes per game
FG%	Field goal percentage	3P%	3-point field goal percentage	FT%	Free throw percentage
RPG	Rebounds per game	APG	Assists per game	SPG	Steals per game
BPG	Blocks per game	PPG	Points per game	**Bold**	Career high
†	Won an NBA championship	*	Led the league

=== NBA ===
==== Regular season ====
Year	Team	GP	GS	MPG	FG%	3P%	FT%	RPG	APG	SPG	BPG	PPG
2012–13	New Orleans	64	60	28.8	.516	.000	.751	8.2	1.0	1.2	1.8	13.5
2013–14	New Orleans	67	66	35.2	.519	.222	.791	10.0	1.6	1.3	2.8*	20.8
2014–15	New Orleans	68	68	36.1	.535	.083	.805	10.2	2.2	1.5	**2.9***	24.4
2015–16	New Orleans	61	61	35.5	.493	.324	.758	10.3	1.9	1.3	2.0	24.3
2016–17	New Orleans	75	75	36.1	.505	.299	.802	11.8	2.1	1.3	2.2	28.0
2017–18	New Orleans	75	75	**36.4**	.534	**.340**	.828	11.1	2.3	1.5	2.6*	**28.1**
2018–19	New Orleans	56	56	33.0	.517	.331	.794	12.0	3.9	**1.6**	2.4	25.9
2019–20†	L.A. Lakers	62	62	34.4	.503	.330	**.846**	9.3	3.2	1.5	2.3	26.1
2020–21	L.A. Lakers	36	36	32.3	.491	.260	.738	7.9	3.1	1.3	1.6	21.8
2021–22	L.A. Lakers	40	40	35.1	.532	.186	.713	9.9	3.1	1.2	2.3	23.2
2022–23	L.A. Lakers	56	54	34.0	**.563**	.257	.784	12.5	2.6	1.1	2.0	25.9
2023–24	L.A. Lakers	**76**	**76**	35.5	.556	.271	.816	**12.6**	3.5	1.2	2.3	24.7
2024–25	L.A. Lakers	42	42	34.3	.528	.298	.788	11.9	3.4	1.3	2.1	25.7
2024–25	Dallas	9	9	29.6	.461	.233	.688	10.1	**4.4**	.6	2.2	20.0
2025–26	Dallas	20	20	31.3	.506	.270	.728	11.1	2.8	1.1	1.7	20.4
Career		807	800	34.4	.522	.295	.793	10.7	2.6	1.3	2.3	24.0
All-Star		7	3	17.3	.700	.143	.500	5.3	1.4	1.1	.6	18.4

==== Playoffs ====
Year	Team	GP	GS	MPG	FG%	3P%	FT%	RPG	APG	SPG	BPG	PPG
2015	New Orleans	4	4	**42.9**	.540	.000	**.889**	11.0	2.0	1.3	3.0	**31.5**
2018	New Orleans	9	9	39.8	.520	.273	.828	13.4	1.7	**2.0**	2.4	30.1
2020†	L.A. Lakers	**21**	**21**	36.6	.571	**.383**	.832	9.7	3.5	1.2	1.4	27.7
2021	L.A. Lakers	5	5	28.8	.403	.182	.833	6.6	2.6	.6	1.6	17.4
2023	L.A. Lakers	16	16	38.0	.520	.333	.852	14.1	2.6	1.4	**3.1**	22.6
2024	L.A. Lakers	5	5	41.6	**.634**	.000	.808	**15.6**	**4.0**	.4	1.6	27.8
Career		60	60	37.6	.542	.313	.840	11.8	2.8	1.3	2.2	26.1

=== College ===
*	Led NCAA Division I

Year	Team	GP	GS	MPG	FG%	3P%	FT%	RPG	APG	SPG	BPG	PPG
2011–12	Kentucky	40*	40	32.0	.623	.150	.709	10.4	1.3	1.3	4.7*	14.2

=== Records ===
NCAA

- Freshman-season total blocked shots (186)
- National Championship game blocked shots (6, tied)

SEC

- Single-season blocked shots (186)

Kentucky

- NCAA tournament single-game blocked shots (7)
- SEC tournament single-game blocked shots (6)
- Season-opener blocked shots (5)
- SEC season-opener blocked shots (7)
- Freshman field goal percentage (62.3%)
- Career blocked shots per game (4.65)
- Single-season blocked shots per game (4.65)
- Single-season blocked shots (186)
- Single-season games played (40, tied)
- Single-season games started (40, tied)

NBA

- Free throws made in a quarter (18)
- Single All-Star Game field goals made (26)
- Single All-Star Game field goals made in a half (15)
- Single All-Star Game field goals made in a quarter (10)

New Orleans

- Career points (11,059)
- Career rebounds (4,906)
- Career offensive rebounds (1,208)
- Career defensive rebounds (3,698)
- Career blocked shots (1,121)
- Career field goals made (4,153)
- Career two-point field goals made (3,972)
- Career free throws made (2,572)
- Career points/game (23.7)
- Career blocks/game (2.4)
- Career player efficiency rating (27.4)
- Career defensive win shares (25.6)
- Single-season field goals (780)
- Single-season 2-point field goals (730)
- Single-season free throws (519)
- Single-season defensive rebounds (712)
- Single-season blocks (200)
- Single-season points (2,110)
- Single-season points/game (28.1)
- Single-season blocks/game (2.9)
- Single-season player efficiency rating (30.8)
- Single-season defensive win shares (5.1)
- Single-game points (59)
- Single-game blocked shots (10)
- Single-half blocked shots (6, tied)
- Single-game rebounds (26)
- Single-game free throws (21)

Los Angeles

- Single-game free throws made (26)
- Single-half free throws made (18)

== National team career ==
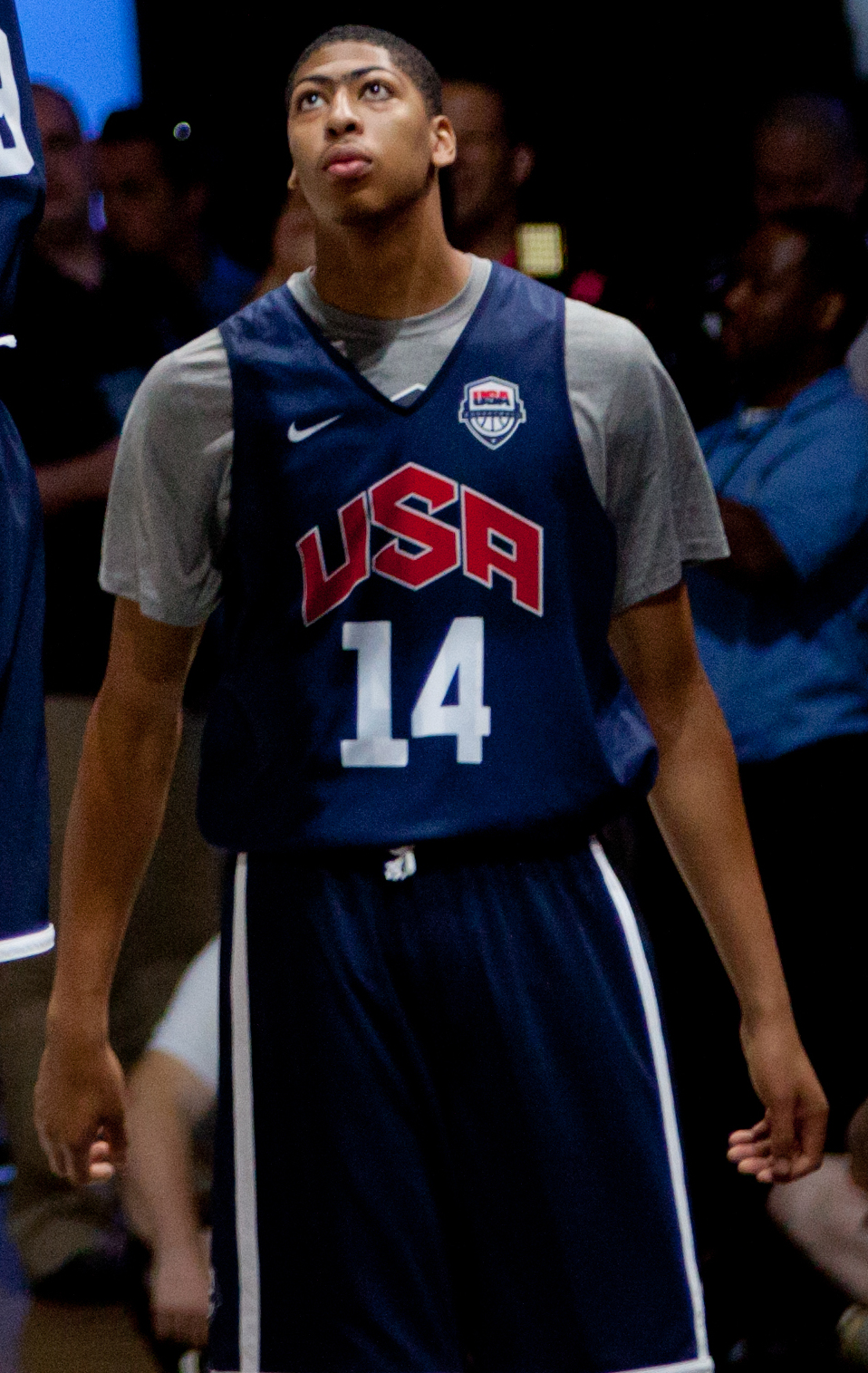
Davis with the 2012 U.S. Olympic team

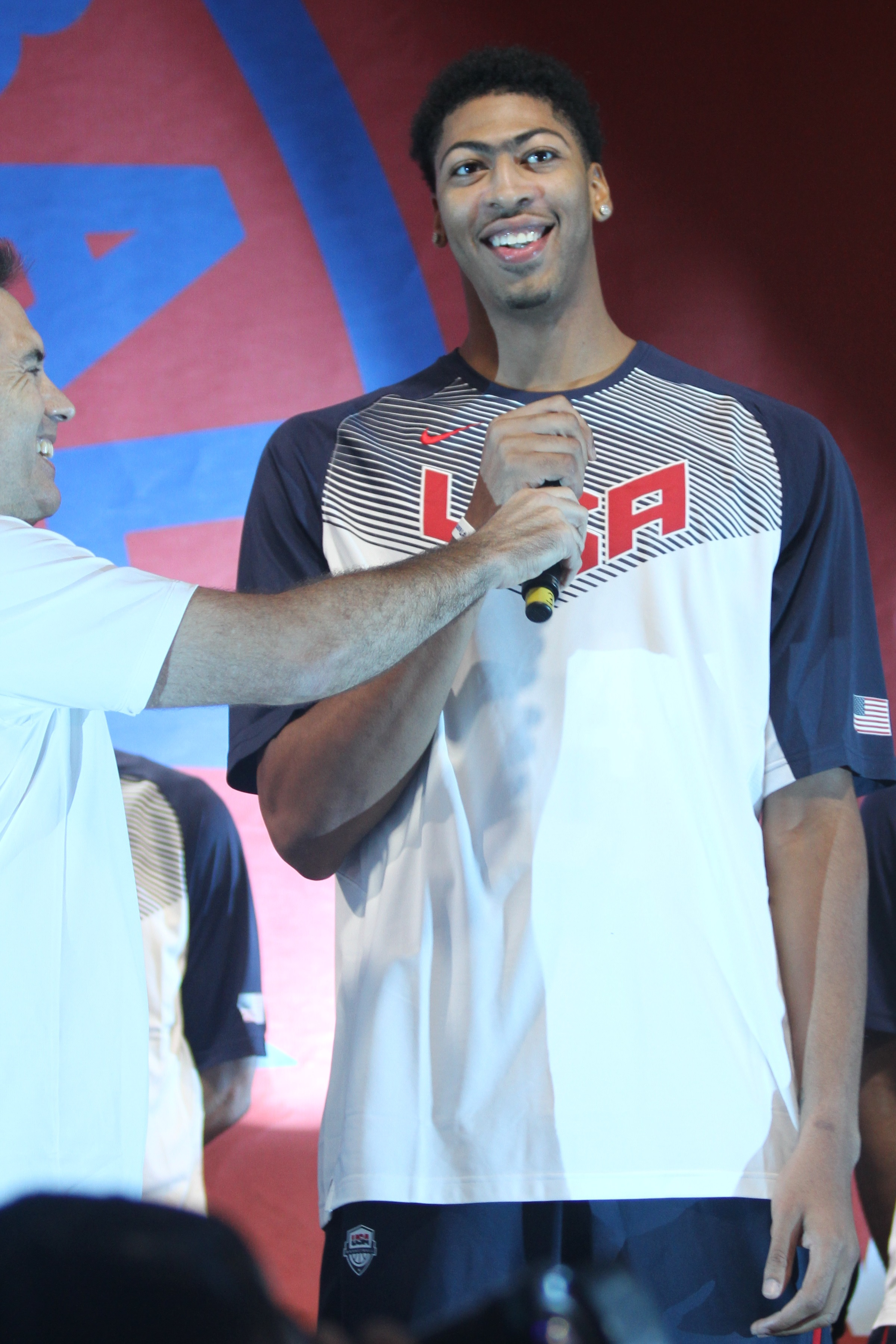
Davis fields a question from Matt Winer at the 2014 World Basketball Festival with Team USA.

On May 2, 2012, following a rash of injuries to players who had been on the 20-man Team USA basketball roster in January (notably center Dwight Howard), Davis was named as one of the finalists for the 2012 Olympic basketball team. Davis, along with Greg Monroe, was under consideration to fill the vacancy at center resulting from Howard's injury. Davis would be the first American player since Emeka Okafor (2004) to have competed in the Olympics without any prior NBA experience. By the beginning of July, he was one of six players (along with Blake Griffin, James Harden, Rudy Gay, Andre Iguodala and Eric Gordon) competing for the final three roster spots, according to USA Basketball director Jerry Colangelo. Tyson Chandler, Kevin Love, Griffin and Davis were the only true post players among the final 15. It was reported that Davis "suffered a severely sprained ankle in a workout" on June 30 and "almost assuredly [would] bypass a chance to play for Team USA [that] summer in the London Olympics." On July 12, 2012, however, he was selected for the Olympic team after Griffin suffered an injury to the same knee he injured in the 2012 NBA playoffs, making him the only college player on the team. The team went undefeated in London and won the gold medal match over Spain.

Davis was also a member of the 2014 national team that won the gold medal in the 2014 FIBA Basketball World Cup over Serbia on September 14. He averaged 12.3 points, 6.6 rebounds and 2.1 blocks per game in 9 games played, while shooting 54.9% from the field. On April 15, 2024, Davis was named to the 2024 U.S. Olympic team, returning to the national team after a 10-year gap. He helped Team USA win the gold medal, and in six games, he averaged 8.3 points, 6.7 rebounds, 2.0 assists, 1.2 steals and a team-high 1.5 blocks per game while shooting 62.5% from the field.

== Esports career ==
antdavis3

Personal information
- Name: Anthony Davis

Current team
- Team: FaZe Clan Nuke Squad
- Game: Call of Duty

Career information
- Playing career: 2022–present

Team history
- 2022–: FaZe Clan Nuke Squad

On June 19, 2022, Davis signed with FaZe Clan, joining Faze Clan's Nuke Squad for Call of Duty.

== Personal life ==
Davis is the son of Anthony Davis Sr. Davis Sr. is 6 feet 3 inches (1.91 m), and his mother, Erainer, is 6 feet 1 inch (1.85 m). He has a twin sister, Antoinette and an older sister, Lesha who played basketball at Daley College. He has cousins named Jarvis, Marshaun and Keith Chamberlain. Keith has played professional basketball in Germany and Latvia and their father, Keith Sr., served as Davis's elementary school athletic director.

Davis married Marlen Polanco on September 18, 2021. They have three children together.

On June 15, 2012, he signed with Arn Tellem and Thad Foucher of the Wasserman Media Group as his agents. Tellem left to become an NBA executive in 2015, and Davis signed with Rich Paul of Klutch Sports Group in 2018. Davis trademarked his unibrow sayings "Fear The Brow" and "Raise The Brow" in June 2012. In 2014, he launched AD's Flight Academy, which holds charitable events in the Greater-New Orleans area.

== Filmography ==
=== Film ===
Year	Title	Role	Notes
2016	Barbershop: The Next Cut	Himself	
2021	Space Jam: A New Legacy	Himself, Voice of The Brow	
2023	House Party	Himself	

=== Television ===
Year	Title	Role	Notes
2020	SpongeBob SquarePants	Himself	Episode: "SpongeBob Appreciation Day: Patchy's Beach Bash!"
2023	Impractical Jokers	Himself	Episode: "Anthony Davis"

== See also ==
- List of NBA franchise career scoring leaders
- List of NBA annual blocks leaders
- List of NBA single-game blocks leaders
- List of NBA career blocks leaders
- List of NCAA Division I men's basketball season blocks leaders
