= Klutch Sports Group =

American sports agency based in, California

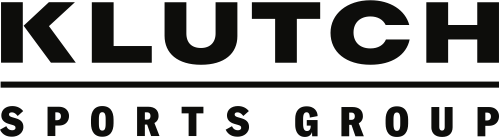
- Industry: Sports management
- Founded: 2012
- Headquarters: Los Angeles, California, U.S.
- Area served: Worldwide
- Key people: Rich Paul (CEO); Fara Leff (COO); Nicole Lynn (President of Football)
- Number of employees: 100 (2024)
- Divisions: Klutch Baseball; Basketball – men; Basketball – women; Football; Klutch Global Football (soccer); Global Partnerships
- Website: unitedtalent.com/klutch

Klutch Sports Group is an American sports agency based in Los Angeles, California, founded by entrepreneur, sports agent, and chief executive officer Rich Paul. Klutch Sports Group represents nearly 200 players in the NBA, NFL, MLB, and WNBA. It has offices in Atlanta, Cleveland, Los Angeles, Nashville, and New York. In mid-2024, Klutch Sports Group began expanding into Europe following the takeover of a major German soccer agency.

== History ==
Klutch Sports Group was founded in 2012 by Rich Paul.

In 2003, after the NBA draft, LeBron James asked Paul to be a part of his small inner circle, along with James' childhood friends Maverick Carter and Randy Mims. Paul quickly obliged. He would later start working under Leon Rose, who had negotiated James' extension with the Cavaliers in 2006, at Creative Artists Agency (CAA).

In 2012, Paul left Rose and Creative Artists Agency to start his own agency, Klutch Sports Group. His first clients were James, Eric Bledsoe, Tristan Thompson, and Cory Joseph.

In 2013, Paul enlisted agent and attorney Mark Termini to run the NBA contract negotiations for Klutch.

In 2016 and 2017, Fara Leff was already known as Klutch Sports Group's chief operating officer (COO).

In 2019, United Talent Agency (UTA) made a "significant" financial investment in Klutch Sports Group. According to Jeremy Zimmer, chief executive officer (CEO) of United Talent Agency, Paul "maintains control as operator of his business". United Talent Agency asked Paul to run its sports division through a partnership with Klutch and expand to represent NFL and WNBA players.

In 2020, Paul accepted a position on United Talent Agency's board of directors. Paul also expanded its clientele at Klutch to include the National Football League (NFL) by hiring former player Damarius Bilbo. Bilbo was chosen to lead the Football division of Klutch Sports Group. In April 2020, Klutch Sports Group acquired Tidal Sports Group from San Clemente, marking its "entry into baseball representation". Tidal Sports Group founder Brodie Scoffield was named to lead Klutch's Baseball division. Also, in 2020, NBA agent Omar Wilkes became head of the Basketball division of Klutch Sports. By the conclusion of their agreement in 2020, Termini had negotiated $1.4 billion in NBA contracts for Klutch Sports clients from 2014 through 2019.

In 2021, Klutch Sports Group was named among Time magazine's 100 Most Influential Companies. That same year, Klutch hired sports agent Nicole Lynn as president of Football operations.

In February 2020, Klutch Sports Group launched its Women's Basketball division, led soon after by Jade-Li English.

In the summer of 2023, Klutch Sports Group contracts worth almost $900 million were concluded just for Paul's NBA clients. In December 2023, Klutch acquired the baseball agency, Rep 1. Rep 1 CEO Chris Koras was named head of Klutch Baseball. By October 2023, Klutch Sports Group had nearly 200 professional athletes on its NBA, WNBA, NFL, and MLB rosters.

Klutch Sports Group had more than 100 employees as of mid-2024, with offices in Atlanta, Los Angeles, Nashville, New York, and Cleveland. In June 2024, United Talent Agency acquired Germany's biggest soccer player agency, Representatives Of Outstanding Footballers (ROOF), and integrated it into Klutch Sports Group. The soccer agency, which has offices in Munich, London, and Madrid, represents 150 clients in the "Big Five" European leagues: the German Bundesliga, English Premier League, Spanish La Liga, French Ligue 1, and Italian Serie A. Björn Bezemer, co-founder and managing director of Representatives Of Outstanding Footballers, was appointed head of Klutch Global Football. In early September 2024, it was announced that New York City FC (soccer) had tapped Klutch Sports Group to coordinate partnerships for Etihad Park, a new 25,000-seat soccer-specific stadium in Queens, New York, slated to open in 2027. Klutch, through its Global Partnerships division, will sell NYCFC's primary sponsorship program, the "Founding Partnerships", to interested brands.

== Athletes ==
=== NBA ===
Klutch Sports represents the following NBA athletes:

- Lonzo Ball
- MarJon Beauchamp
- Eric Bledsoe
- Miles Bridges
- Troy Brown Jr.
- Kentavious Caldwell-Pope
- Jordan Clarkson
- Anthony Davis
- De'Aaron Fox
- Darius Garland
- Aaron Gordon
- Draymond Green
- Jaden Hardy
- Montrezl Harrell
- Talen Horton-Tucker
- LeBron James
- Bronny James
- Keldon Johnson
- Christian Koloko
- Zach LaVine
- Jalen Lecque
- Tyrese Maxey
- Ben McLemore
- Dejounte Murray
- Kendrick Nunn
- Jusuf Nurkić
- Scotty Pippen Jr.
- Terrence Ross
- Collin Sexton
- Juan Toscano-Anderson
- Gary Trent Jr.
- Jarred Vanderbilt
- Fred VanVleet
- Lonnie Walker
- Justin Edwards

=== NFL ===
Klutch Sports has represented the following NFL athletes, either currently or formerly:

- DeAndre Hopkins
- Tremayne Anchrum
- Christian Barmore
- Camryn Bynum
- Rasul Douglas
- Dez Fitzpatrick
- Matt Judon
- Bryce Hall
- Kylin Hill
- Jalen Hurts
- Odell Beckham Jr.
- Alex Leatherwood
- Kellen Mond
- Myles Garrett
- Donovan Peoples-Jones
- Michael Pierce
- Bijan Robinson
- Quincy Roche
- Laviska Shenault
- DeVonta Smith
- Ke'Shawn Vaughn
- Montez Sweat
- Jedrick Wills
- Marvin Wilson
- Chase Young

=== NCAA Men's Basketball ===
Klutch Sports represents the following men's college basketball athletes:

- Nolan Hickman
- Jackson Shelstad
- Jaylin Stewart

=== NCAA Women's Basketball ===
- JuJu Watkins

=== Motorsports ===
- Josef Newgarden

=== WNBA ===
- A'ja Wilson
- Naz Hillmon
- Jordin Canada
- Chelsea Gray
- Jewell Loyd
- Allisha Gray

=== Soccer ===
- Folarin Balogun
