= 550 (disambiguation) =

550 may refer to:

- 550, a year in the Common Era
- 550 BC, a year Before the Common Era
- 550 (number), a number
- 550 AM, an AM radio frequency
- 550, the FTP error code meaning "Requested action not taken. File unavailable (e.g., file not found, no access)."
- 550 Music, a record label
- SIG SG 550, an assault rifle
- 550 cord, a type of parachute cord
- 550 Broad Street, an office building in Newark, New Jersey in the United States
- Radeon RX 550, a GPU designed by AMD
- New Balance 550, a shoe

== Transportation ==
- Tin Yat stop, one of the MTR Light Rail stops which has the MTR code 550

=== Vehicles ===
- Kawasaki JS550, a jet ski produced by Kawasaki Motors
- Porsche 550, a racing sports car produced by Porsche
- Ferrari 550 Maranello, a grand tourer produced by Ferrari
- BMW M550d, an executive car produced by BMW
- Roewe 550, also known as the MG 550, a compact sedan produced by SAIC Motor
- Gulfstream G550, marketing name of an aircraft produced by Gulfstream Aerospace
- Gulfstream Peregrine, company model number 550, a prototype single-engine business jet
