= New Balance 480 =

Line of shoes by New Balance

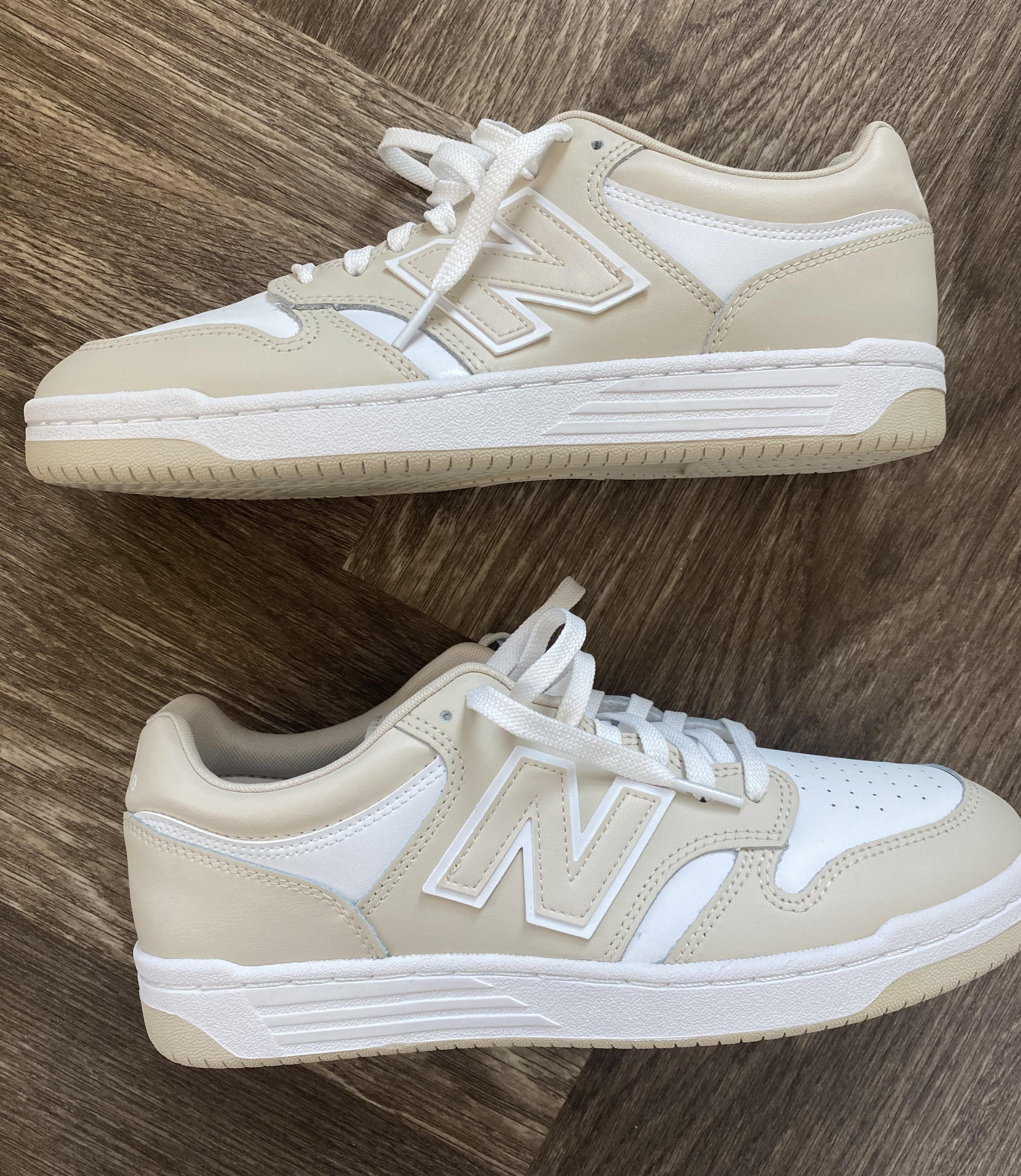
- Type: Sneakers
- Inventor: New Balance
- Inception: 1983; 43 years ago
- Manufacturer: New Balance
- Available: Yes

New Balance 480 is a basketball shoe produced by New Balance. It is the first basketball shoe created by the company and comes in a high top and low top model.

== Overview ==
The current 480 shoe line is actually a merger of two different shoe models, the New Balance Pride 480 and New Balance BB680. The Pride 480 is the first ever basketball shoe created by New Balance in 1983 and was released as a high top. A different model that was created as a low top version known as the BB680 was later released. Despite technically being different models, they are the same shoe just in different top heights. This is similar to the Pride 650 (high top) and P550 Oxford (low top) being the same shoe (now known as the New Balance 550).

At this point, the company was mainly known for creating running shoes and it wanted to expand into other sports. Seeing the popularity of basketball, it decided to enter the market by developing a basketball shoe. The shoe was developed to have better traction on the court and good breathability in the toe box. The shoe proved successful for the company and led to them creating more models for the sport.

In 2010, New Balance released a special model that was made to withstand a winter environment and cold climate. The shoe was only released in a high top and used the BB680 name. The shoe featured a more rugged upper and sole to protect from the weather and included metal eyelets and boot laces.

After the success of the 550 reintroduction in 2020, New Balance decided to relaunch the 480 as a lifestyle shoe in 2021. New Balance partnered with Junya Watanabe to produce a special colorway of the shoe which was soon followed by general releases.

== Models ==
=== Numeric 480 ===
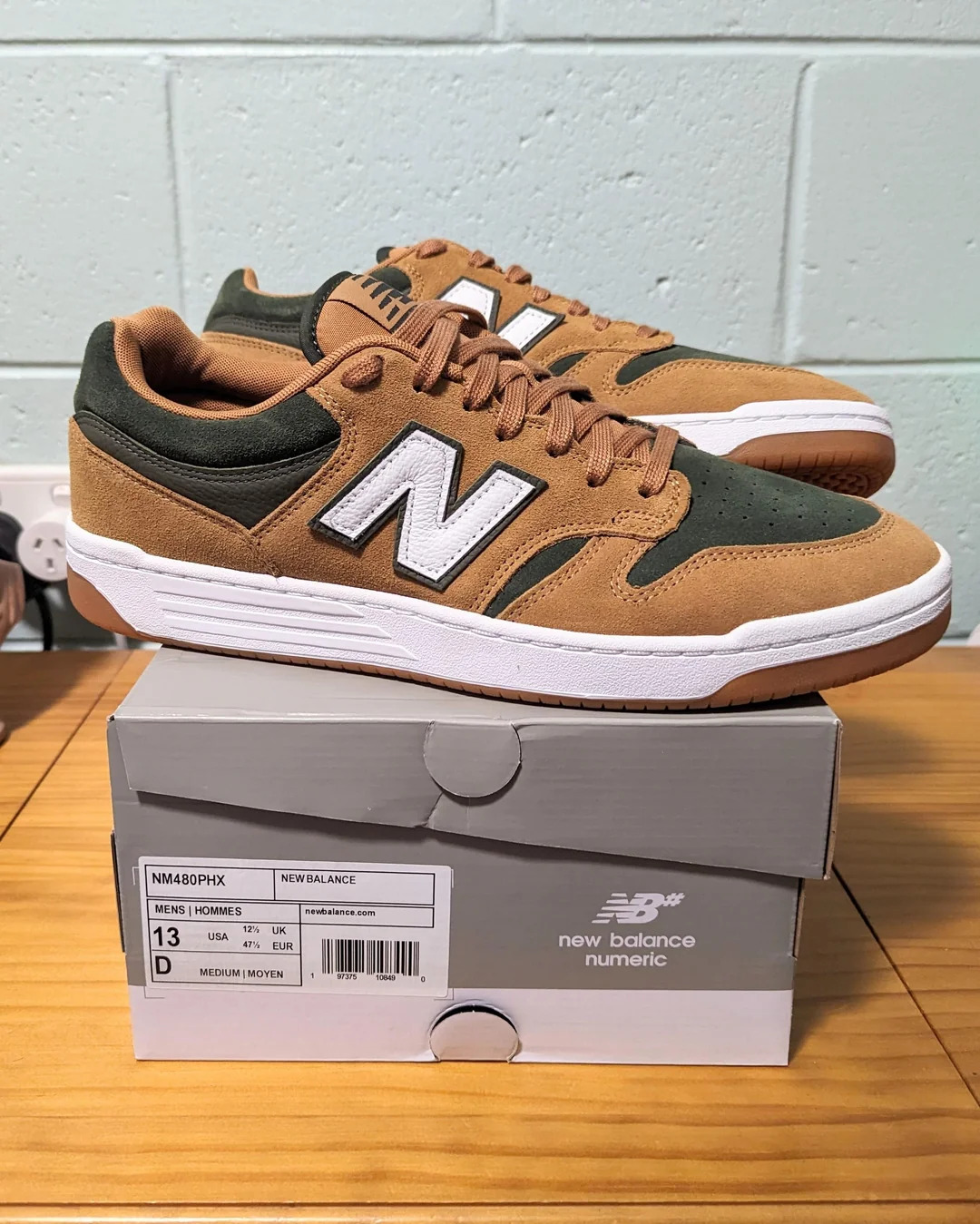
The New Balance Numeric 480 in a brown and dark green colorway.

The Numeric 480 is a skateboard variant of the shoe released in 2023. It features a thicker sole and more padding in the tongue. It comes in both low tops and high tops.

=== 480 SL ===
A version of the 480 made for golf. The 480 SL comes with a microfiber leather upper, a reinforced PU sockliner, and a flexible spineless cupsole for better use on grass. The shoe was released near the end of February 2024.

== In popular culture ==
The Jumpman logo for the Air Jordan brand was actually based on a photo Michael Jordan had done for the Life Magazine. In the picture, Michael Jordan could be seen wearing the New Balance 480 shoes while in the air.
