= Nicole Lynn =

American sports agent (born 1988)

- Born: December 13, 1988 (age 37)
- Education: University of Oklahoma
- Occupation: Sports agent

Nicole Lynn (born December 13, 1988) is an American sports agent. She is the first black woman to represent an NFL draft pick. She serves as the President of Football for Klutch Sports Group.

== Education and career ==
Lynn graduated from the University of Oklahoma College of Law in 2015. While studying law, she interned at the National Football League Players Association. In 2015, she joined PlayersRep as the agency's first female sports agent.

Lynn became the first black woman to represent an NFL draft pick in 2019, when she represented defensive tackle Quinnen Williams. That year, she was featured in Glamour's "Women of the Year" series. She went on to represent quarterback Jalen Hurts in 2020.

She received her certification to represent NBA players in 2020.

In 2021, she published Agent You, an autobiography. In 2020, it was reported that 50 Cent was producing a drama television series based on her life and career for Starz. Lynn will be an executive producer for the show.

In 2021, Lynn was included on Worth's "21 Most Powerful Women in the Business of Sports." That same year, Klutch Sports hired her as President of Football.
