= Mark Termini =

American sports agent

Mark Termini is a Cleveland, Ohio-based sports attorney and agent. His agency, Mark Termini Associates Inc., represents professional basketball players. He negotiated $1.4 billion in NBA contracts for the clients of the Klutch Sports Group from 2014 to 2019.

== Background and education ==
Termini graduated from Holy Name High School (1974) and Case Western Reserve University (1978). Both schools are located in Cleveland, Ohio. He then earned a J.D. degree cum laude from Cleveland State University Cleveland-Marshall College of Law in 1984.

== Sports business career ==
Termini founded the sports agency Mark Termini Associates Inc in 1986. His first three clients were Scott Roth, Brad Sellers, and Ron Harper, who all had Ohio basketball roots and then played in the NBA. The agency continued to grow by representing numerous professional players from Ohio.

After the Dallas Mavericks selected his client Jim Jackson with the fourth choice of the 1992 NBA draft, Jackson held out for the first 54 games of the 1992–93 season. Termini then negotiated his six-year, $20 million contract, including a full salary for the 1992–93 season, even though Jackson played only 28 games. At the time, it marked the most lucrative contract ever for a rookie guard. After Jackson retired, he started a long, successful broadcasting career based on a recommendation by Termini.

Under Termini's guidance, Kevin Edwards signed a five-year, $9.6 million free agent contract with the New Jersey Nets following the 1992–93 season. Termini's client Ron Harper, then with the Los Angeles Clippers, tied Michael Jordan for the fourth-highest NBA salary at $4 million in the 1993–94 season. Following that season, Harper signed a five-year $19.2 million deal with the Chicago Bulls. He played on three championship teams with the Bulls and two with the Los Angeles Lakers.

In August 1993, The Dallas Morning News included Termini in a group of the five most influential and high-profile NBA agents.

Termini represented Pau Gasol, a four-time NBA All-Star when he played for the Memphis Grizzlies. Gasol left his agency in 2004 after Termini refused to reduce his contract negotiation fee. Other former clients include Gary Trent, Calvin Booth, and Earl Boykins.

In 2006, Termini helped his client Damon Jones become the first NBA player to sign an endorsement contract with Chinese shoe manufacturer Li Ning.

Crain's Cleveland Business inducted Termini into its first 40 Under 40 class in 1991. The 40 Under 40 class was recognized again in 2011, when Termini was 55 years old.

Termini has negotiated over $2 billion in professional sports contracts. He has represented more than 30 selections in the NBA Draft, including former Ohio State star Kosta Koufos, who has been a Termini client for his entire career. Koufos played for CSKA Moscow, which competes in the Euroleague, the top professional basketball league in Europe. The two-year, $6 million contract he signed in July 2019 made him the highest paid American player in Europe. Termini's agency also represents players in foreign professional leagues.

In January 2013, Termini began working with agent Rich Paul of Klutch Sports Group. KSG represents NBA stars LeBron James, Anthony Davis, Draymond Green, John Wall, and Ben Simmons. Their client list also features players like Darius Garland, Malik Beasley, Montrezl Harrell, Miles Bridges, and Darius Bazley. As part of their working relationship, Termini ran the contract negotiations for Klutch Sports Group and all of its NBA clients. Paul sought the help of Termini for contract negotiations, his experience, and connections with NBA executives. Klutch already represented James when Termini joined the agency, but they soon began landing other elite NBA clients.

Termini was quoted regarding the pending sale of Cleveland-based agency IMG Worldwide in 2013.

Termini, who specialized in contract negotiation and construction, was a key figure in the free agency process that ultimately led to the return of LeBron James to the Cleveland Cavaliers in 2014. He developed a contract negotiation strategy prior to the 2014 NBA free agency signing period that led to James signing a two-year max contract with the Cleveland Cavaliers. Termini met with James, Paul, Maverick Carter (who handles James' marketing), and Cavaliers Owner Dan Gilbert on July 6, 2014, to discuss a contract. Six days later, James announced he would return to Cleveland. The two-year deal gave James more flexibility and the potential for greater earnings. Robert Lanza, former NBA Players Association General Counsel, called Termini "one of the finest contract attorneys in the country" following the contract. By signing a shorter deal than the four year maximum contract, James was able to take advantage of the rising NBA salary cap two years later. This unprecedented "one plus one" strategy resulted in James receiving $19 million more over the course of his Cavs contract than he otherwise would have earned by signing a four-year max deal with Cleveland in 2014.

During the 2014 offseason, contract negotiations for Klutch Sports Group client Eric Bledsoe and the Phoenix Suns continued into September. A restricted free agent, Bledsoe finally signed a 5-year, $70 million deal on September 24.

Termini advised the new National Basketball Players Association leaders to formally warn the NBA about their teams using preemptive media comments to chill offers for restricted free agents. This resulted in the NBA sending a memo to its teams warning of potential exposure if they used this long-unchallenged tactic, and added a new clause in the 2017 NBA Collective Bargaining Agreement to enforce the new rule.

Just prior to the 2015–16 season, Termini negotiated a five-year, $82 million contract for restricted free agent Tristan Thompson. That deal made Thompson the sixth-highest-paid power forward in the NBA for the 2015–16 season In 2015, Termini also negotiated a four-year, $33 million free agent contract for his client Kosta Koufos with the Sacramento Kings, along with deals for several other Klutch clients including Cory Joseph (four years, $30 million with the Toronto Raptors). Four years later, in 2019, Joseph signed with the Sacramento Kings for three years, $37 million.

Termini represented his long-time friend Flip Saunders, who coached 17 seasons in the NBA and won 654 career games. Saunders died in 2015 at age 60 of Hodgkin's lymphoma. Cuyahoga Heights High School, where Saunders starred as a player, named its new gym "Flip Saunders Gymnasium". Termini attended the January 2020 dedication ceremony. In 2023, Termini organized the Flip Saunders Park Dedication Ceremony.

Termini and Rich Paul collaborated on an endorsement contract that their client, Ben Simmons, signed with Nike on June 6, 2016. Simmons' five-year, guaranteed $20 million contract with Nike includes performance bonuses that could increase the value above $40 million. On June 23, 2016, Simmons became the first overall selection in the 2016 NBA Draft by the Philadelphia 76ers. After his third NBA season, Simmons signed a five-year max contract extension with the 76ers for $170 million in July 2019.

During the 2016 offseason, Termini negotiated a three-year, $100 million contract for LeBron James to stay with the Cleveland Cavaliers, which made him the highest paid player in the NBA for the first time in his career. Termini also finalized a four-year, $57 million deal for Klutch Sports Group client J.R. Smith just before the start of the 2016–17 season.

LeBron James opted out of his contract with the Cavaliers after the 2017–18 season. In July 2018, Klutch Sports announced that James signed a four-year, $153 million contract with the Los Angeles Lakers. Anthony Davis, one of the NBA's elite big men, signed with Klutch in September 2018. In June 2019, Davis was traded from the New Orleans Pelicans to the Lakers, joining James to form a powerful combination.

In February 2019, Klutch added another elite star in Golden State Warriors forward Draymond Green to its client roster. Green could have been a free agent after the 2019–20 season, but after discussing his future options in the marketplace with Termini and Paul, he signed a $100 million contract extension in August 2019.

In July 2019, United Talent Agency reached a deal with Klutch Sports Group to create a sports division led by Paul. United Talent Agency is one of Hollywood's top talent representation firms. Inc.com noted Termini's contract expertise in a September 2019 article on Paul.

Dejounte Murray, a San Antonio Spurs point guard represented by Klutch, signed a four-year, $64 million extension in October 2019. Murray landed the deal despite missing the entire 2018–19 season with a torn ACL. Following the acclaimed ESPN broadcast of "The Last Dance" regarding the 1997-98 Chicago Bulls season, Sports Illustrated characterized the trade of Termini client Ron Harper as the demise of the Cavaliers during the Michael Jordan era. Harper noted his first contract negotiation with Cavaliers GM Wayne Embry may have played a role in his trade to the Los Angeles Clippers on November 15, 1989. Embry later wrote in his 2004 book that maybe he should have talked to agent Mark Termini.

During the 2020 NBA Coronavirus shutdown, the media highlighted Termini's negotiation and structuring of numerous Klutch client contracts to receive over 90 percent of their 2019–20 season salary due by April 1, 2020. Most NBA players receive their salaries over 12 months, but many Klutch clients secured much more favorable payment terms on their contracts, including non-star players such as Darius Bazley, Trey Lyles, Miles Bridges, Darius Garland and Dejounte Murray. When Termini's agreement with Klutch expired in 2020, RealGM noted some of the ground-breaking contracts Termini designed and negotiated during his tenure as the NBA negotiator for the Klutch Sports Group. In addition to contracts for LeBron James, they included deals for Eric Bledsoe, Tristan Thompson, and Ben Simmons.

In September 2021, it was noted that Termini had been contacted as a potential candidate for the executive director position of the National Basketball Players Association (NBPA).

In 2021, Termini generated and sponsored a ceremonial game for the Men's Varsity basketball team at his alma mater. The Covid pandemic cancelled the 2020-21 Case Western Reserve University season, and Termini wanted to provide a symbolic opportunity for the Division III program players and their parents. He also used the coverage of the game as an opportunity to comment on the inequities levied against Division III basketball programs by the NCAA.

When Ben Simmons held out at the start of the 2021–22 season, Termini was credited with influencing the use by Klutch Sports of the holdout tactic even though he had left the firm two years prior.

Termini is often quoted in the media on issues related to sports economics and sports law. In 2011, Termini recognized the negative impact of the new NBA Collective Bargaining Agreement on the power of agents. More recently, he stated his opposition to the buyout maneuver used by NBA teams to land players for a discounted contract. Termini has written on these topics as well.

Termini's use of the hardball negotiation tactics that became Klutch's calling card (during the Termini years), and his "legendary iron will" were explained in 2021. Although Termini ended his association with Klutch in 2020, an analysis of the Ben Simmons-Philadelphia 76ers holdout during the 2021–22 season referred to Termini as "The Holdout Master".

Termini's design and implementation of the LeBron James “one plus one” strategy is continuously referenced due to its precedent-setting effect in the NBA. When media discussion began for the possible return of LeBron James to the Cavs in 2024, it was recognized again.

== Athletic career ==
A basketball standout in high school and college, Termini scored 1,161 career points when he played for Case Western Reserve University from 1974 through 1978. He averaged 21.7 points per game his senior season. He also set records for career free throw percentage (85.4) and most assists in one season (106). Termini is a member of the Hall of Fame as a player at both Case Western Reserve University and Holy Name High School.

== Personal ==
A lifelong Clevelander, Termini and his wife Wendy currently reside in the Greater Cleveland area. Wendy Cohn (Termini) is an attorney and partner in MTA. A fellow graduate of Cleveland Marshall Law School (1988), she provides negotiation and legal expertise to the clients of MTA. Termini's father Marlo was a long-time Cleveland area basketball coach. He is a member of the Greater Cleveland Sports Hall of Fame and the National Senior Softball Hall of Fame. His father died in 2018 at age 92. Case Western Reserve University formally announced the dedication of the Mark Termini Men's Basketball Locker Room on Friday, February 10, 2023.
