= New Balance 550 =

Line of shoes by New Balance

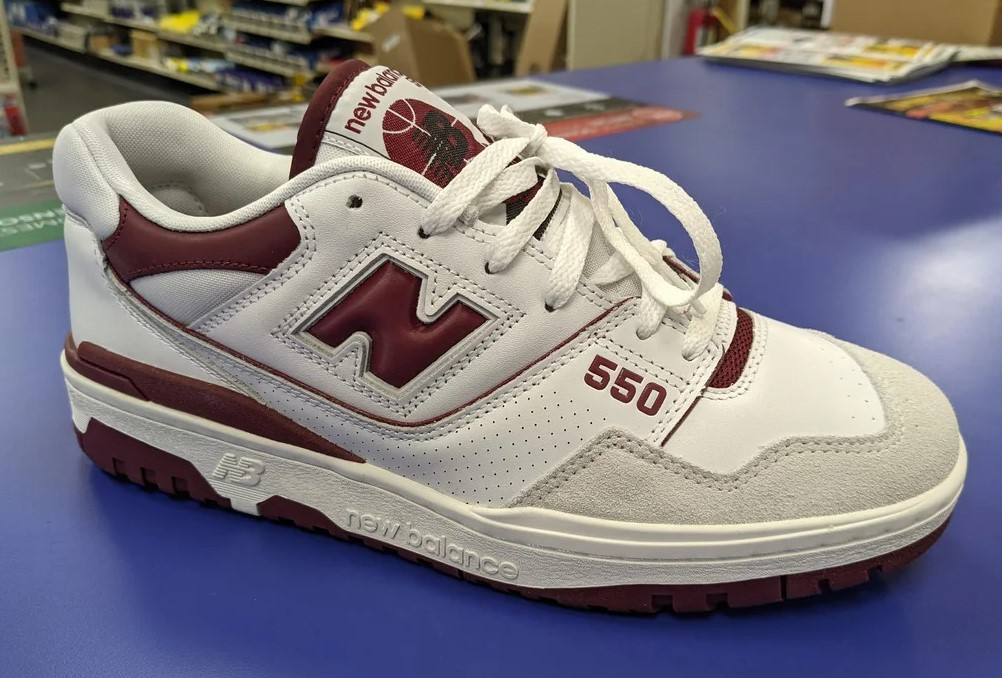
- Type: Sneakers
- Inventor: New Balance
- Inception: 1989; 37 years ago
- Manufacturer: New Balance
- Available: Yes

New Balance 550 is a basketball shoe produced by New Balance.

== Overview ==
The shoes were designed by Steven Smith and created as a low top version of the company's New Balance Pride 650. The shoe was originally known as the New Balance P550 Oxford and was primarily a budget shoe. It sold for $45 when it was first released in 1989. The shoe was designed to improve on the New Balance 480. Smooth leather was used for the upper, and perforated profile panels and lightweight mesh for the base to make it more breathable, a major complaint with the 480. The heel had a molded structure to improve stability and lockdown, and the sole used an updated traction pattern and layout to provide better responsiveness. The shoe also featured a very thick sole with EVA foam.

The shoe was brought back in 2020 when Aimé Leon Dore decided to collaborate with the company. The shoe was not successful when it first launched decades ago and was so obscure for the company itself that it had to buy used pairs and find old sketches to recreate the release as close to the original. The release proved to be so successful that it led to the shoe becoming a general release for the company.

== Models ==
=== 550 SL ===
A golf variant of the shoe released in April 2024. The shoe features a waterproof microfiber leather upper, the company's NDurance spikeless rubber outsole, and a golf ball on the tongue instead of a basketball.
