= 2012 NCAA Division I men's basketball championship game =

American college basketball final

2012 NCAA Tournament Championship Game
National championship game
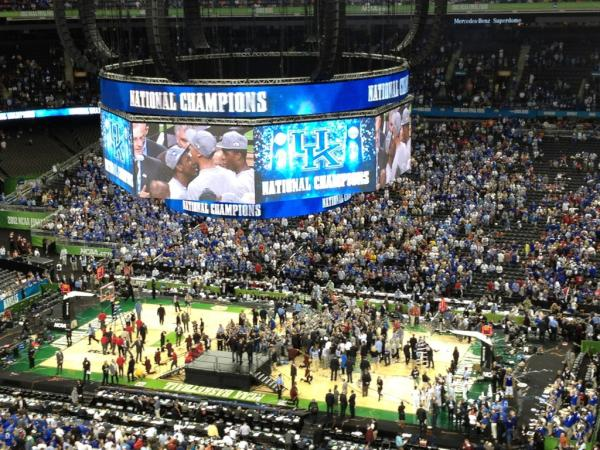
- The Mercedes-Benz Superdome after the championship game.
Kansas Jayhawks	Kentucky Wildcats
Big 12	SEC
(32–6)	(37–2)
59	67
Head coach: Bill Self	Head coach: John Calipari
- AP: 6
- Coaches: 6
- AP: 1
- Coaches: 1
	1st half	2nd half	Total
Kansas Jayhawks	27	32	59
Kentucky Wildcats	41	26	67
- Date: April 2, 2012
- Venue: Mercedes-Benz Superdome, New Orleans, Louisiana
- MVP: Anthony Davis, Kentucky
- Favorite: Kentucky by 7
- Referees: Verne Harris, Mark Whitehead, Mike Stuart
- Attendance: 70,913
- National anthem: The Fray

United States TV coverage
- Network: CBS
- Announcers: Jim Nantz (play-by-play); Clark Kellogg and Steve Kerr (color); Tracy Wolfson (sideline)
- Nielsen Ratings: 12.3

The 2012 NCAA Division I men's basketball championship game was the finals of the 2012 NCAA Division I men's basketball tournament and it determined the national champion for the 2011–12 NCAA Division I men's basketball season. The game was played on April 2, 2012, at the Mercedes-Benz Superdome in New Orleans, Louisiana, and featured the South Regional Champion, #1-seeded Kentucky and the Midwest Regional Champion, #2-seeded Kansas. The two head coaches for this game, Kentucky's John Calipari and Kansas's Bill Self also coached at the 2008 National Championship Game where Bill Self was coaching for Kansas and John Calipari was coaching for Memphis. This was a rematch of a regular season encounter at the 2011 Champions Classic, which Kentucky had won 75–65.

This was the last time that an SEC team won a men's basketball national championship until 2025, when Florida defeated Houston, 65–63.

== Participants ==
=== Kansas Jayhawks ===
Kansas entered the tournament as the #2 seed in the Midwest Regional. In the 2nd Round, Thomas Robinson had a double-double with 16 points and 13 rebounds as Kansas beat Detroit 65–50. In the 3rd round against Purdue trailing 60–59, Elijah Johnson got the steal and layup to take a 61–60 lead and with 3 seconds left, Tyshawn Taylor made a dunk for a 63–60 win. In the Sweet 16 against NC State, Jeff Withey blocked 10 shots to survive with a 60–57 victory. In the Elite Eight, Tyshawn Taylor finally got hot with 22 points, 6 rebounds, 5 assists, and 5 steals as Kansas beat North Carolina 80–67 to advance to the Final Four. In the Final Four, Ohio State got off to a strong start and had a 26–13 lead at one point and then, Kansas managed to control Jared Sullinger to beat the Buckeyes 64–62 and advance to the 2012 National Championship Game.

=== Kentucky Wildcats ===
Kentucky entered the tournament as the #1 overall seed and was placed in the South Regional. The Wildcats dominated Western Kentucky in an 81–66 victory. In the 3rd round, after being up 38–27 at halftime, Kentucky pulled away from Iowa State to advance to the Sweet 16. In the Sweet 16, Michael Kidd-Gilchrist scored 24 points to take revenge on Indiana with a 102–90 win. Indiana beat Kentucky on December 10, 2011, at Assembly Hall on a Christian Watford buzzer-beater. The Wildcats managed to beat Baylor in the Elite Eight with an 82–70 win to earn a spot in the Final Four. In the National Semifinal, Anthony Davis had a double-double with 18 points and 14 rebounds to lead Kentucky to the 2012 National Championship Game with a 69–61 win over Louisville.

== Starting lineups ==
Kansas	Position		Kentucky
Tyshawn Taylor	G		Marquis Teague
Elijah Johnson	G		Doron Lamb
Travis Releford	G	F	Michael Kidd-Gilchrist
† Thomas Robinson	F		Terrence Jones
Jeff Withey	C		† Anthony Davis
† 2012 Consensus First Team All-American

== Game summary ==
CBS

April 2, 2012
9:23 pm

Recap, Box score

#MW2 Kansas Jayhawks 59, #S1 Kentucky Wildcats 67
Scoring by half: 27–41, 32–26
Pts: Tyshawn Taylor 19; Rebs: Thomas Robinson 17; Asts: Tyshawn Taylor 3	Pts: Doron Lamb 22; Rebs: Anthony Davis 16; Asts: Anthony Davis 5

Mercedes-Benz Superdome, New Orleans, Louisiana
Attendance: 70,913

=== 1st Half ===
Despite no points from Naismith Trophy winner Anthony Davis in the 1st 9 and a quarter minutes, Kentucky got off to a hot start with Michael Kidd-Gilchrist scoring 7 of his 11 points, Doron Lamb 6 points, and Marquis Teague and Terrence Jones each 4 points in that same time frame as Kentucky would have a 23–14 lead and Kansas would be forced to call timeout. The Wildcats kept their dominance to lead 41–27 at halftime despite no points from Davis, as Kidd-Gilchrist scored all 11 of his points in the 1st half, Lamb had 12 points, and Teague had nine. For the Jayhawks, Thomas Robinson and Tyshawn Taylor each scored eight points, and Jeff Withey scored 5.

=== 2nd Half ===
Anthony Davis's 1st point of the night came with a made free throw with 15:30 left to give Kentucky a 44–30 lead. Elijah Johnson scored four points in 15 seconds to cut the Kentucky lead to 46–34 and force a timeout. But, with Kentucky up 48–38, Doron Lamb made two three-pointers on 40 seconds for a 54–38 lead. Davis's 1st field goal of the night came with a made jump shot with 5:14 left to give Kentucky a 59–44 lead. Then, Tyshawn Taylor scored six points in one minute, and Thomas Robinson made a pair of free throws to cut the lead to 59–52. Kansas kept its comeback effort going with an Elijah Johnson three-pointer and Robinson making a pair of free throws, cutting their deficit to 62–57. Kentucky was able to hold on when Davis made a free throw, and Marquis Teague and Lamb each made a pair of free throws for a 67–59 victory.
