= 2012 NCAA Men's Basketball All-Americans =

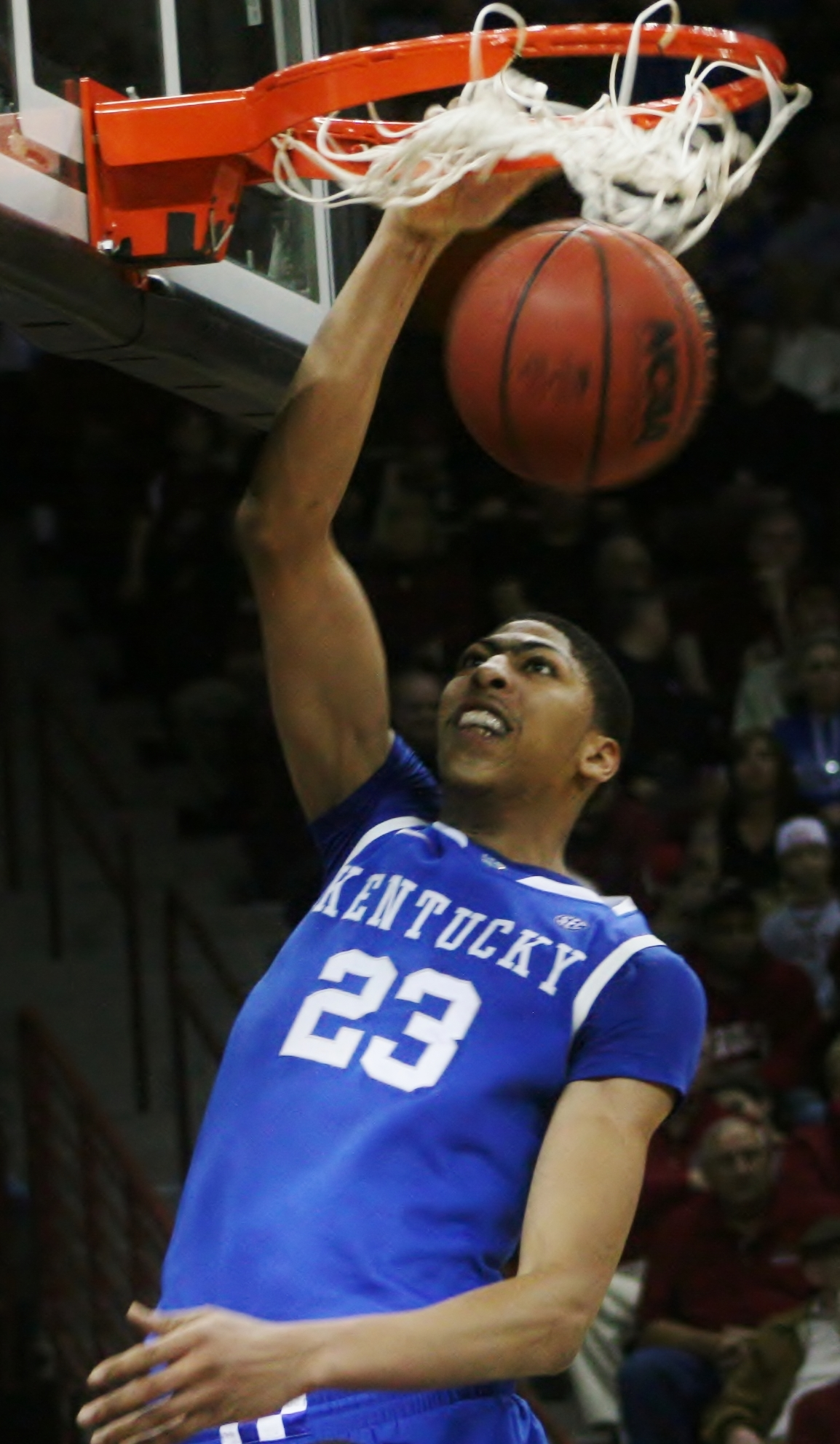
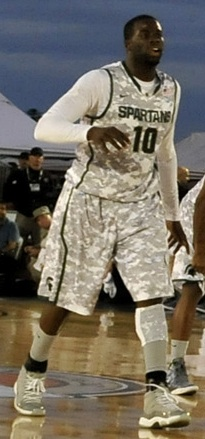
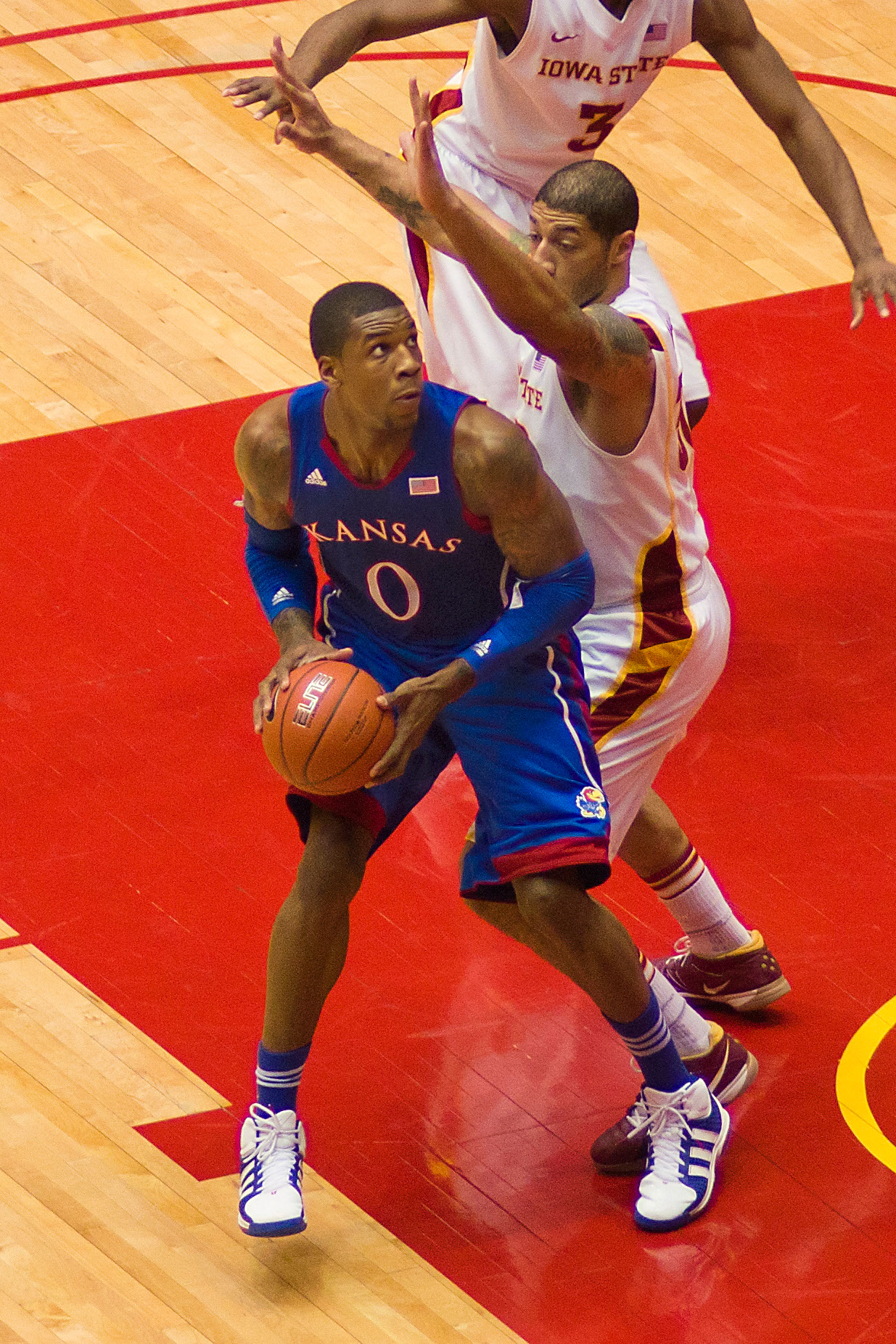
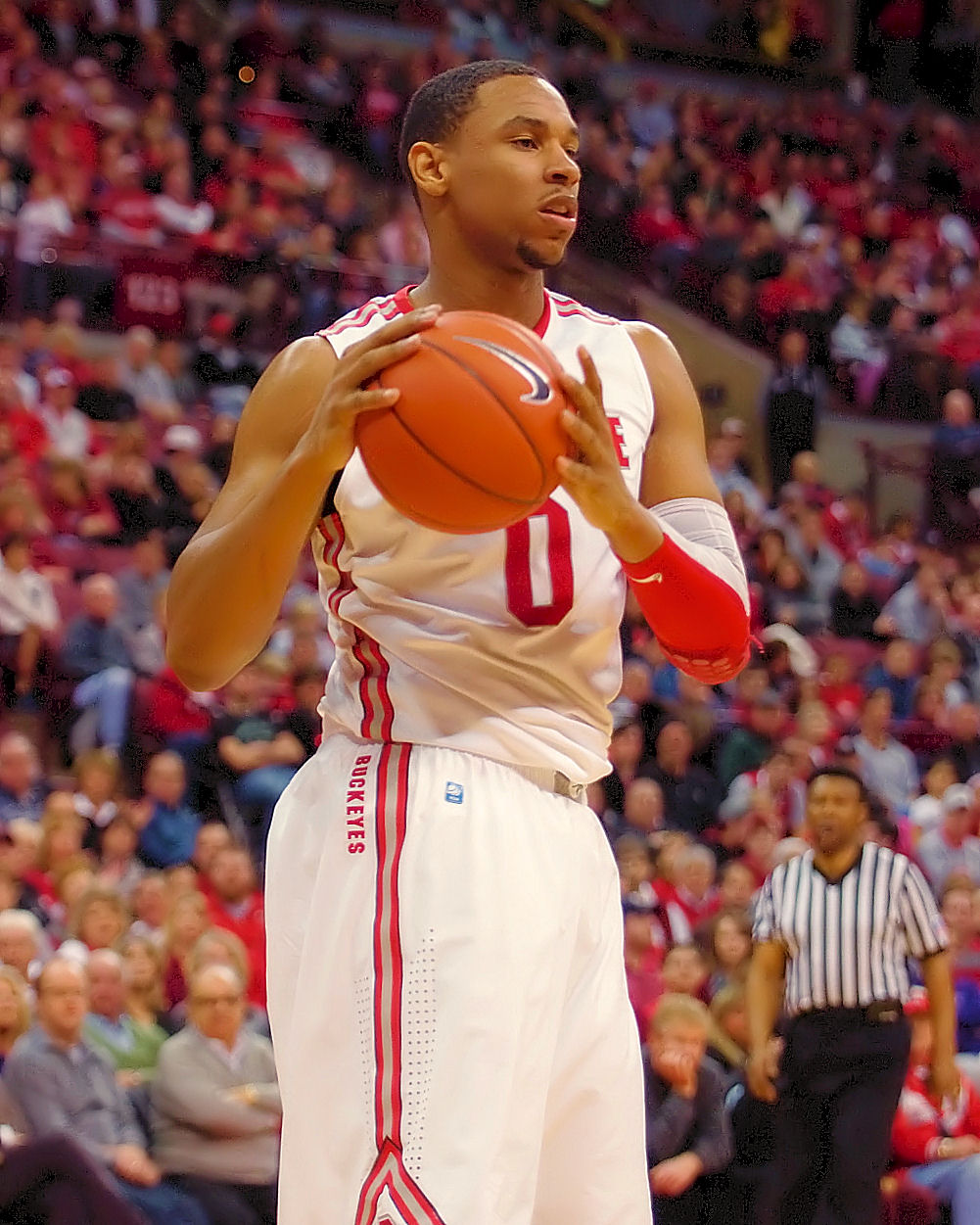
- Members of the 2012 Consensus All-America first team. Clockwise from upper left: Davis, Green, Sullinger and Robinson (not pictured: McDermott).
- Awarded for: 2011–12 NCAA Division I men's basketball season

An All-American team is an honorary sports team composed of the best amateur players of a specific season for each team position—who in turn are given the honorific "All-America" and typically referred to as "All-American athletes", or simply "All-Americans". Although the honorees generally do not compete together as a unit, the term is used in U.S. team sports to refer to players who are selected by members of the national media. Walter Camp selected the first All-America team in the early days of American football in 1889. The 2012 NCAA Men's Basketball All-Americans are honorary lists that include All-American selections from the Associated Press (AP), the United States Basketball Writers Association (USBWA), the Sporting News (TSN), and the National Association of Basketball Coaches (NABC) for the 2011–12 NCAA Division I men's basketball season. All selectors choose at least a first and second 5-man team. The NABC, TSN and AP choose third teams, while AP also lists honorable mention selections.

The Consensus 2012 College Basketball All-American team is determined by aggregating the results of the four major All-American teams as determined by the National Collegiate Athletic Association (NCAA). Since United Press International was replaced by TSN in 1997, the four major selectors have been the aforementioned ones. AP has been a selector since 1948, NABC since 1957 and USBWA since 1960. To earn "consensus" status, a player must win honors based on a point system computed from the four different all-America teams. The point system consists of three points for first team, two points for second team and one point for third team. No honorable mention or fourth team or lower are used in the computation. The top five totals plus ties are first team and the next five plus ties are second team.

Although the aforementioned lists are used to determine consensus honors, there are numerous other All-American lists. The ten finalists for the John Wooden Award are described as Wooden All-Americans. The ten finalists for the Lowe's Senior CLASS Award are described as Senior All-Americans. Other All-American lists include those determined by Fox Sports, and Yahoo! Sports. The scholar-athletes selected by College Sports Information Directors of America (CoSIDA) are termed Academic All-Americans.

== 2012 Consensus All-America team ==
The following players are recognized as the 2012 Consensus All-Americans:

PG – Point guard
SG – Shooting guard
PF – Power forward
SF – Small forward
C – Center

Consensus First Team
Player	Position	Class	Team
Anthony Davis	C	Freshman	Kentucky
Draymond Green	F	Senior	Michigan State
Doug McDermott	F	Sophomore	Creighton
Thomas Robinson	F	Junior	Kansas
Jared Sullinger	F	Sophomore	Ohio State

Consensus Second Team
Player	Position	Class	Team
Isaiah Canaan	G	Junior	Murray State
Marcus Denmon	G	Senior	Missouri
Kevin Jones	F	Senior	West Virginia
Michael Kidd-Gilchrist	F	Freshman	Kentucky
Tyler Zeller	C	Senior	North Carolina

== Individual All-America teams ==
=== By player ===
Player	School	AP	USBWA	NABC	TSN	CP	Notes
Anthony Davis	Kentucky	1	1	1	1	12	National Player of the Year (Associated Press, Naismith, Robertson, Rupp, Sporting News, Wooden), Defensive Player of the Year (Driesell & NABC), Freshman of the Year (USBWA), NCAA Tournament Most Outstanding Player, Pete Newell Big Man Award
Draymond Green	Michigan State	1	1	1	1	12	National Player of the Year (NABC)
Thomas Robinson	Kansas	1	1	1	1	12	National Player of the Year (ESPN.com)
Jared Sullinger	Ohio State	1	1	1	1	12	
Doug McDermott	Creighton	1	1	1	2	11	Lute Olson Award
Isaiah Canaan	Murray State	2	2	3	1	8	
Marcus Denmon	Missouri	2	2	2	2	8	
Tyler Zeller	North Carolina	2	2	2	2	8	Academic All-American of the Year
Kevin Jones	West Virginia	2	2	2	3	7	
Michael Kidd-Gilchrist	Kentucky	3	2	3	2	6	
Jae Crowder	Marquette	2		3	2	5	
Harrison Barnes	North Carolina			2	3	3	
John Jenkins	Vanderbilt	3			3	2	
Kris Joseph	Syracuse			2		2	
Damian Lillard	Weber State	3		3		2	
Tyshawn Taylor	Kansas	3			3	2	
Kendall Marshall	North Carolina	3				1	Bob Cousy Award
Austin Rivers	Duke			3		1	
Mike Scott	Virginia				3	1	

=== By team ===
All-America Team
All-America Team	First team		Second team		Third team	
All-America Team	Player	School	Player	School	Player	School
Associated Press	Anthony Davis	Kentucky	Isaiah Canaan	Murray State	John Jenkins	Vanderbilt
Associated Press	Draymond Green	Michigan State	Jae Crowder	Marquette	Michael Kidd-Gilchrist	Kentucky
Associated Press	Doug McDermott	Creighton	Marcus Denmon	Missouri	Damian Lillard	Weber State
Associated Press	Thomas Robinson	Kansas	Kevin Jones	West Virginia	Kendall Marshall	North Carolina
Associated Press	Jared Sullinger	Ohio State	Tyler Zeller	North Carolina	Tyshawn Taylor	Kansas
USBWA	Anthony Davis	Kentucky	Isaiah Canaan	Murray State	No third team	
USBWA	Draymond Green	Michigan State	Marcus Denmon	Missouri	No third team	
USBWA	Doug McDermott	Creighton	Kevin Jones	West Virginia	No third team	
USBWA	Thomas Robinson	Kansas	Michael Kidd-Gilchrist	Kentucky	No third team	
USBWA	Jared Sullinger	Ohio State	Tyler Zeller	North Carolina	No third team	
NABC	Anthony Davis	Kentucky	Harrison Barnes	North Carolina	Isaiah Canaan	Murray State
NABC	Draymond Green	Michigan State	Marcus Denmon	Missouri	Jae Crowder	Marquette
NABC	Doug McDermott	Creighton	Kevin Jones	West Virginia	Michael Kidd-Gilchrist	Kentucky
NABC	Thomas Robinson	Kansas	Kris Joseph	Syracuse	Damian Lillard	Weber State
NABC	Jared Sullinger	Ohio State	Tyler Zeller	North Carolina	Austin Rivers	Duke
Sporting News	Isaiah Canaan	Murray State	Jae Crowder	Marquette	Harrison Barnes	North Carolina
Sporting News	Anthony Davis	Kentucky	Marcus Denmon	Missouri	John Jenkins	Vanderbilt
Sporting News	Draymond Green	Michigan State	Michael Kidd-Gilchrist	Kentucky	Kevin Jones	West Virginia
Sporting News	Thomas Robinson	Kansas	Doug McDermott	Creighton	Mike Scott	Virginia
Sporting News	Jared Sullinger	Ohio State	Tyler Zeller	North Carolina	Tyshawn Taylor	Kansas

AP Honorable Mention:

- Harrison Barnes, North Carolina
- Will Barton, Memphis
- Julian Boyd, LIU Brooklyn
- Ryan Broekhoff, Valparaiso
- De'Mon Brooks, Davidson
- Trey Burke, Michigan
- Deonte Burton, Nevada
- Torrey Craig, S.C.-Upstate
- Paul Crosby, Mississippi Valley State
- Matthew Dellavedova, Saint Mary's
- LaRon Dendy, Middle Tennessee
- Matt Dickey, UNC Asheville
- Jamaal Franklin, San Diego State
- Jorge Gutierrez, California
- John Henson, North Carolina
- Robbie Hummel, Purdue
- Pierre Jackson, Baylor
- Darius Johnson-Odom, Marquette
- Perry Jones III, Baylor
- Kris Joseph, Syracuse
- Jeremy Lamb, Connecticut
- Scott Machado, Iona
- CJ McCollum, Lehigh
- Dominique Morrison, Oral Roberts
- Mike Moser, UNLV
- Andrew Nicholson, St. Bonaventure
- Kyle O'Quinn, Norfolk State
- Darryl Partin, Boston University
- Ryan Pearson, George Mason
- Mason Plumlee, Duke
- Patrick Richard, McNeese State
- Austin Rivers, Duke
- Zack Rosen, Pennsylvania
- Mike Scott, Virginia
- John Shurna, Northwestern
- Jordan Taylor, Wisconsin
- Dion Waiters, Syracuse
- Casper Ware, Long Beach State
- Mitchell Watt, Buffalo
- Royce White, Iowa State
- Isaiah Wilkerson, NJIT
- Nate Wolters, South Dakota State
- Cody Zeller, Indiana

== Academic All-Americans ==
On February 23, 2012, CoSIDA and Capital One announced the 2012 Academic All-America team, with Tyler Zeller headlining the University Division as the men's college basketball Academic All-American of the Year. The following is the 2011–12 Capital One Academic All-America Men's Basketball Team (University Division) as selected by CoSIDA:

First Team
Player	School	Class	GPA and major
Aaron Craft	Ohio State	Sophomore	3.89 Exercise Science/Pre-Med
Matthew Dellavedova	Saint Mary's	Junior	3.61 Psychology
Brad Loesing	Wofford	Senior	3.90 Business Administration
Mason Plumlee	Duke	Junior	3.44 Psychology/Cultural Anthropology
Tyler Zeller	North Carolina	Senior	3.62 Business Administration

Second Team
Player	School	Class	GPA and major
Logan Aronhalt	Albany	Junior	3.78 Human Biology
Brian Conklin	Saint Louis	Grad. Student	3.54 Business Administration
Drew Crawford	Northwestern	Junior	3.40 Economics
Ronald Nored	Butler	Senior	3.64 Early, Middle Childhood Education
Scott Saunders	Belmont	Senior	3.84 Finance & Marketing

Third Team
Player	School	Class	GPA and major
J. P. Kuhlman	Davidson	Junior	3.80 Religion
Zack Novak	Michigan	Senior	3.51 Business
Brian Stafford	Denver	Senior	3.70 Finance
Matthew Sullivan	Brown	Junior	4.00 Economics
Chris Wroblewski	Cornell	Senior	3.66 App. Economics & Management

== Senior All-Americans ==
The ten finalists for the Lowe's Senior CLASS Award are called Senior All-Americans. The 10 honorees are as follows:

Player	School
William Buford	Ohio State
Ashton Gibbs	Pitt
Draymond Green	Michigan State
Mick Hedgepeth	Belmont
Robbie Hummel	Purdue
Quinn McDowell	William & Mary
Ronald Nored	Butler
Zack Novak	Michigan
Zack Rosen	Penn
Tyler Zeller	North Carolina
