= Terrence Jones =

American basketball player (born 1992)

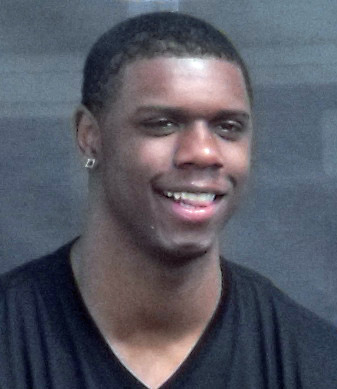
- Jones in 2012

Personal information
- Born: January 9, 1992 (age 34) Portland, Oregon, U.S.
- Listed height: 6 ft 9 in (2.06 m)
- Listed weight: 255 lb (116 kg)

Career information
- High school: Jefferson (Portland, Oregon)
- College: Kentucky (2010–2012)
- NBA draft: 2012: 1st round, 18th overall pick
- Drafted by: Houston Rockets
- Playing career: 2012–2023
- Position: Power forward

Career history
- 2012–2016: Houston Rockets
- 2012–2013: →Rio Grande Valley Vipers
- 2016–2017: New Orleans Pelicans
- 2017: Milwaukee Bucks
- 2017: Qingdao DoubleStar Eagles
- 2017–2018: Santa Cruz Warriors
- 2018–2019: Erie BayHawks
- 2019: Houston Rockets
- 2019: →Rio Grande Valley Vipers
- 2019: TNT KaTropa
- 2020: Mets de Guaynabo
- 2021: Grand Rapids Gold
- 2021–2022: Cariduros de Fajardo
- 2022: Kaohsiung Steelers
- 2023: Leones de Ponce
- 2023: Piratas de Quebradillas

Career highlights
- PBA Best Import of the Conference (2019 Commissioner's); NCAA champion (2012); SEC Rookie of the Year (2011); First-team All-SEC (2011); SEC All-Rookie Team (2011); McDonald's All-American (2010); First-team Parade All-American (2010)
- Stats at NBA.com
- Stats at Basketball Reference

Terrence Alexander Jones (born January 9, 1992) is an American former professional basketball player. He played college basketball for the Kentucky Wildcats.

== High school career ==
Jones was ranked the No. 8 player in the class of 2010 by Scout.com, the No. 9 player in the ESPNU 100, and the No. 13 player by Rivals.com. Jones led Jefferson High School to three straight Oregon class 5A state championships between his sophomore and senior years. As a junior in 2008–09, he averaged 32 points, 13 rebounds, five assists, three blocks and three steals per game. As a senior in 2009–10, he averaged 30 points, 14 rebounds and 6 assists per game.

On January 20, 2010, he was named in the Junior National Select Team to compete in the 2010 Nike Hoop Summit at the Rose Garden in Portland, Oregon, on April 10. He was also selected to play in the 2010 McDonald's All-American Game and the 2010 Jordan Brand Classic.

=== Recruiting ===
Jones committed to Washington on April 30, 2010, but did not sign a National Letter of Intent. He ended up changing his mind and on May 19, 2010, he signed a financial aid agreement with Kentucky instead of a letter of intent.

College recruiting
Name	Hometown	School	Height	Weight	Commit date
Terrence Jones; SF	Portland, OR	Jefferson High School	6 ft 9 in (2.06 m)	220 lb (100 kg)	May 19, 2010
Terrence Jones; SF	Recruit ratings: Scout: Rivals: (97)				
Overall recruit ranking: Rivals: 13 247Sports: 9 ESPN: 9
Note: In many cases, Scout, Rivals, 247Sports, On3, and ESPN may conflict in their listings of height and weight.; In these cases, the average was taken. ESPN grades are on a 100-point scale.; Sources: "Kentucky 2010 Basketball Commitments". Rivals.; "2010 Kentucky Wildcats Recruiting Class". ESPN.; "2010 Team Ranking". Rivals.

== College career ==
Jones had 25 points and 12 rebounds in his debut with Kentucky in a win vs. East Tennessee State. Jones and Doron Lamb became the first freshman duo in UK history to score 20 points in a debut.

On January 11, 2011, Jones came off the bench for the first time in 2010–11 after not being able to participate in that day's practice due to illness. That night, he broke the UK freshman single-game scoring record, putting up 35 points on 11-of-17 shooting against Auburn University. This came just one month after teammate Doron Lamb set the record with 32 points. The Wildcats advanced to the 2011 Final Four but ended up losing by one point to the University of Connecticut. Jones and Lamb decided to stay a second year at Kentucky instead of enter the NBA draft with freshmen Brandon Knight, Enes Kanter, junior DeAndre Liggins, and senior Josh Harrellson. As a freshman, he averaged 15.7 points, 8.8 rebounds, 1.6 assists, 1.1 steals and 1.9 blocks per game.

Entering his sophomore year, Jones was part of what was considered one of "the most highly anticipated" Kentucky basketball teams of all time based on pre-season hype, recruit expectations, and existing talent. On October 26, 2011, Jones participated in Kentucky's annual Blue vs. White scrimmage, scoring a school-record 52 points. In 2011–12, he averaged 12.3 points and 7.2 rebounds in 38 game (34 starts). In the NCAA tournament that season, Jones helped Kentucky win their eighth national championship.

In April 2012, Jones was one of six Wildcats to enter the NBA draft, along with Anthony Davis, Michael Kidd-Gilchrist, Marquis Teague, Doron Lamb, and Darius Miller. All six players were drafted, setting a record for most players from one school drafted in the NBA draft.

=== College statistics ===
Year	Team	GP	GS	MPG	FG%	3P%	FT%	RPG	APG	SPG	BPG	PPG
2010–11	Kentucky	38	35	31.5	.442	.329	.646	8.8	1.6	1.1	1.9	15.7
2011–12	Kentucky	38	34	29.3	.500	.327	.627	7.2	1.3	1.3	1.8	12.3

== Professional career ==
=== Houston Rockets (2012–2016) ===
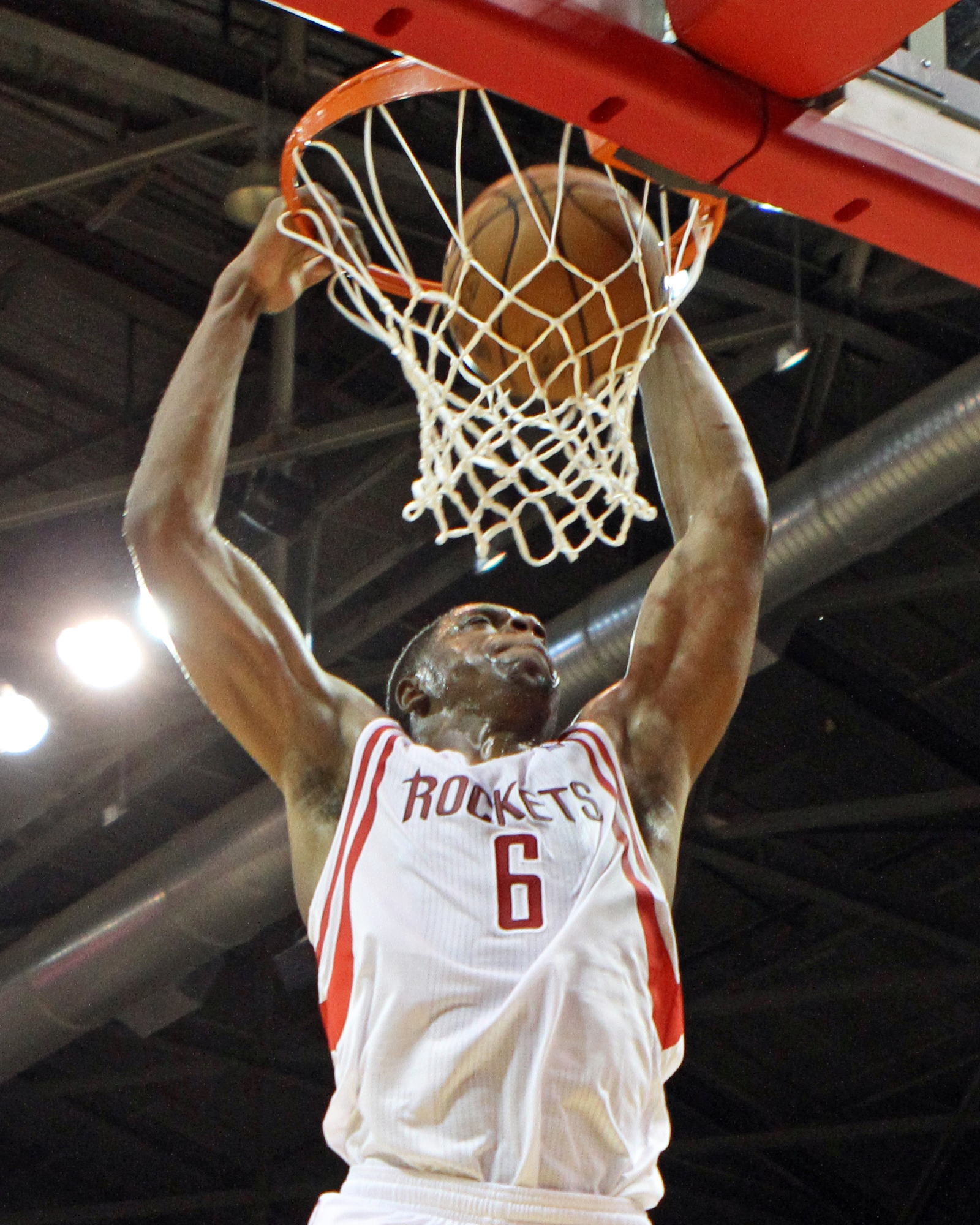
Jones with the Rockets in October 2012

Jones was selected by the Houston Rockets with the 18th overall pick in the 2012 NBA draft. During his rookie season, he had multiple assignments with the Rio Grande Valley Vipers of the NBA Development League. On February 4, 2013, Jones was named to the Prospects All-Star roster for the 2013 NBA D-League All-Star Game. However, he was replaced by Chris Wright because he was later recalled by the Rockets and thus was not an "active" player on a D-League roster.

On January 18, 2014, Jones scored a career-high 36 points, along with 11 rebounds and 2 blocks, in a 114–104 win over the Milwaukee Bucks. He became the second youngest Rocket to score 30 points or more behind Hakeem Olajuwon.

After playing the first four games of the 2014–15 season, Jones went on to miss the next 41 games due to nerve inflammation in his left leg. He returned to action on January 28, 2015, against the Dallas Mavericks. On February 27, 2015, he scored a season-high 26 points in a 102–98 win over the Brooklyn Nets. He later missed six games in late March with a partially collapsed lung.

Jones again had an injury plagued season in 2015–16, going out in the preseason with a concussion and during the season with a lacerated eyelid and stitches that scratched his eye. Then on February 3, 2016, Jones crashed into another vehicle on his way to the Rockets' flight to Phoenix, remained in the hospital for two days of tests, and was out for the remaining three games before the All-Star break. He returned to action on February 23, but lasted just four games before being deactivated indefinitely on March 2 due to a respiratory illness. On the court, Jones began the season as the starter at power forward with Donatas Motiejūnas out injured. But after 11 games, he was replaced in the starting lineup by Clint Capela.

=== New Orleans Pelicans (2016–2017) ===
On July 22, 2016, Jones signed with the New Orleans Pelicans. On November 16, 2016, he scored a then season-high 26 points while starting in place of the injured Anthony Davis in an 89–82 loss to the Orlando Magic. On January 23, 2017, he tied his career high with 36 points in a 124–122 win over the Cleveland Cavaliers. On February 23, 2017, he was waived by the Pelicans following the team's acquisition of DeMarcus Cousins.

=== Milwaukee Bucks (2017) ===
On March 4, 2017, Jones signed with the Milwaukee Bucks. He appeared in just three games for the Bucks before being waived by the team on April 1, 2017.

=== Qingdao Eagles (2017) ===
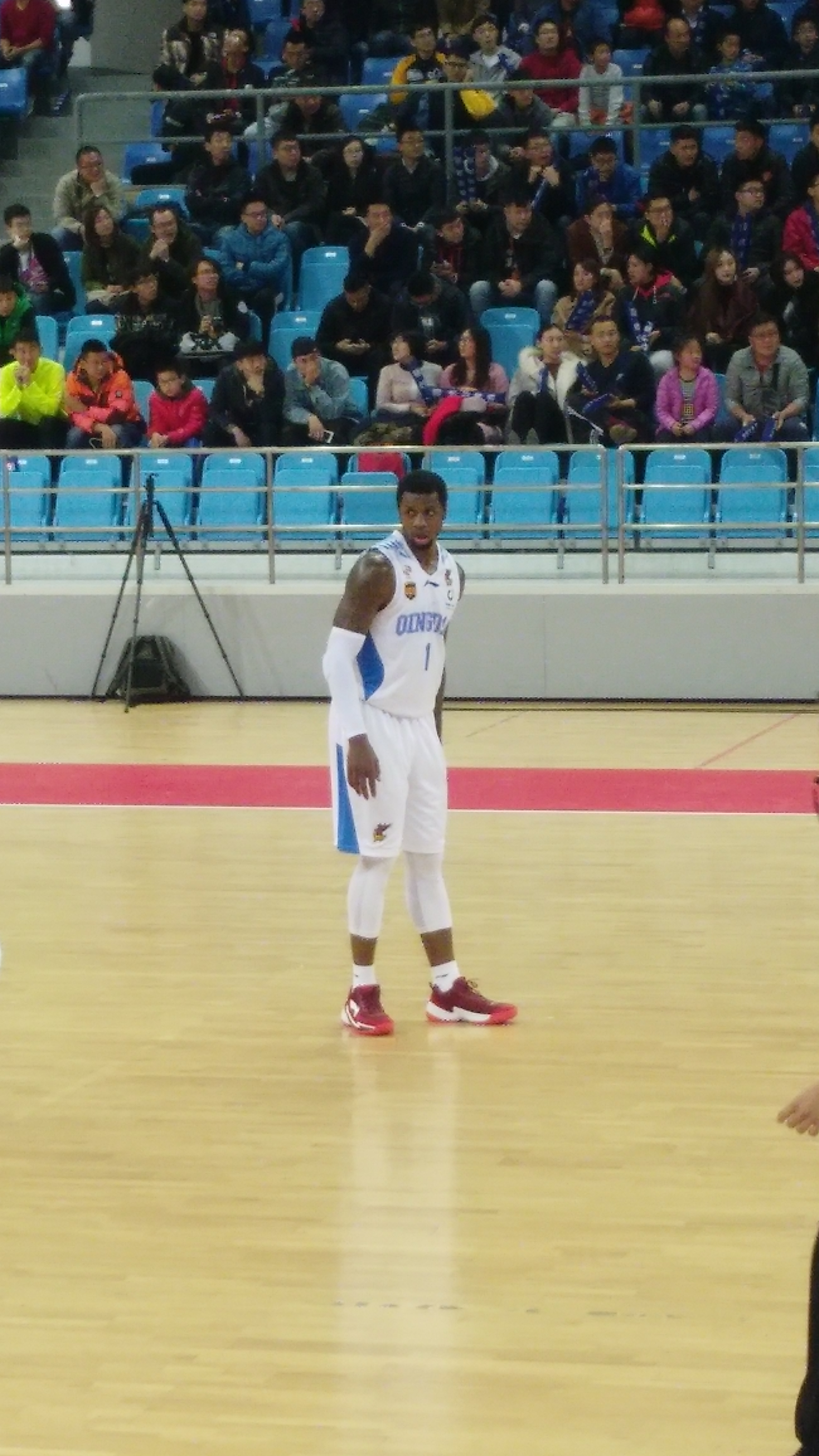
Jones with Qingdao in November 2017

On August 1, 2017, Jones signed with the Qingdao DoubleStar Eagles of the Chinese Basketball Association. After getting kicked out of practice following a confrontation with the head coach, Jones was released by Qingdao in late November. In nine games, he averaged 22.3 points, 11.2 rebounds, 3.2 assists, 1.2 steals and 2.3 blocks per game.

=== Santa Cruz Warriors (2017–2018) ===
On December 18, 2017, Jones was acquired by the Santa Cruz Warriors of the NBA G League.

=== Erie BayHawks (2018–2019) ===
For the 2018–19 season, Jones signed with the Erie BayHawks.

=== Return to Houston Rockets (2019) ===
On February 22, 2019, Jones signed a 10-day contract with the Houston Rockets. On March 4, he signed a second 10-day contract with the Rockets. On March 6, he spent a day with the Rio Grande Valley Vipers of the NBA G League on assignment. Upon the expiration of his second 10-day contract, he was not signed for the rest of the season by the Rockets.

=== TNT KaTropa (2019) ===
In May 2019, Jones signed with the TNT KaTropa of the Philippine Basketball Association as the team's import for the 2019 PBA Commissioner's Cup. In his PBA debut for the TNT Katropa, Jones recorded 41 points, 14 rebounds and 4 assists in almost 37 minutes of playing time in a win over the NLEX Road Warriors. In his next game, Jones fuels the TNT with 43 points, 22 rebounds, 5 assists, 3 steals and 5 threes in a win over the Alaska Aces. His 43 points and 22 rebounds were his career-highs for any league that he has played, including the NBA. A week later, Jones recorded yet another 40-point game, this time against the Phoenix Fuelmasters. Jones recorded 40 points, 10 rebounds, 6 assists and 4 steals in a 114–88 blowout win against the Fuelmasters. In this game, Jones and Phoenix Fuelmasters forward Calvin Abueva were involved in an on-court altercation that nearly led to a full-scale brawl between two sides. Abueva was ejected for the rest of the game for he ignited the altercation. Ten days after the incident, Jones and the TNT Katropa were up against the PBA defending champs, the Barangay Ginebra. However, Jones and his team rallied easily against the defending champs. Jones recorded a monster statline of 17 points, 14 rebounds, 16 assists and 6 blocks for the Katropa. It was his first professional career triple-double. Jones joins fellow imports, Justin Brownlee and Allen Durham as the only PBA imports to rack up a triple-double in a PBA game in the past decade. The following game, Jones recorded a career-high 49 points to go along with 18 rebounds and 4 assists in a dominating win over the Meralco Bolts. In the following game, Jones had another monster game as he recorded 39 points, 17 rebounds, 6 assists and 7 blocks in almost 47 minutes of playing time against the Columbian Dyip. On July 3, Jones recorded his second triple-double of the conference after having recorded 33 points, 21 rebounds and 13 assists in a 102–81 win over the Rain Or Shine Elasto Painters. On July 7, Jones recorded another triple-double as he racked up 36 points, 16 rebounds and 14 assists in a 115–97 win over the Blackwater Elite. After nine days, TNT played their last elimination game against the Purefoods Star Hotshots. Jones almost recorded his third straight triple-double, ending the game with 26 points, 13 rebounds and 8 assists in a 98–83 win over the Hotshots.

On August 11, 2019, Terrence Jones was crowned as the PBA's best import of the conference, dethroning Justin Brownlee of the Barangay Ginebra San Miguel.

=== Mets de Guaynabo (2020) ===
On October 21, 2020, it was reported that Mets de Guaynabo had added Jones to their roster.

On January 14, 2022, Jones signed with Yulon Luxgen Dinos of the Super Basketball League.

=== Grand Rapids Gold (2022) ===
On March 3, 2022, Jones was acquired via available player pool by the Grand Rapids Gold.

=== Cariduros de Fajardo (2022) ===
On May 9, 2022, Jones signed with Cariduros de Fajardo of the Baloncesto Superior Nacional (BSN). On July 12, 2022, Jones scored a career-high 49 points against the Leones de Ponce in the 2022 BSN's quarterfinals.

=== Kaohsiung Steelers (2022) ===
On October 28, 2022, Jones joined the Kaohsiung Steelers of Taiwan.

=== Leones de Ponce (2023) ===
On April 10, 2023, Jones was signed by the Leones de Ponce of the Baloncesto Superior Nacional (BSN) as an injury replacement for their import player Eric Paschall.

== NBA career statistics ==
Legend
GP	Games played	GS	Games started	MPG	Minutes per game
FG%	Field goal percentage	3P%	3-point field goal percentage	FT%	Free throw percentage
RPG	Rebounds per game	APG	Assists per game	SPG	Steals per game
BPG	Blocks per game	PPG	Points per game	**Bold**	Career high

=== Regular season ===
Year	Team	GP	GS	MPG	FG%	3P%	FT%	RPG	APG	SPG	BPG	PPG
2012–13	Houston	19	0	14.5	.457	.263	**.765**	3.4	.8	.6	1.0	5.5
2013–14	Houston	**76**	**71**	**27.3**	**.542**	.307	.605	**6.9**	**1.1**	.7	1.3	**12.1**
2014–15	Houston	33	24	26.9	.528	**.351**	.606	6.7	**1.1**	.5	**1.8**	11.7
2015–16	Houston	50	11	20.9	.452	.316	.664	4.2	.8	.5	.8	8.7
2016–17	New Orleans	51	12	24.8	.473	.253	.606	5.9	**1.1**	**.8**	1.0	11.5
2016–17	Milwaukee	3	0	2.0	.000	–	–	1.0	.0	.3	.3	.0
2018–19	Houston	2	0	2.5	.250	.000	.000	2.0	.0	.0	.0	1.0
Career		234	118	23.8	.501	.297	.621	5.7	1.0	.6	1.2	10.4

=== Playoffs ===
Year	Team	GP	GS	MPG	FG%	3P%	FT%	RPG	APG	SPG	BPG	PPG
2013	Houston	2	0	17.5	.400	.000	.000	**7.5**	.5	.0	.5	4.0
2014	Houston	6	2	23.0	**.513**	.000	.500	6.2	**1.3**	**.8**	.5	7.7
2015	Houston	**17**	**9**	**23.6**	.421	**.158**	**.667**	4.8	1.0	.5	**.7**	**10.2**
Career		25	11	23.0	.438	.136	.609	5.3	1.0	.5	.6	9.1

== International career statistics ==
Legend
GP	Games played	MPG	Minutes per game	FG%	Field goal percentage
3P%	3-point field goal percentage	FT%	Free throw percentage	RPG	Rebounds per game
APG	Assists per game	SPG	Steals per game	BPG	Blocks per game
PPG	Points per game	**Bold**	Career high		Led the league

As of the end of Game 2 of 2019 PBA Commissioners' Cup Finals:

Year	Team	League	GP	MPG	FG%	3P%	FT%	RPG	APG	SPG	BPG	PPG
2017–18	Qingdao Eagles	CBA	9	31.9	.461	.333	.603	11.2	3.2	1.2	2.3	22.3
2019	TNT	PBA	19	44.3	.461	.311	.596	15.4	7.5	1.7	2.8	30.7
Career		All Leagues	28	40.4	.461	.315	.597	14.0	6.1	1.5	2.7	28.0

== Personal life ==
Jones is cousins with fellow former NBA players Damon and Salim Stoudamire.

In July 2013, Jones was arrested for allegedly stomping on a homeless man who was sleeping outside a nightclub in Portland, Oregon. He was charged with harassment, a Class B misdemeanor, and released on his own recognizance.

Jones has a son with a Filipino woman.
