= Doron Lamb =

American basketball player (born 1991)

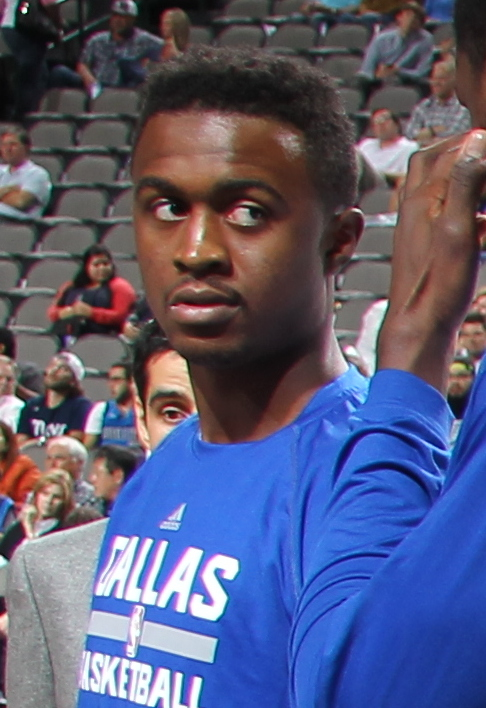
- Lamb with the Dallas Mavericks in 2014

Personal information
- Born: November 6, 1991 (age 35) New York City, New York, U.S.
- Listed height: 1.93 m (6 ft 4 in)
- Listed weight: 95 kg (209 lb)

Career information
- High school: Oak Hill Academy (Mouth of Wilson, Virginia)
- College: Kentucky (2010–2012)
- NBA draft: 2012: 2nd round, 42nd overall pick
- Drafted by: Milwaukee Bucks
- Playing career: 2012–2025
- Position: Shooting guard

Career history
- 2012–2013: Milwaukee Bucks
- 2013: →Fort Wayne Mad Ants
- 2013–2014: Orlando Magic
- 2014–2015: Texas Legends
- 2015: Westchester Knicks
- 2015: Budućnost Podgorica
- 2016: Nanterre 92
- 2016–2017: Westchester Knicks
- 2017–2019: Lavrio
- 2019–2020: Darüşşafaka
- 2021: Start Lublin
- 2021–2022: V.L. Pesaro
- 2022–2023: Scafati Basket
- 2023: New Basket Brindisi
- 2023: US Monastir
- 2024–2025: UEB Gesteco Cividale

Career highlights
- NCAA champion (2012); Second-team All-SEC (2012); SEC All-Rookie Team (2011); Second-team Parade All-American (2010); McDonald's All-American (2010)
- Stats at NBA.com
- Stats at Basketball Reference

Doron Emmanuel Calvin Lamb (born November 6, 1991) is an American former professional basketball player. He played college basketball for the University of Kentucky.

== High school career ==
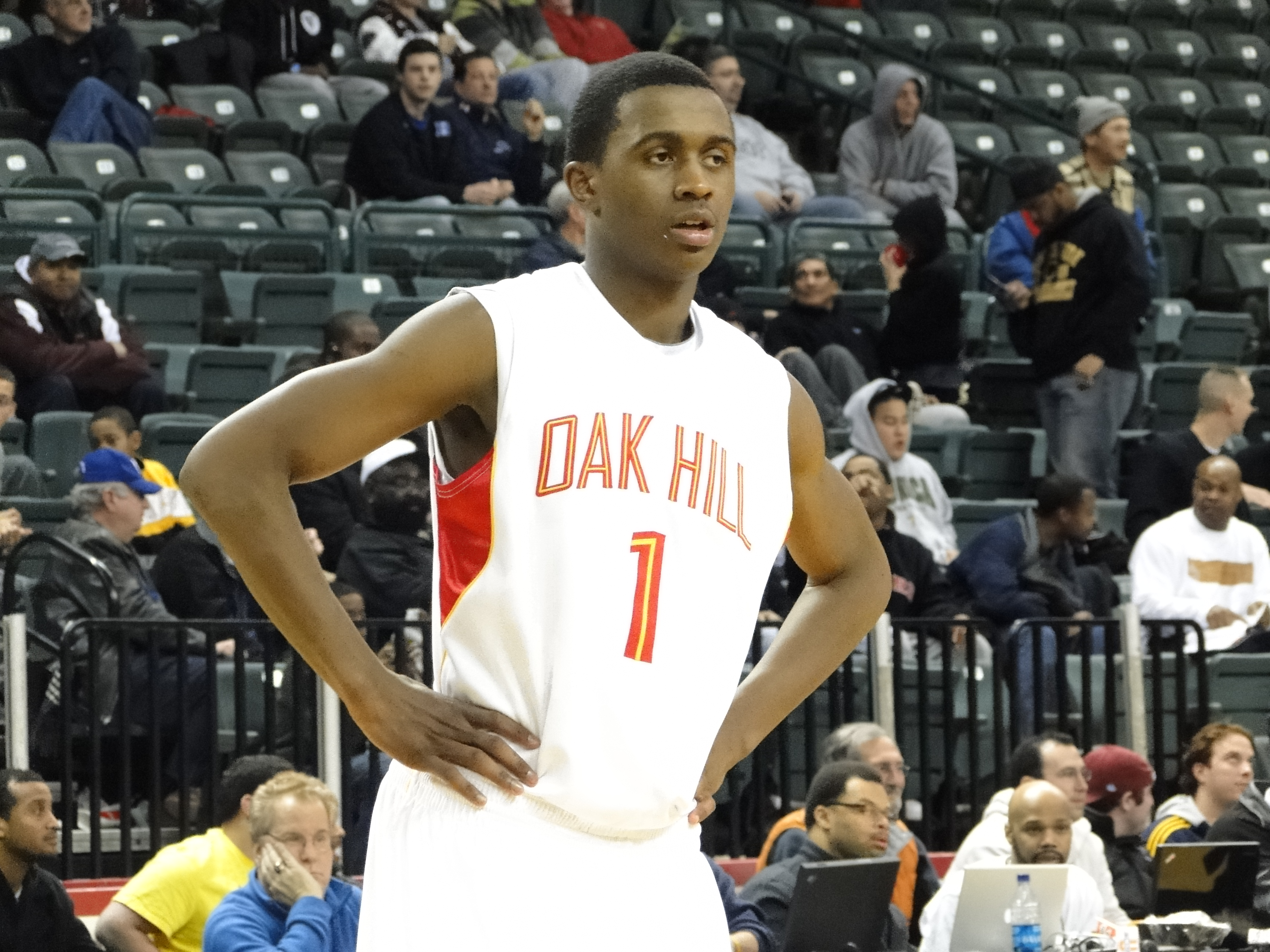
Lamb playing for Oak Hill Academy in 2009

Lamb was born in Queens, New York to father Calvin Lamb. He graduated from Oak Hill Academy. Lamb averaged 23 points, 6 rebounds and 4 assists per game his senior season, which led to McDonald's All-American and Jordan Brand Classic selections. Considered a five-star recruit by Rivals.com, Lamb was listed as the No. 3 shooting guard and the No. 21 player in the nation in 2010.

== College career ==
Lamb committed to play collegiate basketball for the University of Kentucky. In his freshman year, the Wildcats advanced to the NCAA Final Four and lost by a single point to the University of Connecticut Huskies. In his sophomore year, the Wildcats achieved an NCAA record 38–2 record and won the 2012 NCAA Championship. While he was a great scorer at the rim and midrange, Lamb was most known for his consistently great three-point shooting, shooting over 46% from beyond the arc both of his seasons in college. Lamb scored a game-high 22 points in the 2012 national championship against Kansas, where Kentucky won, giving the Wildcats their eighth NCAA championship.

=== College statistics ===
Year	Team	GP	GS	MPG	FG%	3P%	FT%	RPG	APG	SPG	BPG	PPG
2010–11	Kentucky Wildcats	38	14	28.4	.497	.486	.790	2.7	1.6	.6	.2	12.3
2011–12	Kentucky Wildcats	40	35	31.2	.474	.466	.826	2.7	1.5	.5	.1	13.7

== Professional career ==
In April 2012, Lamb declared for the 2012 NBA draft along with teammates Anthony Davis, Marquis Teague, Terrence Jones, and Michael Kidd-Gilchrist. Lamb was selected by the Milwaukee Bucks with the 42nd overall pick. On July 11, 2012, he signed a multi-year contract with the Bucks.

On January 12, 2013, Lamb was assigned to the Fort Wayne Mad Ants of the NBA D-League. He was recalled on January 21, 2013, reassigned on February 3, 2013, and recalled again on February 10, 2013.

Lamb was traded to the Orlando Magic along with Tobias Harris and Beno Udrih for JJ Redick, Gustavo Ayon, and Ish Smith at the trade deadline on February 21, 2013.

On June 30, 2014, Lamb was waived by the Magic.

On September 22, 2014, Lamb signed with the Dallas Mavericks. However, he was later waived by the Mavericks on October 25, 2014. On November 3, 2014, he was acquired by the Texas Legends as an affiliate player.

On February 19, 2015, Lamb was traded, along with a 2015 sixth-round pick, to the Westchester Knicks in exchange for the Idaho Stampede's 2015 second-round pick and the returning player rights to Luke Harangody and Jeff Adrien. On March 31, he was ruled out for the rest of the 2014–15 season with a wrist injury. His D-League rights are still retained by Westchester for the next two seasons.

In July 2015, Lamb joined the Golden State Warriors for the 2015 Summer League.

On November 25, 2015, Lamb signed a contract with Budućnost Podgorica of Montenegro. He left Budućnost after appearing in only one game, and on December 23, 2015, he signed with Torku Konyaspor of the Turkish Basketball Super League. However, only two days later he was released after failing to pass physicals.

On February 8, 2016, Lamb signed a tryout contract with Manital Torino of Italy. However, he did not stay with Torino and on February 24, he signed a one-month contract with JSF Nanterre of the French LNB Pro A.

On November 16, 2016, Lamb was reacquired by the Westchester Knicks.

On June 6, 2017, Lamb signed with Greek club Lavrio for the 2017–18 season. Lamb left the Greek team temporarily before the end of the season to address family matters, but then re-signed with them for another season on August 14, 2018.

On July 8, 2019, Lamb signed with Turkish club Darüşşafaka that competes in the EuroCup. He averaged 9.9 points and 2.3 assists per game. On March 22, 2020, Lamb and the Turkish club mutually agreed to part ways, amidst the Coronavirus pandemic.

On August 5, 2021, he has signed with Start Lublin of the PLK. Lamb did not conclude the season with Star Lublin signing in the Italian Serie A with Victoria Libertas Pesaro on November 24, 2021.

On August 7, 2022, he has signed with Scafati Basket of the Lega Basket Serie A.

On January 18, 2023, he signed with New Basket Brindisi of the Lega Basket Serie A.

In October 2023, Lamb joined the Tunisian champions US Monastir.

In January 2024, Lamb joined Italian club UEB Gesteco Cividale of the Serie A2, the country's second-tier division.

== NBA career statistics ==
Legend
GP	Games played	GS	Games started	MPG	Minutes per game
FG%	Field goal percentage	3P%	3-point field goal percentage	FT%	Free throw percentage
RPG	Rebounds per game	APG	Assists per game	SPG	Steals per game
BPG	Blocks per game	PPG	Points per game	**Bold**	Career high

=== Regular season ===
Year	Team	GP	GS	MPG	FG%	3P%	FT%	RPG	APG	SPG	BPG	PPG
2012–13	Milwaukee	23	0	12.2	.347	.250	.533	.7	**.9**	**.3**	.0	3.4
2012–13	Orlando	24	0	12.4	**.397**	**.476**	.632	**1.2**	.5	**.3**	.0	3.2
2013–14	Orlando	**53**	0	**13.1**	.394	.400	**.806**	.9	.8	.2	.0	**3.6**
Career		100	0	12.7	.381	.394	.700	1.0	.8	.2	.0	3.5
