= 2011–12 Kansas Jayhawks men's basketball team =

American college basketball season

2011–12 Kansas Jayhawks men's basketball

NCAA tournament, Runner-up Big 12 regular season champions

National Championship Game, L 59–67 vs. Kentucky
- Conference: Big 12

Ranking
- Coaches: No. 2
- AP: No. 6
- Record: 32–7 (16–2 Big 12)
- Head coach: Bill Self (9th Season)
- Assistant coaches: Joe Dooley (9th season); Danny Manning (5th season); Kurtis Townsend (8th season)
- Captains: Thomas Robinson; Tyshawn Taylor
- Home arena: Allen Fieldhouse

2011–12 Big 12 men's basketball standings
	Conf.				Overall
Team	W		L	PCT	W		L	PCT
No. 6 Kansas	16	–	2	.889	32	–	7	.821
No. 3 Missouri †	14	–	4	.778	30	–	5	.857
Iowa State	12	–	6	.667	23	–	11	.676
No. 9 Baylor	12	–	6	.667	30	–	8	.789
Kansas State	10	–	8	.556	22	–	11	.667
Texas	9	–	9	.500	20	–	14	.588
Oklahoma State	7	–	11	.389	15	–	18	.455
Oklahoma	5	–	13	.278	15	–	16	.484
Texas A&M	4	–	14	.222	14	–	18	.438
Texas Tech	1	–	17	.056	8	–	23	.258
† 2012 Big 12 Tournament winner Rankings from AP poll

The 2011–12 Kansas Jayhawks men's basketball team represented the University of Kansas in the 2011–12 NCAA Division I men's basketball season, which was the Jayhawks' 114th basketball season. As in every season since 1955–56, the team played its home games at Allen Fieldhouse on its campus in Lawrence, Kansas, US. After defeating rival Missouri on February 25, the Jayhawks clinched their 8th straight outright Big 12 championship. After defeating North Carolina, the Jayhawks advanced to their 14th Final Four in school history, where they defeated Ohio State 64–62 in the national semifinals. On April 2, Kansas faced Kentucky for the national title, losing to the favored Wildcats 67–59. Kansas had played both of its Final Four opponents during the regular season, losing to Kentucky on November 15 and defeating Ohio State on December 10. They finished the season with a 32–7 overall record, and 16–2 in Big 12 play.

== Pre–season ==
=== Departures ===
The Jayhawks lost graduating seniors Brady Morningstar, Tyrel Reed, and Mario Little. Juniors and twin brothers Markieff Morris and Marcus Morris, plus freshman Josh Selby, departed early to enter the 2011 NBA draft. On June 23, Markieff and Marcus were drafted #13 and #14, respectively, in the first round of the draft, while Selby went in the second. Royce Woolridge also announced on April 16, 2011 his intent to transfer to another school for the following year, signing with Washington State.

=== Recruiting ===
On October 12, 2010, 4-star point guard Naadir Tharpe signed a letter of intent to join the Jayhawks as a freshman for the 2011–12 season. The 6-foot prep all-star chose Kansas over offers from Oklahoma, Minnesota, Boston College, Marquette, NC State, UNLV and others. He was previously committed to Providence. On January 24, 2011, combo-guard Christian Garrett joined the team as a walk-on. He was also recruited by NC State, Auburn, Alabama, and others. On April 3, 2011, 5-star shooting guard Ben McLemore from St. Louis, Missouri, verbally committed to Kansas after the Next All-American Classic High-School All-Star Game, over offers from Missouri, Tennessee, Illinois, Arkansas, Purdue, and others. On April 10, 2011, Canadian forward Braeden Anderson committed to the Jayhawks over Kentucky, Arizona, Memphis, and Missouri. Jamari Traylor joined in May, while June saw the additions of Kevin Young and Merv Lindsay.

==== Eligibility ====
Three of Kansas' six recruits were declared ineligible for the 2011–12 season. Braeden Anderson was not approved to play by the Big 12 Conference due to their policy on partial qualifiers. Ben McLemore and Jamari Traylor were also declared ineligible but were able to practice with the team during the spring semester, and would be eligible to play in the 2012–13 season.

==== Class of 2011 ====
College recruiting
Name	Hometown	School	Height	Weight	Commit date
Ben McLemore; SG	St. Louis, Missouri	Christian Life Center Academy	6 ft 5 in (1.96 m)	185 lb (84 kg)	Apr 3, 2011
Ben McLemore; SG	Recruit ratings: Scout: Rivals: 247Sports: ESPN: (95)				
Naadir Tharpe; PG	Worcester, MA	Brewster Academy	5 ft 11 in (1.80 m)	170 lb (77 kg)	Oct 12, 2010
Naadir Tharpe; PG	Recruit ratings: Scout: Rivals: 247Sports: ESPN: (93)				
Jamari Traylor; PF	Chicago, Illinois	IMG Academy (FL)	6 ft 7 in (2.01 m)	220 lb (100 kg)	May 18, 2011
Jamari Traylor; PF	Recruit ratings: Scout: Rivals: 247Sports: ESPN: (89)				
Mervyn Lindsay; SF	Moreno Valley, California	Canyon Springs HS	6 ft 5 in (1.96 m)	180 lb (82 kg)	Jun 23, 2011
Mervyn Lindsay; SF	Recruit ratings: Scout: Rivals: 247Sports: ESPN: (77)				
Overall recruiting rankings: Scout: 28 Rivals: 28 247 Sports: 17 ESPN: 22

Transfers

College recruiting
Name	Hometown	School	Height	Weight	Commit date
Kevin Young; PF	Perris, California	Perris HS / Loyola Marymount University	6 ft 8 in (2.03 m)	195 lb (88 kg)	Jun 16, 2011
Kevin Young; PF	Recruit ratings: (67)				

== Roster ==
2011–12 Kansas Jayhawks men's basketball team
Players
Coaches

Pos.	#	Name	Height	Weight	Year	Hometown
F	0	Thomas Robinson	6 ft 9 in (2.06 m)	237 lb (108 kg)	Jr	Washington, DC
G	1	Naadir Tharpe	5 ft 11 in (1.8 m)	170 lb (77 kg)	Fr	Worcester, MA
G	2	Conner Teahan	6 ft 5 in (1.96 m)	210 lb (95 kg)	RS Sr	Leawood, KS
F	4	Justin Wesley	6 ft 8 in (2.03 m)	200 lb (91 kg)	RS So	Fort Worth, TX
C	5	Jeff Withey	7 ft 0 in (2.13 m)	235 lb (107 kg)	RS Jr	San Diego, CA
G	10	Tyshawn Taylor	6 ft 3 in (1.91 m)	185 lb (84 kg)	Sr	Hoboken, NJ
G	15	Elijah Johnson	6 ft 4 in (1.93 m)	195 lb (88 kg)	Jr	North Las Vegas, NV
G	20	Niko Roberts	5 ft 11 in (1.8 m)	175 lb (79 kg)	So	Huntington, NY
G	21	Christian Garrett	6 ft 5 in (1.96 m)	170 lb (77 kg)	Fr	Los Angeles, CA
F	22	Merv Lindsay	6 ft 5 in (1.96 m)	180 lb (82 kg)	Fr	Moreno Valley, CA
G	23	Ben McLemore (I)	6 ft 5 in (1.96 m)	185 lb (84 kg)	Fr	St. Louis, MO
G	24	Travis Releford	6 ft 5 in (1.96 m)	207 lb (94 kg)	RS Jr	Shawnee Mission, KSlink=y
G	25	Jordan Juenemann	6 ft 3 in (1.91 m)	195 lb (88 kg)	Sr	Hays, KS
F	31	Jamari Traylor (I)	6 ft 8 in (2.03 m)	215 lb (98 kg)	Fr	Chicago, IL
F	40	Kevin Young	6 ft 8 in (2.03 m)	195 lb (88 kg)	Jr	Perris, CA

Head coach

- Bill Self (Oklahoma State)

Assistant coach(es)

- Danny Manning (Kansas)
- Joe Dooley (George Washington)
- Kurtis Townsend (Western Kentucky)

Legend

- (C) Team captain
- (S) Suspended
- (I) Ineligible
- (W) Walk-on
- Injured
- Current redshirt

Roster
Last update: 2011-06-20

== Schedule ==
Date time, TV	Rank^{#}	Opponent^{#}	Result	Record	High points	High rebounds	High assists	Site (attendance) city, state
Exhibition
November 1, 2011*; 7:00 pm, Jayhawk; Network	No. 13	Pittsburg State	W 84–55	–	21 – Teahan	12 – Withey	8 – Tharpe	Allen Fieldhouse (16,300); Lawrence, KS
November 8, 2011*; 7:00 pm, Jayhawk; Network	No. 13	Fort Hays State	W 101–52	–	22 – Robinson	12 – Robinson	7 – Tharpe	Allen Fieldhouse (16,300); Lawrence, KS
Non-conference regular season
November 11, 2011*; 7:00 pm, Jayhawk; Network	No. 13	Towson; Maui Invitational Opening Round	W 100–54	1–0	18 – Robinson	11 – Robinson	8 – Johnson	Allen Fieldhouse (16,300); Lawrence, KS
November 15, 2011*; 8:00 pm, ESPN	No. 12	vs. No. 2 Kentucky; Champions Classic	L 65–75	1–1	22 – Taylor	15 – Robinson	4 – Johnson	Madison Square Garden (19,979); New York, NY
November 21, 2011*; 11:50 pm, ESPN2	No. 14	vs. Georgetown; Maui Invitational Quarterfinals	W 67–63	2–1	20 – Robinson	12 – Robinson	5 – Johnson	Lahaina Civic Center (2,400); Maui, HI
November 22, 2011*; 9:30, ESPN	No. 14	vs. UCLA; Maui Invitational Semifinals	W 72–56	3–1	23 – Johnson	10 – Robinson	6 – Taylor	Lahaina Civic Center (2,400); Maui, HI
November 23, 2011*; 10:00 pm, ESPN	No. 14	vs. No. 6 Duke; Maui Invitational Championship	L 61–68	3–2	17 – Taylor	18 – Robinson	4 – Taylor	Lahaina Civic Center (2,400); Maui, HI
November 30, 2011*; 7:00 pm, Jayhawk; Network	No. 15	Florida Atlantic	W 77–54	4–2	19 – Robinson	21 – Robinson	4 – Releford	Allen Fieldhouse (16,300); Lawrence, KS
December 3, 2011*; 4:15 pm, ESPN2	No. 15	South Florida	W 70–42	5–2	24 – Taylor	8 – Robinson	5 – Taylor	Allen Fieldhouse (16,300); Lawrence, KS
December 6, 2011*; 8:00 pm, ESPNU	No. 13	Long Beach State	W 88–80	6–2	26 – Robinson	13 – Withey	5 – Johnson	Allen Fieldhouse (16,300); Lawrence, KS
December 10, 2011*; 2:15 pm, ESPN	No. 13	No. 2 Ohio State	W 78–67	7–2	21 – Robinson	7 – (2 tied)	13 – Taylor	Allen Fieldhouse (16,300); Lawrence, KS
December 19, 2011*; 8:00 pm, ESPNU	No. 12	vs. Davidson; M&I Bank Kansas City Shootout	L 74–80	7–3	21 – Robinson	18 – Robinson	7 – Taylor	Sprint Center (18,757); Kansas City, MO
December 22, 2011*; 10:00 pm, FSN	No. 12	at USC	W 63–47	8–3	13 – Teahan	9 – (2 tied)	4 – Johnson	Galen Center (6,431); Los Angeles, CA
December 29, 2011*; 7:00 pm, Jayhawk; Network	No. 17	Howard	W 89–34	9–3	13 – (2 tied)	7 – Robinson	5 – (2 tied)	Allen Fieldhouse (16,300); Lawrence, KS
December 31, 2011*; 7:00 pm, ESPNU	No. 17	North Dakota	W 84–58	10–3	30 – Robinson	21 – Robinson	7 – Johnson	Allen Fieldhouse (16,300); Lawrence, KS
January 4, 2012; 7:00 pm, Big 12 Network	No. 14	No. 23 Kansas State; Sunflower Showdown	W 67–49	11–3 (1–0)	16 – Releford	14 – Robinson	5 – Johnson	Allen Fieldhouse (16,300); Lawrence, KS
January 7, 2012; 1:00 pm, ESPNU	No. 14	at Oklahoma	W 72–61	12–3 (2–0)	28 – Releford	9 – Robinson	6 – Taylor	Lloyd Noble Center (11,268); Norman, OK
January 11, 2012; 8:00 pm, ESPNU	No. 10	at Texas Tech	W 81–46	13–3 (3–0)	19 – Robinson	12 – Robinson	5 – Taylor	United Spirit Arena (7,454); Lubbock, TX
January 14, 2012; 3:00 pm, Big 12 Network	No. 10	Iowa State	W 82–73	14–3 (4–0)	28 – Taylor	14 – Robinson	6 – Taylor	Allen Fieldhouse (16,300); Lawrence, KS
January 16, 2012; 8:30 pm, ESPN	No. 7	No. 3 Baylor	W 92–74	15–3 (5–0)	28 – Taylor	14 – Robinson	6 – Taylor	Allen Fieldhouse (16,300); Lawrence, KS
January 21, 2012; 3:00 pm, CBS	No. 7	at Texas	W 69–66	16–3 (6–0)	22 – Taylor	9 – Robinson	4 – Taylor	Frank Erwin Center (16,734); Austin, TX
January 23, 2012; 8:00 pm, ESPN	No. 5	Texas A&M	W 64–54	17–3 (7–0)	18 – Robinson	10 – Robinson	4 – Releford	Allen Fieldhouse (16,300); Lawrence, KS
January 28, 2012; 1:00 pm, ESPN	No. 5	at Iowa State	L 64-72	17–4 (7–1)	16 – Taylor	7 – Robinson	10 – Taylor	Hilton Coliseum (14,376); Ames, IA
February 1, 2012; 8:00 pm, ESPNU	No. 8	Oklahoma	W 84–62	18–4 (8–1)	21 – Taylor	17 – Robinson	6 – Taylor	Allen Fieldhouse (16,300); Lawrence, KS
February 4, 2012; 8:00 pm, ESPN	No. 8	at No. 4 Missouri; Border War, ESPN College GameDay	L 71–74	18–5 (8–2)	25 – Robinson	13 – Robinson	4 – Johnson	Mizzou Arena (15,061); Columbia, MO
February 8, 2012; 8:00 pm, ESPN2	No. 7	at No. 6 Baylor	W 68–54	19–5 (9–2)	25 – Withey	11 – Robinson	5 – Johnson	Ferrell Center (10,334); Waco, TX
February 11, 2012; 3:00 pm, Big 12 Network	No. 7	Oklahoma State	W 81–66	20–5 (10–2)	24 – Robinson	20 – Withey	6 – Taylor	Allen Fieldhouse (16,300); Lawrence, KS
February 13, 2012; 8:00 pm, ESPN	No. 4	at Kansas State; Sunflower Showdown	W 59–53	21–5 (11–2)	20 – Taylor	11 – Withey	5 – (2 Tied)	Bramlage Coliseum (12,528); Manhattan, KS
February 18, 2012; 7:00 pm, Big 12 Network	No. 4	Texas Tech	W 83–50	22–5 (12–2)	16 – Robinson	8 – (2 tied)	5 – Robinson	Allen Fieldhouse (16,300); Lawrence, KS
February 22, 2012; 8:00 pm, ESPN2	No. 4	at Texas A&M	W 66–58	23–5 (13–2)	21 – Johnson	13 – Robinson	4 – (2 tied)	Reed Arena (6,868); College Station, TX
February 25, 2012; 3:00 pm, CBS	No. 4	No. 3 Missouri; Border War	W 87–86 ^{OT}	24–5 (14–2)	28 – Robinson	12 – Robinson	8 – Johnson	Allen Fieldhouse (16,300); Lawrence, KS
February 27, 2012; 8:00 pm, ESPN	No. 3	at Oklahoma State	W 70–58	25–5 (15–2)	27 – Taylor	11 – Robinson	6 – Johnson	Gallagher-Iba Arena (10,552); Stillwater, OK
March 3, 2012; 8:00 pm, ESPN	No. 3	Texas	W 73–63	26–5 (16–2)	27 – Robinson	14 – Robinson	4 – Taylor	Allen Fieldhouse (16,300); Lawrence, KS
Big 12 Tournament
March 8, 2012; 2:00 pm, ESPN2	No. 3	vs. Texas A&M; Quarterfinals	W 83–66	27–5	26 – Johnson	10 – Robinson	4 – (3 tied)	Sprint Center (18,972); Kansas City, MO
March 9, 2012; 6:30 pm, Big 12 Network/ESPNU	No. 3	vs. No. 12 Baylor; Semifinals	L 72–81	27–6	20 – Taylor	9 – Robinson	3 – Taylor	Sprint Center (18,972); Kansas City, MO
NCAA Tournament
March 16, 2012*; 9:18 pm, truTV	(2) No. 6	vs. (15) Detroit; Second Round	W 65–50	28–6	16 – Robinson	13 – Robinson	2 – 4 tied	CenturyLink Center Omaha (17,015); Omaha, NE
March 18, 2012*; 7:40 pm, TNT	(2) No. 6	vs. (10) Purdue; Third Round	W 63–60	29–6	18 – Johnson	13 – Robinson	4 – Taylor	CenturyLink Center Omaha (16,998); Omaha, NE
March 23, 2012*; 9:35 pm, TBS	(2) No. 6	vs. (11) NC State; Sweet Sixteen	W 60–57	30–6	18 – Robinson	15 – Robinson	5 – Taylor	Edward Jones Dome (23,964); St. Louis, MO
March 25, 2012*; 4:05 pm, CBS	(2) No. 6	vs. (1) No. 4 North Carolina; Elite Eight	W 80–67	31–6	22 – Taylor	9 – Robinson	5 – 2 tied	Edward Jones Dome (23,565); St. Louis, MO
March 31, 2012*; 7:49 pm, CBS	(2) No. 6	vs. (2) No. 7 Ohio State; Final Four	W 64–62	32–6	19 – Robinson	10 – Johnson	8 – Taylor	Mercedes-Benz Superdome (73,361); New Orleans, LA
April 2, 2012*; 9:23 pm, CBS	(2) No. 6	vs. (1) No. 1 Kentucky; National Championship game	L 59–67	32–7	19 – Taylor	17 – Robinson	3 – Taylor	Mercedes-Benz Superdome (70,913); New Orleans, LA
*Non-conference game. ^{#}Rankings from AP Poll. (#) Tournament seedings in parentheses. All times are in Central Time.

== Rankings ==
Ranking movements Legend: ██ Increase in ranking ██ Decrease in ranking
	Week																			
Poll	Pre	1	2	3	4	5	6	7	8	9	10	11	12	13	14	15	16	17	18	Final
AP	13	12	14	15	13	12	12	17	14	10	7	5	8	7	4	4	3	3	6	
Coaches	13	11	14	14	13	12	11	18	15	10	7	5	8	10	5	5	4	3	6	2

== Awards ==
Bill Self

- Big 12 Co-Coach of the Year
- Naismith College Coach of the Year
- Sporting News National Coach of the Year and Big 12 Coach of the Year
- Adolph Rupp Cup

Thomas Robinson

- 1st Team All-American (Sporting News, USBWA, NABC, ESPN.com, AP, John R. Wooden)
- ESPN.com National Player of the Year
- Big 12 Player of the Year and 1st Team All-Big 12
- Sporting News Big 12 Player of the Year
- Associated Press Big 12 Player of the Year and 1st Team All-Big 12
- 4x Phillips 66 Big 12 Player of the Week (November 28, December 12, January 2, February 27)

Tyshawn Taylor

- 1st Team All-Big 12
- Associated Press 1st Team All-Big 12
- 2x Phillips 66 Big 12 Player of the Week (January 16, March 4)
- Sporting News 3rd Team All-American
- USBWA 3rd Team All-American
- NABC All-District 8 First Team
- Associated Press 3rd Team All-American

Jeff Withey

- Big 12 Defensive Player of the Year
- Big 12 All-Defensive Team and 3rd Team
