= 2011–12 Kentucky Wildcats men's basketball team =

2011–12 season of University of Kentucky men's basketball team

2011–12 Kentucky Wildcats men's basketball

NCAA tournament National Champions SEC regular season champions

National Championship Game, W 67–59 vs. Kansas
- Conference: Southeastern Conference

Ranking
- Coaches: No. 1
- AP: No. 1
- Record: 38–2 (16–0 SEC)
- Head coach: John Calipari (3rd season)
- Assistant coaches: John Robic (3rd season); Orlando Antigua (3rd season); Kenny Payne (2nd season)
- Home arena: Rupp Arena

2011–12 Southeastern Conference men's basketball standings
| | Conf. | | | | Overall |
| Team | W | | L | PCT | W | | L | PCT |
|---|---|---|---|---|---|---|---|---|
| No. 1 Kentucky | 16 | – | 0 | 1.000 | 38 | – | 2 | .950 |
| No. 25 Florida | 10 | – | 6 | .625 | 26 | – | 11 | .703 |
| No. 20 Vanderbilt † | 10 | – | 6 | .625 | 25 | – | 11 | .694 |
| Tennessee | 10 | – | 6 | .625 | 19 | – | 15 | .559 |
| Alabama | 9 | – | 7 | .563 | 21 | – | 12 | .636 |
| Mississippi State | 8 | – | 8 | .500 | 21 | – | 12 | .636 |
| Ole Miss | 8 | – | 8 | .500 | 20 | – | 14 | .588 |
| LSU | 7 | – | 9 | .438 | 18 | – | 15 | .545 |
| Arkansas | 6 | – | 10 | .375 | 18 | – | 14 | .563 |
| Auburn | 5 | – | 11 | .313 | 15 | – | 16 | .484 |
| Georgia | 5 | – | 11 | .313 | 15 | – | 17 | .469 |
| South Carolina | 2 | – | 14 | .125 | 10 | – | 21 | .323 |
† 2012 SEC tournament winner As of April 2, 2012; Rankings from AP poll

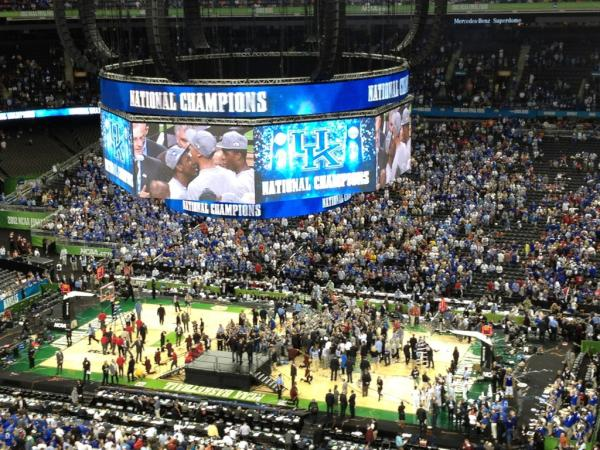
2012 NCAA champions

The 2011–12 Kentucky Wildcats men's basketball team represented the University of Kentucky in the 2011–12 college basketball season. The team's head coach was John Calipari, who was in his third season after taking the Wildcats to their first Final Four in thirteen seasons. The team won the 2012 NCAA Championship, bringing Kentucky its eighth title. The team's 38 wins broke a record shared by 5 teams for the most wins in NCAA men's Division I history.

== Pre-season ==
=== Departures ===
Former Wildcats Josh Harrellson, Brandon Knight and DeAndre Liggins were all selected in the 2011 NBA draft. Knight was taken No. 8 overall by the Detroit Pistons, Harrellson was selected No. 45 overall by the New Orleans Pelicans while the Oklahoma City Thunder selected Liggins at No. 53. The trio increased UK's total under John Calipari to 8 players selected in the Draft, including 6 in the first round.

| Name | Number | Pos. | Height | Weight | Year | Hometown | Notes |
|---|---|---|---|---|---|---|---|
| Brandon Knight | 12 | G | 6'3" | 195 | Freshman | Fort Lauderdale, Florida | Entered 2011 NBA draft |
| DeAndre Liggins | 34 | G | 6'6" | 215 | Junior | Chicago, Illinois | Entered 2011 NBA draft |
| Josh Harrellson | 55 | C | 6'10" | 275 | Senior | St. Charles, Missouri | Graduated |

=== Class of 2011 signees ===
For the third consecutive season the Wildcats boasted the No. 1 recruiting class. Anthony Davis, Michael Kidd-Gilchrist, Marquis Teague, Kyle Wiltjer formed the four-member freshman class for the 2011–12 season.

- Davis was the nation's consensus No. 1 overall player
- Kidd-Gilchrist was the nation's consensus No. 1 small forward
- Teague was the nation's consensus No. 1 point guard, the fourth straight for John Calipari

College recruiting information
| Name | Hometown | School | Height | Weight | Commit date |
|---|---|---|---|---|---|
| Anthony Davis; PF | Chicago, Illinois | Perspectives Charter School | 6 ft 10 in (2.08 m) | 220 lb (100 kg) | Aug 13, 2010 |
| Anthony Davis; PF | Recruit ratings: Scout: Rivals: (98) | | | | |
| Michael Kidd-Gilchrist; SF | Somerdale, New Jersey | St. Patrick | 6 ft 7 in (2.01 m) | 225 lb (102 kg) | Apr 14, 2010 |
| Michael Kidd-Gilchrist; SF | Recruit ratings: Scout: Rivals: (98) | | | | |
| Marquis Teague; PG | Indianapolis, Indiana | Pike | 6 ft 2 in (1.88 m) | 190 lb (86 kg) | Apr 22, 2010 |
| Marquis Teague; PG | Recruit ratings: Scout: Rivals: (98) | | | | |
| Kyle Wiltjer; PF | Portland, Oregon | Jesuit | 6 ft 9 in (2.06 m) | 225 lb (102 kg) | Aug 28, 2010 |
| Kyle Wiltjer; PF | Recruit ratings: Scout: Rivals: (97) | | | | |
Overall recruit ranking: Scout: 1 Rivals: 1
Note: In many cases, Scout, Rivals, 247Sports, On3, and ESPN may conflict in their listings of height and weight.; In these cases, the average was taken. ESPN grades are on a 100-point scale.; Sources: "Kentucky 2011 Basketball Commitments". Rivals.; "2011 Kentucky Basketball Commits". Scout.; "ESPN". ESPN.; "Scout.com Team Recruiting Rankings". Scout.; "2011 Team Ranking". Rivals.

=== Class of 2012 signees ===
College recruiting information (2012)
| Name | Hometown | School | Height | Weight | Commit date |
|---|---|---|---|---|---|
| Willie Cauley-Stein; C | Spearville, Kansas | Olathe Northwest | 7 ft 0 in (2.13 m) | 225 lb (102 kg) | Oct 31, 2011 |
| Willie Cauley-Stein; C | Recruit ratings: Scout: Rivals: (95) | | | | |
| Archie Goodwin; G | Little Rock, Arkansas | Sylvan Hills | 6 ft 4 in (1.93 m) | 185 lb (84 kg) | Sep 20, 2011 |
| Archie Goodwin; G | Recruit ratings: Scout: Rivals: (97) | | | | |
| Nerlens Noel; C | Everett, Massachusetts | Tilton | 6 ft 10 in (2.08 m) | 200 lb (91 kg) | Apr 12, 2012 |
| Nerlens Noel; C | Recruit ratings: Scout: Rivals: (98) | | | | |
| Alex Poythress; SF | Clarksville, Tennessee | Northeast | 6 ft 8 in (2.03 m) | 220 lb (100 kg) | Nov 10, 2011 |
| Alex Poythress; SF | Recruit ratings: Scout: Rivals: (97) | | | | |
Overall recruit ranking:
Note: In many cases, Scout, Rivals, 247Sports, On3, and ESPN may conflict in their listings of height and weight.; In these cases, the average was taken. ESPN grades are on a 100-point scale.; Sources: "Kentucky 2012 Basketball Commitments". Rivals.; "2012 Kentucky Basketball Commits". Scout.; "ESPN". ESPN.; "Scout.com Team Recruiting Rankings". Scout.; "2012 Team Ranking". Rivals.

== Roster ==
2011–12 Kentucky Wildcats men's basketball team
Players
Coaches

| Pos. | # | Name | Height | Weight | Year | Previous school | Hometown |
|---|---|---|---|---|---|---|---|
| SF | 1 | Darius Miller | 6 ft 8 in (2.03 m) | 235 lb (107 kg) | Sr | Mason County | Maysville, Kentucky |
| PF | 3 | Terrence Jones | 6 ft 9 in (2.06 m) | 252 lb (114 kg) | So | Jefferson | Portland, Oregon |
| SG | 4 | Jon Hood (redshirt) | 6 ft 7 in (2.01 m) | 215 lb (98 kg) | Jr | Madisonville North Hopkins | Madisonville, Kentucky |
| PG | 5 | Jarrod Polson | 6 ft 2 in (1.88 m) | 185 lb (84 kg) | So | West Jessamine | Wilmore, Kentucky |
| SG | 10 | Twany Beckham | 6 ft 5 in (1.96 m) | 205 lb (93 kg) | Jr | Ballard | Louisville, Kentucky |
| PG | 12 | Ryan Harrow (redshirt) | 6 ft 2 in (1.88 m) | 175 lb (79 kg) | So | Walton; North Carolina State | Marietta, Georgia |
| PG | 13 | Sam Malone (injured) | 5 ft 11 in (1.8 m) | 190 lb (86 kg) | Fr | Scituate | Scituate, Massachusetts |
| SF | 14 | Michael Kidd-Gilchrist | 6 ft 7 in (2.01 m) | 232 lb (105 kg) | Fr | St. Patrick | Somerdale, New Jersey |
| SG | 20 | Doron Lamb | 6 ft 4 in (1.93 m) | 210 lb (95 kg) | So | Oak Hill Academy | Queens, New York |
| C | 23 | Anthony Davis | 6 ft 10 in (2.08 m) | 220 lb (100 kg) | Fr | Perspectives Charter | Chicago, Illinois |
| PG | 25 | Marquis Teague | 6 ft 2 in (1.88 m) | 189 lb (86 kg) | Fr | Pike | Indianapolis, Indiana |
| C | 30 | Eloy Vargas | 6 ft 11 in (2.11 m) | 244 lb (111 kg) | Sr | Miami-Dade College | Moca, D.R. |
| PG | 32 | Brian Long | 5 ft 9 in (1.75 m) | 150 lb (68 kg) | Fr | River Dell | Dumont, New Jersey |
| PF | 33 | Kyle Wiltjer | 6 ft 9 in (2.06 m) | 239 lb (108 kg) | Fr | Jesuit | Portland, Oregon |

Head coach

- John Calipari (Clarion)

Assistant coach(es)

- John Robic (Denison)
- Orlando Antigua (Pittsburgh)
- Kenny Payne (Louisville)

Legend

- (C) Team captain
- (S) Suspended
- (I) Ineligible
- (W) Walk-on
- Injured
- Current redshirt

- Jon Hood and Ryan Harrow redshirted this season—Hood due to a torn ACL, and Harrow as a transfer from North Carolina State. Both were eligible for the 2012–13 college basketball season.
- Sam Malone missed much of the season to a torn ACL.

=== Depth chart ===
| Pos. | Starting 5 | Bench 1 | Bench 2 |
|---|---|---|---|
| C | Anthony Davis | Eloy Vargas |
| PF | Terrence Jones | Kyle Wiltjer |
| SF | Michael Kidd-Gilchrist | Darius Miller | Twany Beckham |
| SG | Doron Lamb | | Brian Long |
| PG | Marquis Teague | Sam Malone | Jarrod Polson |

== Schedule and results ==
| Date time, TV | Rank^{#} | Opponent^{#} | Result | Record | High points | High rebounds | High assists | Site (attendance) city, state |
Exhibition
| Nov. 2, 2011*; 7:00, UK IMG/FSN | No. 2 | Transylvania | W 97–53 | | 22 – Jones | 12 – Jones | 9 – Teague | Rupp Arena (21,024); Lexington, Kentucky |
| Nov. 7, 2011*; 7:00, UK IMG/FSN | No. 2 | Morehouse | W 125–40 | | 26 – Wiltjer | 12 – Vargas | 7 – Teague | Rupp Arena (20,194); Lexington, Kentucky |
Regular Season
| Nov. 11, 2011*; 7:00, UK IMG/FSN | No. 2 | Marist; Hall of Fame Tip Off | W 108–58 | 1–0 | 23 – Davis | 10 – Davis | 8 – Lamb | Rupp Arena (22,079); Lexington, Kentucky |
| Nov. 15, 2011*; 9:00, ESPN | No. 2 | vs. No. 12 Kansas; Champions Classic | W 75–65 | 2–0 | 16 – Lamb | 7 – Tied | 4 – Tied | Madison Square Garden (19,979); New York, NY |
| Nov. 19, 2011*; 12:00, ESPN3 | No. 2 | vs. Penn State; Hall of Fame Tip Off | W 85–47 | 3–0 | 26 – Lamb | 9 – Jones | 4 – Tied | Mohegan Sun Arena (4,755); Uncasville, Connecticut |
| Nov. 20, 2011*; 12:00, ESPNU | No. 2 | vs. Old Dominion; Hall of Fame Tip Off | W 62–52 | 4–0 | 13 – Tied | 9 – Tied | 5 – Miller | Mohegan Sun Arena (4,128); Uncasville, Connecticut |
| Nov. 23, 2011*; 7:00, UK IMG/FSN | No. 2 | Radford | W 88–40 | 5–0 | 17 – Jones | 8 – Jones | 5 – Teague | Rupp Arena (21,302); Lexington, Kentucky |
| Nov. 26, 2011*; 7:00, UK IMG/FSN | No. 2 | Portland | W 87–63 | 6–0 | 19 – Tied | 12 – Davis | 8 – Teague | Rupp Arena (24,179); Lexington, Kentucky |
| Dec. 1, 2011*; 7:00, ESPN2 | No. 1 | St. John's; SEC–Big East Challenge | W 81–59 | 7–0 | 26 – Jones | 15 – Davis | 6 – Miller | Rupp Arena (24,119); Lexington, Kentucky |
| Dec. 3, 2011*; 12:00, CBS | No. 1 | No. 5 North Carolina | W 73–72 | 8–0 | 17 – Kidd-Gilchrist | 11 – Kidd-Gilchrist | 4 – Teague | Rupp Arena (24,398); Lexington, Kentucky |
| Dec. 10, 2011*; 5:15, ESPN | No. 1 | at Indiana; Rivalry | L 72–73 | 8–1 | 19 – Lamb | 13 – Kidd-Gilchrist | 5 – Teague | Assembly Hall (17,472); Bloomington, Indiana |
| Dec. 17, 2011*; 8:00, CSS | No. 3 | Chattanooga | W 87–62 | 9–1 | 24 – Lamb | 18 – Davis | 8 – Teague | Rupp Arena (23,211); Lexington, Kentucky |
| Dec. 20, 2011*; 7:00, ESPN2 | No. 3 | Samford | W 82–50 | 10–1 | 26 – Lamb | 9 – Davis | 5 – Tied | Rupp Arena (21,984); Lexington, Kentucky |
| Dec. 22, 2011*; 1:00, FSN | No. 3 | Loyola (MD) | W 87–63 | 11–1 | 24 – Wiltjer | 11 – Davis | 4 – Kidd-Gilchrist | Rupp Arena (22,774); Lexington, Kentucky |
| Dec. 28, 2011*; 8:30, ESPNU | No. 3 | Lamar | W 86–64 | 12–1 | 18 – Kidd-Gilchrist | 13 – Davis | 4 – Tied | Rupp Arena (24,230); Lexington, Kentucky |
| Dec. 31, 2011*; 12:00, CBS | No. 3 | No. 4 Louisville; Battle for the Bluegrass | W 69–62 | 13–1 | 24 – Kidd-Gilchrist | 19 – Kidd-Gilchrist | 5 – Teague | Rupp Arena (24,387); Lexington, Kentucky |
| Jan. 3, 2012*; 7:00, UK IMG/FSN | No. 2 | Arkansas-Little Rock | W 73–51 | 14–1 | 22 – Davis | 16 – Davis | 5 – Teague | Freedom Hall (14,747); Louisville, Kentucky |
| Jan. 7, 2012; 4:00, SECN | No. 2 | South Carolina | W 79–64 | 15–1 (1–0) | 20 – Jones | 10 – Davis | 4 – Tied | Rupp Arena (24,219); Lexington, Kentucky |
| Jan. 11, 2012; 8:00, SECN | No. 2 | at Auburn | W 68–53 | 16–1 (2–0) | 14 – Tied | 6 – Davis | 3 – Tied | Auburn Arena (9,121); Auburn, AL |
| Jan. 14, 2012; 12:00, ESPN | No. 2 | at Tennessee | W 65–62 | 17–1 (3–0) | 18 – Davis | 12 – Kidd-Gilchrist | 2 – Tied | Thompson–Boling Arena (21,678); Knoxville, Tennessee |
| Jan. 17, 2012; 9:00, ESPN | No. 2 | Arkansas; Super Tuesday | W 86–63 | 18–1 (4–0) | 27 – Davis | 15 – Davis | 9 – Teague | Rupp Arena (24,093); Lexington, Kentucky |
| Jan. 21, 2012; 12:00, CBS | No. 2 | Alabama | W 77–71 | 19–1 (5–0) | 15 – Jones | 9 – Davis | 4 – Miller | Rupp Arena (24,246); Lexington, Kentucky |
| Jan. 24, 2012; 9:00, ESPN | No. 1 | at Georgia; Super Tuesday | W 57–44 | 20–1 (6–0) | 19 – Miller | 11 – Tied | 7 – Teague | Stegeman Coliseum (10,523); Athens, Georgia |
| Jan. 28, 2012; 4:00, SECN | No. 1 | at LSU | W 74–50 | 21–1 (7–0) | 27 – Jones | 10 – Davis | 4 – Tied | Maravich Assembly Center (11,631); Baton Rouge, Louisiana |
| Jan. 31, 2012; 12:00, ESPNU | No. 1 | Tennessee | W 69–44 | 22–1 (8–0) | 18 – Davis | 8 – Tied | 4 – Teague | Rupp Arena (24,359); Lexington, Kentucky |
| Feb. 4, 2012; 7:00, ESPN | No. 1 | at South Carolina | W 86–52 | 23–1 (9–0) | 22 – Davis | 8 – Davis | 4 – Tied | Colonial Life Arena (16,527); Columbia, South Carolina |
| Feb. 7, 2012; 7:00, ESPN | No. 1 | No. 8 Florida; Super Tuesday | W 78–58 | 24–1 (10–0) | 18 – Lamb | 13 – Kidd-Gilchrist | 10 – Teague | Rupp Arena (24,389); Lexington, Kentucky |
| Feb. 11, 2012; 9:00, ESPN | No. 1 | at Vanderbilt; ESPN College GameDay | W 69–63 | 25–1 (11–0) | 16 – Lamb | 9 – Jones | 8 – Teague | Memorial Gym (14,316); Nashville, Tennessee |
| Feb. 18, 2012; 4:00, SECN | No. 1 | Ole Miss | W 77–62 | 26–1 (12–0) | 16 – Lamb | 11 – Jones | 8 – Teague | Rupp Arena (24,239); Lexington, Kentucky |
| Feb. 21, 2012; 9:00, ESPN | No. 1 | at Mississippi State; Super Tuesday | W 73–64 | 27–1 (13–0) | 18 – Kidd-Gilchrist | 11 – Davis | 4 – Teague | Humphrey Coliseum (10,213); Starkville, Mississippi |
| Feb. 25, 2012; 12:00, CBS | No. 1 | Vanderbilt | W 83–74 | 28–1 (14–0) | 28 – Davis | 11 – Davis | 6 – Teague | Rupp Arena (24,388); Lexington, Kentucky |
| Mar. 1, 2012; 9:00, ESPN | No. 1 | Georgia; Senior Night | W 79–49 | 29–1 (15–0) | 17 – Miller | 8 – Tied | 4 – Teague | Rupp Arena (24,382); Lexington, Kentucky |
| Mar. 4, 2012; 12:00, CBS | No. 1 | at No. 16 Florida | W 74–59 | 30–1 (16–0) | 22 – Davis | 12 – Davis | 4 – Tied | O'Connell Center (12,113); Gainesville, Florida |
SEC Tournament
| Mar. 9, 2012; 1:00, SECN | (1) No. 1 | vs. (8) LSU; Quarterfinals | W 60–51 | 31–1 | 19 – Kidd-Gilchrist | 14 – Davis | 5 – Teague | New Orleans Arena (18,207); New Orleans |
| Mar. 10, 2012; 1:00, ABC | (1) No. 1 | vs. (4) No. 22 Florida; Semifinals | W 74–71 | 32–1 | 16 – Lamb | 12 – Davis | 5 – Teague | New Orleans Arena (18,523); New Orleans |
| Mar. 11, 2012; 1:00, ABC | (1) No. 1 | vs. (3) Vanderbilt; Championship | L 64–71 | 32–2 | 16 – Miller | 11 – Jones | 6 – Teague | New Orleans Arena (18,114); New Orleans |
NCAA tournament
| Mar. 15, 2012; 6:50, TBS | (1 S) No. 1 | vs. (16 S) WKU; First round | W 81–66 | 33–2 | 22 – Jones | 10 – Jones | 4 – Teague | KFC Yum! Center (22,131); Louisville, Kentucky |
| Mar. 17, 2012; 7:45, CBS | (1 S) No. 1 | vs. (8 S) Iowa State; Second round | W 87–71 | 34–2 | 24 – Teague | 12 – Davis | 7 – Teague | KFC Yum! Center (21,757); Louisville, Kentucky |
| Mar. 23, 2012; 9:45, CBS | (1 S) No. 1 | vs. (4 S) No. 16 Indiana; Sweet Sixteen | W 102–90 | 35–2 | 24 – Kidd-Gilchrist | 12 – Davis | 7 – Teague | Georgia Dome (24,731); Atlanta |
| Mar. 25, 2012; 2:20, CBS | (1 S) No. 1 | vs. (3 S) No. 9 Baylor; Elite Eight | W 82–70 | 36–2 | 19 – Kidd-Gilchrist | 11 – Davis | 6 – Jones | Georgia Dome (24,035); Atlanta |
| Mar. 31, 2012; 6:09, CBS | (1 S) No. 1 | vs. (4 W) No. 17 Louisville; Final Four | W 69–61 | 37–2 | 18 – Davis | 14 – Davis | 5 – Teague | Mercedes-Benz Superdome (73,361); New Orleans |
| April 2, 2012; 9:23, CBS | (1 S) No. 1 | vs. (2 MW) No. 6 Kansas; National Championship | W 67–59 | 38–2 | 22 – Lamb | 16 – Davis | 5 – Davis | Mercedes-Benz Superdome (70,913); New Orleans |
*Non-conference game. ^{#}Rankings from AP Poll. (#) Tournament seedings in parentheses. All times are in Eastern Time.

== Rankings ==
Ranking movements Legend: ██ Increase in ranking ██ Decrease in ranking
| | Week | | | | | | | | | | | | | | | | | | | |
| Poll | Pre | 1 | 2 | 3 | 4 | 5 | 6 | 7 | 8 | 9 | 10 | 11 | 12 | 13 | 14 | 15 | 16 | 17 | 18 | Final |
|---|---|---|---|---|---|---|---|---|---|---|---|---|---|---|---|---|---|---|---|---|
| AP | 2 | 2 | 2 | 1 | 1 | 3 | 3 | 3 | 2 | 2 | 2 | 1 | 1 | 1 | 1 | 1 | 1 | 1 | 1 | |
| Coaches | 2 | 2 | 2 | 1 | 1 | 3 | 3 | 3 | 2 | 2 | 2 | 1 | 1 | 1 | 1 | 1 | 1 | 1 | 1 | 1 |

== Accomplishments ==
=== Players drafted into the NBA ===
| Year | Round | Pick | Player | NBA Team |
|---|---|---|---|---|
| 2012 | 1 | 1 | Anthony Davis | New Orleans Hornets |
| 2012 | 1 | 2 | Michael Kidd-Gilchrist | Charlotte Bobcats |
| 2012 | 1 | 18 | Terrence Jones | Houston Rockets |
| 2012 | 1 | 29 | Marquis Teague | Chicago Bulls |
| 2012 | 2 | 42 | Doron Lamb | Milwaukee Bucks |
| 2012 | 2 | 46 | Darius Miller | New Orleans Hornets |

=== Overall ===
- NCAA Champions, 8th in school history
- SEC Regular Season Champions
- Hall of Fame Tip-Off Classic Champions
- 38 victories is the most in NCAA history
- 15th Final Four appearance and 2nd in two years
- 16–0 in SEC play
- 19–0 at home
- 3rd consecutive NCAA Tournament
- 344 blocks is the most in NCAA single season history
- Anthony Davis set NCAA Freshman block record with 186

=== Team highs ===
- Most Points Scored: 108 vs. Marist, 11/11
- Highest Point Differential: 50 vs. Marist, 11/11
- Most Field Goals Made: 46 vs. Marist, 11/11
- Most Three Point Field Goals Made: 15 vs Georgia, 3/1
- Most Free Throws Made: 35 vs. Indiana, 3/23
- Most Rebounds: 57 vs. Louisville, 12/31
- Most Assists: 24 vs. Marist, 11/11
- Highest Assist-to-Turnover Ratio: 5.0 vs. Portland, 11/26 (20 assists to 4 turnovers)
- Most Blocks: 18 vs. St. John's, 12/1

=== Individual highs ===
- Most Points: 28, Anthony Davis vs. Vanderbilt, 2/25
- Most Rebounds: 19, Michael Kidd-Gilchrist vs. Louisville 12/31
- Most Three-Point Field Goals Made: 5, Doron Lamb vs. Iowa State (3/17) and Darius Miller vs. Georgia (3/1)
- Most Assists: 10, Marquis Teague vs. Florida, 2/7
- Most Steals: 4, Anthony Davis vs. Alabama, 1/21
- Most Blocks: 9, Anthony Davis vs. South Carolina, 2/4

=== Individual awards ===
- 2012 National Player of the Year: Anthony Davis (AP, Naismith, Robertson, Rupp, TSN, Wooden)
- 2012 SEC Player of the Year: Anthony Davis
- 2012 Consensus All-Americans: Anthony Davis (First Team), Michael Kidd-Gilchrist (Second Team)
- 2012 NCAA Tournament Most Outstanding Player: Anthony Davis
- 2012 All-SEC: Anthony Davis (First Team), Michael Kidd-Gilchrist (First Team), Terrence Jones (Second Team), Doron Lamb (Second Team)
- 2012 National Defensive Player of the Year: Anthony Davis (Driesell, NABC)
- 2012 Pete Newell Big Man Award: Anthony Davis
- 2012 SEC Freshman of the Year: Anthony Davis
