= Jamari Traylor =

American basketball player (born 1992)

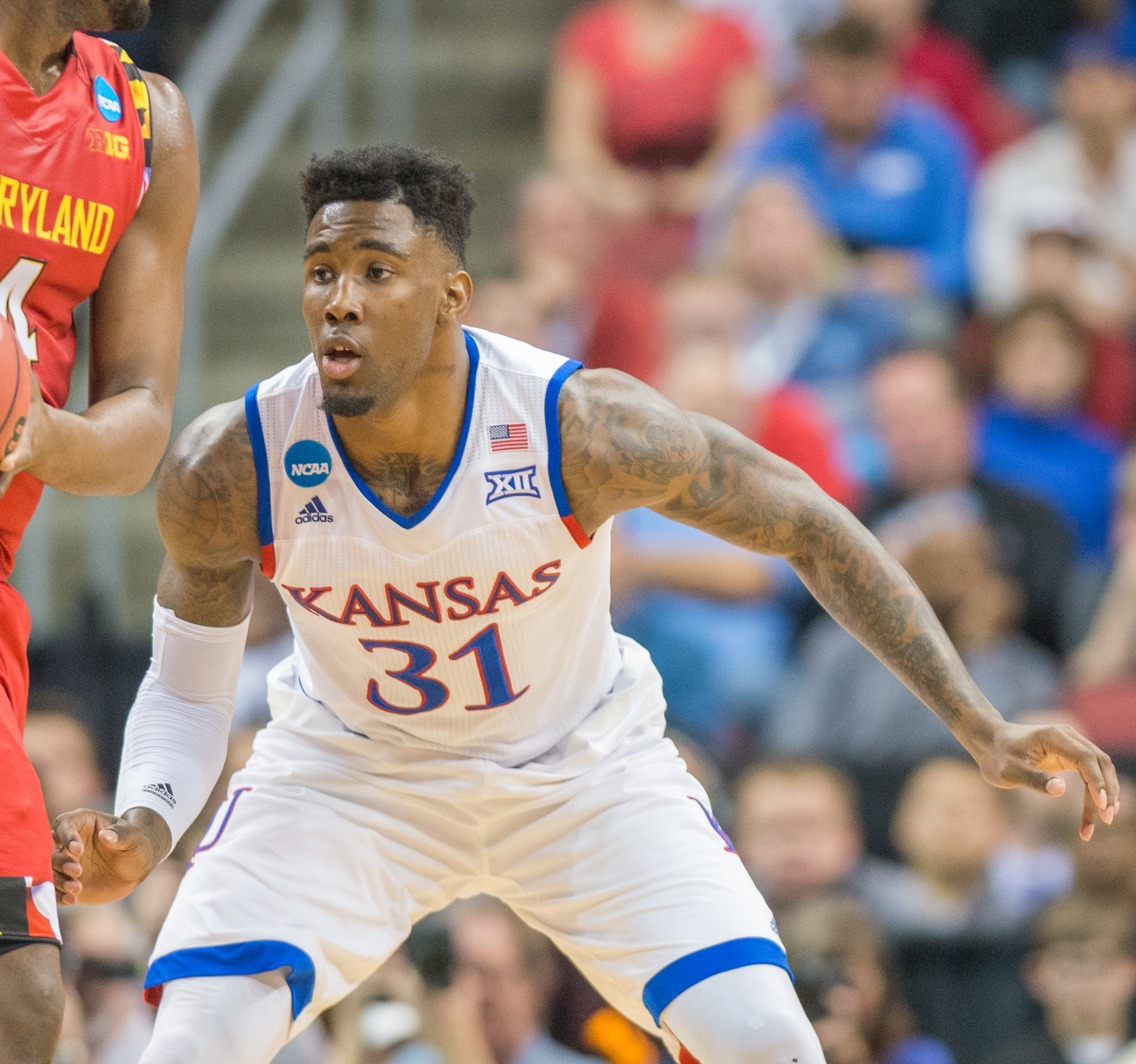
- Traylor with Kansas in college

No. 7 – Keçiören Belediyesi Bağlumspor
- Position: Power forward / center
- League: TBL

Personal information
- Born: June 24, 1992 (age 34) Chicago, Illinois, U.S.
- Listed height: 6 ft 8 in (2.03 m)
- Listed weight: 220 lb (100 kg)

Career information
- High school: IMG Academy (Bradenton, Florida)
- College: Kansas (2012–2016)
- NBA draft: 2016: undrafted
- Playing career: 2016–present

Career history
- 2016–2017: Oberwart Gunners
- 2017: Kymis
- 2018–2021: Hiroshima Dragonflies
- 2022: Oklahoma City Blue
- 2023: Boca Juniors
- 2023–2024: Best Balıkesir
- 2024–2026: Çayırova Belediyespor
- 2026: Göztepe
- 2026–present: Keçiören Belediyesi Bağlumspor

Career highlights
- Austrian League Top Rebounder (2017); Austrian League blocks leader (2017)
Medals
Men's basketball
Representing United States
Summer Universiade
Gold medal – first place	2015 Gwangju	Team competition

Jamari Traylor (born June 24, 1992) is an American professional basketball player for Keçiören Belediyesi Bağlumspor of the Türkiye Basketbol Ligi (TBL). He played college basketball for the Kansas Jayhawks. Standing at 6 ft 8 in (2.03 m), Traylor plays the power forward and center positions.

== High school career ==
Traylor played high school basketball at IMG Academy.

== College career ==
As a freshman Traylor played 37 games, producing 2 points and 2 rebounds per game with a total of 28 blocks. As a sophomore Traylor played in 34 contests, and improved his numbers, averaging 4.8 points, 4.1 rebounds and 0.8 blocks per game, improving his playing time to 16.1 minutes per game. During the next two years, his numbers continued to drop. He became known for being a hard-nosed defender and hustle type player.

== Professional career ==
After going undrafted in the 2016 NBA draft, Traylor joined Oberwart Gunners of the Austria League. During the season, Traylor was the top rebounder and led the league in blocks.

On June 22, 2017, Traylor joined Kymis of the Greek Basket League. He joined the Hiroshima Dragonflies in 2018.

On January 8, 2022, Traylor was acquired off waivers by the Oklahoma City Blue. He was then later waived on January 18, 2022.

On August 11, 2024, he signed with Çayırova Belediye of the Türkiye Basketbol Ligi (TBL). He renewed his contract with the team on July 2, 2025, signing a new one-year deal.
