= Marquis Teague =

American basketball player (born 1993)

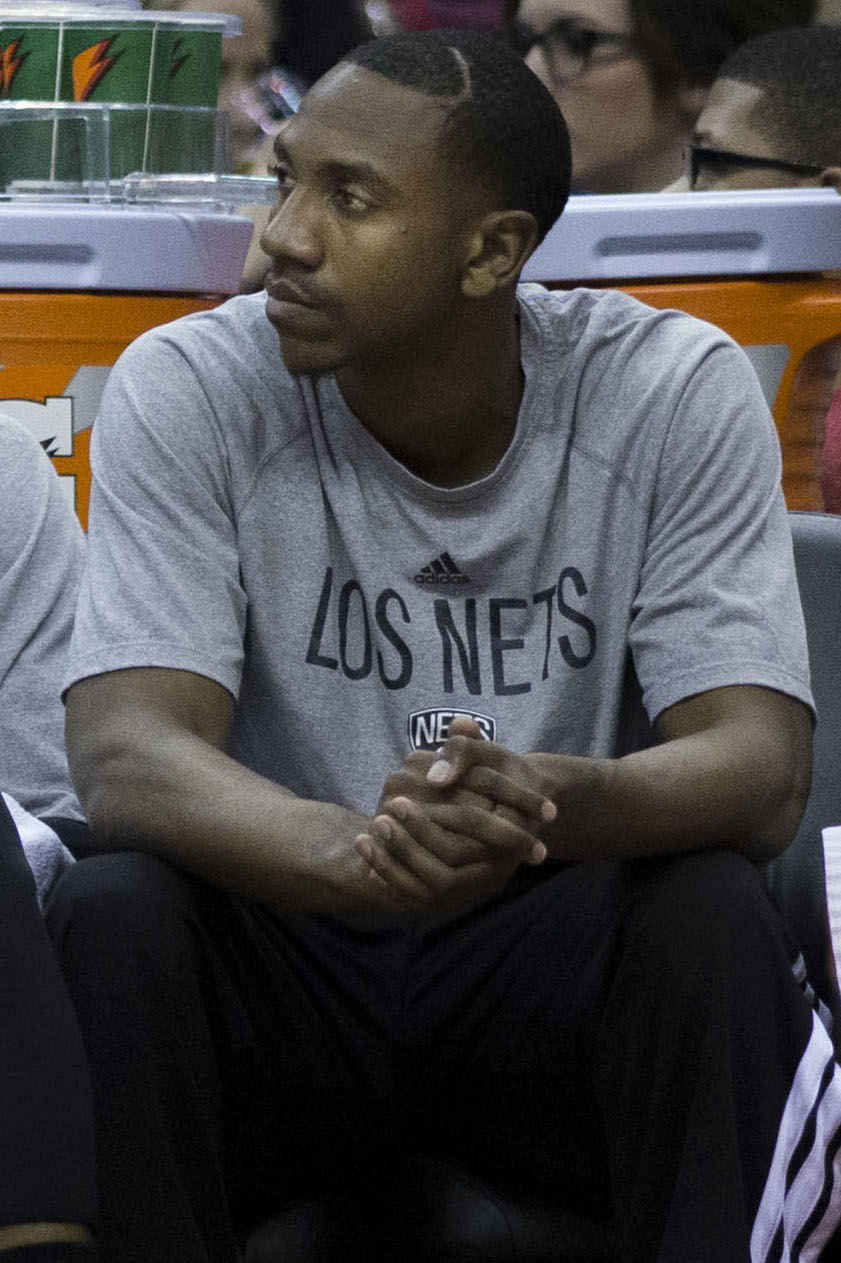
- Teague with the Brooklyn Nets in 2014

Personal information
- Born: February 28, 1993 (age 33) Indianapolis, Indiana, U.S.
- Listed height: 6 ft 2 in (1.88 m)
- Listed weight: 180 lb (82 kg)

Career information
- High school: Pike (Indianapolis, Indiana)
- College: Kentucky (2011–2012)
- NBA draft: 2012: 1st round, 29th overall pick
- Drafted by: Chicago Bulls
- Playing career: 2012–2023
- Position: Point guard
- Number: 25, 12, 10, 3

Career history
- 2012–2014: Chicago Bulls
- 2013–2014: →Iowa Energy
- 2014: Brooklyn Nets
- 2014–2016: Oklahoma City Blue
- 2016: Ironi Nahariya
- 2016–2017: Avtodor Saratov
- 2017: Fort Wayne Mad Ants
- 2017–2018: Memphis Hustle
- 2018: Memphis Grizzlies
- 2018–2019: Jeonju KCC Egis
- 2019–2020: Memphis Hustle
- 2021–2022: London Lions
- 2022–2023: Kolossos Rodou

Career highlights
- NCAA champion (2012); McDonald's All-American (2011); 2× Fourth-team Parade All-American (2010, 2011)
- Stats at NBA.com
- Stats at Basketball Reference
Medals
Men's basketball
Representing the United States
FIBA World U17 Championship
Gold medal – first place	2010 Hamburg	National team

Marquis Devante Teague (born February 28, 1993) is an American former professional basketball player. He was one of the top-rated high school basketball players in the class of 2011.

== High school career ==
In July 2010, Teague, along with future Kentucky teammate Michael Kidd-Gilchrist, were a part of the gold medal-winning team in the FIBA U-17 World Championships in Hamburg, Germany.

Considered a five-star recruit by Rivals.com, Teague was listed as the No. 1 point guard and the No. 5 player in the nation in 2011. He was a part of the Indiana versus Kentucky All-stars game.

== College career ==
Teague committed to Kentucky on April 22, 2010.

In the first game of the 2011–12 season and his career as a Wildcat, Teague started and scored 16 points on 7-of-12 shooting. One of Teague's best performances of the season came against Portland, a game where he scored 14 points, had a career high of eight assists, and a career high of 4 steals, all while committing no turnovers and shooting 5 of 6 from the free throw line. Against Louisville, Teague scored just 4 points on 1 of 8 shooting, but did dish out 5 assists and played good defense on Louisville point guard Peyton Siva, who shot 2 of 13 from the field. Teague helped Kentucky win their eighth national championship.

=== College statistics ===
Year	Team	GP	GS	MPG	FG%	3P%	FT%	RPG	APG	SPG	BPG	PPG
2011–12	Kentucky	40	40	32.6	.415	.325	.714	2.5	4.9	0.9	0.2	10.0
Career		40	40	32.6	.415	.325	.714	2.5	4.9	0.9	0.2	10.0

== Professional career ==
In April 2012, Teague declared for the 2012 NBA draft. He was selected by the Chicago Bulls with the 29th overall pick.

On December 3, 2013, Teague was assigned to the Iowa Energy; he was recalled the next day. On December 26, 2013, he was reassigned to the Energy. On January 15, 2014, he was recalled.

On January 21, 2014, Teague was traded to the Brooklyn Nets in exchange for Tornike Shengelia.

On October 24, 2014, Teague was traded, along with a 2019 second-round pick, to the Philadelphia 76ers in exchange for Casper Ware. Three days later, he was waived by the 76ers. On November 1, 2014, he was selected by the Oklahoma City Blue with the ninth overall pick in the 2014 NBA Development League draft.

On November 3, 2015, Teague was reacquired by the Blue. Teague played for the OKC Blue of the NBDL in the 2015–16 season. He averaged 15.2 points a game, 30.8 minutes a game, 5.7 field goals made, 14.2 for the field goals attempted, .726 free throw percentage, 0.9 threes a game, 2.5 threes attempted, 34% three-point accuracy, 3 free throws made, 0.4 offensive rebounds, 2.5 rebounds, 5.7 assists, 0.8 in steals a game, 0.3 blocks, 3 turnovers a game.

On July 17, 2016, Teague signed with Ironi Nahariya of the Israeli League. On October 31, he was waived by Nahariya and on November 26, he signed in Russia with Avtodor Saratov of the VTB United League. On March 2, 2017, Teague was acquired by the Fort Wayne Mad Ants of the NBA Development League.

On August 23, 2017, Teague was selected by the Memphis Hustle in the NBA G League expansion draft.

On August 30, 2018, Teague signed with Jeonju KCC Egis of the Korean league. He joined the Memphis Hustle in 2019. Teague averaged 13.2 points and 4.3 assists per game in 2019–20 season.

Teague spent the 2021–22 season with the British club London Lions, averaging 14.7 points, 2.4 rebounds, 4.6 assists and 1.2 steals in 13 games.

On September 28, 2022, Teague signed with Greek club Kolossos Rodou. In 19 league games, he averaged 4.3 points, 1.3 rebounds and 1.7 assists, playing around 16 minutes per contest.

== NBA career statistics ==
Legend
GP	Games played	GS	Games started	MPG	Minutes per game
FG%	Field goal percentage	3P%	3-point field goal percentage	FT%	Free throw percentage
RPG	Rebounds per game	APG	Assists per game	SPG	Steals per game
BPG	Blocks per game	PPG	Points per game	**Bold**	Career high

=== Regular season ===
Year	Team	GP	GS	MPG	FG%	3P%	FT%	RPG	APG	SPG	BPG	PPG
2012–13	Chicago	**48**	0	8.2	.381	.174	.563	0.9	1.3	0.2	0.1	2.1
2013–14	Chicago	19	**2**	12.7	.242	.200	.688	1.0	1.5	0.1	**0.2**	2.4
2013–14	Brooklyn	21	1	9.6	**.415**	**.375**	**.789**	1.0	1.4	0.4	0.0	3.0
2017–18	Memphis	3	0	**24.7**	.250	.250	.400	**2.0**	**4.3**	**1.3**	0.0	**3.7**
Career		91	3	10.0	.343	.222	.661	1.0	1.5	0.3	0.1	2.4

=== Playoffs ===
Year	Team	GP	GS	MPG	FG%	3P%	FT%	RPG	APG	SPG	BPG	PPG
2013	Chicago	8	0	9.0	.294	.000	.000	0.4	1.5	0.3	0.1	1.3
Career		8	0	9.0	.294	.000	.000	0.4	1.5	0.3	0.1	1.3

== Personal life ==
Teague is the son of Shawn and Carol Teague. He has four siblings, including NBA All-Star Jeff Teague. Shawn played for Norm Stewart at the University of Missouri before transferring to Boston University, where he finished his career playing for Rick Pitino; he, like his brother, was an Indiana All-Star following his senior season of high school basketball.
