= Michael Kidd-Gilchrist =

American basketball player (born 1993)

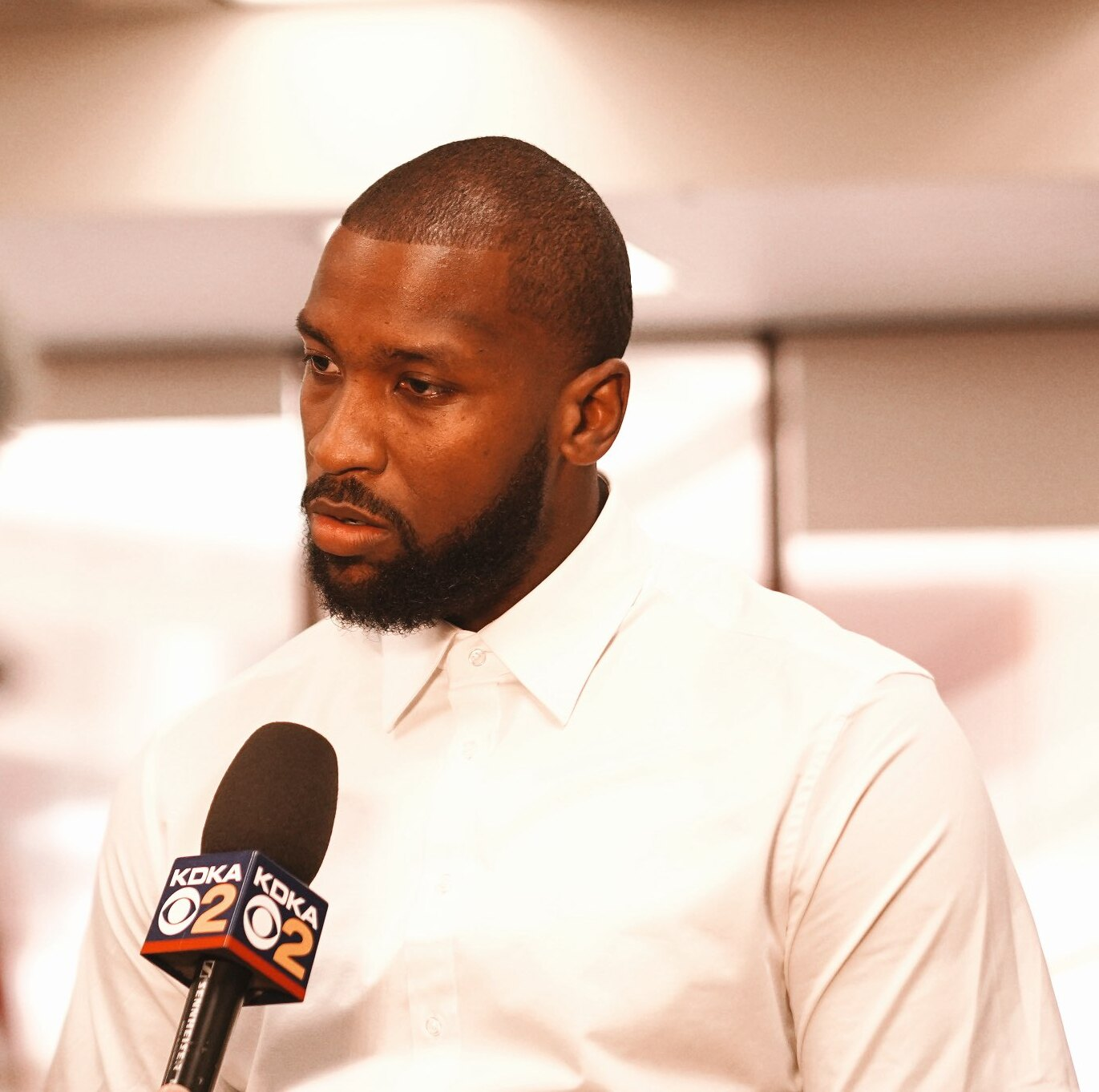
- Kidd-Gilchrist in 2024

Personal information
- Born: September 26, 1993 (age 33) Philadelphia, Pennsylvania, U.S.
- Listed height: 6 ft 6 in (1.98 m)
- Listed weight: 232 lb (105 kg)

Career information
- High school: St. Patrick (Elizabeth, New Jersey)
- College: Kentucky (2011–2012)
- NBA draft: 2012: 1st round, 2nd overall pick
- Drafted by: Charlotte Bobcats
- Playing career: 2012–2020
- Position: Small forward / power forward
- Number: 14, 9

Career history
- 2012–2020: Charlotte Bobcats / Hornets
- 2020: Dallas Mavericks

Career highlights
- NBA All-Rookie Second Team (2013); NCAA champion (2012); Consensus second-team All-American (2012); First-team All-SEC (2012); Mr. Basketball USA (2011); McDonald's All-American Game Co-MVP (2011); Second-team Parade All-American (2010); Fourth-team Parade All-American (2011)
- Stats at NBA.com
- Stats at Basketball Reference
Medals
Men's basketball
Representing United States
FIBA World U17 Championship
Gold medal – first place	2010 Hamburg	Team

Michael Anthony Edward Kidd-Gilchrist Jr. (né Gilchrist; born September 26, 1993) is an American former professional basketball player. Kidd-Gilchrist was drafted second overall by the Charlotte Bobcats in the 2012 NBA draft. He played for the University of Kentucky men's basketball team from 2011 to 2012.

== High school career ==
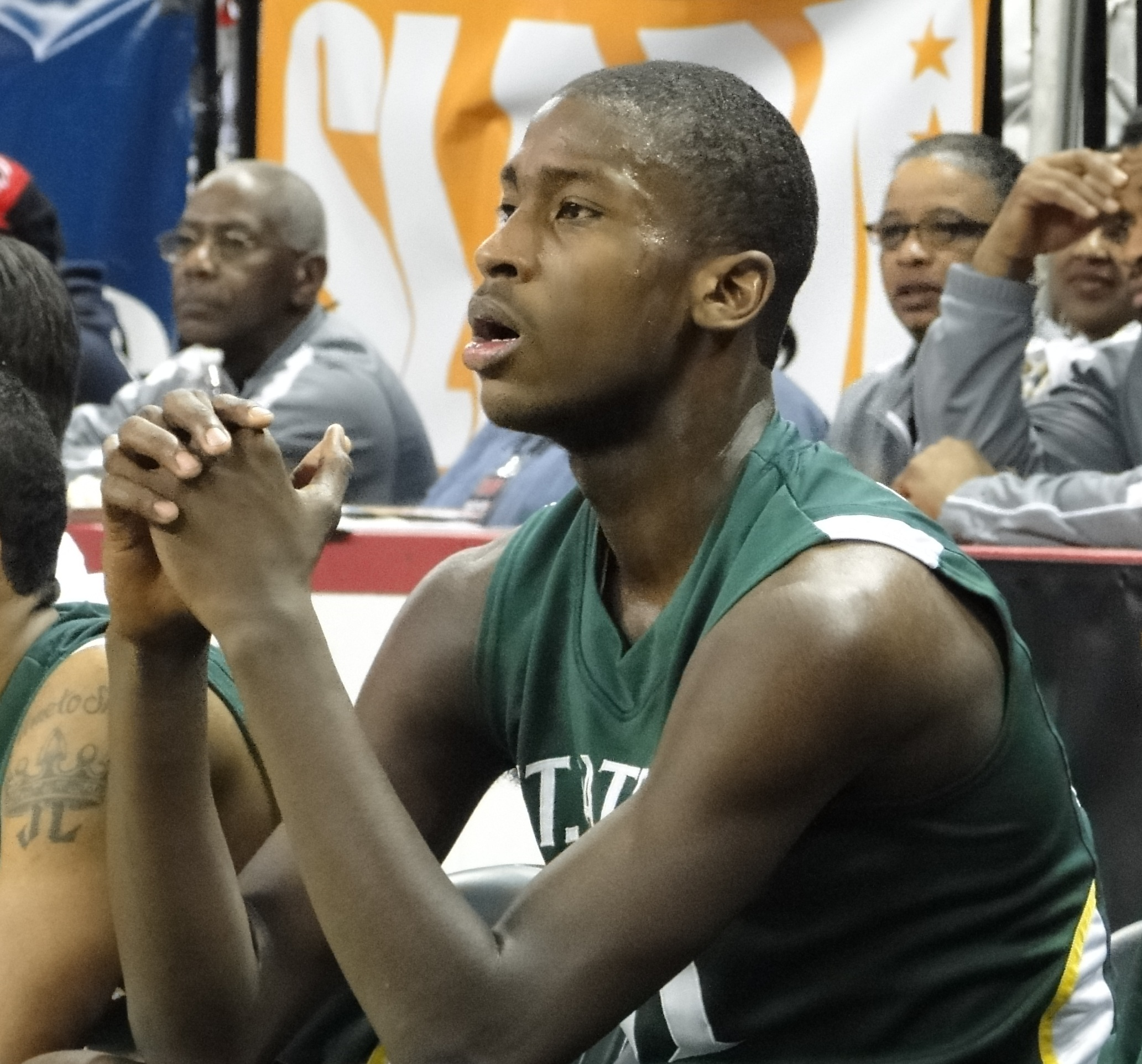
Kidd-Gilchrist during a high school game in 2010

Kidd-Gilchrist was born in Philadelphia, Pennsylvania, and grew up in Somerdale, New Jersey. He was raised by his mother, Cindy Richardson, and his stepfather, Vincent Richardson, after Kidd-Gilchrist's father died before Michael's third birthday. While attending basketball powerhouse St. Patrick High School in Elizabeth, New Jersey (where he played with Kyrie Irving), he was considered one of the best basketball players in the United States. He was ranked as the #3 player by ESPN.com, and Rivals.com; while Scout.com ranked him as the #1 player at his position. In July 2010, Gilchrist, along with future Kentucky teammate Marquis Teague, were a part of the gold medal-winning team in the FIBA U-17 World Championships in Hamburg, Germany. Gilchrist's senior year at St. Patrick High School was a pivotal storyline in the HBO documentary Prayer for a Perfect Season.

=== High school awards and honors ===
- McDonald's All-American Game Co-MVP (2011)
- Mr. Basketball USA (2011)
- USA Today All-USA First Team (2011)
- Parade All-American Fourth Team (2011)
- USA Today All-USA Second Team (2010)
- Parade All-American Second Team (2010)

== College career ==
Kidd-Gilchrist committed to attend the University of Kentucky on April 14, 2010.

In the first game of the 2011–12 season and his career as a Wildcat, Kidd-Gilchrist was a starter and scored 15 points on 5-of-9 shooting against Marist. In his second game against 11th-ranked Kansas, he scored 12 points and pulled down nine rebounds in a 75–65 victory at Madison Square Garden. In a rivalry game against 5th-ranked North Carolina at Rupp Arena, Kidd-Gilchrist led Kentucky in scoring with 17 points and had 11 rebounds, giving him his first double-double as a Wildcat. Against 4th-ranked Louisville, he turned in his most dominating performance of the season with 24 points and 19 rebounds, shooting a career-high 13 free throws and having his first zero-turnover game at Kentucky. This was enough to lead Kentucky to a 69–62 victory in Lexington.

=== College awards and honors ===
- NCAA champion (2012)
- Consensus second team All-American (2012)
- First team All-SEC (2012)
- All-SEC Freshman team (2012)
- All-SEC Defensive team (2012)
- NCAA Final Four All-Tournament Team (2012)

== Professional career ==
=== Charlotte Bobcats / Hornets (2012–2020) ===
==== All-Rookie honors (2012–2013) ====
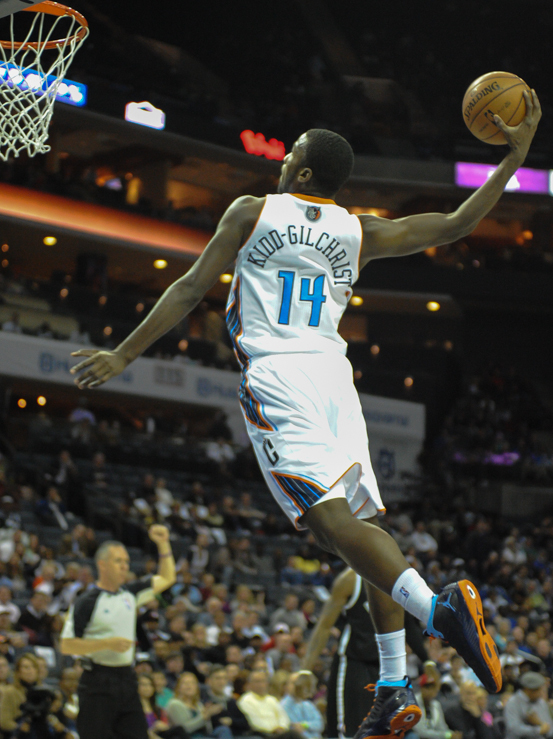
Kidd-Gilchrist goes up for a dunk in 2013

In April 2012, Kidd-Gilchrist declared for the 2012 NBA draft. On June 28, he was drafted second overall by the Charlotte Bobcats. On July 7, 2012, the Bobcats signed Kidd-Gilchrist to a rookie scale contract.

On November 10, 2012, in just his fifth NBA game, Kidd-Gilchrist had 25 points and 12 rebounds in a 101–97 win over the Dallas Mavericks, marking Charlotte's first-ever win over Dallas in the franchise's nine-year history, ending a 16-game losing streak against the Mavericks. He had a second 25-point, 12-rebound effort on December 19, 2012, against the Phoenix Suns. He became only the second player in NBA history to post two games with at least 25 points and at least 12 rebounds before his 20th birthday and became just the fourth player in 20 years to record two such games in the first 25 games of his career. On April 5, 2013, he had a season-high 14 rebounds against the Miami Heat. On May 14, 2013, he was named to the NBA All-Rookie Second Team.

==== Leg injuries (2013–2015) ====
In 2013–14, Kidd-Gilchrist missed 19 games mid-season due to injury. He scored a season-high 16 points three times, all in November, and had a season-high 12 rebounds twice during the second half of the season.

Over the 2014 offseason, Kidd-Gilchrist worked with Hornets' assistant coach Mark Price to help re-develop his jump shot.

Kidd-Gilchrist's 2014–15 season started slow as he missed 14 of Charlotte's first 20 games because of rib and foot injuries. During this stretch, the Hornets were just 3–11 without Kidd-Gilchrist on the court, who returned on December 10 against the Boston Celtics. Kidd-Gilchrist's best play came in January when he averaged 11.4 points and 9.4 rebounds leading the way for a Hornets team that went 10–4 during the month. He scored in double figures ten times in January, and also recorded five double-doubles, which was just one shy of matching his career best for an entire season. He later missed a pair of games right before the All-Star Break with a hamstring strain and sat out Charlotte's final 11 games because of a sprained left ankle he suffered against the Washington Wizards on March 27. Despite a career-low 55 games, Kidd-Gilchrist averaged personal bests in points (10.9) and rebounds (7.6).

==== Injury-plagued season and career-highs (2015–2017) ====
On August 26, 2015, Kidd-Gilchrist signed a four-year, $52 million contract extension with the Hornets. On October 3, 2015, he suffered a separated right shoulder in a preseason contest against the Orlando Magic. He subsequently missed four months of action, making his season debut on January 29, 2016, against the Portland Trail Blazers. On February 11, he was deemed unlikely to play again in 2015–16 due to another right shoulder injury. He was ruled out for the rest of the season five days later after his torn labrum required another round of surgery.

In the Hornets' season opener on October 26, 2016, Kidd-Gilchrist recorded 23 points and 14 rebounds in a 107–96 win over the Milwaukee Bucks. Both were season-high marks. On the year, Kidd-Gilchrist finished with 9.2 points on 47.7 percent shooting, a team-high 7.0 rebounds (1.9 offensive boards) and 1.4 assists to go along with career-best marks in free-throw percentage (78.4 percent), steals (1.0), blocks (1.0) and turnovers (0.7). He was one of just 13 players in the league to start at least 81 games, marking the third such season by a Hornets player since the conclusion of the 2012–13 season.

==== Final years in Charlotte (2017–2020) ====
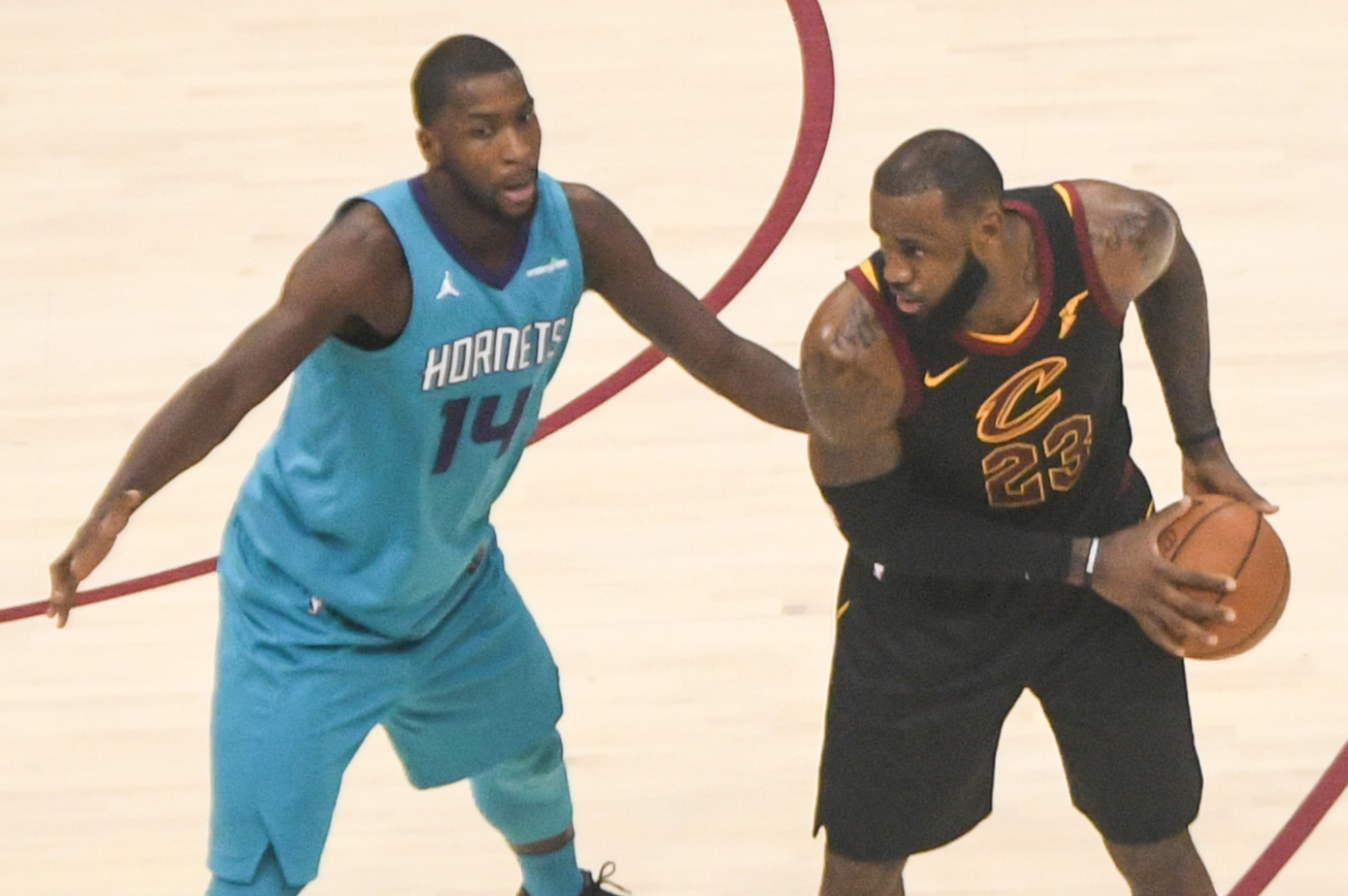
Kidd-Gilchrist defending against Cavaliers' LeBron James in 2017

Kidd-Gilchrist made his season debut on October 25, 2017, against the Denver Nuggets after missing the first three games for personal reasons. He started and played 10:37, scoring two points on 1-of-6 shooting. On November 15, 2017, he scored a season-high 22 points in a 115–107 loss to the Cleveland Cavaliers.

Kidd-Gilchrist missed six games in November 2018 with an ankle injury. He later missed a handful of games in March 2019. Having started all but four of 357 career games for the Hornets heading into the season, Kidd-Gilchrist came off the bench for 61 of his 64 contests in 2018–19. He subsequently averaged 6.7 points and 3.8 rebounds in a career-low 18.4 minutes per contest.

In June 2019, Kidd-Gilchrist underwent a surgical procedure to address a chronic groin strain, and picked up his $13 million player option for the 2019–20 season. On February 8, 2020, the Hornets reached a contract buyout agreement with Kidd-Gilchrist.

=== Dallas Mavericks (2020) ===
Kidd-Gilchrist joined the Dallas Mavericks on February 11, 2020. He made his debut on February 21, in a 122–106 win over the Orlando Magic.

On November 28, 2020, Kidd-Gilchrist signed with the New York Knicks. He was waived on December 19. A lawsuit Kidd-Gilchrist filed in 2023 says he was waived after he began to feel acute chest pain and had to quit playing the sport altogether. Kidd-Gilchrist says he has been diagnosed with COVID-19 related Myocarditis, and after his insurance denied coverage, he is now suing Lloyd's of London for $40 million.

== Career statistics ==
Legend
GP	Games played	GS	Games started	MPG	Minutes per game
FG%	Field goal percentage	3P%	3-point field goal percentage	FT%	Free throw percentage
RPG	Rebounds per game	APG	Assists per game	SPG	Steals per game
BPG	Blocks per game	PPG	Points per game	**Bold**	Career high

=== NBA ===
==== Regular season ====
Year	Team	GP	GS	MPG	FG%	3P%	FT%	RPG	APG	SPG	BPG	PPG
2012–13	Charlotte	78	77	26.0	.458	.222	.749	5.8	**1.5**	.7	.9	9.0
2013–14	Charlotte	62	62	24.2	.473	.111	.614	5.2	.8	.7	.6	7.2
2014–15	Charlotte	55	52	28.9	.465	—	.701	**7.6**	1.4	.5	.7	10.9
2015–16	Charlotte	7	7	**29.3**	**.541**	**.429**	.690	6.4	1.3	.4	.4	**12.7**
2016–17	Charlotte	**81**	**81**	29.0	.477	.111	.784	7.0	1.4	**1.0**	**1.0**	9.2
2017–18	Charlotte	74	74	25.0	.504	.000	.684	4.1	1.0	.7	.4	9.2
2018–19	Charlotte	64	3	18.4	.476	.340	.772	3.8	1.0	.5	.6	6.7
2019–20	Charlotte	12	0	13.3	.340	.294	.778	2.9	.8	.0	.3	4.0
2019–20	Dallas	13	0	9.3	.308	.000	**.800**	2.5	.3	.2	.2	.9
Career		446	356	24.6	.474	.272	.715	5.4	1.2	.7	.7	8.4

==== Playoffs ====
Year	Team	GP	GS	MPG	FG%	3P%	FT%	RPG	APG	SPG	BPG	PPG
2014	Charlotte	4	**4**	**22.8**	**.519**	.000	.600	**6.5**	**1.5**	.0	**.5**	**8.5**
2020	Dallas	**6**	0	9.2	.286	**.222**	**.667**	1.0	.5	**.2**	.2	2.3
Career		10	4	14.6	.439	.200	.625	3.2	.9	.1	.3	4.8

=== College ===
Year	Team	GP	GS	MPG	FG%	3P%	FT%	RPG	APG	SPG	BPG	PPG
2011–12	Kentucky	40	39	31.1	.491	.255	.745	7.4	1.9	1.0	.9	11.9

== Personal life ==
Gilchrist's father died August 11, 1996, from multiple gunshot wounds. He watches the movie The Lion King once a week because he watched it almost every day with his father until he was three years old. Gilchrist committed to Kentucky on April 14, 2010, which would have been his father's 44th birthday.

Gilchrist's father played alongside Milt Wagner on a state championship team at Camden High in 1981. Wagner's son, former NBA player Dajuan Wagner, is Gilchrist's cousin.

On July 7, 2011, Gilchrist announced via Twitter that he had legally changed his last name to Kidd-Gilchrist, in order to honor the other important man in his life, his uncle Darrin Kidd. Kidd died on the day Gilchrist was set to sign his letter of intent to play at the University of Kentucky.

Kidd-Gilchrist has a stutter. Due to this, he developed an anxiety in front of media, although he has made tremendous strides in managing this as well as his stutter.

== Activism ==
As a stutterer, Kidd-Gilchrist decided to make his mark upon the country by endeavoring to improve and empower the lives of fellow stutterers. So, in 2021, Kidd-Gilchrist founded a 501(c)(3) organization called Change & Impact, with a mission and vision of improving access to healthcare and expand services and resources for those who stutter and changing the social stigma of stuttering through awareness, education and empowerment.

One of Kidd-Gilchrist's accomplishments include passing a bill to expand healthcare access to those who stutter in Kentucky, a bipartisan effort that the Governor of Kentucky signed into law in 2024.

Kidd-Gilchrist is further working on efforts to pass similar bills in Pennsylvania and California.

In addition to the political efforts, Kidd-Gilchrist has made it a priority to travel the country on a Change & Impact Stuttering Awareness Tour to connect with colleges and universities, hospitals, camps, support groups, established and future Speech-Language Pathologists (SLPs), and children, teens and adults who stutter.

In his advocacy efforts, Kidd-Gilchrist has met with more than a dozen senators, two dozen U.S. representatives, over a hundred state representatives, and visited over 60 universities and a dozen children's hospitals.
