= 2011–12 Oklahoma State Cowboys basketball team =

American college basketball season

2011–12 Oklahoma State Cowboys basketball
- Conference: Big 12 Conference
- Record: 15–18 (7–11 Big 12)
- Head coach: Travis Ford (4th season)
- Assistant coaches: Butch Pierre; Chris Ferguson; Steve Middleton
- Home arena: Gallagher-Iba Arena

2011–12 Big 12 men's basketball standings
| | Conf. | | | | Overall |
| Team | W | | L | PCT | W | | L | PCT |
|---|---|---|---|---|---|---|---|---|
| No. 6 Kansas | 16 | – | 2 | .889 | 32 | – | 7 | .821 |
| No. 3 Missouri † | 14 | – | 4 | .778 | 30 | – | 5 | .857 |
| Iowa State | 12 | – | 6 | .667 | 23 | – | 11 | .676 |
| No. 9 Baylor | 12 | – | 6 | .667 | 30 | – | 8 | .789 |
| Kansas State | 10 | – | 8 | .556 | 22 | – | 11 | .667 |
| Texas | 9 | – | 9 | .500 | 20 | – | 14 | .588 |
| Oklahoma State | 7 | – | 11 | .389 | 15 | – | 18 | .455 |
| Oklahoma | 5 | – | 13 | .278 | 15 | – | 16 | .484 |
| Texas A&M | 4 | – | 14 | .222 | 14 | – | 18 | .438 |
| Texas Tech | 1 | – | 17 | .056 | 8 | – | 23 | .258 |
† 2012 Big 12 Tournament winner Rankings from AP poll

The 2011–12 Oklahoma State Cowboys basketball team represented Oklahoma State University in the 2011–12 NCAA Division I men's basketball season. This was head coach Travis Ford's fourth season at Oklahoma State. The Cowboys competed in the Big 12 Conference and played their home games at the Gallagher-Iba Arena. They finished the season 15-18, 7-11 in Big 12 play to finish in seventh place. They advanced to the quarterfinals of the Big 12 tournament, where they lost to Missouri. They did not receive an at-large invitation to the 2012 NCAA tournament.

== Pre-season ==
=== Departures ===
| Name | Number | Pos. | Height | Weight | Year | Hometown | Notes |
|---|---|---|---|---|---|---|---|
| Jarred Shaw | 5 | F | 6'10" | 235 | Sophomore | Dallas, Texas | Transferred- Utah State |
| Ray Penn | 14 | G | 5'9" | 160 | Sophomore | Houston, Texas | Transferred- Texas Southern |
| Nick Sidorakis | 15 | G | 6'4" | 195 | Senior | Jenks, Oklahoma | Graduated |
| Darrell Williams | 25 | F | 6'8" | 245 | Junior | Chicago, Illinois | Transferred- Texas A&M-Commerce |
| Matt Pilgram | 31 | F | 6'8" | 255 | Senior | Cincinnati, Ohio | Graduated |
| Roger Franklin | 32 | G | 6'5" | 220 | Sophomore | Duncanville, Texas | Transferred- North Texas |
| Marshall Moses | 33 | F | 6'7" | 255 | Senior | Aiken, South Carolina | Graduated |
| Songo Adoki | 42 | F | 6'5" | 205 | Senior | Oklahoma City, Oklahoma | Graduated |

=== Recruits ===
College recruiting information
| Name | Hometown | School | Height | Weight | Commit date |
|---|---|---|---|---|---|
| Cezar Guerrero; PG | Huntington Park, CA | St. John Bosco High School | 6 ft 1 in (1.85 m) | 185 lb (84 kg) | Mar 15, 2011 |
| Cezar Guerrero; PG | Recruit ratings: Scout: Rivals: (91) | | | | |
| Philip Jurick; C | Chattanooga, TN | Chattanooga State Community College | 6 ft 11 in (2.11 m) | 260 lb (120 kg) | Apr 19, 2011 |
| Philip Jurick; C | Recruit ratings: Scout: Rivals: (JC) | | | | |
| Le'Bryan Nash; SF | Dallas, TX | Lincoln High School (Dallas) | 6 ft 7 in (2.01 m) | 235 lb (107 kg) | Oct 21, 2010 |
| Le'Bryan Nash; SF | Recruit ratings: Scout: Rivals: (97) | | | | |
Overall recruit ranking: Scout: Not Ranked Top 20 Rivals: Not Ranked Top 20 ESPN: Not Ranked Top 20
Note: In many cases, Scout, Rivals, 247Sports, On3, and ESPN may conflict in their listings of height and weight.; In these cases, the average was taken. ESPN grades are on a 100-point scale.; Sources: "Oklahoma State 2012 Basketball Commitments". Rivals.; "2011 Oklahoma State Basketball Commits". Scout.; "ESPN". ESPN.; "Scout.com Team Recruiting Rankings". Scout.; "2011 Team Ranking". Rivals.

== Roster ==
2011–12 Oklahoma State Cowboys men's basketball team
Players
Coaches

| Pos. | # | Name | Height | Weight | Year | Previous school | Hometown |
|---|---|---|---|---|---|---|---|
| G | 0 | Jean-Paul Olukemi | 6 ft 6 in (1.98 m) | 215 lb (98 kg) | Jr | Stoneridge Prep; Vincennes University | LaHabra, CA |
| G | 1 | Reger Dowell | 6 ft 1 in (1.85 m) | 183 lb (83 kg) | Jr | Duncanville | Duncanville, TX |
| G | 2 | Le'Bryan Nash | 6 ft 7 in (2.01 m) | 235 lb (107 kg) | Fr | Lincoln | Dallas, TX |
| G | 3 | Cezar Guerrero | 6 ft 1 in (1.85 m) | 185 lb (84 kg) | Fr | St. John Bosco | Huntington Park, CA |
| G | 12 | Fred Gulley | 6 ft 2 in (1.88 m) | 182 lb (83 kg) | So | Fayetteville | Fayetteville, AR |
| G | 12 | Keiton Page | 5 ft 9 in (1.75 m) | 165 lb (75 kg) | Sr | Pawnee | Pawnee, OK |
| F | 14 | Marek Soucek | 7 ft 0 in (2.13 m) | 240 lb (109 kg) | Fr | Canarias Academy | Brno, Czech Republic |
| G | 15 | Christien Sager | 6 ft 4 in (1.93 m) | 205 lb (93 kg) | Fr | Rider | Wichita Falls, TX |
| F | 20 | Michael Cobbins | 6 ft 8 in (2.03 m) | 230 lb (104 kg) | Fr | Palo Duro | Amarillo, TX |
| G | 22 | Markel Brown (C) | 6 ft 3 in (1.91 m) | 190 lb (86 kg) | So | Peabody Magnet | Alexandria, LA |
| G | 30 | Grayson George | 6 ft 2 in (1.88 m) | 180 lb (82 kg) | Fr | Minneapolis Junior-Senior High School | Minneapolis, KS |
| F | 31 | Brian Williams (C) | 6 ft 5 in (1.96 m) | 210 lb (95 kg) | Fr | Glen Oaks | Baton Rouge, LA |
| C | 44 | Philip Jurick | 6 ft 11 in (2.11 m) | 270 lb (122 kg) | Sr | East Ridge; Chattanooga State | Chattanooga, TN |
| F | 53 | Mason Cox (W) | 6 ft 10 in (2.08 m) | 230 lb (104 kg) | Jr | Marcus | Highland Village, TX |

Head coach

- Travis Ford (Kentucky)

Assistant coach(es)

- Butch Pierre (Mississippi State)
- Chris Ferguson (Cumberlands)
- Steve Middleton (Southern Illinois)

Legend

- (C) Team captain
- (S) Suspended
- (I) Ineligible
- (W) Walk-on
- Injured
- Current redshirt

== Rankings ==
Ranking movements Legend: ██ Increase in ranking ██ Decrease in ranking — = Not ranked
| | Week | | | | | | | | | | | | | | | | | | | | |
| Poll | Pre | 1 | 2 | 3 | 4 | 5 | 6 | 7 | 8 | 9 | 10 | 11 | 12 | 13 | 14 | 15 | 16 | 17 | 18 | 19 | Final |
|---|---|---|---|---|---|---|---|---|---|---|---|---|---|---|---|---|---|---|---|---|---|
| AP Poll | — | — | — | — | — | — | ZNR | — | — | — | — | — | — | — | — | — | — | — | — | — | — |
| Coaches Poll | — | — | — | — | — | — | — | — | — | — | — | — | — | — | — | — | — | — | — | — | — |

== Schedule and results ==
- All times are Central

| Date time, TV | Rank^{#} | Opponent^{#} | Result | Record | Site (attendance) city, state |
Non-conference regular season
| 11/11/2011*; 7:00 pm | | Texas A&M-Corpus Christi | W 71-39 | 1–0 | Gallagher-Iba Arena (9,377); Stillwater, OK |
| 11/15/2011* | | Arkansas-Pine Bluff; NIT Season Tip-Off First Round | W 73-46 | 2–0 | Gallagher-Iba Arena; Stillwater, OK |
| 11/16/2011*; 7:00 pm, ESPN3 | | UTSA; NIT Season Tip-Off Quarterfinals | W 90-85 ^{OT} | 3–0 | Gallagher-Iba Arena (4,211); Stillwater, OK |
| 11/23/2011*; 6:00 pm, ESPN2 | | vs. Stanford; NIT Season Tip_off Semifinals | L 67-82 | 3-1 | Madison Square Garden (8,293); New York, NY |
| 11/25/2011*; 1:30 pm, ESPN | | vs. Virginia Tech; NIT Season Tip-Off Consolation Game | L 57-59 | 3-2 | Madison Square Garden (8,447); New York, NY |
| 11/30/2011*; 7:00 pm | | Tulsa | W 59-56 | 4-2 | Gallagher-Iba Arena (9,448); Stillwater, OK |
| 12/04/2011* | | Langston | W 80-58 | 5-2 | Gallagher-Iba Arena; Stillwater, OK |
| 12/07/2011*; 8:00 pm, ESPNU | | at Missouri State | W 72-67 | 6-2 | JQH Arena (6,461); Springfield, MO |
| 12/10/2011*; 1:30 pm, ESPN2 | | vs. No. 15 Pittsburgh; Carquest Auto Parts Classic | L 68-74 | 6-3 | Madison Square Garden (17,046); New York, NY |
| 12/17/2011*; 8:00 pm, ESPN2 | | vs. New Mexico; All-College Basketball Classic | L 56-66 | 6-4 | Chesapeake Energy Arena (5,303); Oklahoma City, OK |
| 12/21/2011*; 8:00 pm, ESPN2 | | vs. Alabama | L 52-69 | 6-5 | Birmingham-Jefferson Convention Complex (13,808); Birmingham, AL |
| 12/29/2011* | | vs. SMU | W 68–58 ^{2OT} | 7-5 | American Airlines Center; Dallas, TX |
| 12/31/2011*; 11:00 am | | Virginia Tech | L 61-67 | 7-6 | Gallagher-Iba Arena (12,500); Stillwater, OK |
Big 12 Regular Season
| 01/04/2012; 7:00 pm | | No. 25 Texas Tech | W 67–59 | 8-6 (1-0) | Gallagher-Iba Arena (9,228); Stillwater, OK |
| 01/07/2013; 6:00 pm, LHN | | at Texas | L 49-58 | 8-7 (1–1) | Frank Erwin Center (12,841); Austin, TX |
| 01/09/2012; 6:00 pm, ESPNU | | Oklahoma; Bedlam Series | W 72-65 | 9-7 (2-1) | Gallagher-Iba Arena (9,478); Stillwater, OK |
| 01/14/2012; 2:00 pm, ESPN2 | | at No. 4 Baylor | L 65-106 | 9-8 (2–2) | Ferrell Center (9,594); Waco, TX |
| 01/18/2012; 8:00 pm, ESPNU | | at Iowa State | L 68-71 | 9-9 (2–3) | James H. Hilton Coliseum (12,397); Ames, IA |
| 01/21/2012; 12:30 pm, Big 12 Network | | No. 25 Kansas State | L 58-66 | 9-10 (2-4) | Gallagher-Iba Arena (10,338); Stillwater, OK |
| 01/25/2012; 6:30 pm, ESPN2 | | No. 2 Missouri | W 79-72 | 10-10 (3-4) | Gallagher-Iba Arena (9,476); Stillwater, OK |
| 01/28/2012; 3:00 pm, Big 12 Network | | at Texas A&M | L 61-76 | 10-11 (3-5) | Reed Arena (9,072); College Station, TX |
| 01/31/2012; 7:00 pm, Big 12 Network | | at Texas Tech | W 80-63 | 11-11 (4-5) | United Spirit Arena (7,408); Lubbock, TX |
| 02/04/2012; 12:45 pm, Big 12 Network | | No. 6 Baylor | L 60-64 | 11-12 (4-6) | Gallagher-Iba Arena (10,775); Stillwater, OK |
| 02/07/2012; 6:00 pm, ESPN2 | | Iowa State | W 69-67 | 12-12 (5-6) | Gallagher-Iba Arena (9,365); Stillwater, OK |
| 02/11/2012; 3:00 pm, Big 12 Network | | at No. 7 Kansas | L 66-81 | 12-13 (5-7) | Allen Fieldhouse (16,300); Lawrence, KS |
| 02/15/2012; 8:00 pm, ESPN2 | | at No. 3 Missouri | L 65-83 | 12-14 (5-8) | Mizzou Arena (14,324); Columbia, MO |
| 02/18/2012; 3:00 pm, Big 12 Network | | Texas | W 90-78 | 13-14 (6-8) | Gallagher-Iba Arena (10,438); Stillwater, OK |
| 02/22/2012; 7:00 pm, Big 12 Network | | at Oklahoma; Bedlam Series | L 64–77 | 13-15 (6-9) | Lloyd Noble Center (9,393); Norman, OK |
| 02/25/2012; 1:00 pm, ESPN2 | | Texas A&M | W 60-42 | 14-15 (7-9) | Gallagher-Iba Arena (12,190); Stillwater, OK |
| 02/27/2012; 8:00 pm, ESPN | | No. 3 Kansas | L 58-70 | 14-16 (7-10) | Gallagher-Iba Arena (10,552); Stillwater, OK |
| 03/03/2012; 12:30 pm, Big 12 Network | | at Kansas State | L 58-77 | 14-17 (7-11) | Bramlage Coliseum (12,528); Manhattan, KS |
2012 Big 12 men's basketball tournament
| 03/07/2012; 8:30 pm, Big 12 Network | (7) | vs. (10) Texas Tech; First Round | W 76-60 | 15-17 | Sprint Center (18,972); Kansas City, MO |
| 03/08/2012; 6:00 pm, Big 12 Network/ESPNU | (7) | vs. (2) No. 5 Missouri; Quarterfinals | L 70-88 | 15-18 | Sprint Center (18,972); Kansas City, MO |
*Non-conference game. ^{#}Rankings from AP Poll. (#) Tournament seedings in parentheses. All times are in Central Time..

== See also ==
- Oklahoma State Cowboys basketball (men's basketball only)
- 2011-12 Big 12 Conference men's basketball season
