= 2011–12 Iowa State Cyclones men's basketball team =

American college basketball season

2011–12 Iowa State Cyclones men's basketball

NCAA tournament, Round of 32
- Conference: Big 12 Conference
- Record: 23–11 (12–6 Big 12)
- Head coach: Fred Hoiberg (2nd season)
- Assistant coaches: T. J. Otzelberger (6th season); Matt Abdelmassih; Cornell Mann
- Home arena: Hilton Coliseum

2011–12 Big 12 men's basketball standings
| | Conf. | | | | Overall |
| Team | W | | L | PCT | W | | L | PCT |
|---|---|---|---|---|---|---|---|---|
| No. 6 Kansas | 16 | – | 2 | .889 | 32 | – | 7 | .821 |
| No. 3 Missouri † | 14 | – | 4 | .778 | 30 | – | 5 | .857 |
| Iowa State | 12 | – | 6 | .667 | 23 | – | 11 | .676 |
| No. 9 Baylor | 12 | – | 6 | .667 | 30 | – | 8 | .789 |
| Kansas State | 10 | – | 8 | .556 | 22 | – | 11 | .667 |
| Texas | 9 | – | 9 | .500 | 20 | – | 14 | .588 |
| Oklahoma State | 7 | – | 11 | .389 | 15 | – | 18 | .455 |
| Oklahoma | 5 | – | 13 | .278 | 15 | – | 16 | .484 |
| Texas A&M | 4 | – | 14 | .222 | 14 | – | 18 | .438 |
| Texas Tech | 1 | – | 17 | .056 | 8 | – | 23 | .258 |
† 2012 Big 12 Tournament winner Rankings from AP poll

The 2011–12 Iowa State Cyclones men's basketball team represented Iowa State University during the 2011–12 NCAA Division I men's basketball season. The Cyclones were coached by Fred Hoiberg, who was in his second season. They played their home games at Hilton Coliseum in Ames, Iowa and competed in the Big 12 Conference.

== Previous season ==
The Cyclones finished 16–16, and 3–13 in Big 12 play to finish tied for 12th in the regular season conference standings. They lost to Colorado in the first round of the Big 12 tournament.

=== Offseason departures ===
Offseason departures
| Name | Position | Reason for departure |
|---|---|---|
| Jake Anderson | Guard | Graduated |
| Diante Garrett | Guard | Graduated |
| Jamie Vanderbeken | Forward | Graduated |
| Drew Mitchell | Forward | Graduated |
| Eric McKnight | Forward | Transferred to Florida Gulf Coast |
| DeMarcus Phillips | Guard | Transferred to Marshalltown CC |
| John Lamb | Guard | Transferred to Dakota State |
| Calvin Godfrey | Forward | Dismissed from team |

== Recruiting ==
=== Prep recruits ===
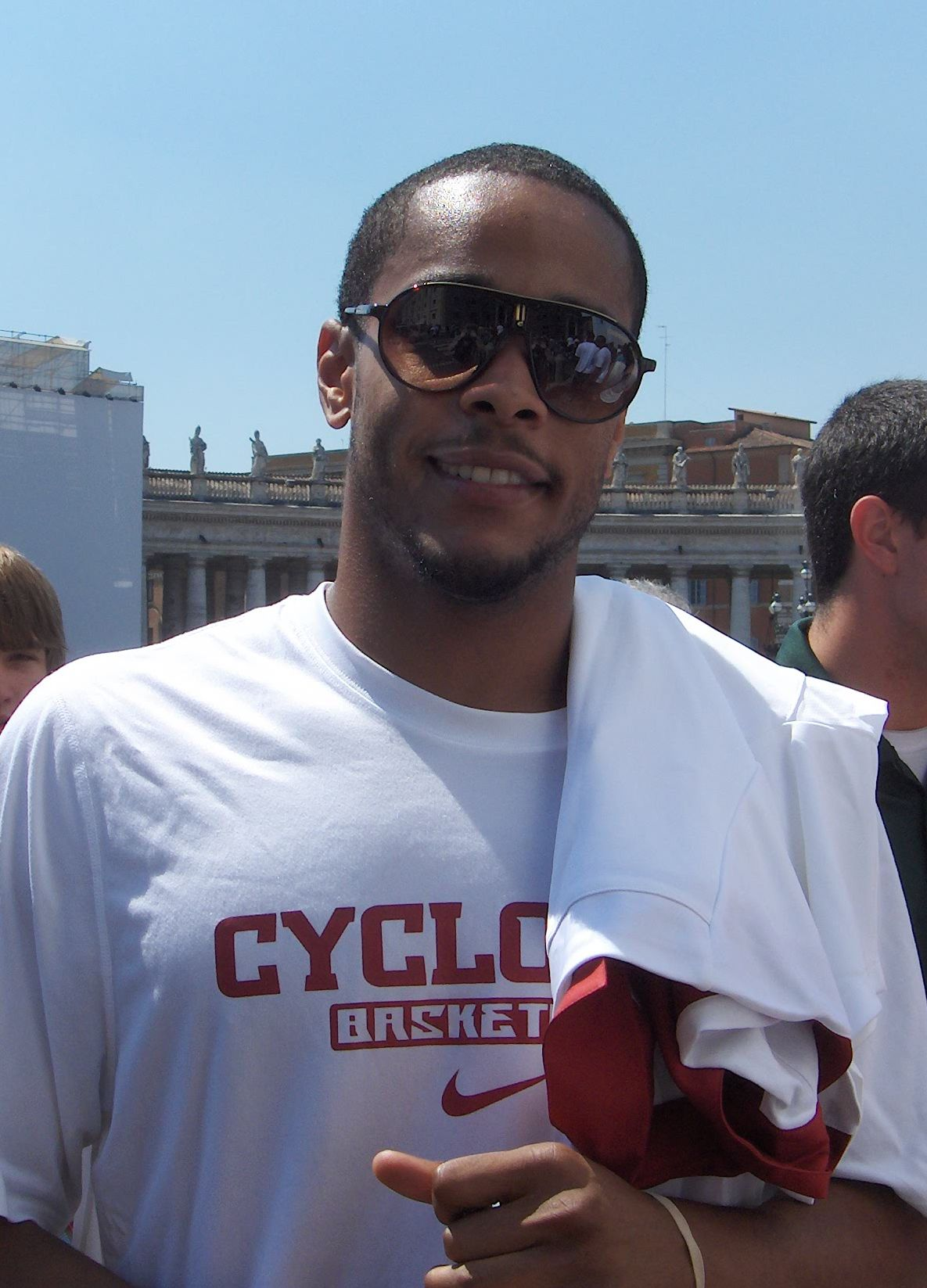
Chris Allen in Italy (Vatican)

College recruiting
| Name | Hometown | School | Height | Weight | Commit date |
|---|---|---|---|---|---|
| Percy Gibson; PF | Detroit | Southeastern High | 6 ft 7 in (2.01 m) | 185 lb (84 kg) | May 22, 2011 |
| Percy Gibson; PF | Recruit ratings: Scout: Rivals: 247Sports: ESPN: (89) | | | | |
| Tavon Sledge; PG | Spring Valley, New York | Half Hollow Hills West | 5 ft 9 in (1.75 m) | 175 lb (79 kg) | Sep 27, 2010 |
| Tavon Sledge; PG | Recruit ratings: Scout: Rivals: 247Sports: ESPN: (88) | | | | |
| Elgin Cook; SF | Milwaukee | Hamilton | 6 ft 6 in (1.98 m) | 190 lb (86 kg) | Aug 22, 2009 |
| Elgin Cook; SF | Recruit ratings: Scout: Rivals: 247Sports: ESPN: (90) | | | | |
Overall recruit ranking: 247Sports: 75
Note: In many cases, Scout, Rivals, 247Sports, On3, and ESPN may conflict in their listings of height and weight.; In these cases, the average was taken. ESPN grades are on a 100-point scale.; Sources: "Iowa State 2010 Basketball Commitments". Rivals.; "2011 Iowa State Basketball Commits". Scout.; "ESPN". ESPN.; "Scout.com Team Recruiting Rankings". Scout.; "2011 Team Ranking". Rivals.

=== Incoming transfers ===
Incoming transfers
| Name | Position | Hometown | Previous school | Remaining eligibility | Notes |
|---|---|---|---|---|---|
| Tyrus McGee | Guard | Stringtown, Oklahoma | Cowley County CC | 2 | McGee was eligible to play immediately. |
| Korie Lucious | Guard | Milwaukee | Michigan State | 1 | Lucious sat out the 2011–12 season due to NCAA eligibility rules. |
| Will Clyburn | Guard | Detroit | Utah | 1 | Clyburn sat out the 2011–12 season due to NCAA eligibility rules. |

== Preseason ==
In August 2011, the team took a week-long trip to Italy. In addition to playing several scrimmages against local teams, they toured Milan, Florence, the Colosseum, the Vatican, and other landmarks.

== Roster ==
2011–12 Iowa State Cyclones men's basketball team
Players
Coaches

| Pos. | # | Name | Height | Weight | Year | Previous school | Hometown |
|---|---|---|---|---|---|---|---|
| C | 0 | Jordan Railey | 6 ft 11 in (2.11 m) | 245 lb (111 kg) | So | Beaverton High | Beaverton, OR |
| G | 1 | Bubu Palo | 6 ft 1 in (1.85 m) | 175 lb (79 kg) | RS So | Ames High | Ames, Iowa |
| G | 2 | Chris Babb | 6 ft 5 in (1.96 m) | 220 lb (100 kg) | RS Jr | Penn State | Arlington, Texas |
| F | 3 | Melvin Ejim | 6 ft 6 in (1.98 m) | 215 lb (98 kg) | So | Brewster Academy | Toronto |
| G | 4 | Chris Allen | 6 ft 3 in (1.91 m) | 205 lb (93 kg) | RS Sr | Michigan State | Lawrenceville, GA |
| G | 5 | Tavon Sledge | 5 ft 9 in (1.75 m) | 175 lb (79 kg) | Fr | Half Hollow Hills West | Spring Valley, New York |
| G | 10 | Aaron Law | 5 ft 11 in (1.8 m) | 175 lb (79 kg) | Fr | Tilton | Chapel Hill, North Carolina |
| G | 11 | Scott Christopherson | 6 ft 3 in (1.91 m) | 205 lb (93 kg) | RS Sr | Marquette | La Crosse, Wisconsin |
| G | 12 | Austin McBeth (redshirt) | 6 ft 1 in (1.85 m) | 185 lb (84 kg) | RS Jr | Iowa Western CCnote=W | Wayland, Iowa |
| G | 21 | Will Clyburn (redshirt) | 6 ft 7 in (2.01 m) | 205 lb (93 kg) | RS Sr | Utah | Detroit |
| F | 22 | Anthony Booker | 6 ft 9 in (2.06 m) | 245 lb (111 kg) | RS Jr | Southern Illinois | Florissant, Missouri |
| F | 24 | Percy Gibson | 6 ft 9 in (2.06 m) | 245 lb (111 kg) | Fr | Southeastern High | Detroit |
| G | 25 | Tyrus McGee | 6 ft 2 in (1.88 m) | 205 lb (93 kg) | Jr | Cowley County CC | Stringtown, Oklahoma |
| F | 30 | Royce White | 6 ft 8 in (2.03 m) | 250 lb (113 kg) | RS So | Minnesota | Minneapolis |
| G | 34 | Korie Lucious (redshirt) | 5 ft 11 in (1.8 m) | 175 lb (79 kg) | RS Sr | Michigan State | Milwaukee |

Head coach

- Fred Hoiberg (Iowa State)

Assistant coach(es)

- T.J. Otzelberger (UW–Whitewater)
- Matt Abdelmassih (St. John's)
- Cornell Mann (Akron)

Legend

- (C) Team captain
- (S) Suspended
- (I) Ineligible
- (W) Walk-on
- Injured
- Current redshirt

== Schedule and results ==
| Date time, TV | Rank^{#} | Opponent^{#} | Result | Record | Site (attendance) city, state |
Exhibition
| November 6, 2011*; 12:30pm, CloneZone | | Grand Valley State | W 77–62 | – | Hilton Coliseum (13,221); Ames, Iowa |
Regular season
| November 12, 2011*; 1:00pm, Mediacom | | Lehigh | W 86–77 | 1–0 | Hilton Coliseum (13,343); Ames, Iowa |
| November 15, 2011*; 8:00pm, Mediacom | | at Drake | L 65–74 | 1–1 | Knapp Center (5,665); Des Moines, Iowa |
| November 20, 2011*; 12:30pm, Mediacom | | Western Carolina; South Padre Island Invitational | W 92–60 | 2–1 | Hilton Coliseum (10,922); Ames, Iowa |
| November 22, 2011*; 7:00pm, Mediacom | | Northern Colorado; South Padre Island Invitational | W 90–82 | 3–1 | Hilton Coliseum (11,155); Ames, Iowa |
| November 25, 2011*; 7:30pm | | vs. Providence; South Padre Island Invitational | W 64–54 | 4–1 | South Padre Island Convention Centre (675); South Padre Island, Texas |
| November 26, 2011*; 6:30pm, CBSSN | | vs. Rice; South Padre Island Invitational | W 90–63 | 5–1 | South Padre Island Convention Centre (660); South Padre Island, Texas |
| November 30, 2011*; 7:00pm, Mediacom | | Northern Iowa | L 62–69 | 5–2 | Hilton Coliseum (13,509); Ames, Iowa |
| December 3, 2011*; 11:00am, BTN | | at No. 15 Michigan | L 66–76 | 5–3 | Crisler Arena (10,845); Ann Arbor, Michigan |
| December 6, 2011*; 7:00pm, Mediacom | | Prairie View A&M | W 84–59 | 6–3 | Hilton Coliseum (12,915); Ames, Iowa |
| December 9, 2011*; 7:00pm, Big 12 Network | | Iowa; Iowa Corn Cy-Hawk Series | W 86–76 | 7–3 | Hilton Coliseum (14,356); Ames, Iowa |
| December 18, 2011*; 1:00pm, Big 12 Network | | Central Michigan | W 59–52 | 8–3 | Hilton Coliseum (11,764); Ames, Iowa |
| December 21, 2011*; 7:00pm, Mediacom | | Lipscomb | W 81–64 | 9–3 | Hilton Coliseum (11,513); Ames, Iowa |
| December 31, 2011*; 12:00pm, Big 12 Network | | Mississippi Valley State | W 67–65 | 10–3 | Hilton Coliseum (12,399); Ames, Iowa |
| January 4, 2012; 8:00pm, ESPNU | | Texas | W 77–71 | 11–3 (1–0) | Hilton Coliseum (12,248); Ames, Iowa |
| January 7, 2012; 3:00pm, Big 12 Network | | at Texas A&M | W 74–50 | 12–3 (2–0) | Reed Arena (6,450); College Station, Texas |
| January 11, 2012; 7:00pm, Big 12 Network | | No. 9 Missouri | L 69–76 | 12–4 (2–1) | Hilton Coliseum (13,198); Ames, Iowa |
| January 14, 2012; 3:00pm, Big 12 Network | | at No. 10 Kansas | L 73–82 | 12–5 (2–2) | Allen Fieldhouse (16,300); Lawrence, Kansas |
| January 18, 2012; 8:00pm, ESPNU | | Oklahoma State | W 71–68 | 13–5 (3–2) | Hilton Coliseum (12,397); Ames, Iowa |
| January 21, 2012; 4:00pm, ESPN2 | | at Texas Tech | W 76–52 | 14–5 (4–2) | United Spirit Arena (8,367); Lubbock, Texas |
| January 24, 2012; 8:00pm, LHN | | at Texas | L 55–62 | 14–6 (4–3) | Frank Erwin Center (10,117); Austin, Texas |
| January 28, 2012; 1:00pm, ESPN | | No. 5 Kansas | W 72–64 | 15–6 (5–3) | Hilton Coliseum (14,376); Ames, Iowa |
| January 31, 2012; 8:00pm, Big 12 Network | | Kansas State | W 72–70 | 16–6 (6–3) | Hilton Coliseum (13,456); Ames, Iowa |
| February 4, 2012; 5:00pm, ESPN2 | | at Oklahoma | W 77–70 | 17–6 (7–3) | Lloyd Noble Center (9,272); Norman, Oklahoma |
| February 7, 2012; 6:00pm, ESPN2 | | at Oklahoma State | L 67–69 | 17–7 (7–4) | Gallagher-Iba Arena (9,365); Stillwater, Oklahoma |
| February 11, 2012; 3:00 p.m., Big 12 Network | | Texas A&M | W 69–46 | 18–7 (8–4) | Hilton Coliseum (14,376); Ames, Iowa |
| February 13, 2012; 6:00 p.m., ESPNU | | at No. 10 Baylor | L 64–79 | 18–8 (8–5) | Ferrell Center (7,047); Waco, Texas |
| February 18, 2012; 12:45pm, Big 12 Network | | Oklahoma | W 80–69 | 19–8 (9–5) | Hilton Coliseum (14,376); Ames, Iowa |
| February 22, 2012; 8:00pm, ESPNU | | Texas Tech | W 72–54 | 20–8 (10–5) | Hilton Coliseum (13,587); Ames, Iowa |
| February 25, 2012; 12:45pm, Big 12 Network | | at Kansas State | W 65–61 | 21–8 (11–5) | Bramlage Coliseum (12,528); Manhattan, Kansas |
| February 29, 2012; 7:00pm, Big 12 Network | | at No. 7 Missouri | L 72–78 | 21–9 (11–6) | Mizzou Arena (14,837); Columbia, Missouri |
| March 3, 2012; 6:00pm, Big 12 Network | | No. 9 Baylor | W 80–72 | 22–9 (12–6) | Hilton Coliseum (14,376); Ames, Iowa |
Big 12 Tournament
| March 8, 2012; 8:30pm, Big 12 Network | No. 25 | vs. Texas; Quarterfinals | L 65–71 | 22–10 | Sprint Center (18,972); Kansas City, Missouri |
NCAA Tournament
| March 15, 2012*; 8:20pm, TBS | (8) | vs. (9) Connecticut; Second round | W 77–64 | 23–10 | KFC Yum! Center (22,131); Louisville, Kentucky |
| March 17, 2012*; 6:45pm, CBS | (8) | vs. (1) No. 1 Kentucky; Third round | L 71–87 | 23–11 | KFC Yum! Center (21,757); Louisville, Kentucky |
*Non-conference game. ^{#}Rankings from AP poll. (#) Tournament seedings in parentheses. All times are in Central Time.

== Rankings ==
Ranking movements Legend: ██ Increase in ranking ██ Decrease in ranking RV = Received votes
| | Week | | | | | | | | | | | | | | | | | | | |
| Poll | Pre | 1 | 2 | 3 | 4 | 5 | 6 | 7 | 8 | 9 | 10 | 11 | 12 | 13 | 14 | 15 | 16 | 17 | 18 | Final |
|---|---|---|---|---|---|---|---|---|---|---|---|---|---|---|---|---|---|---|---|---|
| AP poll | | | | | | | | | | | | RV | RV | RV | RV | | RV | 25 | RV | |
| Coaches Poll | | | | | | | | | | | RV | RV | RV | RV | RV | RV | RV | RV | RV | RV |

== Awards and honors ==
- All-American

Royce White (Honorable Mention)

- All-Conference Selections

Royce White (1st Team)
Scott Christopherson (3rd Team)
Chris Allen (Honorable Mention)
Melvin Ejim (Honorable Mention)

- Big 12 Coach of the Year

Fred Hoiberg

- Academic All-Big 12 First Team

Scott Christopherson
Bubu Palo
Melvin Ejim

- Ralph A. Olsen Award

Royce White
