= 2011–12 Texas Tech Red Raiders basketball team =

American college basketball season

2011–12 Texas Tech Red Raiders basketball
- Conference: Big 12
- Record: 8–23 (1–17 Big 12)
- Head coach: Billy Gillispie (1st season)
- Assistant coaches: Chris Walker (1st season); Jeff Kidder (1st season); Bubba Jennings (4th season)
- Home arena: United Spirit Arena

2011–12 Big 12 men's basketball standings
	Conf.				Overall
Team	W		L	PCT	W		L	PCT
No. 6 Kansas	16	–	2	.889	32	–	7	.821
No. 3 Missouri †	14	–	4	.778	30	–	5	.857
Iowa State	12	–	6	.667	23	–	11	.676
No. 9 Baylor	12	–	6	.667	30	–	8	.789
Kansas State	10	–	8	.556	22	–	11	.667
Texas	9	–	9	.500	20	–	14	.588
Oklahoma State	7	–	11	.389	15	–	18	.455
Oklahoma	5	–	13	.278	15	–	16	.484
Texas A&M	4	–	14	.222	14	–	18	.438
Texas Tech	1	–	17	.056	8	–	23	.258
† 2012 Big 12 Tournament winner Rankings from AP poll

The 2011–12 Texas Tech Red Raiders basketball team represented Texas Tech University in the 2011–12 NCAA Division I men's basketball season. The Red Raiders were led by Billy Gillispie in his first and only season as head coach. The team played its home games at the United Spirit Arena in Lubbock, Texas and were members of the Big 12 Conference.

== Schedule ==
Date time, TV	Rank^{#}	Opponent^{#}	Result	Record	Site (attendance) city, state
Exhibition
11/03/2011*; 7:00PM		Southwestern Oklahoma State	W 76–70	–	United Spirit Arena (2,188); Lubbock, TX
11/05/2011*; 7:00PM		Our Lady of the Lake	W 119–80	–	United Spirit Arena (1,292); Lubbock, TX
Non-conference regular season
11/11/2011*; 8:30PM, TTSN/FSSW+		Troy	W 90–85	1–0	United Spirit Arena (10,088); Lubbock, TX
11/16/2011*; 7:00PM, TTSN/FSSW		North Texas	W 69–64	2–0	United Spirit Arena (8,614); Lubbock, TX
11/20/2011*; 2:00PM, TTSN/FSSW		Stephen F. Austin	W 66–54	3–0	United Spirit Arena (9,420); Lubbock, TX
11/24/2011*; 11:00AM, ESPN2		vs. Indiana State; Old Spice Classic Quarterfinals	L 49–60	3–1	HP Field House (3,170); Orlando, FL
11/25/2011*; 1:30PM, ESPNU		vs. DePaul; Old Spice Classic	L 70–76	3–2	HP Field House (3,337); Orlando, FL
11/27/2011*; 10:30AM, ESPN3		vs. Wake Forest; Old Spice Classic 7th Place Game	L 61–70	3–3	HP Field House (1,728); Orlando, FL
12/01/2011*; 7:00PM, CSS		at Texas A&M-Corpus Christi	W 63–52	4–3	American Bank Center (2,719); Corpus Christi, TX
12/06/2011*; 6:00PM, CBSSN		at TCU	L 69–75	4–4	Daniel–Meyer Coliseum (6,290); Fort Worth, TX
12/18/2011*; 7:00PM, TTSN/FSSW		Grambling State	W 87–59	5–4	United Spirit Arena (8,171); Lubbock, TX
12/22/2011*; 7:05PM, FCS Central		at Oral Roberts	L 56–72	5–5	Mabee Center (8,064); Tulsa, OK
12/27/2011*; 7:00PM, TTSN/FSSW+		Cal State Bakersfield	W 74–58	6–5	United Spirit Arena (10,678); Lubbock, TX
12/30/2011*; 8:00PM, ESPNU		Southeastern Louisiana	W 62–54	7–5	United Spirit Arena (8,079); Lubbock, TX
Big 12 Regular Season
01/04/2012; 7:00PM		at Oklahoma State	L 59–67	7–6 (0–1)	Gallagher-Iba Arena (9,228); Stillwater, OK
01/07/2012; 12:45PM, Big 12 Network		No. 4 Baylor	L 60–73	7–7 (0–2)	United Spirit Arena (8,247); Lubbock, Texas
01/11/2012; 8:00PM, ESPNU		No. 10 Kansas	L 49–87	7–8 (0–3)	United Spirit Arena (7,454); Lubbock, TX
01/14/2012; 12:45PM, Big 12 Network		at Texas A&M	L 54–67	7–9 (0–4)	Reed Arena (7,083); College Station, TX
01/17/2012; 7:00PM, Big 12 Network		at Oklahoma	L 55–64	7–10 (0–5)	Lloyd Noble Center (7,786); Norman, OK
01/21/2012; 4:00PM, ESPN2		Iowa State	L 52–76	7–11 (0–6)	United Spirit Arena (8,367); Lubbock, TX
01/25/2012; 8:00PM, ESPNU		No. 22 Kansas State	L 47–69	7–12 (0–7)	United Spirit Arena (7,941); Lubbock, TX
01/28/2012; 12:45PM, Big 12 Network		at No. 2 Missouri	L 50–63	7–13 (0–8)	Mizzou Arena (15,061); Columbia, MO
01/31/2012; 7:00PM, Big 12 Network		Oklahoma State	L 63–80	7–14 (0–9)	United Spirit Arena (7,408); Lubbock, TX
02/04/2012; 6:00PM, Longhorn Network		at Texas	L 57–74	7–15 (0–10)	Frank Erwin Center (13,859); Austin, TX
02/07/2012; 7:00PM, Big 12 Network		at Kansas State	L 46–65	7–16 (0–11)	Bramlage Coliseum (12,528); Manhattan, KS
02/11/2012; 7:00PM, TTSN/FSSW+		Oklahoma	W 65–47	8–16 (1–11)	United Spirit Arena (7,525); Lubbock, TX
02/14/2012; 6:00PM, ESPN2		Texas A&M	L 38–47	8–17 (1–12)	United Spirit Arena (7,837); Lubbock, TX
02/18/2012; 7:00PM, Big 12 Network		at No. 4 Kansas	L 50–83	8–18 (1–13)	Allen Fieldhouse (16,300); Lawrence, KS
02/22/2012; 8:00PM, ESPNU		at Iowa State	L 54–72	8–19 (1–14)	Hilton Coliseum (13,587); Ames, IA
02/25/2012; 3:00PM, Big 12 Network		Texas	L 67–71	8–20 (1–15)	United Spirit Arena (10,393); Lubbock, TX
02/27/2012; 8:00PM, ESPNU		at No. 9 Baylor	L 48–77	8–21 (1–16)	Ferrell Center (7,123); Waco, TX
03/03/2012; 3:00PM, Big 12 Network		No. 7 Missouri	L 55–81	8–22 (1–17)	United Spirit Arena (7,892); Lubbock, TX
2012 Big 12 men's basketball tournament
03/07/2012; 8:30 pm, Big 12 Network		vs. Oklahoma State	L 60–76	8–23	Sprint Center (18,972); Kansas City, MO
*Non-conference game. ^{#}Rankings from AP Poll. (#) Tournament seedings in parentheses. All times are in Central Time.

== Rankings ==
Ranking movement Legend: ██ Increase in ranking. ██ Decrease in ranking.
Poll	Pre	Wk 1	Wk 2	Wk 3	Wk 4	Wk 5	Wk 6	Wk 7	Wk 8	Wk 9	Wk 10	Wk 11	Wk 12	Wk 13	Wk 14	Wk 15	Wk 16	Wk 17	Wk 18	Final
AP	NR	NR	NR	NR	NR	NR	NR	NR	NR	NR	NR	NR	NR	NR	NR	NR	NR	NR		
Coaches	NR	NR	NR	NR	NR	NR	NR	NR	NR	NR	NR	NR	NR	NR	NR	NR	NR	NR		
