= 2011–12 Big 12 men's basketball season =

2011–12 Big 12 Men's Basketball Season
- League: NCAA Division I
- Sport: Basketball
- Teams: 10
- TV partner(s): CBS, ESPN, FSN

Regular Season
- 2012 Big 12 Champions: Kansas
- Season MVP: Thomas Robinson, Kansas

Tournament
- Champions: Missouri
- Runners-up: Baylor
- Finals MVP: Kim English

Basketball seasons
- 2010–11 2012–13

2011–12 Big 12 men's basketball standings
	Conf.				Overall
Team	W		L	PCT	W		L	PCT
No. 6 Kansas	16	–	2	.889	32	–	7	.821
No. 3 Missouri †	14	–	4	.778	30	–	5	.857
Iowa State	12	–	6	.667	23	–	11	.676
No. 9 Baylor	12	–	6	.667	30	–	8	.789
Kansas State	10	–	8	.556	22	–	11	.667
Texas	9	–	9	.500	20	–	14	.588
Oklahoma State	7	–	11	.389	15	–	18	.455
Oklahoma	5	–	13	.278	15	–	16	.484
Texas A&M	4	–	14	.222	14	–	18	.438
Texas Tech	1	–	17	.056	8	–	23	.258
† 2012 Big 12 Tournament winner Rankings from AP poll

The 2011–12 Big 12 Conference men's basketball season began with practices on October 15, 2011, and ended with the Big 12 Tournament, won by Missouri on March 10, 2012, at the Sprint Center in Kansas City.

It was the first season in which 10 teams participated, since Colorado left for the Pac-12 and Nebraska joined the Big Ten. It was also the final season in this conference for Texas A&M and Missouri before they both joined the SEC for the 2012–13 season.

== Pre-season polls and teams ==
Pre-Season Poll:

	Big 12 Media
1.	Kansas (5)
	Texas A&M (2)
3.	Baylor (2)
4.	Missouri (1)
5.	Texas
6.	Kansas State
7.	Oklahoma State
8.	Iowa State
9.	Oklahoma
	Texas Tech

Pre-Season All-Big 12 Teams

Big 12 Media	Big 12 Coaches
J'Covan Brown Texas; Marcus Denmon Missouri; Khris MiddletonTexas A&M; **Perry Jones III Baylor**; Thomas Robinson Kansas	

- Players in bold are choices for Big 12 Player of the Year

== Rankings ==
Legend
Increase in ranking
Decrease in ranking
Not ranked previous week

		Pre	Wk 2	Wk 3	Wk 4	Wk 5	Wk 6	Wk 7	Wk 8	Wk 9	Wk 10	Wk 11	Wk 12	Wk 13	Wk 14	Wk 15	Wk 16	Wk 17	Wk 18	Wk 19	Final
Baylor	AP	12	11	9	7	6	6	6	6	4	4	3	6	6	6	9	13	9	12	9	
Baylor	C	12	12	10	8	7	7	7	7	5	4	3	7	6	6	10	14	10	11	10	8
Iowa State	AP										RV			RV	RV	RV		RV	25	RV	
Iowa State	C										RV		RV	RV	RV	RV	RV	RV	RV	RV	RV
Kansas	AP	13	12	14	15	13	12	12	17	14	10	7	5	8	7	4	4	3	3	6	
Kansas	C	13	11	14	14	13	12	11	18	15	10	7	5	8	10	5	5	4	3	6	2
Kansas State	AP					RV		RV	RV	23	18	25	22	RV	RV			RV	RV	RV	
Kansas State	C	RV				RV		RV	25	22	18	RV	24	RV			RV	RV	RV	RV	RV
Missouri	AP	25	24	21	13	10	10	9	8	7	9	5	2	4	4	3	3	7	5	3	
Missouri	C	25	25	21	13	10	8	8	8	6	9	5	2	4	4	3	3	8	5	3	11
Oklahoma	AP																				
Oklahoma	C						RV	RV													
Oklahoma State	AP																				
Oklahoma State	C		RV	RV																	
Texas	AP	RV	RV	RV																	
Texas	C	RV	RV	RV	RV																
Texas A&M	AP	20	19	25	25	22	22	RV	RV	RV											
Texas A&M	C	19	18	24	RV	25	22	RV													
Texas Tech	AP																				
Texas Tech	C																				

== Postseason ==
Session	Game	Time*	Matchup^{#}	Television	Attendance
First Round – Wednesday, March 7
1	1	6:00 PM	#8 Oklahoma vs #9 **Texas A&M**	Big 12 Network	18,972
1	2	8:30 PM	#7 **Oklahoma State** vs #10 Texas Tech	Big 12 Network	18,972
Quarterfinals – Thursday, March 8
2	3	11:30 AM	#4 **Baylor** vs #5 Kansas State	ESPN2	18,972
2	4	2:00 PM	#1 **Kansas** vs #9 Texas A&M	ESPN2	18,972
3	5	6:00 PM	#2 **Missouri** vs #7 Oklahoma State	Big 12 Network	18,972
3	6	8:30 PM	#3 Iowa State vs #6 **Texas**	Big 12 Network	18,972
Semifinals – Friday, March 9
4	7	6:30 PM	#1 Kansas vs. #4 **Baylor**	Big 12 Network & ESPNU	18,972
4	8	9:00 PM	#2 **Missouri** vs. #6 Texas	Big 12 Network & ESPNU	18,972
Championship Game – Saturday, March 10
5	9	5:00 PM	#4 Baylor vs. #2 **Missouri**	ESPN	19,006
*Game Times in CT. #-Rankings denote tournament seeding.

=== 2012 NBA draft ===
The following current 1st, 2nd & 3rd team All-Big 12 performers were listed as seniors: Tyshawn Taylor, Marcus Denmon, Quincy Acy, Keiton Page, Scott Christopherson, Kim English The deadline for entering the NBA draft is April 29, but once one has declared, the deadline for withdrawing the declaration and retaining NCAA eligibility is April 10. The deadline for submitting information to the NBA Advisory Committee for a 72-hour response is April 3.
The following Big 12 underclassmen have sought the advice of the NBA's undergraduate advisory committee to determine his draft prospects.
The following Big 12 underclassmen declared early for the 2011 draft: Royce White, J'Covan Brown, Thomas Robinson, Perry Jones III, Khris Middleton, Quincy Miller
The following Big 12 underclassmen entered their name in the draft but who did not hire agents and opted to return to college:

Round	Pick	Player	Position	Nationality	Team	School/club team
1	5	Thomas Robinson	PF	United States	Sacramento Kings	Kansas (Jr.)
1	16	Royce White	PF	United States	Houston Rockets (from New York) (Note: On February 18, 2010, the Houston Rockets acquired Jordan Hill, Jared Jeffries, a future conditional first-round draft pick (the 16th pick) and the option to swap 2011 first-round draft picks from the New York Knicks in a three-team trade with the Knicks and the Sacramento Kings.)	Iowa St. (So.)
1	28	Perry Jones III	PF	United States	Oklahoma City Thunder	Baylor (So.)
2	37	Quincy Acy	PF	United States	Toronto Raptors	Baylor (Sr.)
2	38	Quincy Miller	SF	United States	Denver Nuggets (from Golden State via New York) (Note: On February 22, 2011, the Denver Nuggets acquired Wilson Chandler, Raymond Felton, Danilo Gallinari, Timofey Mozgov, a 2014 first-round draft pick, Golden State Warriors' 2012 (the 38th pick) and 2013 second-round draft picks, the option to swap 2016 first-round draft picks and cash considerations from the New York Knicks in a three-team trade with the Knicks and the Minnesota Timberwolves. Previously, on July 9, 2010, the Knicks acquired Anthony Randolph, Kelenna Azubuike, Ronny Turiaf and two second-round draft picks from the Warriors in exchange for David Lee.)	Baylor (Fr.)
2	39	Khris Middleton	SF	United States	Detroit Pistons	Texas A&M (Jr.)
2	41	Tyshawn Taylor	PG	United States	Portland Trail Blazers (traded to Brooklyn) (Note: The Brooklyn Nets acquired the draft rights to 41st pick Tyshawn Taylor from the Portland Trail Blazers in exchange for cash considerations.)	Kansas (Sr.)
2	44	Kim English	SG	United States	Detroit Pistons (from Houston) (Note: On June 25, 2009, the Detroit Pistons acquired a future conditional second-round draft pick (the 44th pick) and cash considerations from the Houston Rockets in exchange for the draft rights to Chase Budinger.)	Missouri (Sr.)
2	59	Marcus Denmon	PG	United States	San Antonio Spurs	Missouri (Sr.)
