= 2011 Diamond Head Classic =

College basketball competition

- Season: 2011–12
- Teams: 8
- Finals site: Stan Sheriff Center; Honolulu, Hawaii
- Champions: Kansas State (1st title)
- Runner-up: Long Beach State (1st title game)
- Semifinalists: UTEP (1st semifinal); Auburn (1st semifinal)
- Winning coach: Frank Martin (1st title)
- MVP: Rodney McGruder (Kansas State)

The 2011 Diamond Head Classic was a mid-season eight-team college basketball tournament played on December 22, 23, and 25 at the Stan Sheriff Center in Honolulu, Hawaii. It was the third annual Diamond Head Classic tournament and was part of the 2011–12 NCAA Division I men's basketball season. Kansas State defeated Long Beach State to win the tournament championship. Rodney McGruder was named the tournament's MVP.

== Bracket ==
5th Place Game; December 25
Clemson	68
Hawai'i	75
7th Place Game; December 25
Southern Illinois	77
14	Xavier	87

Consolation 2nd Round; December 23
Clemson	83
Southern Illinois	75
14	Xavier	82
Hawai'i	84

First Round; December 22
UTEP	61
Clemson	48
Kansas State	83
Southern Illinois	58
Long Beach State	68
14	Xavier	58
Auburn	65
Hawai'i	62

Semifinals; December 23
UTEP	70
15	Kansas State	78
Long Beach State	64
Auburn	43

Championship; December 25
Kansas State	77
Long Beach State	60
3rd Place Game; December 25
UTEP	83
Auburn	76

== All-tournament team ==
Name	Position	College	Class
Rodney McGruder	SG	Kansas State	JR
Jamar Samuels	F	Kansas State	SR
Larry Anderson	G	Long Beach State	SR
Michael Perez	G	UTEP	SO
Zane Johnson	G	Hawai'i	SR
