= 2011–12 Oklahoma Sooners men's basketball team =

American college basketball season

2011–12 Oklahoma Sooners men's basketball
- Conference: Big 12
- Record: 15–16 (5–13 Big 12)
- Head coach: Lon Kruger
- Assistant coaches: Steve Henson; Lew Hill; Chris Crutchfield
- Home arena: Lloyd Noble Center

2011–12 Big 12 men's basketball standings
	Conf.				Overall
Team	W		L	PCT	W		L	PCT
No. 6 Kansas	16	–	2	.889	32	–	7	.821
No. 3 Missouri †	14	–	4	.778	30	–	5	.857
Iowa State	12	–	6	.667	23	–	11	.676
No. 9 Baylor	12	–	6	.667	30	–	8	.789
Kansas State	10	–	8	.556	22	–	11	.667
Texas	9	–	9	.500	20	–	14	.588
Oklahoma State	7	–	11	.389	15	–	18	.455
Oklahoma	5	–	13	.278	15	–	16	.484
Texas A&M	4	–	14	.222	14	–	18	.438
Texas Tech	1	–	17	.056	8	–	23	.258
† 2012 Big 12 Tournament winner Rankings from AP poll

The 2011–12 Oklahoma Sooners basketball team represented the University of Oklahoma in the 2011–12 NCAA Division I men's basketball season. The Sooners were led by Lon Kruger in his first season. The team played its home games at the Lloyd Noble Center in Norman, Oklahoma and were members of the Big 12 Conference.

== Preseason ==
=== Coaching Change ===
On March 14, 2011, Oklahoma fired Jeff Capel, after the Sooners had back-to-back losing seasons for the first time since 1967. Capel led the Sooners to a 17-36 record since Blake Griffin left for the NBA. Overall, Capel was 96-69 in five seasons. Capel received a $1.75 million buyout from Oklahoma. On April 2, 2011, it was announced that Lon Kruger would leave UNLV to become the Sooners new coach. Kruger will be paid about $2.2 million annually.

=== Preseason Poll ===
The Sooners were picked to finish 9th in conference play.

=== Class of 2011 ===
College recruiting information
Name	Hometown	School	Height	Weight	Commit date
Casey Arent; C	Penryn, California	Del Oro High School	6 ft 10 in (2.08 m)	227 lb (103 kg)	Apr 24, 2011
Casey Arent; C	Recruit ratings: Scout: Rivals: (JC)				
Sam Grooms; PG	Greensboro, North Carolina	Charis Prep	6 ft 1 in (1.85 m)	203 lb (92 kg)	Apr 10, 2011
Sam Grooms; PG	Recruit ratings: Scout: Rivals: (JC)				

== Roster ==
#	Name	Height	Weight (lbs.)	Position	Class	Hometown	Previous Team(s)
1	Sam Grooms	6'1"	203	G	Jr.	Greensboro, North Carolina, U.S.	Chipola College; Charis Prep
2	Steven Pledger	6'4"	222	G	Jr.	Chesapeake, Virginia, U.S.	Atlantic Shores Christian School
3	T. J. Franklin	5'11"	175	G	Sr.	Fort Worth, Texas, U.S.	North Crowley HS
4	Andrew Fitzgerald	6'8"	247	F	Jr.	Baltimore, Maryland, U.S.	Brewster Academy
5	C. J. Washington	6'7"	230	F	Sr.	Stringtown, Oklahoma, U.S.	Connors State; Stringtown HS
12	Jarrod Kruger	6'1"	174	G	So.	Topeka, Kansas, U.S.	Kansas State; Topeka West HS
13	James Fraschilla	5'10"	142	G	Fr.	Dallas, Texas, U.S.	Highland Park HS
14	Carl Blair, Jr.	6'2"	205	G	Jr.	Houston, Texas, U.S.	University of New Orleans; Bridgton Academy
15	Tyler Neal	6'7"	227	F	So.	Oklahoma City, Oklahoma, U.S.	Putnam City West HS
21	Cameron Clark	6'6"	198	G	So.	Sherman, Texas, U.S.	Sherman HS
22	Amath M'Baye	6'9"	214	F	Jr.	Bordeaux, France	Wyoming; Stoneridge Prep
24	Romero Osby	6'8"	232	F	Jr.	Meridian, Mississippi, U.S.	Mississippi State; North Lauderdale HS
31	Barry Honoré	6'7"	270	F	Sr.	Garland, Texas, U.S.	Southern; South Garland HS
32	Casey Arent	6'10"	227	C	Jr.	Penryn, California, U.S.	Sierra College; Del Oro HS

The Sooners' second leading scorer, Calvin Newell, transferred to the University of Central Florida. Newell decided to leave Oklahoma due to family issues.

== Schedule ==
Date time, TV	Rank^{#}	Opponent^{#}	Result	Record	Site (attendance) city, state
Exhibition
11/01/2011*; 7:00 pm, Sooner Sports Network		Northeastern State	W 85–51		Lloyd Noble Center (3,187); Norman, OK
11/06/2011*; 2:00 pm, Sooner Sports Network		Washburn	W 85–59		Lloyd Noble Center (2,608); Norman, OK
Regular Season
11/11/2011*; 7:000 pm, Sooner Sports Network		Idaho State	W 78–74	1–0	Lloyd Noble Center (7,622); Norman, OK
11/18/2011*; 7:00 pm, Sooner Sports Network		Coppin State	W 92–65	2–0	Lloyd Noble Center (7,460); Norman, OK
11/24/2011*; 10:30 pm, ESPN2		vs. Washington State; 76 Classic Quarterfinals	W 79–74	3–0	Anaheim Convention Center (1,457); Anaheim, CA
11/25/2011*; 11:00 pm, ESPN2		vs. Santa Clara; 76 Classic Semifinals	W 85–73	4–0	Anaheim Convention Center (1,777); Anaheim, CA
11/27/2011*; 8:00 pm, ESPN2		vs. Saint Louis; 76 Classic Finals	L 63–83	4–1	Anaheim Convention Center (2,637); Anaheim, CA
12/02/2011*; 7:00 pm, Sooner Sports Network		Sacramento State	W 82–53	5–1	Lloyd Noble Center (7,460); Norman, OK
12/08/2011*; 7:00 pm, Sooner Sports Network		Oral Roberts	W 73–59	6–1	Lloyd Noble Center (7,699); Norman, OK
12/10/2011*; 2:00 pm, Sooner Sports Network		Arkansas	W 78–63	7–1	Lloyd Noble Center (9,077); Norman, OK
12/17/2011*; 7:00 pm, ESPNU		vs. Houston; All-College Classic	W 79–74	8–1	Chesapeake Energy Arena (5,303); Oklahoma City, OK
12/21/2011*; 7:00 pm, Sooner Sports Network		South Carolina State	W 83–48	9–1	Lloyd Noble Center (8,136); Norman, OK
12/29/2011*; 8:00 pm, ESPNU		at Cincinnati	L 55–56	9–2	U.S. Bank Arena (4,439); Cincinnati, OH
12/31/2011*; 2:00 pm, Sooner Sports Network		Northwestern State	W 83–63	10–2	Lloyd Noble Center (8,532); Norman, OK
01/03/2012; 7:00 pm, Mizzou Sports Network		at No. 7 Missouri	L 49–87	10–3 (0–1)	Mizzou Arena (15,061); Columbia, MO
01/07/2012; 1:00 pm, ESPNU		No. 14 Kansas	L 61–72	10–4 (0–2)	Lloyd Noble Center (11,268); Norman, OK
01/09/2012; 6:00 pm, ESPNU		at Oklahoma State	L 65–72	10–5 (0–3)	Gallagher-Iba Arena (9,478); Stillwater, OK
01/14/2012; 12:30 pm, Big 12 Network		No. 18 Kansas State	W 82–73	11–5 (1–3)	Lloyd Noble Center (8,812); Norman, OK
01/17/2012; 7:00 pm, Big 12 Network		Texas Tech	W 64–55	12–5 (2–3)	Lloyd Noble Center (7,786); Norman, OK
01/21/2012; 3:00 pm, Big 12 Network		at Texas A&M	L 75–81	12–6 (2–4)	Reed Arena (8,468); College Station, TX
01/24/2012; 7:00 pm, Big 12 Network		No. 6 Baylor	L 65–77	12–7 (2–5)	Lloyd Noble Center (8,004); Norman, OK
01/28/2012; 6:00 pm, FS Kansas City		at No. 22 Kansas State	W 63–60	13–7 (3–5)	Bramlage Coliseum (12,528); Manhattan, KS
02/01/2012; 8:00 pm, ESPNU		at No. 8 Kansas	L 62–84	13–8 (3–6)	Allen Fieldhouse (16,300); Lawrence, KS
02/04/2012; 5:00 pm, ESPN2		Iowa State	L 70–77	13–9 (3–7)	Lloyd Noble Center (9,272); Norman, OK
02/06/2012; 6:00 pm, ESPNU		No. 4 Missouri	L 68-71	13–10 (3–8)	Lloyd Noble Center (7,794); Norman, OK
02/11/2012; 7:00 pm, Texas Tech Sports Network		at Texas Tech	L 47-65	13–11 (3–9)	United Spirit Arena (7,525); Lubbock, TX
02/14/2012; 7:00 pm, Big 12 Network		Texas	L 58-69	13–12 (3–10)	Lloyd Noble Center (5,314); Norman, OK
02/18/2012; 12:30 pm, Big 12 Network		at Iowa State	L 69-80	13–13 (3–11)	Hilton Coliseum (14,376); Ames, IA
02/22/2012; 7:00 pm, Big 12 Network		Oklahoma State	W 77-64	14–13 (4–11)	Lloyd Noble Center (9,393); Norman, OK
02/25/2012; 12:30 pm, Big 12 Network		at No. 13 Baylor	L 60-70	14–14 (4–12)	Ferrell Center (7,793); Waco, TX
02/29/2012; 8:00 pm, ESPN2		at Texas	L 64–72	14–15 (4–13)	Frank Erwin Center (12,142); Austin, TX
03/03/2012; 3:00 pm, Big 12 Network		Texas A&M	W 65–62	15–15 (5–13)	Lloyd Noble Center (6,188); Norman, OK
2012 Big 12 men's basketball tournament
03/07/2012; 6:00 pm, Big 12 Network		vs. Texas A&M; First Round	L 53–62	15–16	Sprint Center (18,972); Kansas City, MO
*Non-conference game. ^{#}Rankings from AP Poll. (#) Tournament seedings in parentheses. All times are in Central Time.

== Rankings ==
Ranking movement Legend: ██ Increase in ranking. ██ Decrease in ranking.
Poll	Pre	Wk 1	Wk 2	Wk 3	Wk 4	Wk 5	Wk 6	Wk 7	Wk 8	Wk 9	Wk 10	Wk 11	Wk 12	Wk 13	Wk 14	Wk 15	Wk 16	Wk 17	Wk 18	Final
AP	NR	NR	NR	NR	NR	NR	NR													
Coaches	NR	NR	NR	NR	NR	RV	RV	NR												
