= 2011–12 Kansas State Wildcats men's basketball team =

American college basketball season

2011–12 Kansas State Wildcats men's basketball

Diamond Head Classic Champions

NCAA Tournament, Round of 32
- Conference: Big 12 Conference
- Record: 22–11 (10–8 Big 12)
- Head coach: Frank Martin (5th season)
- Assistant coaches: Matt Figger; Brad Underwood; Lamont Evans
- Home arena: Bramlage Coliseum (12,528)

2011–12 Big 12 men's basketball standings
	Conf.				Overall
Team	W		L	PCT	W		L	PCT
No. 6 Kansas	16	–	2	.889	32	–	7	.821
No. 3 Missouri †	14	–	4	.778	30	–	5	.857
Iowa State	12	–	6	.667	23	–	11	.676
No. 9 Baylor	12	–	6	.667	30	–	8	.789
Kansas State	10	–	8	.556	22	–	11	.667
Texas	9	–	9	.500	20	–	14	.588
Oklahoma State	7	–	11	.389	15	–	18	.455
Oklahoma	5	–	13	.278	15	–	16	.484
Texas A&M	4	–	14	.222	14	–	18	.438
Texas Tech	1	–	17	.056	8	–	23	.258
† 2012 Big 12 Tournament winner Rankings from AP poll

The 2011–12 Kansas State Wildcats men's basketball team represented Kansas State University in the 2011–12 NCAA Division I men's basketball season. The head coach was Frank Martin, who served in his 5th year at the helm of the Wildcats. The team played its home games in Bramlage Coliseum in Manhattan, Kansas, as they have done so since 1988. Kansas State is a member of the Big 12 Conference. The team set a school record for fewest points allowed in the shot clock era. The team concluded the conference season with 10–8 to finish in 5th place in the Big 12. They were defeated by Baylor in the quarterfinals in the 2012 Big 12 men's basketball tournament. The team made to the 2012 NCAA Division I men's basketball tournament for the third straight year, where they beat Southern Miss in the second round, and lost to Syracuse in the third round to close the season with a 22–11 record.

== Preseason ==
The team played their home games at the Bramlage Coliseum, which has a capacity of 12,528. They are in their 16th season as a member of the Big 12 Conference. Coming back from their 2010–11 season, they compiled a record of 22–11 and advanced to the Round of 32 of the 2011 NCAA Division I men's basketball tournament.

=== Departures ===
Name	Number	Pos.	Height	Weight	Year	Hometown	Notes
Jacob Pullen	0	G	6'0"	200	Senior	Maywood, IL	Graduated
Devon Peterson	2	G	6'3"	190	Junior	Brooklyn, NY	Transferred
Juevol Myles	4	G	6'1"	190	Sophomore	Ajax, ONT	Transferred
Nick Russell	12	F	6'4"	200	Sophomore	Duncanville, TX	Transferred
Curtis Kelly	24	F	6'8"	250	Senior	New York, NY	Graduated
Alex Potuzak	31	F	6'9"	190	Freshman	Clyde, KS	Quit basketball (still enrolled at K-State)

=== Class of 2011–12 Recruits ===
College recruiting information
Name	Hometown	School	Height	Weight	Commit date
Adrian Diaz; C	Miami, FL	Hialeah-Miami Lakes	6 ft 10 in (2.08 m)	225 lb (102 kg)	Aug 1, 2010
Adrian Diaz; C	Recruit ratings: Scout: Rivals: (90)				
Angel Rodríguez; PG	Miami, FL	Krop	5 ft 11 in (1.80 m)	180 lb (82 kg)	Apr 26, 2011
Angel Rodríguez; PG	Recruit ratings: Scout: Rivals: (90)				
Thomas Gipson; PF	Cedar Hill, Texas	Cedar Hill	6 ft 7 in (2.01 m)	275 lb (125 kg)	Apr 27, 2011
Thomas Gipson; PF	Recruit ratings: Scout: Rivals: (90)				
Nino Williams; SG	Leavenworth, KS	Leavenworth	6 ft 5 in (1.96 m)	180 lb (82 kg)	Oct 2, 2009
Nino Williams; SG	Recruit ratings: Scout: Rivals: (90)				
Jeremy Jones; SG	Leavenworth, KS	Seward County C.C.	6 ft 1 in (1.85 m)	160 lb (73 kg)	Apr 25, 2011
Jeremy Jones; SG	Recruit ratings: Rivals: (40)				
Omari Lawrence; SG	Concordia, KS	Cloud County C.C.	6 ft 4 in (1.93 m)	209 lb (95 kg)	Mar 23, 2011
Omari Lawrence; SG	Recruit ratings: Rivals: (40)				
James Watson; PF	Arkansas City, KS	Cowley County C.C.	6 ft 8 in (2.03 m)	220 lb (100 kg)	Apr 25, 2011
James Watson; PF	Recruit ratings: (40)				
Overall recruit ranking:
Note: In many cases, Scout, Rivals, 247Sports, On3, and ESPN may conflict in their listings of height and weight.; In these cases, the average was taken. ESPN grades are on a 100-point scale.; Sources: "2011 Kansas State Basketball Commits". Rivals.; "2011 Kansas State Basketball Commits". Scout.; "2011 Kansas State Basketball Commits". ESPN.; "Scout.com Team Recruiting Rankings". Scout.; "2011 Team Ranking". Rivals.

== Schedule ==
Date time, TV	Rank^{#}	Opponent^{#}	Result	Record	Site (attendance) city, state
Exhibition
November 6, 2011*; 1:00 pm, FSKC		Fort Hays State	W 90–60	–	Bramlage Coliseum (12,528); Manhattan, KS
Regular Season
November 11, 2011*; 7:00 pm, FSKC		Charleston Southern	W 72–67	1–0	Bramlage Coliseum (12,528); Manhattan, KS
November 14, 2011*; 7:00 pm, FSKC		Loyola-Chicago	W 74–61	2–0	Bramlage Coliseum (12,450); Manhattan, KS
November 22, 2011*; 7:00 pm, FSKC		Maryland Eastern Shore	W 92–50	3–0	Bramlage Coliseum (12,528); Manhattan, KS
December 1, 2011*; 7:00 pm, FSKC		George Washington	W 69–56	4–0	Bramlage Coliseum (12,528); Manhattan, KS
December 4, 2011*; 4:30 pm, ESPNU		at Virginia Tech	W 69–61	5–0	Cassell Coliseum (8,782); Blacksburg, VA
December 8, 2011*; 8:00 pm, ESPN2		vs. West Virginia; Wichita Wildcat Classic	L 80–84 ^{2OT}	5–1	Intrust Bank Arena (15,004); Wichita, KS
December 11, 2011*; 1:00 pm, FSKC		North Florida	W 79–68 ^{OT}	6–1	Bramlage Coliseum (12,528); Manhattan, KS
December 17, 2011*; 9:00 pm, ESPNU		vs. No. 23 Alabama; Hy-Vee Wildcat Classic	W 71–58	7–1	Sprint Center (16,685); Kansas City, MO
December 22, 2011*; 4:00 pm, ESPNU		vs. Southern Illinois; Diamond Head Classic Quarterfinals	W 83–58	8–1	Stan Sheriff Center (6,751); Honolulu, HI
December 23, 2011*; 4:00 pm, ESPNU		vs. UTEP; Diamond Head Classic semifinals	W 78–70	9–1	Stan Sheriff Center (6,676); Honolulu, HI
December 25, 2011*; 9:00 pm, ESPN2		vs. Long Beach State; Diamond Head Classic championship	W 77–60	10–1	Stan Sheriff Center (6,270); Honolulu, HI
December 31, 2011*; 1:00 pm, FSKC		Howard	W 83–46	11–1	Bramlage Coliseum (12,528); Manhattan, KS
Big 12 Season
January 4, 2012; 7:00 pm, Big 12 Network	No. 23	at No. 14 Kansas; Sunflower Showdown	L 49–67	11–2 (0–1)	Allen Fieldhouse (16,300); Lawrence, KS
January 7, 2012; 12:30 pm, Big 12 Network	No. 23	No. 7 Missouri	W 75–59	12–2 (1–1)	Bramlage Coliseum (12,528); Manhattan, KS
January 10, 2012; 7:00 pm, FSKC	No. 18	No. 4 Baylor	L 73–75	12–3 (1–2)	Bramlage Coliseum (12,528); Manhattan, KS
January 14, 2012; 12:30 pm, Big 12 Network	No. 18	at Oklahoma	L 73–82	12–4 (1–3)	Lloyd Noble Center (8,812); Norman, OK
January 18, 2012; 8:00 pm, ESPN2	No. 25	Texas	W 84–80	13–4 (2–3)	Bramlage Coliseum (12,528); Manhattan, KS
January 21, 2012; 12:30 pm, Big 12 Network	No. 25	at Oklahoma State	W 66–58	14–4 (3–3)	Gallagher-Iba Arena (10,338); Stillwater, OK
January 25, 2012; 8:00 pm, ESPNU	No. 22	at Texas Tech	W 69–47	15–4 (4–3)	United Spirit Arena (7,941); Lubbock, TX
January 28, 2012; 6:00 pm, FSKC	No. 22	Oklahoma	L 60–63	15–5 (4–4)	Bramlage Coliseum (12,528); Manhattan, KS
January 31, 2012; 8:00 pm, FSKC		at Iowa State	L 70–72	15–6 (4–5)	Hilton Coliseum (13,456); Ames, IA
February 4, 2012; 3:00 pm, Big 12 Network		Texas A&M	W 64–53	16–6 (5–5)	Bramlage Coliseum (12,528); Manhattan, KS
February 7, 2012; 7:00 pm, Big 12 Network		Texas Tech	W 65–46	17–6 (6–5)	Bramlage Coliseum (12,528); Manhattan, KS
February 11, 2012; 1:00 pm, ESPN		at Texas	L 64–75	17–7 (6–6)	Frank Erwin Center (14,134); Austin, TX
February 13, 2012; 8:00 pm, ESPN		No. 4 Kansas; Sunflower Showdown	L 53–59	17–8 (6–7)	Bramlage Coliseum (12,528); Manhattan, KS
February 18, 2012; 12:30 pm, Big 12 Network		at No. 9 Baylor	W 57–56	18–8 (7–7)	Ferrell Center (7,174); Waco, TX
February 21, 2012; 6:00 pm, ESPN2		at No. 3 Missouri	W 78–68	19–8 (8–7)	Mizzou Arena (15,061); Columbia, MO
February 25, 2012; 12:30 pm, Big 12 Network		Iowa State	L 61–65	19–9 (8–8)	Bramlage Coliseum (12,528); Manhattan, KS
February 28, 2012; 6:00 pm, ESPN2		at Texas A&M	W 66–60	20–9 (9–8)	Reed Arena (8,085); College Station, TX
March 3, 2012; 12:30 pm, Big 12 Network		Oklahoma State	W 77–58	21–9 (10–8)	Bramlage Coliseum (12,528); Manhattan, KS
2012 Big 12 men's basketball tournament
March 8, 2012; 11:30 am, ESPN2		vs. No. 12 Baylor; Quarterfinals	L 74–82	21–10	Sprint Center (16,776); Kansas City, MO
2012 NCAA tournament
March 15, 2012*; 11:40 am, truTV	No. (8)	vs. (9) Southern Miss; Second Round	W 70–64	22–10	Consol Energy Center (18,927); Pittsburgh, PA
March 17, 2012*; 11:15 am, CBS	No. (8)	vs. No. 2 (1) Syracuse; Third Round	L 59–75	22–11	Consol Energy Center (18,588); Pittsburgh, PA
*Non-conference game. ^{#}Rankings from AP Poll. (#) Tournament seedings in parentheses. All times are in Central Time (#) during NCAA Tournament is seed.

== Rankings ==
Poll	Pre	Wk 1	Wk 2	Wk 3	Wk 4	Wk 5	Wk 6	Wk 7	Wk 8	Wk 9	Wk 10	Wk 11	Wk 12	Wk 13	Wk 14	Wk 15	Wk 16	Wk 17	Wk 18	Final
AP	NR	NR	NR	NR	RV	NR	RV	RV	23	18	25	22	RV	NR	NR	NR	RV	RV	NR	NR
Coaches	RV	NR	NR	NR	RV	NR	RV	25	22	18	RV	25	RV	NR	NR	RV	RV	RV	NR	NR

== Roster ==
2011–12 Kansas State Wildcats men's basketball team
Players
Coaches

Pos.	#	Name	Height	Weight	Year	Hometown
G	1	Shane Southwell	6 ft 6 in (1.98 m)	220 lb (100 kg)	So	Harlem, NY
G	3	Martavious Irving	6 ft 1 in (1.85 m)	210 lb (95 kg)	Jr	Fort Lauderdale, Fl
F	10	Victor Ojeleye	6 ft 6 in (1.98 m)	225 lb (102 kg)	Sr	Ottawa, KS
F	11	Nino Williams	6 ft 6 in (1.98 m)	226 lb (103 kg)	RS Fr	St. Louis, MO
F	12	Omari Lawrence	6 ft 3 in (1.91 m)	220 lb (100 kg)	So	Bronx, NY
G	13	Angel Rodríguez	5 ft 11 in (1.8 m)	180 lb (82 kg)	Fr	Miami, FL
F	14	James Watson	6 ft 10 in (2.08 m)	230 lb (104 kg)	Jr	Atoka, OK
F	20	Adrian Diaz	6 ft 10 in (2.08 m)	225 lb (102 kg)	Fr	Miami, FL
F	21	Jordan Henriquez	6 ft 11 in (2.11 m)	250 lb (113 kg)	Jr	Port Chester, NY
G	22	Rodney McGruder	6 ft 4 in (1.93 m)	205 lb (93 kg)	Jr	Washington, D.C.
G	24	Jermey Jones	6 ft 2 in (1.88 m)	170 lb (77 kg)	Jr	Chicago, IL
F	32	Jamar Samuels	6 ft 7 in (2.01 m)	230 lb (104 kg)	Sr	Washington, D.C.
G	33	Brian Rohleder	6 ft 3 in (1.91 m)	210 lb (95 kg)	Fr	Wichita, KS
G	40	Shawn Meyer	6 ft 3 in (1.91 m)	210 lb (95 kg)	Fr	Lee's Summit, MO
F	42	Thomas Gipson	6 ft 7 in (2.01 m)	275 lb (125 kg)	Fr	Ceder Hill, TX
G	55	Will Spradling	6 ft 2 in (1.88 m)	180 lb (82 kg)	So	Overland Park, KS

Head coach

- Frank Martin (FIU)

Assistant coach(es)

- Brad Underwood (Kansas State)
- Matt Figger (Eastern Kentucky)
- Lamont Evans (Kansas State)

Legend

- (C) Team captain
- (S) Suspended
- (I) Ineligible
- (W) Walk-on
- Injured
- Current redshirt

Roster
Last update: 2011-11-01

=== Depth chart ===
Pos.	Starting 5	Bench 1	Bench 2	Bench 3
C	Jordan Henriquez	Thomas Gipson	Adrian Diaz
PF	Jamar Samuels	Thomas Gipson	Victor Ojeleye	James Watson
SF	Rodney McGruder	Victor Ojeleye	Nino Williams	Omari Lawrence
SG	Angel Rodriguez	Rodney McGruder	Will Spradling	Jeremy Jones
PG	Will Spradling	Shane Southwell	Angel Rodriguez	Martavious Irving

== See also ==
- 2011-12 NCAA Division I men's basketball season
- 2011–12 NCAA Division I men's basketball rankings
- 2012 Big 12 men's basketball tournament
- 2012 NCAA Division I men's basketball tournament
