= 2011–12 Baylor Bears basketball team =

American college basketball season

2011–12 Baylor Bears men's basketball

Las Vegas Classic Champions

NCAA Tournament, Elite Eight
- Conference: Big 12 Conference

Ranking
- Coaches: No. 8
- AP: No. 9
- Record: 30–8 (12–6 Big 12)
- Head coach: Scott Drew
- Assistant coaches: Jerome Tang; Grant McCasland; Paul Mills
- Home arena: Ferrell Center

2011–12 Big 12 men's basketball standings
	Conf.				Overall
Team	W		L	PCT	W		L	PCT
No. 6 Kansas	16	–	2	.889	32	–	7	.821
No. 3 Missouri †	14	–	4	.778	30	–	5	.857
Iowa State	12	–	6	.667	23	–	11	.676
No. 9 Baylor	12	–	6	.667	30	–	8	.789
Kansas State	10	–	8	.556	22	–	11	.667
Texas	9	–	9	.500	20	–	14	.588
Oklahoma State	7	–	11	.389	15	–	18	.455
Oklahoma	5	–	13	.278	15	–	16	.484
Texas A&M	4	–	14	.222	14	–	18	.438
Texas Tech	1	–	17	.056	8	–	23	.258
† 2012 Big 12 Tournament winner Rankings from AP poll

The 2011–12 Baylor Bears basketball team represented Baylor University in the 2011–12 NCAA Division I men's basketball season. The team finished 30–7 overall and 12–6 in Big 12 Conference play to finish in a third-place tie with Iowa State. In postseason play, Baylor lost to Missouri in the 2012 Big 12 men's basketball tournament championship game and Kentucky in the Elite Eight of the 2012 NCAA Division I men's basketball tournament.

== Preseason ==
From August 12 to 15, the Baylor Bears participated in the Canadian Foreign Tour which began their preseason, going 3-1 during the tour. The Bears concluded their preseason against Abilene Christian University. The Bears began regular season play ranked 12th in both the AP and USA Today Coaches Preseason polls.

== Coaching ==
9th season head coach Scott Drew coached the team to the fourth most conference wins (12) and tied for second in overall wins (30).

== NCAA tournament ==
In the 2011–12 season, Baylor went 27–7, with their highest ranking being #3. They also won the Continental Tires Las Vegas Classic. As a result, they were placed as a #3 seed in the South region of the NCAA Tournament.

In Baylor's second-round game of the tournament, sophomore Brady Heslip had nine 3-pointers, which was a career high. Baylor beat 11th seed University of Colorado. They faced Xavier University in the Sweet 16.

In the Sweet 16 game vs Xavier University, Baylor had a 20–4 lead, with the lead shortening to 7 at the half. Quincy Acy finished with 20 points and 15 rebounds. Point guard Pierre Jackson added 15 and Perry Jones III had 14 points. Brady Heslip scored 4 free throws in the final minute.

On Sunday, March 25, 2012, the Baylor Bears played The University of Kentucky in an Elite 8 match up for a spot in to The Final Four in New Orleans. Kentucky led by 20 points going into half time. In the second half Baylor began a 9–1 run, but the Bears fell to Kentucky 82–70, ending their season.

One of Baylor's four senior's, Quincy Acy, scored double-digits in multiple games, including a career high in blocks with 6 in a game. Acy was named the Big 12 "Best Athlete" by Sporting News. Upon graduation, Acy is eligible prospect for the NBA draft.

== Roster ==
2011–12 Baylor Bears men's basketball team
Players
Coaches

Pos.	#	Name	Height	Weight	Year	Previous school	Hometown
G	0	Gary Franklin	6 ft 2 in (1.88 m)	195 lb (88 kg)	RS So	Mater Dei	Santa Ana, CA
F	1	Perry Jones III	6 ft 11 in (2.11 m)	235 lb (107 kg)	So	Duncanville	Duncanville, TX
F	2	Jacob Neubert	6 ft 5 in (1.96 m)	200 lb (91 kg)	Jr	Midway	Waco, TX
G	3	Fred Ellis	6 ft 6 in (1.98 m)	220 lb (100 kg)	Sr	Sacramento	Sacramento, CA
F	4	Quincy Acy	6 ft 7 in (2.01 m)	235 lb (107 kg)	Sr	Horn	Mesquite, TX
G	5	Brady Heslip	6 ft 2 in (1.88 m)	180 lb (82 kg)	RS So	New Hampton; Boston College	Burlington, Ontario, Canada
C	11	J'Mison Morgan (redshirt)	6 ft 11 in (2.11 m)	265 lb (120 kg)	Sr	South Oak Cliff HS; UCLA	Dallas, TX
G	14	Deuce Bello	6 ft 4 in (1.93 m)	180 lb (82 kg)	Fr	Westchester Country Day School	Greensboro, NC
G	20	Logan Lowery (redshirt)	6 ft 6 in (1.98 m)	185 lb (84 kg)	So	Kingwood; Centenary	Kingwood, TX
G	22	A. J. Walton	6 ft 1 in (1.85 m)	185 lb (84 kg)	Jr	Hall	Little Rock, AR
F	30	Quincy Miller	6 ft 9 in (2.06 m)	210 lb (95 kg)	Fr	Westchester Country Day School	Chicago, IL
F	34	Cory Jefferson	6 ft 9 in (2.06 m)	200 lb (91 kg)	RS So	Killeen	Killeen, TX
F	41	Anthony Jones	6 ft 10 in (2.08 m)	190 lb (86 kg)	Sr	Yates	Houston, TX
G	55	Pierre Jackson	5 ft 10 in (1.78 m)	190 lb (86 kg)	Jr	Desert Pines	Las Vegas, NV

Head coach

- Scott Drew (Butler)

Assistant coach(es)

- Jerome Tang (Charter Oak State)
- Grant McCasland (Baylor)
- Paul Mills (Texas A&M)

Legend

- (C) Team captain
- (S) Suspended
- (I) Ineligible
- (W) Walk-on
- Injured
- Current redshirt

- Gary Franklin, who transferred from California after the 2010 fall semester, became eligible to play for Baylor in the 2012 spring semester.
- Logan Lowery transferred from Centenary after the 2010–11 season. Because Centenary had reclassified to the non-scholarship Division III, Lowery was allowed to immediately play without sitting out a transfer year, but chose to redshirt instead.

== Rankings ==
On December 5, Baylor moved into sixth in the AP Poll and seventh in the Coaches Poll, achieving the highest ranking in school history.

Ranking movements Legend: ██ Increase in ranking ██ Decrease in ranking
	Week																			
Poll	Pre	1	2	3	4	5	6	7	8	9	10	11	12	13	14	15	16	17	18	Final
AP Poll	12	11	9	7	6	6	6	6	4	4	3	6	6	6	9	13	9	12	9	
Coaches Poll	12	12	10	8	7	7	7	7	5	4	3	7	6	6	10	14	10	11	10	8

== Schedule and results ==
- All times are Central

Date time, TV	Rank^{#}	Opponent^{#}	Result	Record	Site (attendance) city, state
Exhibition
8/12/2011*; 4:00pm		vs. Belgium	L 68–81		Maple Leaf Gardens (NA); Toronto, ON
8/13/2011*; 12:00pm		vs. Canadian Juniors	W 104–78		Maple Leaf Gardens (NA); Toronto, ON
8/13/2011*; 7:30pm, sportscanada.tv		at Ryerson Rams	W 93–71		Maple Leaf Gardens (NA); Toronto, ON
8/15/2011*; 7:00pm		vs. Ontario Revolution	W 103–68		Maple Leaf Gardens (NA); Toronto, ON
11/01/2011*; 7:00pm		Abilene Christian	W 81–54		Ferrell Center (3,082); Waco, TX
Regular Season
11/11/2011*; 9:00pm	No. 12	Texas Southern	W 77–57	1–0	Ferrell Center (7,359); Waco, TX
11/13/2011*; 6:00pm	No. 12	Jackson State	W 92–59	2–0	Ferrell Center (6,103); Waco, TX
11/15/2011*; 1:00pm, ESPN	No. 11	San Diego State	W 77–67	3–0	Ferrell Center (6,941); Waco, TX
11/22/2011*; 9:00pm	No. 9	South Carolina State	W 70–50	4–0	Ferrell Center (6,438); Waco, TX
11/23/2011*; 7:00pm, FSSW/FSH	No. 9	UT-Arlington	W 75–65	5–0	Ferrell Center (5,988); Waco, TX
11/29/2011*; 7:00pm, FSSW/FSH	No. 7	Prairie View A&M	W 90–54	6–0	Ferrell Center (6,072); Waco, TX
12/04/2011*; 3:00pm, BTN	No. 7	at Northwestern	W 69–41	7–0	Welsh-Ryan Arena (6,316); Evanston, IL
12/14/2011*; 7:00pm, FSSW/FSH	No. 6	Bethune-Cookman; Continental Tires Las Vegas Classic	W 69–42	8–0	Ferrell Center (8,838); Waco, TX
12/17/2011*; 1:00pm, BYUtv	No. 6	at BYU	W 86–83	9–0	Marriott Center (22,700); Provo, UT
12/19/2011*; 7:00pm	No. 6	Paul Quinn; Continental Tires Las Vegas Classic	W 95–54	10–0	Ferrell Center (5,034); Waco, TX
12/22/2011*; 9:30pm, ESPN3	No. 6	vs. Saint Mary's; Continental Tires Las Vegas Classic	W 72–59	11–0	Orleans Arena (1,526); Las Vegas, NV
12/23/2011*; 8:00pm, ESPN	No. 6	vs. West Virginia; Continental Tires Las Vegas Classic	W 83–81 ^{OT}	12–0	Orleans Arena (1,526); Las Vegas, NV
12/28/2011*; 8:00pm, ESPN2	No. 6	vs. No. 15 Mississippi State; The Showcase	W 54–52	13–0	American Airlines Center (6,707); Dallas, TX
Big 12 Regular Season
01/02/2012; 6:00pm, ESPNU	No. 4	Texas A&M	W 61–52	14–0 (1–0)	Ferrell Center (8,424); Waco, TX
01/07/2012; 12:45pm, Big 12 Network	No. 4	at Texas Tech	W 73–60	15–0 (2–0)	United Spirit Arena (8,247); Lubbock, TX
01/10/2012; 7:00pm, FSSW/FSH	No. 4	at No. 18 Kansas State	W 75–73	16–0 (3–0)	Bramlage Coliseum (12,528); Manhattan, KS
01/14/2012; 2:00pm, ESPN2	No. 4	Oklahoma State	W 106–65	17–0 (4–0)	Ferrell Center (9,594); Waco, TX
01/16/2012; 8:30pm, ESPN	No. 3	at No. 7 Kansas	L 74–92	17–1 (4–1)	Allen Fieldhouse (16,300); Lawrence, KS
01/21/2012; 1:00pm, ESPN	No. 3	No. 5 Missouri	L 88–89	17–2 (4–2)	Ferrell Center (10,617); Waco, TX
01/24/2012; 7:00pm, Big 12 Network	No. 6	at Oklahoma	W 77–65	18–2 (5–2)	Lloyd Noble Center (8,004); Norman, OK
01/28/2012; 12:00pm, CBS	No. 6	Texas	W 76–71	19–2 (6–2)	Ferrell Center (10,299); Waco, TX
02/01/2012; 8:00pm, ESPN2	No. 6	at Texas A&M	W 63–60	20–2 (7–2)	Reed Arena (9,309); College Station, TX
02/04/2012; 12:45pm, Big 12 Network	No. 6	at Oklahoma State	W 64–60	21–2 (8–2)	Gallagher-Iba Arena (10,775); Stillwater, OK
02/08/2012; 6:00pm, ESPN2	No. 6	No. 7 Kansas	L 54–68	21–3 (8–3)	Ferrell Center (9,386); Waco, TX
02/11/2012; 12:45pm, Big 12 Network	No. 6	at No. 4 Missouri	L 57–72	21–4 (8–4)	Mizzou Arena (15,061); Columbia, MO
02/13/2012; 6:00pm, ESPNU	No. 9	Iowa State	W 79–64	22–4 (9–4)	Ferrell Center (7,047); Waco, TX
02/18/2012; 12:45pm, Big 12 Network	No. 9	Kansas State	L 56–57	22–5 (9–5)	Ferrell Center (7,174); Waco, TX
02/20/2012; 8:00pm, ESPN	No. 13	at Texas	W 77–72	23–5 (10–5)	Frank Erwin Center (14,501); Austin, TX
02/25/2012; 12:45pm, Big 12 Network	No. 13	Oklahoma	W 70–60	24–5 (11–5)	Ferrell Center (7,793); Waco, TX
02/27/2012; 8:00pm, ESPNU	No. 9	Texas Tech	W 77–48	25–5 (12–5)	Ferrell Center (7,123); Waco, TX
03/03/2012; 6:00pm, Cyclones TVN	No. 9	at Iowa State	L 72–80	25–6 (12–6)	Hilton Coliseum (14,376); Ames, IA
2012 Big 12 men's basketball tournament
03/08/2012; 11:30am, ESPN2	No. 12	vs. Kansas State; Quarterfinals	W 82–74	26–6	Sprint Center (18,972); Kansas City, MO
03/09/2012; 6:30pm, Big 12 Network/ESPNU	No. 12	vs. No. 3 Kansas; Semifinals	W 81–72	27–6	Sprint Center (18,972); Kansas City, MO
03/10/12; 4:30pm, ESPN	No. 12	vs. No. 5 Missouri; Championship Game	L 75–90	27–7	Sprint Center (18,972); Kansas City, MO
2012 NCAA tournament
03/15/2012*; 6:27 pm, truTV	No. 9 (S 3)	vs. (S 14) South Dakota State; Second Round	W 68–60	28–7	The Pit (N/A); Albuquerque, NM
03/17/2012*; 7:59 pm, TNT	No. 9 (S 3)	vs. (S 11) Colorado; Third Round	W 80–63	29–7	The Pit (N/A); Albuquerque, NM
03/23/2012*; 6:15 pm, CBS	No. 9 (S 3)	vs. (S 10) Xavier; Sweet Sixteen	W 75–70	30–7	Georgia Dome (N/A); Atlanta, Georgia
03/25/2012*; 1:20 pm, CBS	No. 9 (S 3)	vs. No. 1 (S 1) Kentucky; Elite Eight	L 70–82	30–8	Georgia Dome (N/A); Atlanta, GA
*Non-conference game. ^{#}Rankings from AP Poll. (#) Tournament seedings in parentheses. All times are in Central Time. (#) during NCAA Tournament is seed with Region.
