= 2011–12 Texas Longhorns men's basketball team =

American college basketball season

2011–12 Texas Longhorns men's basketball

NCAA Tournament, Round of 64
- Conference: Big 12
- Record: 20–14 (9–9 Big 12)
- Head coach: Rick Barnes
- Assistant coaches: Rob Lanier; Russell Springmann; Chris Ogden
- Home arena: Frank Erwin Center

2011–12 Big 12 men's basketball standings
	Conf.				Overall
Team	W		L	PCT	W		L	PCT
No. 6 Kansas	16	–	2	.889	32	–	7	.821
No. 3 Missouri †	14	–	4	.778	30	–	5	.857
Iowa State	12	–	6	.667	23	–	11	.676
No. 9 Baylor	12	–	6	.667	30	–	8	.789
Kansas State	10	–	8	.556	22	–	11	.667
Texas	9	–	9	.500	20	–	14	.588
Oklahoma State	7	–	11	.389	15	–	18	.455
Oklahoma	5	–	13	.278	15	–	16	.484
Texas A&M	4	–	14	.222	14	–	18	.438
Texas Tech	1	–	17	.056	8	–	23	.258
† 2012 Big 12 Tournament winner Rankings from AP poll

The 2011–12 Texas Longhorns men's basketball team represented the University of Texas at Austin in the 2011–12 NCAA Division I men's basketball season. Their head coach was Rick Barnes, who was in his 14th year. The team played its home games at the Frank Erwin Center in Austin, Texas and are members of the Big 12 Conference. They finished the season 20–14, 9–9 in Big 12 play to finish in sixth place. They lost in the semifinals of the Big 12 Basketball tournament to Missouri. They received an at-large bid to the 2012 NCAA tournament where they lost in the second round to Cincinnati.

== Recruiting ==
College recruiting information
Name	Hometown	School	Height	Weight	Commit date
Jaylen Bond; PF	Philadelphia, PA	Plymouth-Whitemarsh	6 ft 7 in (2.01 m)	220 lb (100 kg)	Aug 2, 2011
Jaylen Bond; PF	Recruit ratings: Scout: Rivals: (91)				
Sterling Gibbs; PG	Scotch Plains, NJ	Seton Hall Prep	6 ft 1 in (1.85 m)	180 lb (82 kg)	May 16, 2011
Sterling Gibbs; PG	Recruit ratings: Scout: Rivals: (91)				
Jonathan Holmes; PF	San Antonio, TX	Antonian College Prep	6 ft 8 in (2.03 m)	220 lb (100 kg)	Oct 1, 2011
Jonathan Holmes; PF	Recruit ratings: Scout: Rivals: (94)				
Myck Kabongo; PG	Toronto, ON	Findlay Prep	6 ft 2 in (1.88 m)	170 lb (77 kg)	Nov 4, 2010
Myck Kabongo; PG	Recruit ratings: Scout: Rivals: (97)				
Julien Lewis; SG	La Marque, TX	La Marque	6 ft 3 in (1.91 m)	190 lb (86 kg)	Jun 22, 2009
Julien Lewis; SG	Recruit ratings: Scout: Rivals: (94)				
Sheldon McClellan; SG	Bellaire, TX	Bellaire	6 ft 5 in (1.96 m)	190 lb (86 kg)	May 4, 2009
Sheldon McClellan; SG	Recruit ratings: Scout: Rivals: (95)				
Overall recruit ranking: Scout: 12 Rivals: 8 ESPN: 8
Note: In many cases, Scout, Rivals, 247Sports, On3, and ESPN may conflict in their listings of height and weight.; In these cases, the average was taken. ESPN grades are on a 100-point scale.; Sources: "Texas 2011 Basketball Commitments". Rivals.; "2011 Texas Basketball Commits". Scout.; "ESPN". ESPN.; "Scout.com Team Recruiting Rankings". Scout.; "2011 Team Ranking". Rivals.

== Schedule ==
Date time, TV	Rank^{#}	Opponent^{#}	Result	Record	Site (attendance) city, state
Regular season
11/13/2011*; 6:00 pm, LHN		Boston University; TicketCity Legends Classic regional round	W 82–46	1–0	Frank Erwin Center (9,862); Austin, TX
11/15/2011*; 3:00 pm, ESPN		Rhode Island; TicketCity Legends Classic regional round	W 100–90	2–0	Frank Erwin Center (8,957); Austin, TX
11/19/2011*; 8:00 pm, LHN		vs. Oregon State; TicketCity Legends Classic semifinals	L 95–100 ^{OT}	2–1	Izod Center (4,187); East Rutherford, NJ
11/21/2011*; 5:30 pm, LHN		vs. NC State; TicketCity Legends Classic third place game	L 74–77	2–2	Izod Center (3,294); East Rutherford, NJ
11/26/2011*; 7:00 pm, LHN		Sam Houston State	W 56–40	3–2	Frank Erwin Center (10,173); Austin, TX
11/29/2011*; 7:00 pm, LHN		North Texas	W 73–57	4–2	Frank Erwin Center (9,488); Austin, TX
12/03/2011*; 3:30 pm, FSN		at UCLA	W 69–59	5–2	LA Sports Arena (6,177); Los Angeles, CA
12/06/2011*; 7:00 pm, LHN		Texas–Arlington	W 80–62	6–2	Frank Erwin Center (9,202); Austin, TX
12/10/2011*; 7:00 pm, LHN		Texas State	W 86–52	7–2	Frank Erwin Center (11,559); Austin, TX
12/13/2011*; 7:00 pm, LHN		Nicholls State	W 93–40	8–2	Frank Erwin Center (9,135); Austin, TX
12/17/2011*; 1:30 pm, ESPN2		Temple	W 77–65	9–2	Frank Erwin Center (11,441); Austin, TX
12/21/2011*; 6:00 pm, ESPN2		at No. 5 North Carolina	L 63–82	9–3	Dean E. Smith Center (21,750); Chapel Hill, NC
12/31/2011*; 1:00 pm, LHN		Rice	W 73–59	10–3	Frank Erwin Center (14,506); Austin, TX
01/04/2012; 8:00 pm, ESPNU		at Iowa State	L 71–77	10–4 (0–1)	Hilton Coliseum (12,248); Ames, IA
01/07/2012; 6:00 pm, LHN		Oklahoma State	W 58–49	11–4 (1–1)	Frank Erwin Center (12,841); Austin, TX
01/11/2012; 8:00 pm, ESPN2		Texas A&M	W 61–51	12–4 (2–1)	Frank Erwin Center (13,917); Austin, TX
01/14/2012; 12:00 pm, ESPN2		at No. 9 Missouri	L 73–84	12–5 (2–2)	Mizzou Arena (14,026); Columbia, MO
01/18/2012; 8:00 pm, ESPN2		at Kansas State	L 80–84	12–6 (2–3)	Bramlage Coliseum (12,528); Manhattan, KS
01/21/2012; 3:00 pm, CBS		No. 7 Kansas	L 66–69	12–7 (2–4)	Frank Erwin Center (16,734); Austin, TX
01/24/2012; 8:00 pm, LHN		Iowa State	W 62–55	13–7 (3–4)	Frank Erwin Center (10,117); Austin, TX
01/28/2012; 12:00 pm, CBS		at No. 6 Baylor	L 71–76	13–8 (3–5)	Ferrell Center (10,299); Waco, TX
01/30/2012; 8:00 pm, ESPN		No. 4 Missouri	L 66–67	13–9 (3–6)	Frank Erwin Center (12,023); Austin, TX
02/04/2012; 6:00 pm, LHN		Texas Tech	W 74–57	14–9 (4–6)	Frank Erwin Center (13,859); Austin, TX
02/06/2012; 8:00 pm, ESPN		at Texas A&M	W 70–68	15–9 (5–6)	Reed Arena (6,173); College Station, TX
02/11/2012; 1:00 pm, ESPN		Kansas State	W 75–64	16–9 (6–6)	Frank Erwin Center (14,134); Austin, TX
02/14/2012; 7:00 pm, Big 12 Network		at Oklahoma	W 69–58	17–9 (7–6)	Lloyd Noble Center (5,314); Norman, OK
02/18/2012; 3:00 pm, Big 12 Network		at Oklahoma State	L 78–90	17–10 (7–7)	Gallagher-Iba Arena (10,438); Stillwater, OK
02/20/2012; 8:00 pm, ESPN		No. 13 Baylor	L 72–77	17–11 (7–8)	Frank Erwin Center (14,501); Austin, TX
02/25/2012; 3:00 pm, Big 12 Network		at Texas Tech	W 71–67	18–11 (8–8)	United Spirit Arena (10,393); Lubbock, TX
02/29/2012; 8:00 pm, ESPN2		Oklahoma	W 72–64	19–11 (9–8)	Frank Erwin Center (12,142); Austin, TX
03/03/2012; 8:00 pm, ESPN		at Kansas	L 63–73	19–12 (9–9)	Allen Fieldhouse (16,300); Lawrence, KS
Phillips 66 Big 12 Championship
03/08/2012; 8:30 p.m., Big 12 Network		vs. No. 25 Iowa State; Quarterfinals	W 75–61	20–12	Sprint Center (18,972); Kansas City, MO
03/08/2012; 8:30 p.m., Big 12 Network/ESPNU		vs. No. 5 Missouri; Semifinals	L 67–81	20–13	Sprint Center (18,972); Kansas City, MO
2012 NCAA tournament
03/16/2012*; 11:15 am, CBS	No. 11 (E)	vs. No. 6 (E) Cincinnati; Second Round	L 59–65	20–14	Bridgestone Arena (11,751); Nashville, TN
*Non-conference game. ^{#}Rankings from AP Poll. (#) Tournament seedings in parentheses. All times are in Central Time.

== Rankings ==
Legend: ██ Increase in ranking. ██ Decrease in ranking.
Poll	Pre	Wk 2	Wk 3	Wk 4	Wk 5	Wk 6	Wk 7	Wk 8	Wk 9	Wk 10	Wk 11	Wk 12	Wk 13	Wk 14	Wk 15	Wk 16	Wk 17	Wk 18	Final
AP																			
Coaches																			

== Roster ==
2011–12 Texas Longhorns men's basketball team
Players
Coaches

Pos.	#	Name	Height	Weight	Year	Hometown
G	0	Julien Lewis	6 ft 3 in (1.91 m)	190 lb (86 kg)	Fr	Galveston, Texas
G	1	Sheldon McClellan	6 ft 4 in (1.93 m)	188 lb (85 kg)	Fr	Houston, Texas
F	2	Jaylen Bond	6 ft 7 in (2.01 m)	224 lb (102 kg)	Fr	Norristown, Pennsylvania
G	5	Dean Melchionni	6 ft 4 in (1.93 m)	193 lb (88 kg)	Jr	Lancaster, Pennsylvania
F	10	Jonathan Holmes	6 ft 7 in (2.01 m)	239 lb (108 kg)	Fr	San Antonio, Texas
G	12	Myck Kabongo	6 ft 1 in (1.85 m)	169 lb (77 kg)	Fr	Toronto, Ontario
G	13	Sterling Gibbs	6 ft 1 in (1.85 m)	185 lb (84 kg)	Fr	Scotch Plains, New Jersey
G	14	J'Covan Brown	6 ft 1 in (1.85 m)	197 lb (89 kg)	Jr	Port Arthur, Texas
F/C	20	Alexis Wangmene	6 ft 7 in (2.01 m)	241 lb (109 kg)	Sr	Maroua, Cameroon
G	22	Andrew Dick	6 ft 2 in (1.88 m)	180 lb (82 kg)	Jr	Sherman, Texas
F/C	53	Clint Chapman	6 ft 10 in (2.08 m)	245 lb (111 kg)	Sr	Canby, Oregon

Head coach

- Rick Barnes (Lenoir–Rhyne)

Assistant coach(es)

- Rob Lanier (St. Bonaventure)
- Russell Springmann (Salisbury)
- Christopher Ogden (Texas)

Legend

- (C) Team captain
- (S) Suspended
- (I) Ineligible
- (W) Walk-on
- Injured
- Current redshirt

Roster
Last update: 2011-10-04
