= Bubu Palo =

American basketball player (born 1991)

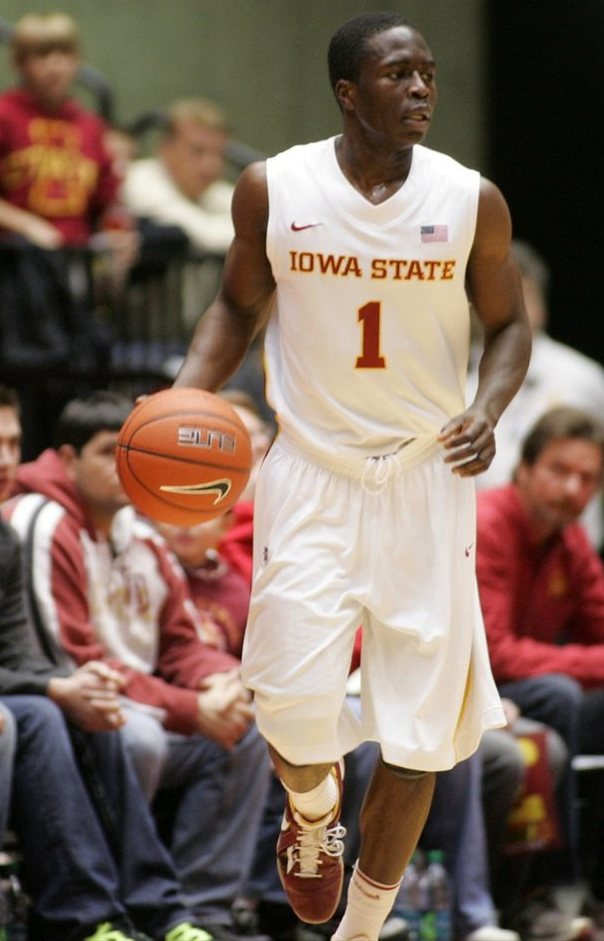
- Palo playing for Iowa State

No. 1 – Antibes Sharks
- Position: Point guard
- League: LNB Pro B

Personal information
- Born: July 9, 1991 (age 35) Ames, Iowa
- Listed height: 6 ft 1 in (1.85 m)
- Listed weight: 180 lb (82 kg)

Career information
- High school: Ames (Ames, Iowa)
- College: Iowa State (2010–2014)
- NBA draft: 2014: undrafted
- Playing career: 2014–present

Career history
- 2014–2015: Texas Legends
- 2015–2020: Sioux Falls Skyforce
- 2021–2022: Team FOG Næstved
- 2022–2023: ALM Évreux
- 2023–present: Antibes Sharks

Career highlights
- NBA D-League champion (2016)
- Stats at Basketball Reference

Yempabou Kevin "Bubu" Palo (born July 9, 1991) is an American professional basketball player for Antibes Sharks of LNB Pro B. He played college basketball for Iowa State University.

== High school career ==
Palo attended Ames High School where he was a teammate of NBA players, Harrison Barnes and Doug McDermott. Palo averaged 9.1 points as a senior to earn second-team All-CIML honors.

== College career ==
Palo attended Iowa State where he made 70 appearances, including nine starts, while averaging 3.4 points, 1.6 rebounds and 1.3 assists.

== Professional career ==
=== Texas Legends (2014–2015) ===
After going undrafted in the 2014 NBA draft, Palo tried out for the Texas Legends of the NBA Development League. He was successful in gaining a roster spot for the 2014–15 season, but his stint lasted just 16 games as he was waived by the Legends on January 9, 2015.

=== Sioux Falls Skyforce (2015–2020) ===
On January 21, 2015, he was acquired by the Sioux Falls Skyforce, and remained with the team for the rest of the season. In 29 games for the Skyforce in 2014–15, he averaged 6.6 points, 2.4 rebounds and 2.9 assists per game.

On November 2, 2015, Palo was reacquired by the Sioux Falls Skyforce. He helped the Skyforce finish with a D-League-best 40–10 record in 2015–16, and went on to help the team win the league championship with a 2–1 Finals series win over the Los Angeles D-Fenders.

On November 1, 2016, Palo was reacquired by the Sioux Falls Skyforce. In the 2017–18 season, he averaged 8.4 points, 2.5 rebounds, and 2.2 assists per game with Sioux Falls.

On January 29, 2019, Palo was suspended for ten games without pay for violating the terms of the league's anti-drug program. On October 15, Palo signed an Exhibit 10 contract with the Miami Heat, which ultimately resulted in a return to Sioux Falls, the Heat's G League affiliate.

== Personal life ==
He is the son of Pierre and Berthe Palo and he majored in finance.
