= 2011–12 Missouri Tigers men's basketball team =

American college basketball season

2011–12 Missouri Tigers men's basketball

Big 12 tournament champions

NCAA Tournament, Round of 64
- Conference: Big 12

Ranking
- Coaches: No. 11
- AP: No. 3
- Record: 30–5 (14–4 Big 12)
- Head coach: Frank Haith
- Assistant coaches: Tim Fuller; Isaac Chew; Ernie Nestor
- Home arena: Mizzou Arena

2011–12 Big 12 men's basketball standings
	Conf.				Overall
Team	W		L	PCT	W		L	PCT
No. 6 Kansas	16	–	2	.889	32	–	7	.821
No. 3 Missouri †	14	–	4	.778	30	–	5	.857
Iowa State	12	–	6	.667	23	–	11	.676
No. 9 Baylor	12	–	6	.667	30	–	8	.789
Kansas State	10	–	8	.556	22	–	11	.667
Texas	9	–	9	.500	20	–	14	.588
Oklahoma State	7	–	11	.389	15	–	18	.455
Oklahoma	5	–	13	.278	15	–	16	.484
Texas A&M	4	–	14	.222	14	–	18	.438
Texas Tech	1	–	17	.056	8	–	23	.258
† 2012 Big 12 Tournament winner Rankings from AP poll

The 2011–12 Missouri Tigers men's basketball team represented the University of Missouri in the 2011–12 NCAA Division I men's basketball season. Their head coach was Frank Haith, who was in his 1st year at Missouri. Haith won AP Coach of the Year honors for this season. The team played its home games at Mizzou Arena in Columbia, Missouri and they were members of the Big 12 Conference. It was the final year in which the Tigers participated in the Big 12 Conference, as they departed for the Southeastern Conference beginning with the 2012–13 season.

== Roster ==
2011–12 Missouri Tigers men's basketball team
Players
Coaches

Pos.	#	Name	Height	Weight	Year	Previous school	Hometown
G	1	Phil Pressey	5 ft 10 in (1.78 m)	175 lb (79 kg)	So	Dallas Episcopal	Dallas, TX
G	2	Jabari Brown (I)	6 ft 5 in (1.96 m)	205 lb (93 kg)	Fr	Oakland; Oregon	Oakland, CA
G	11	Michael Dixon, Jr.	6 ft 1 in (1.85 m)	185 lb (84 kg)	Jr	Lee's Summit West	Kansas City, MO
F	21	Laurence Bowers (injured) (redshirt)	6 ft 8 in (2.03 m)	221 lb (100 kg)	Sr	St. George's	Memphis, TN
G	23	Keion Bell (redshirt)	6 ft 3 in (1.91 m)	200 lb (91 kg)	Jr	Pasadena; Pepperdine	Los Angeles, CA
F	31	Danny Feldmann (redshirt)	6 ft 9 in (2.06 m)	215 lb (98 kg)		Helias High School; Columbia	Jefferson City, MO
G	33	Earnest Ross (redshirt)	6 ft 5 in (1.96 m)	222 lb (101 kg)	Jr	Panther Creek; Auburn	Cary, NC
G	3	Matt Pressey	6 ft 2 in (1.88 m)	195 lb (88 kg)	Sr	Cushing Academy; Navarro CC	Dallas, TX
F	10	Ricardo Ratliffe	6 ft 8 in (2.03 m)	240 lb (109 kg)	Sr	Kecoughtan; Central Florida CC	Hampton, VA
G	12	Marcus Denmon	6 ft 3 in (1.91 m)	185 lb (84 kg)	Sr	Hogan Prep	Kansas City, MO
G	24	Kim English	6 ft 6 in (1.98 m)	200 lb (91 kg)	Sr	Notre Dame Prep	Baltimore, MD
G	25	Jarrett Sutton	6 ft 4 in (1.93 m)	196 lb (89 kg)	Sr	Oak Park	Kansas City, MO
C	32	Steve Moore	6 ft 9 in (2.06 m)	267 lb (121 kg)	Sr	Truman	Kansas City, MO
F	35	Andrew Jones	6 ft 5 in (1.96 m)	255 lb (116 kg)	Jr	Smithville	Smithville, MO
F	44	Andy Rosburg	6 ft 8 in (2.03 m)	220 lb (100 kg)	Jr	Marquette	St. Louis, MO

Head coach

- Frank Haith (Elon)

Assistant coach(es)

- Tim Fuller (Wake Forest)
- Isaac Chew (Avila)
- Ernie Nestor (Alderson–Broaddus)

Legend

- (C) Team captain
- (S) Suspended
- (I) Ineligible
- (W) Walk-on
- Injured
- Current redshirt

Roster
Last update: June 4, 2012

Notes:

- Jabari Brown transferred from Oregon in the 2012 spring semester. He will be eligible to play in the 2013 spring semester.

== Schedule ==
Date time, TV	Rank^{#}	Opponent^{#}	Result	Record	Site (attendance) city, state
Preseason
October 30, 2011*; 5:30 pm, ESPNU	No. 25	Missouri Southern; One State, One Spirit Classic	W 114–68		Leggett & Platt Athletic Center (3,477); Joplin, MO
November 2, 2011*; 7:00 pm, MSN	No. 25	Truman State	W 87–48		Mizzou Arena (N/A); Columbia, MO
November 7, 2011*; 7:00 pm, MSN	No. 25	Central Missouri	W 88–70		Mizzou Arena (N/A); Columbia, MO
Non-conference regular season
November 11, 2011*; 7:00 pm, MSN	No. 25	SE Missouri State	W 83–68	1–0	Mizzou Arena (9,612); Columbia, MO
November 14, 2011*; 7:00 pm, MSN	No. 24	Mercer	W 81–63	2–0	Mizzou Arena (5,778); Columbia, MO
November 17, 2011*; 7:00 pm, MSN	No. 24	Niagara	W 83–52	3–0	Mizzou Arena (6,315); Columbia, MO
November 21, 2011*; 6:30 pm, ESPN2	No. 21	vs. Notre Dame; CBE Classic	W 87–58	4–0	Sprint Center (11,436); Kansas City, MO
November 22, 2011*; 9:00 pm, ESPN2	No. 21	vs. No. 18 California; CBE Classic	W 92–53	5–0	Sprint Center (10,747); Kansas City, MO
November 27, 2011*; 2:00 pm, MSN	No. 21	Binghamton	W 88–59	6–0	Mizzou Arena (5,037); Columbia, MO
December 2, 2011*; 7:00 pm, MSN	No. 13	Northwestern State	W 90–56	7–0	Mizzou Arena (12,252); Columbia, MO
December 6, 2011*; 6:00 pm, ESPN	No. 10	vs. Villanova; Jimmy V Classic	W 81–71	8–0	Madison Square Garden (8,231); New York, NY
December 10, 2011*; 4:00 pm, MSN	No. 10	Navy	W 84–59	9–0	Mizzou Arena (11,529); Columbia, MO
December 15, 2011*; 7:00 pm, MSN	No. 10	Kennesaw State	W 104–67	10–0	Mizzou Arena (8,015); Columbia, MO
December 18, 2011*; 2:00 pm, MSN	No. 10	William & Mary	W 94–56	11–0	Mizzou Arena (9,026); Columbia, MO
December 22, 2011*; 8:00 pm, ESPN2	No. 9	vs. No. 25 Illinois; Braggin' Rights	W 78–74	12–0	Scottrade Center (22,087); St. Louis, MO
December 30, 2011*; 6:00 pm, ESPNU	No. 8	at Old Dominion	W 75–68	13–0	Ted Constant Convocation Center (8,460); Norfolk, VA
Big 12 Regular Season
January 3, 2012; 7:00 pm, MSN	No. 7	Oklahoma	W 87–49	14–0 (1–0)	Mizzou Arena (15,061); Columbia, MO
January 7, 2012; 12:30 pm, Big 12 Network	No. 7	at No. 23 Kansas State	L 59–75	14–1 (1–1)	Bramlage Coliseum (12,528); Manhattan, KS
January 11, 2012; 7:00 pm, Big 12 Network	No. 9	at Iowa State	W 76–69	15–1 (2–1)	Hilton Coliseum (13,198); Ames, IA
January 14, 2012; 12:00 pm, ESPN2	No. 9	Texas	W 84–73	16–1 (3–1)	Mizzou Arena (14,026); Columbia, MO
January 16, 2012; 4:30 pm, ESPN	No. 5	Texas A&M	W 70–51	17–1 (4–1)	Mizzou Arena (15,061); Columbia, MO
January 21, 2012; 1:00 pm, ESPN	No. 5	at No. 3 Baylor	W 89–88	18–1 (5–1)	Ferrell Center (10,617); Waco, TX
January 25, 2012; 6:30 pm, ESPN2	No. 2	at Oklahoma State	L 72–79	18–2 (5–2)	Gallagher-Iba Arena (9,476); Stillwater, OK
January 28, 2012; 12:30 pm, Big 12 Network	No. 2	Texas Tech	W 63–50	19–2 (6–2)	Mizzou Arena (15,061); Columbia, MO
January 30, 2012; 8:00 pm, ESPN	No. 4	at Texas	W 67–66	20–2 (7–2)	Frank Erwin Center (12,023); Austin, TX
February 4, 2012; 8:00 pm, ESPN	No. 4	No. 8 Kansas; Border War and ESPN College GameDay	W 74–71	21–2 (8–2)	Mizzou Arena (15,061); Columbia, MO
February 6, 2012; 6:00 pm, ESPNU	No. 4	at Oklahoma	W 71–68	22–2 (9–2)	Lloyd Noble Center (7,994); Norman, OK
February 11, 2012; 12:30 pm, Big 12 Network	No. 4	No. 6 Baylor	W 72–57	23–2 (10–2)	Mizzou Arena (15,061); Columbia, MO
February 15, 2012; 8:00 pm, ESPN2	No. 3	Oklahoma State	W 83–65	24–2 (11–2)	Mizzou Arena (14,324); Columbia, MO
February 18, 2012; 1:00 pm, ESPN	No. 3	at Texas A&M	W 71–62	25–2 (12–2)	Reed Arena (11,818); College Station, TX
February 21, 2012; 6:00 pm, ESPN2	No. 3	Kansas State	L 68–78	25–3 (12–3)	Mizzou Arena (15,061); Columbia, MO
February 25, 2012; 3:00 pm, CBS	No. 3	at No. 4 Kansas; Border War	L 86–87 ^{OT}	25–4 (12–4)	Allen Fieldhouse (16,300); Lawrence, KS
February 29, 2012; 7:00 pm, Big 12 Network	No. 7	Iowa State	W 78–72	26–4 (13–4)	Mizzou Arena (14,837); Columbia, MO
March 3, 2012; 3:00 pm, Big 12 Network	No. 7	at Texas Tech	W 81–59	27–4 (14–4)	United Spirit Arena (7,892); Lubbock, TX
Big 12 Tournament
March 8, 2012; 6:00 p.m, Big 12 Network	(2) No. 5	vs. (7) Oklahoma State; Quarterfinals	W 88–70	28–4	Sprint Center (18,972); Kansas City, MO
March 9, 2012; 9:00 p.m, Big 12 Network & ESPNU	(2) No. 5	vs. (6) Texas; Semifinals	W 81–67	29–4	Sprint Center (18,972); Kansas City, MO
March 10, 2012; 5:00 p.m, ESPN	(2) No. 5	vs. (4) No. 12 Baylor; Championship	W 90–75	30–4	Sprint Center (18,972); Kansas City, MO
NCAA Tournament
March 16, 2012*; 3:40 p.m, TNT	(2 W) No. 3	vs. (15 W) Norfolk State; West Region First Round	L 84–86	30–5	CenturyLink Center Omaha (16,494); Omaha, NE
*Non-conference game. ^{#}Rankings from AP Poll. (#) Tournament seedings in parentheses. All times are in Central Time.

=== Average Home Attendance ===
2011–12 Season	Conference Games	Non-Conference Games
11,830	14,839	8,446

== Rankings ==
Ranking movements Legend: ██ Increase in ranking ██ Decrease in ranking ( ) = First-place votes
	Week																			
Poll	Pre	1	2	3	4	5	6	7	8	9	10	11	12	13	14	15	16	17	18	Final
AP	25	24	21	13	10	10	9	8	7	9	5	2 (2)	4	4	3	3	6	5	3 (2)	Not released
Coaches	25	25	21	13	10	8	8	8	6	9	5	2	4	4	3	3	8	5	3 (1)	11

*AP does not release post-NCAA Tournament rankings
