= 2011–12 Texas A&M Aggies men's basketball team =

American college basketball season

2011–12 Texas A&M Aggies men's basketball
- Conference: Big 12 Conference
- Record: 14–18 (4–14 Big 12)
- Head coach: Billy Kennedy (1st season)
- Assistant coaches: Glynn Cyprien; Kyle Keller
- Home arena: Reed Arena

2011–12 Big 12 men's basketball standings
	Conf.				Overall
Team	W		L	PCT	W		L	PCT
No. 6 Kansas	16	–	2	.889	32	–	7	.821
No. 3 Missouri †	14	–	4	.778	30	–	5	.857
Iowa State	12	–	6	.667	23	–	11	.676
No. 9 Baylor	12	–	6	.667	30	–	8	.789
Kansas State	10	–	8	.556	22	–	11	.667
Texas	9	–	9	.500	20	–	14	.588
Oklahoma State	7	–	11	.389	15	–	18	.455
Oklahoma	5	–	13	.278	15	–	16	.484
Texas A&M	4	–	14	.222	14	–	18	.438
Texas Tech	1	–	17	.056	8	–	23	.258
† 2012 Big 12 Tournament winner Rankings from AP poll

The 2011–12 Texas A&M Aggies men's basketball team represented Texas A&M University in the 2011–12 NCAA Division I men's basketball season. Billy Kennedy was in his first season as head coach after the position was vacated by Mark Turgeon in May 2011. The team played its home games in Reed Arena as members of the reformed ten member Big 12 Conference for the final season as they departed for the Southeastern Conference in 2012–13.

== Previous season ==
The Aggies finished the previous year with a 24–9 record, 12–6 in Big 12 play, a semi-finals appearance in the Big 12 tournament, and a first-round appearance in the NCAA tournament.

== Preseason ==
=== Player departures ===
The Aggies will be without starting guard B.J. Holmes and starting forward Nathan Walkup. Other losses include guards Derrek Lewis and Andrew Darko, as well as forward Marshall Carrell.

=== Recruiting ===
College recruiting information
Name	Hometown	School	Height	Weight	Commit date
Jamal Branch; PG	Arlington, Texas	Grace Prep	6 ft 3 in (1.91 m)	163 lb (74 kg)	Sep 1, 2008
Jamal Branch; PG	Recruit ratings: Scout: Rivals: (95)				
Jordan Green; SG	Flower Mound, Texas	Flower Mound	6 ft 3 in (1.91 m)	165 lb (75 kg)	Aug 24, 2009
Jordan Green; SG	Recruit ratings: Scout: Rivals: (91)				
Overall Recruiting Rankings:

== Roster ==
2012–13 Texas A&M Aggies men's basketball team
Players
Coaches

Pos.	#	Name	Height	Weight	Year	Hometown
F	20	Daniel Alexander	6 ft 9 in (2.06 m)	215 lb (98 kg)	RS Fr	Dripping Springs, Texas
G	24	Alex Baird	6 ft 1 in (1.85 m)	175 lb (79 kg)	Sr	Flower Mound, Texas
G	11	Jamal Branch	6 ft 3 in (1.91 m)	165 lb (75 kg)	Fr	Arlington, Texas
C	4	Keith Davis	6 ft 10 in (2.08 m)	230 lb (104 kg)	So	Dallas, Texas
G	13	Jordan Green	6 ft 4 in (1.93 m)	180 lb (82 kg)	Fr	Flower Mound, Texas
G	5	Dash Harris	6 ft 1 in (1.85 m)	170 lb (77 kg)	Sr	Los Angeles, California
G	2	Naji Hibbert	6 ft 5 in (1.96 m)	195 lb (88 kg)	Jr	Baltimore, Maryland
F	42	Jarod Jahns	6 ft 6 in (1.98 m)	195 lb (88 kg)	Sr	Spring, Texas
F	33	Grant Jolly	6 ft 7 in (2.01 m)	210 lb (95 kg)	Fr	Southlake, Texas
G/F	23	Zach Kinsley	6 ft 5 in (1.96 m)	210 lb (95 kg)	Sr	Baton Rouge, Louisiana
F	10	David Loubeau	6 ft 8 in (2.03 m)	235 lb (107 kg)	Sr	Miami, Florida
G	12	Blake McDonald	5 ft 11 in (1.8 m)	170 lb (77 kg)	Sr	Spring, Texas
F	22	Khris Middleton	6 ft 7 in (2.01 m)	210 lb (95 kg)	Jr	North Charleston, South Carolina
F	32	Kourtney Roberson	6 ft 9 in (2.06 m)	240 lb (109 kg)	So	Arcadia, Louisiana
G	31	Elston Turner	6 ft 5 in (1.96 m)	220 lb (100 kg)	RS Jr	Missouri City, Texas
F	35	Ray Turner	6 ft 9 in (2.06 m)	230 lb (104 kg)	Jr	Houston, Texas

Head coach

- Billy Kennedy (Southeastern Louisiana)

Assistant coach(es)

- Glynn Cyprien
- Kyle Keller
- John Reese

Legend

- (C) Team captain
- (S) Suspended
- (I) Ineligible
- (W) Walk-on
- Injured
- Current redshirt

Roster
Last update: 2011-10-02

== Schedule ==
Date time, TV	Rank^{#}	Opponent^{#}	Result	Record	Site (attendance) city, state
Summer European Tour
08/11/11*; 12:00 p.m.		Swiss National Team	L 51–62		Saint-Leonard; Fribourg, Switzerland
08/12/11*; 9:00 a.m.		Swiss National Team	L 73–85		Saint-Leonard; Fribourg, Switzerland
08/14/11*; 9:00 a.m.		AMW Elite	W 90–61		Halles Georges Carpentier; Paris, France
08/16/11*; 12:30 p.m.		AMW Elite	W 80–78		Halles Georges Carpentier; Paris, France
Exhibition
11/03/11*; 7:00 p.m.	No. 20	Dallas Baptist	W 91–55		Reed Arena (5,472); College Station, TX
Regular season
11/09/11*; 7:00 p.m., FSSW/FSH	No. 20	Liberty; Coaches vs. Cancer Classic	W 81–59	1–0	Reed Arena (6,118); College Station, TX
11/13/11*; 3:00 p.m., FSSW/FSH	No. 20	Southern	W 83–58	2–0	Reed Arena (5,503); College Station, TX
11/17/11*; 6:00 p.m., ESPN2	No. 19	vs. Mississippi State; Coaches vs. Cancer Classic	L 60–69	2–1	Madison Square Garden (9,036); New York, NY
11/18/11*; 4:30 p.m., ESPN2	No. 19	vs. St. John's; Coaches vs. Cancer Classic	W 58–57	3–1	Madison Square Garden (6,338); New York, NY
11/26/11*; 3:00 p.m.	No. 25	Texas A&M–Corpus Christi	W 56–43	4–1	Reed Arena (6,114); College Station, TX
11/30/11*; 7:00 p.m., FSSW/FSH	No. 25	Alcorn State	W 56–44	5–1	Reed Arena (5,315); College Station, TX
12/03/11*; 7:00 p.m.	No. 25	Stephen F. Austin	W 55–42	6–1	Reed Arena (6,465); College Station, TX
12/07/11*; 7:00 p.m., FSSW/FSH	No. 22	Sam Houston State	W 64–37	7–1	Reed Arena (5,431); College Station, TX
12/10/11*; 7:00 p.m.	No. 22	Louisiana–Monroe	W 67–54	8–1	Reed Arena (6,875); College Station, TX
12/17/10*; 3:30 p.m., FSSW/FSH/ Sun Sports	No. 22	vs. No. 13 Florida; Orange Bowl Basketball Classic	L 64–84	8–2	BankAtlantic Center (11,262); Sunrise, FL
12/22/11*; 7:00 p.m., FSSW/FSH		Rice	L 58–65	8–3	Reed Arena (8,284); College Station, TX
12/29/11*; 7:00 p.m.		Arkansas Tech	W 76–58	9–3	Reed Arena (8,519); College Station, TX
01/02/12; 6:00 p.m., ESPNU		at No. 4 Baylor	L 52–61	9–4 (0–1)	Ferrell Center (8,424); Waco, TX
01/07/12; 3:00 p.m., Big 12 Network		Iowa State	L 50–74	9–5 (0–2)	Reed Arena (6,450); College Station, TX
01/11/12; 3:00 p.m., ESPN2		at Texas	L 51–61	9–6 (0–3)	Frank Erwin Center (13,917); Austin, TX
01/14/12; 12:45 p.m., Big 12 Network		Texas Tech	W 67–54	10–6 (1–3)	Reed Arena (7,083); College Station, TX
01/16/12; 4:30 p.m., ESPN		at No. 5 Missouri	L 51–70	10–7 (1–4)	Mizzou Arena (15,061); Columbia, MO
01/21/12; 3:00 p.m., Big 12 Network		Oklahoma	W 81–75	11–7 (2–4)	Reed Arena (8,468); College Station, TX
01/23/12; 8:00 p.m., ESPN		at No. 5 Kansas	L 54-64	11–8 (2–5)	Allen Fieldhouse (16,300); Lawrence, KS
01/28/12; 3:00 p.m., Big 12 Network		Oklahoma State	W 76–61	12–8 (3–5)	Reed Arena (9,027); College Station, TX
02/01/12; 8:00 p.m., ESPN2		No. 6 Baylor	L 60–63	12–9 (3–6)	Reed Arena (9,309); College Station, TX
02/04/12; 3:00 p.m., Big 12 Network		at Kansas State	L 53–64	12–10 (3–7)	Bramlage Coliseum (12,528); Manhattan, KS
02/06/12; 8:00 p.m., ESPN		Texas	L 68–70	12–11 (3–8)	Reed Arena (9,792); College Station, TX
02/11/12; 3:00 p.m., Big 12 Network		at Iowa State	L 46–68	12–12 (3–9)	Hilton Coliseum (14,376); Ames, IA
02/14/12; 6:00 p.m., ESPN2		at Texas Tech	W 47–38	13–12 (4–9)	United Spirit Arena (7,837); Lubbock, TX
02/18/12; 1:00 p.m., ESPN2		No. 3 Missouri	L 62–71	13–13 (4–10)	Reed Arena (11,818); College Station, TX
02/22/12; 8:00 p.m., ESPN2		No. 4 Kansas	L 58-66	13–14 (4–11)	Reed Arena (6,868); College Station, TX
02/25/12; 1:00 p.m., ESPN2		at Oklahoma State	L 42-60	13–15 (4–12)	Gallagher-Iba Arena (12,190); Stillwater, OK
02/28/12; 6:00 p.m., ESPN2		Kansas State	L 60-66	13–16 (4–13)	Reed Arena (8,085); College Station, TX
03/03/12; 3:00 p.m., Big 12 Network		at Oklahoma	L 62–65	13–17 (4–14)	Lloyd Noble Center (6,188); Norman, OK
2012 Big 12 men's basketball tournament
03/07/12; 6:00 p.m., Big 12 Network		vs. Oklahoma; First Round	W 62–53	14–17	Sprint Center (18,972); Kansas City, MO
03/08/12; 2:00 p.m., ESPN2		vs. No. 3 Kansas; Quarterfinals	L 66–83	14–18	Sprint Center (18,972); Kansas City, MO
*Non-conference game. ^{#}Rankings from AP Poll. (#) Tournament seedings in parentheses. All times are in Central Standard Time.
