= 2012 Big 12 men's basketball tournament =

- Classification: Division I
- Season: 2011–12
- Teams: 10
- Site: Sprint Center; Kansas City, Missouri
- Champions: Missouri (2nd title)
- Winning coach: Frank Haith (1st title)
- MVP: Kim English (Missouri)
- Attendance: 94,894 (overall); 19,006 (championship)
- Top scorer: Kim English (Missouri) (69 points)
- Television: ESPN, Big 12 Network, ESPN2

2011–12 Big 12 men's basketball standings
	Conf.				Overall
Team	W		L	PCT	W		L	PCT
No. 6 Kansas	16	–	2	.889	32	–	7	.821
No. 3 Missouri †	14	–	4	.778	30	–	5	.857
Iowa State	12	–	6	.667	23	–	11	.676
No. 9 Baylor	12	–	6	.667	30	–	8	.789
Kansas State	10	–	8	.556	22	–	11	.667
Texas	9	–	9	.500	20	–	14	.588
Oklahoma State	7	–	11	.389	15	–	18	.455
Oklahoma	5	–	13	.278	15	–	16	.484
Texas A&M	4	–	14	.222	14	–	18	.438
Texas Tech	1	–	17	.056	8	–	23	.258
† 2012 Big 12 Tournament winner Rankings from AP poll

The 2012 Phillips 66 Big 12 Men's Basketball Championship was held at the Sprint Center in Kansas City, Missouri from March 7 until March 10, 2012. Due to a major conference realignment that significantly impacted the Big 12, It was the first tournament with 10 teams participating. After the 2010–11 season, Colorado left for the Pac-12 and Nebraska joined the Big Ten. It was also the final appearance in this event for Texas A&M and Missouri before they joined the Southeastern Conference for the 2012–13 season. The conference will continue to have 10 schools in that season, as TCU and West Virginia will join the Big 12, respectively from the Mountain West Conference and Big East Conference.

The tournament, and the automatic bid to the NCAA tournament that went with it, was won by one of the departing members, Missouri.

== Radio Coverage ==
All teams were able to have their local radio media groups carry their games in the Big 12 Tournament. Additionally, the tournament semifinals and championship game were broadcast on select regional ESPN Radio affiliates and nationally on ESPNRadio.com. This was a change from years past, in which ESPN Radio would broadcast the games nationally. However due to the ACC's contract with ESPN now being in effect, ESPN Radio affiliates must choose whether they want to carry the Big 12 semis and championship or carry the entire ACC Tournament.

== Seeding ==
The Tournament consisted of a 10 team single-elimination tournament with the top 6 seeds receiving a bye.

2012 Big 12 Men's Basketball Tournament seeds
Seed	School	Conf.	Over.	Tiebreaker
1	Kansas ‡#	16–2	32–7	
2	Missouri #	14–4	30–5	
3	Iowa State #	12–6	23–11	1–1 vs. BU; 1–1 vs. KU
4	Baylor #	12–6	30–8	1–1 vs. BU; 0–2 vs. KU
5	Kansas State #	10–8	22–11	
6	Texas #	9–9	20–14	
7	Oklahoma State	7–11	15–18	
8	Oklahoma	5–13	15–16	
9	Texas A&M	4–14	14–18	
10	Texas Tech	1–17	8–23	
‡ – Big 12 Conference regular season champions, and tournament No. 1 seed. # – Received a single-bye in the conference tournament. Overall records include all games played in the Big 12 Conference tournament.

== Schedule ==
The semi-finals were produced by, and aired on, the Big 12 Network in Big 12 Network territories. However, they were aired on ESPNU for the rest of the nation. All games were available via streaming through Watch ESPN's ESPN3 except in Big 12 Network territories, where games that did not air on ESPN or ESPN2 were blacked out.

Session	Game	Time	Matchup	Television	Attendance
First Round – Wednesday, March 7
1	1	6:00 pm	#9 Texas A&M 62 vs #8 Oklahoma 53	Big 12 Network	18,972
1	2	8:30 pm	#7 Oklahoma State 76 vs #10 Texas Tech 60	Big 12 Network	18,972
Quarterfinals – Thursday, March 8
2	3	11:30 am	#4 Baylor 82 vs #5 Kansas State 74	ESPN2	18,972
2	4	2:00 pm	#1 Kansas 83 vs #9 Texas A&M 66	ESPN2	18,972
3	5	6:00 pm	#2 Missouri 88 vs #7 Oklahoma State 70	Big 12 Network	18,972
3	6	8:30 pm	#6 Texas 71 vs #3 Iowa State 65	Big 12 Network	18,972
Semifinals – Friday, March 9
4	7	6:30 pm	#4 Baylor 81 vs #1 Kansas 72	Big 12 Network & ESPNU	18,972
4	8	9:00 pm	#2 Missouri 81 vs #6 Texas 67	Big 12 Network & ESPNU	18,972
Final – Saturday, March 10
5	9	5:00 pm	#2 Missouri 90 vs #4 Baylor 75	ESPN	19,006
Game times in CT. #-Rankings denote tournament seed

== Bracket ==
First round March 7, 2012
8	Oklahoma	53
9	Texas A&M	62
7	Oklahoma State	76
10	Texas Tech	60

Quarterfinals; March 8, 2012
1	#3 Kansas	83
9	Texas A&M	66
4	#12 Baylor	82
5	Kansas State	74
3	#25 Iowa State	65
6	Texas	71
2	#5 Missouri	88
7	Oklahoma State	70

Semifinals; March 9, 2012
1	#3 Kansas	72
4	#12 Baylor	81
6	Texas	75
2	#5 Missouri	89

Championship Game; March 10, 2012
4	#12 Baylor	75
2	#5 Missouri	90

All Times Central

== Game summaries ==
Big 12 Network

Mar 7
6:00 pm

Recap

Oklahoma Sooners 53, Texas A&M Aggies 62
Scoring by half: 22–27, 31–35
Pts: Romero Osby 17; Rebs: Cameron Clark 8 Asts: Sam Grooms 4	Pts: 2 tied with 15; Rebs: David Loubeau 9 Asts: Khris Middleton 4

Sprint Center
Kansas City, MO
Attendance: 18,972
Referees: Tom Eades, Doug Sirmons, Joe DeRosa

Big 12 Network

Mar 7
8:30 pm

Recap

Oklahoma State Cowboys 76, Texas Tech Red Raiders 60
Scoring by half: 32–27, 44–33
Pts: Keiton Page 20; Rebs: Michael Cobbins 8 Asts: Keiton Page 5	Pts: Jordan Tolbert 16; Rebs: Jaye Crockett 11; Asts: 2 tied with 3

Sprint Center
Kansas City, MO
Attendance: 18,972
Referees: Mark Whitehead, Gerry Pollard, Don Daily

ESPN2

Mar 8
11:30 am

Recap

#12 Baylor Bears 82, Kansas State Wildcats 74
Scoring by half: 45–36, 37–38
Pts: Perry Jones III 31; Rebs: Perry Jones III 11; Asts: Pierre Jackson 8	Pts: Jordan Henriquez 22; Rebs: Jordan Henriquez 14; Asts: Will Spradling 5

Sprint Center
Kansas City, MO
Attendance: 18,972
Referees: Gerry Pollard, Doug Sirmons, John Higgins

ESPN2

Mar 8
2:00 pm

Recap

#3 Kansas Jayhawks 83, Texas A&M Aggies 66
Scoring by half: 40–28, 43–38
Pts: Elijah Johnson 26; Rebs: Thomas Robinson 10; Asts: 3 tied with 4	Pts: Khris Middleton 24; Rebs: Ray Turner 8 Asts: Khris Middleton 3

Sprint Center
Kansas City, MO
Attendance: 18,972
Referees: Mark Whitehead, Paul Janssen, Randy Heimerman

Big 12 Network

Mar 8
6:00 pm

Recap

#5 Missouri Tigers 88, Oklahoma State Cowboys 70
Scoring by half: 49–24, 39–46
Pts: Kim English 27; Rebs: Marcus Denmon 8 Asts: Phil Pressey 12	Pts: Keiton Page 22; Rebs: Brian Williams 8 Asts: Markel Brown 6

Sprint Center
Kansas City, MO
Attendance: 18,972
Referees: Mike Stuart, Rod Dixon, Don Dailey

Big 12 Network

Mar 8
8:30 pm

Recap

#25 Iowa State Cyclones 65, Texas Longhorns 71
Scoring by half: 29–25, 36–46
Pts: Royce White 17; Rebs: Royce White 10; Asts: 2 tied with 4	Pts: J'Covan Brown 24; Rebs: Clint Chapman 8 Asts: Myck Kabongo 5

Sprint Center
Kansas City, MO
Attendance: 18,972
Referees: Joe DeRosa, Tom Eades, Keith Kimble

Big 12 Network
ESPNU

Mar 9
6:30 pm

Recap

#12 Baylor Bears 81, #3 Kansas Jayhawks 72
Scoring by half: 43–35, 38–37
Pts: Perry Jones III 18; Rebs: Quincy Miller 8 Asts: Pierre Jackson 7	Pts: Tyshawn Taylor 20; Rebs: Thomas Robinson 9 Asts: 2 tied with 3

Sprint Center
Kansas City, MO
Attendance: 18,972
Referees: Mark Whitehead, Mike Stuart, Gerry Pollard

Big 12 Network
ESPNU

Mar 9
9:00 pm

Recap

#5 Missouri Tigers 81, Texas Longhorns 67
Scoring by half: 39–32, 42–35
Pts: 2 tied with 23; Rebs: Ricardo Ratliffe 15; Asts: Phil Pressey 4	Pts: J'Covan Brown 21; Rebs: 3 tied with 8 Asts: Myck Kabongo 5

Sprint Center
Kansas City, MO
Attendance: 18,972
Referees: John Higgins, Tom Eades, Doug Sirmons

ESPN

Mar 10
5:00 pm

Recap

#12 Baylor Bears 75, #5 Missouri Tigers 90
Scoring by half: 37–43, 38–47
Pts: Perry Jones III 16; Rebs: Perry Jones III 11; Asts: Pierre Jackson 6	Pts: Kim English 19; Rebs: Kim English 6 Asts: Phil Pressey 8

Sprint Center
Kansas City, MO
Attendance: 19,006
Referees: John Higgins, Joe DeRosa, Mike Stuart

== All-Tournament Team ==
Most Outstanding Player – Kim English, Missouri

Player	Team	Position	Class
Kim English	Missouri	Sr.	G
Perry Jones III	Baylor	So.	F
Brady Heslip	Baylor	So.	G
Phil Pressey	Missouri	So.	G
J’Covan Brown	Texas	Jr.	G

== See also ==
- 2012 Big 12 Conference women's basketball tournament
- 2012 NCAA Division I men's basketball tournament
- 2011–12 NCAA Division I men's basketball rankings
