= Texas Tech Sports Network =

Collegiate sports radio network

- Type: Radio network
- Branding: TTSN
- Country: United States
- Availability: AM/FM through local affiliates
- Area: New Mexico, Texas
- Owner: Learfield Communications, Inc.

Texas Tech Sports Network (TTSN) is a radio network in United States dedicated to live broadcasting and live programming relating to the Texas Tech Red Raiders. It is managed by Red Raider Sports Properties, a property of Learfield Communications, Inc., which manages the multimedia rights for Texas Tech University. Texas Tech Sports Network's flagship stations are KTTU, KTTU-FM, and KLBB-FM of Lubbock, Texas.

During basketball and baseball season, Texas Tech Sports Network also produces men's and women's basketball games which would not be shown on local television otherwise. Men's basketball games are typically shown simulcast by ESPN3.

Texas Tech Sports Network consists of 40 affiliates, mainly of local radio affiliates within Texas and eastern New Mexico. Some stations with local interest broadcast football or basketball.
