= Scott Christopherson =

American basketball player

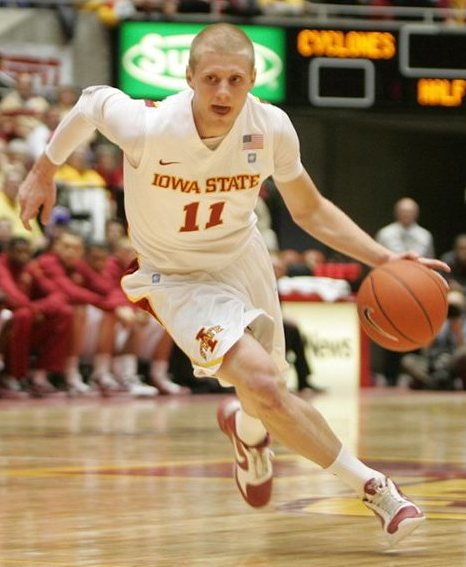
- Christopherson with the Iowa State Cyclones in 2011

Personal information
- Born: May 17, 1989 (age 37) La Crosse, Wisconsin, U.S.
- Listed height: 6 ft 3 in (1.91 m)
- Listed weight: 195 lb (88 kg)

Career information
- High school: Melrose-Mindaro (Melrose, Wisconsin); Aquinas (La Crosse, Wisconsin)
- College: Marquette (2007–2008); Iowa State (2009–2012)
- NBA draft: 2012: undrafted
- Playing career: 2012–2013
- Position: Guard

Career history
- 2012: Tsmoki-Minsk
- 2013: Adelaide 36ers
- 2013: Boncourt

Career highlights
- Third-team All-Big 12 (2012); Wisconsin Co-Mr. Basketball (2007)

Scott Christopherson (born May 17, 1989) is an American former professional basketball player. He played college basketball for the Marquette Golden Eagles and the Iowa State Cyclones. Christopherson played professionally in Belarus, Australia and Switzerland.

== High school career ==
Christopherson began his high school career at Melrose-Mindoro High School for his first two years but came to prominence at Aquinas High School, where he was named Wisconsin Mr. Basketball during his senior season. He committed to play for the Marquette Golden Eagles before his sophomore season when he was recruited by head coach Tom Crean.

== College career ==
The start of Christopherson's college basketball career was hampered when he underwent knee surgery in November 2007, and he averaged just 1.3 points per game in 18 games played during his freshman season. Christopherson elected to transfer when Crean left to become head coach of the Indiana Hoosiers in April 2008. Christopherson announced he was considering recruiting trips to multiple schools but chose to transfer to the Iowa State Cyclones after just one visit. Christopherson sat out the 2008–09 season and resumed his eligibility during the 2009–10 season.

Christopherson emerged as one of the top shooters in the Big 12 Conference during his junior season in 2010–11, where he ranked third best for total three-point field goals made in the conference. His form continued into his senior season where he ranked second on the team in scoring with 12.6 points per game and second in the Big 12 in three-point percentage with 45.6%. Christoperson also ranked third in the nation in free-throw percentage with 90.3%. He earned third-team All-Big 12 honors in 2012. Christopherson's college goal was to lead the Cyclones to the NCAA Division I men's basketball tournament, which he accomplished in his senior season when he took the Cyclones to the Round of 32 in the 2012 NCAA tournament where they lost to the eventual champion Kentucky Wildcats.

== Professional career ==
Christopherson began his professional career when he signed with Tsmoki-Minsk of the Belarusian Premier League on August 3, 2012. Christopherson left the team in December 2012 to sign with the Adelaide 36ers of the Australian National Basketball League as an injury replacement for C. J. Massingale. He averaged 2.9 points and 2.0 rebounds per game in limited minutes as he had become an afterthought in head coach Marty Clarke's rotation by the end of the season. Writer Boti Nagy named Christopherson as the 36ers' all-time worst import. Christopherson signed with Boncourt of the Swiss Basketball League on August 24, 2013. He left the team on December 21, 2013.

== Post-playing career ==
As he considered his overseas career over, Christopherson returned to the United States and relocated to Chicago, where he credited his new-found anonymity as important in reestablishing himself. In 2017, he moved to Minneapolis and worked on attaining his real estate license while pursuing other business interests.
