= 2011–12 Texas State Bobcats men's basketball team =

American college basketball season

2011–12 Texas State Bobcats men's basketball
- Conference: Southland Conference
- West Division
- Record: 13–17 (5–11 Southland)
- Head coach: Doug Davalos (5th season)
- Assistant coaches: Rob Flaska; Eric Brand; Jason Burton
- Home arena: Strahan Coliseum

2011–12 Southland Conference men's basketball standings
	Conf.				Overall
Team	W		L	PCT	W		L	PCT
East
Lamar†	11	–	5	.688	23	–	12	.657
McNeese State	10	–	6	.625	17	–	16	.515
Northwestern State	8	–	8	.500	16	–	16	.500
Nicholls State	6	–	10	.375	10	–	20	.333
Southeastern Louisiana	5	–	11	.313	12	–	17	.414
Central Arkansas	3	–	13	.188	8	–	21	.276
West
Texas–Arlington	15	–	1	.938	24	–	9	.727
Stephen F. Austin	12	–	4	.750	20	–	12	.625
UTSA	10	–	6	.625	18	–	14	.563
Sam Houston State	7	–	9	.438	13	–	19	.406
Texas State	5	–	11	.313	13	–	17	.433
Texas A&M–Corpus Christi	4	–	12	.250	6	–	24	.200
† 2012 Southland tournament winner As of March 14, 2012; Rankings from AP poll

The 2011–12 Texas State Bobcats men's basketball team represented Texas State University during the 2011–12 NCAA Division I men's basketball season. The Bobcats, led by fifth year head coach Doug Davalos, played their home games at the Strahan Coliseum and were members of the West Division of the Southland Conference. They finished the season 13–17, 5–11 in Southland play to finish in fifth place in the Southland West Division. They failed to qualify for the Southland Basketball tournament.

This was the Bobcats final season as members of the Southland Conference as they moved to the WAC on July 1, 2012.

== Media ==
All Bobcats games air on KTSW. Video streaming of all Texas State Bobcats home games can be watched online at http://www.txstatebobcats.com/showcase.

== Roster ==
2011–12 Texas State Bobcats men's basketball team
Players
Coaches

Pos.	#	Name	Height	Weight	Year	Previous school	Hometown
G	0	Jordan Kirschke	5 ft 11 in (1.8 m)	170 lb (77 kg)	Jr	Wharton	Hungerford, TX
G	1	Vonn Jones	5 ft 11 in (1.8 m)	165 lb (75 kg)	Jr	Hartland; Lamar State-PA	Hartland, MI
F	2	Brooks Ybarra	6 ft 5 in (1.96 m)	195 lb (88 kg)	Sr	Barbers Hill; Lamar	Mont Belvieu, TX
F	3	Reid Koenen	6 ft 7 in (2.01 m)	200 lb (91 kg)	So	Prairie	Racine, WI
G	5	John Bowman	6 ft 4 in (1.93 m)	202 lb (92 kg)	Sr	Horn	Mesquite, TX
G	10	Wesley Davis	6 ft 3 in (1.91 m)	185 lb (84 kg)	Fr	Mansfield Summit	Arlington, TX
G	11	Eddie Rios	6 ft 0 in (1.83 m)	190 lb (86 kg)	Sr	Miami Senior; Miami (FL)	Miami, FL
G	15	Travis Jones	6 ft 5 in (1.96 m)	205 lb (93 kg)	Sr	Georgetown; Lon Morris	Georgetown, TX
F	20	Dante Bachus	6 ft 7 in (2.01 m)	230 lb (104 kg)	Fr	Sam Houston	Houston, TX
F	21	Matt Staff	6 ft 10 in (2.08 m)	235 lb (107 kg)	Jr	Memorial; New Mexico	Houston, TX
F	22	Basil Brown	6 ft 5 in (1.96 m)	195 lb (88 kg)	RS Fr	Richardson Berkner	Dallas, TX
G	23	Xavier Dade	6 ft 0 in (1.83 m)	185 lb (84 kg)	Fr	Dallas Lincoln	Dallas, TX
F	30	Gordon Ball	6 ft 8 in (2.03 m)	240 lb (109 kg)	Jr	Elkins; Lamar State-PA	Houston, TX
F	32	Jeremy Hinton	6 ft 6 in (1.98 m)	250 lb (113 kg)	Sr	Frisco; South Plains	Frisco, TX
F	44	Nick Hinton	6 ft 9 in (2.06 m)	225 lb (102 kg)	RS Fr	Wakeland	Frisco, TX

Head coach

- Doug Davalos (Houston)

Assistant coach(es)

- Rob Flaska (Michigan Tech)
- Eric Brand (Bethel (IN))
- Jason Burton (Austin College)

Legend

- (C) Team captain
- (S) Suspended
- (I) Ineligible
- (W) Walk-on
- Injured
- Current redshirt

== Schedule and results ==
- All times are Central

Date time, TV	Rank^{#}	Opponent^{#}	Result	Record	Site (attendance) city, state
Regular season
November 11, 2011*; 7:30 pm		Texas Lutheran	W 101–60	1–0	Strahan Coliseum (2,541); San Marcos, TX
November 15, 2011*; 7:00 pm		Howard Payne	W 96–55	2–0	Strahan Coliseum (1,629); San Marcos, TX
November 18, 2011*; 4:30 pm		vs. Toledo; UTPA Tip-Off Classic	W 94–91	3–0	UTPA Fieldhouse (142); Edinburg, TX
November 19, 2011*; 7:00 pm		at Texas–Pan American; UTPA Tip-Off Classic	L 77–79	3–1	UTPA Fieldhouse (347); Edinburg, TX
November 20, 2011*; 4:30 pm		vs. USC Upstate; UTPA Tip-Off Classic	L 74–82	3–2	UTPA Fieldhouse (231); Edinburg, TX
November 27, 2011*; 4:00 pm		Northwestern Oklahoma State	W 74–72	4–2	Strahan Coliseum (1,046); San Marcos, TX
December 3, 2011*; 4:00 pm		Houston Baptist	W 103–76	5–2	Strahan Coliseum (1,352); San Marcos, TX
December 6, 2011*; 6:00 pm		Houston	W 81–78	6–2	Strahan Coliseum (3,527); San Marcos, TX
December 10, 2011*; 7:15 pm, Longhorn Network		at Texas	L 52–86	6–3	Erwin Center (9,356); Austin, TX
December 20, 2011*; 6:00 pm		at Long Island	L 84–100	6–4	Athletic, Recreation & Wellness Center (519); Brooklyn, NY
December 22, 2011*; 6:00 pm		at Fordham	L 70–81	6–5	Rose Hill Gymnasium (921); Bronx, NY
December 28, 2011*; 7:30 pm		Huston–Tillotson	W 99–47	7–5	Strahan Coliseum (1,168); San Marcos, TX
December 30, 2011*; 8:00 pm, CSS		at Houston	L 71–94	7–6	Hofheinz Pavilion (3,081); Houston, TX
January 4, 2012; 7:00 pm		Stephen F. Austin	L 65–66	7–7 (0–1)	Strahan Coliseum (1,109); San Marcos, TX
January 7, 2012; 2:00 pm		at Northwestern State	L 68–83	7–8 (0–2)	Prather Coliseum (804); Natchitoches, LA
January 14, 2012; 4:00 pm		McNeese State	W 82–73	8–8 (1–2)	Strahan Coliseum (1,194); San Marcos, TX
January 18, 2012; 7:00 pm		at Sam Houston State	L 68–71	8–9 (1–3)	Bernard Johnson Coliseum (1,355); Huntsville, TX
January 21, 2012; 4:00 pm		UTSA; I-35 Rivalry	L 75–80	8–10 (1–4)	Strahan Coliseum (4,458); San Marcos, TX
January 25, 2012; 7:00 pm		at Texas A&M–Corpus Christi	L 68–74	8–11 (1–5)	American Bank Center (1,528); Corpus Christi, TX
January 28, 2012; 4:00 pm		Texas–Arlington	L 79–82	8–12 (1–6)	Strahan Coliseum (2,259); San Marcos, TX
February 1, 2012; 7:00 pm		at Stephen F. Austin	L 63–71	8–13 (1–7)	William R. Johnson Coliseum (1,103); Nacogdoches, TX
February 4, 2012; 3:30 pm		at Nicholls State; The Battle for the Paddle	L 75–96	8–14 (1–8)	Stopher Gym (655); Thibodaux, La.
February 8, 2012; 7:00 pm		Central Arkansas	W 94–63	9–14 (2–8)	Strahan Coliseum (1,781); San Marcos, TX
February 11, 2012; 7:00 pm		at Texas–Arlington	L 53–73	9–15 (2–9)	College Park Center (5,272); Arlington, TX
February 15, 2012; 7:00 pm		Texas A&M–Corpus Christi	W 79–61	10–15 (3–9)	Strahan Coliseum (1,973); San Marcos, TX
February 18, 2012*; 7:00 pm		at South Dakota; ESPN BracketBusters	W 93–92	11–15	DakotaDome (1,629); Vermillion, SD
February 22, 2012; 7:00 pm, SLC TV		at Southeast Louisiana	W 62–61	12–15 (4–9)	University Center (630); Hammond, LA
February 25, 2012; 4:00 pm		at UTSA; I-35 Rivalry	W 66–52	13–15 (5–9)	Convocation Center (2,895); San Antonio, TX
February 29, 2012; 7:00 pm		Lamar	L 65–81	13–16 (5–10)	Strahan Coliseum (1,946); San Marcos, TX
March 3, 2012; 4:00 pm		Sam Houston State	L 61–63	13–17 (5–11)	Strahan Coliseum (2,300); San Marcos, TX
*Non-conference game. ^{#}Rankings from AP Poll. (#) Tournament seedings in parentheses.
