= 2011–12 Texas–Arlington Mavericks men's basketball team =

American college basketball season

2011–12 Texas–Arlington Mavericks men's basketball

Southland West Division Champions

NIT, First Round
- Conference: Southland Conference
- West Division
- Record: 24–9 (15–1 Southland)
- Head coach: Scott Cross (6th season)
- Assistant coaches: Greg Young; Derrick Daniels; Zak Buncik
- Home arena: Texas Hall; College Park Center

2011–12 Southland Conference men's basketball standings
	Conf.				Overall
Team	W		L	PCT	W		L	PCT
East
Lamar†	11	–	5	.688	23	–	12	.657
McNeese State	10	–	6	.625	17	–	16	.515
Northwestern State	8	–	8	.500	16	–	16	.500
Nicholls State	6	–	10	.375	10	–	20	.333
Southeastern Louisiana	5	–	11	.313	12	–	17	.414
Central Arkansas	3	–	13	.188	8	–	21	.276
West
Texas–Arlington	15	–	1	.938	24	–	9	.727
Stephen F. Austin	12	–	4	.750	20	–	12	.625
UTSA	10	–	6	.625	18	–	14	.563
Sam Houston State	7	–	9	.438	13	–	19	.406
Texas State	5	–	11	.313	13	–	17	.433
Texas A&M–Corpus Christi	4	–	12	.250	6	–	24	.200
† 2012 Southland tournament winner As of March 14, 2012; Rankings from AP poll

The 2011–12 Texas–Arlington Mavericks men's basketball team represented the University of Texas at Arlington during the 2011–12 NCAA Division I men's basketball season. The Mavericks, led by sixth year head coach Scott Cross, played their home games at Texas Hall until the completion of the brand new College Park Center in February and are members of the West Division of the Southland Conference. The Mavericks were Southland West Division Champions and overall regular season champions but failed to win the Southland Basketball tournament after falling in the semifinals to McNeese State. As regular season champions, they received an automatic bid into the 2012 National Invitation Tournament where they lost in the first round to Washington. The 24 wins was the most wins in program history.

This was the Mavericks' final year as a member of the Southland Conference, as they joined the Western Athletic Conference on July 1, 2012.

== Roster ==
Number	Name	Position	Height	Weight	Year	Hometown
1	Bo Ingram	Forward	6–5	195	Senior	Kinston, North Carolina
2	Luke Davis	Guard	6–1	160	Freshman	Lubbock, Texas
3	Jamel Outler	Guard	6–2	180	Sophomore	Houston, Texas
4	Jorge Redmon	Guard	5–9	160	Junior	Arlington, Texas
5	Stuart Lagerson	Center	7–0	210	Sophomore	Converse, Texas
10	Bradley Gay	Guard	6–4	185	Senior	Missouri City, Texas
12	Shaquille White-Miller	Guard	5–9	165	Sophomore	Port Arthur, Texas
15	Nicholaus Osbourne	Guard	6–0	200	Sophomore	Houston, Texas
24	Kevin Butler	Forward	6–5	210	Junior	Duncanville, Texas
25	Cameron Catlett	Guard	6–3	185	Junior	San Antonio, Texas
31	LaMarcus Reed III	Forward	6–5	185	Senior	Dallas, Texas
33	Karol Gruszecki	Forward	6–5	195	Junior	Łódź, Poland
35	Brandon Edwards	Forward	6–6	210	Sophomore	Fort Worth, Texas
55	Jordan Reves	Forward	6–10	240	Junior	Jeffersontown, Kentucky

== Media ==
All UT-Arlington games are broadcast by KVCE.

== Schedule ==
Date time, TV	Rank^{#}	Opponent^{#}	Result	Record	Site (attendance) city, state
Regular season
11/14/2011*; 7:00 pm		at East Texas Baptist	W 99–64	1–0	Texas Hall (688); Arlington, TX
11/19/2011*; 7:00 pm		Louisiana Tech	W 68–61	2–0	Texas Hall (955); Arlington, TX
11/22/2011*; 7:00 pm		North Texas	W 97–64	3–0	Texas Hall (1,388); Arlington, TX
11/23/2011*; 7:00 pm, FS Southwest		at No. 9 Baylor	L 65–75	3–1	Ferrell Center (5,988); Waco, TX
11/26/2011*; 7:00 pm		at Samford	L 69–71	3–2	Texas Hall (697); Arlington, TX
11/28/2011*; 7:00 pm		Texas–Pan American	W 92–60	4–2	Texas Hall (440); Arlington, TX
12/06/2011*; 7:00 pm, Longhorn Network		at Texas	L 62–80	4–3	Frank Erwin Center (9,202); Austin, TX
12/17/2011*; 6:00 pm		at Tulsa	L 75–80 ^{OT}	4–4	Reynolds Center (3,892); Tulsa, OK
12/20/2011*; 9:00 pm		at Utah State; Athletes in Action Classic	L 69–73	4–5	Smith Spectrum (9,666); Logan, UT
12/21/2011*; 6:30 pm		vs. Kent State; Athletes in Action Classic	W 74–73	5–5	Smith Spectrum (959); Logan, UT
12/22/2011*; 6:30 pm		vs. Saint Peter's; Athletes in Action Classic	W 73–68	6–5	Smith Spectrum (941); Logan, UT
12/29/2011*; 7:00 pm		at Texas–Pan American	W 83–56	7–5	UTPA Fieldhouse (476); Edinburg, TX
01/04/2012; 7:00 pm		Southeastern Louisiana	W 85–46	8–5 (1–0)	Texas Hall (578); Arlington, TX
01/07/2012; 7:00 pm		Nicholls	W 85–55	9–5 (2–0)	Texas Hall (679); Arlington, TX
01/11/2012; 7:00 pm		Sam Houston State	W 66–40	10–5 (3–0)	Texas Hall (705); Arlington, TX
01/14/2012; 2:00 pm		at Lamar	W 91–82	11–5 (4–0)	Montagne Center (2,466); Beaumont, TX
01/18/2012; 7:00 pm		at Texas A&M–Corpus Christi	W 77–73	12–5 (5–0)	American Bank Center (840); Corpus Christi, TX
01/21/2012; 7:00 pm		Stephen F. Austin	W 63–54	13–5 (6–0)	Texas Hall (1,262); Arlington, TX
01/24/2012*; 7:00 pm		at Houston Baptist	W 79–74	14–5	Sharp Gymnasium (489); Houston, TX
01/28/2012; 4:00 pm		at Texas State	W 82–79	15–5 (7–0)	Strahan Coliseum (2,259); San Marcos, TX
02/01/2012; 7:00 pm		UTSA	W 67–66	16–5 (8–0)	College Park Center (6,228); Arlington, TX
02/04/2012; 4:00 pm		at Central Arkansas	W 69–61	17–5 (9–0)	Farris Center (1,017); Conway, AR
02/08/2012; 7:00 pm, SLC TV		at Sam Houston State	W 75–63	18–5 (10–0)	Bernard Johnson Coliseum (1,601); Huntsville, TX
02/11/2012; 7:00 pm		Texas State; Homecoming	W 73–53	19–5 (11–0)	College Park Center (5,272); Arlington, TX
02/15/2012; 7:00 pm		at Stephen F. Austin	W 51–47	20–5 (12–0)	William R. Johnson Coliseum (NA); Nacogdoches, TX
02/18/2012*; 7:00 pm, ESPN3		at Weber State; ESPN BracketBusters	L 70–72	20–6	Dee Events Center (8,952); Ogden, UT
02/22/2012; 7:00 pm		at McNeese State	W 93–89	21–6 (13–0)	Burton Coliseum (1,547); Lake Charles, LA
02/25/2012; 7:00 pm		Northwestern State	W 79–70	22–6 (14–0)	College Park Center (4,707); Arlington, TX
02/29/2012; 7:00 pm		Texas A&M–Corpus Christi	W 78–64	23–6 (15–0)	College Park Center (4,109); Arlington, TX
03/03/2012; 6:00 pm		at UTSA	L 88–97	23–7 (15–1)	Convocation Center (2,611); San Antonio, TX
Southland Tournament
03/07/2012; 6:00 pm, SLC Now		vs. Nicholls State; Quarterfinals	W 96–48	24–7	Leonard E. Merrell Center (N/A); Katy, TX
03/08/2012; 8:30 pm, SLC TV		vs. McNeese State; Semifinals	L 72–92	24–8	Leonard E. Merrell Center (1,829); Katy, TX
NIT
03/13/2012*; 8:00 pm, ESPNU		at Washington; First Round	L 72–82	24–9	Alaska Airlines Arena (2,801); Seattle, WA
*Non-conference game. ^{#}Rankings from AP Poll. (#) Tournament seedings in parentheses. All times are in Central Time.
