= 2011–12 Stephen F. Austin Lumberjacks basketball team =

American college basketball season

2011–12 Stephen F. Austin Lumberjacks men's basketball
- Conference: Southland Conference
- West
- Record: 20–12 (12–4 Southland)
- Head coach: Danny Kaspar (12th season)
- Assistant coaches: Brette Tanner; Cinco Boone; Nick Shaw
- Home arena: William R. Johnson Coliseum

2011–12 Southland Conference men's basketball standings
	Conf.				Overall
Team	W		L	PCT	W		L	PCT
East
Lamar†	11	–	5	.688	23	–	12	.657
McNeese State	10	–	6	.625	17	–	16	.515
Northwestern State	8	–	8	.500	16	–	16	.500
Nicholls State	6	–	10	.375	10	–	20	.333
Southeastern Louisiana	5	–	11	.313	12	–	17	.414
Central Arkansas	3	–	13	.188	8	–	21	.276
West
Texas–Arlington	15	–	1	.938	24	–	9	.727
Stephen F. Austin	12	–	4	.750	20	–	12	.625
UTSA	10	–	6	.625	18	–	14	.563
Sam Houston State	7	–	9	.438	13	–	19	.406
Texas State	5	–	11	.313	13	–	17	.433
Texas A&M–Corpus Christi	4	–	12	.250	6	–	24	.200
† 2012 Southland tournament winner As of March 14, 2012; Rankings from AP poll

The 2011–12 Stephen F. Austin Lumberjacks basketball team represented Stephen F. Austin University in the 2011–12 men's college basketball season. This was head coach Danny Kaspar's twelfth season at SFA. The Lumberjacks play their home games at the William R. Johnson Coliseum. They are members of the West Division of the Southland Conference. They finished the season 20–12, 12–4 in Southland play to finish in second place in the West Division. They lost in the semifinals of the Southland Basketball tournament to Lamar. Despite having 20 wins, they did not participate in a post season tournament.

== Roster ==
2011–12 Stephen F. Austin Lumberjacks men's basketball team
Players
Coaches

Pos.	#	Name	Height	Weight	Year	Previous school	Hometown
PG	4	Hal Bateman	5 ft 11 in (1.8 m)	170 lb (77 kg)	Jr	Des Moines Area CC	Davenport, IA
SG	5	Antonio Bostic	6 ft 2 in (1.88 m)	175 lb (79 kg)	Jr	Neosho County CC	Shawnee, KS
F	15	Joe Bright	6 ft 4 in (1.93 m)	205 lb (93 kg)	Jr	Howard College	Minneapolis, MN
C	42	Nick Cates	6 ft 10 in (2.08 m)	240 lb (109 kg)	Fr	Kennedale	Kennedale, TX
G	1	Micah Delph	5 ft 11 in (1.8 m)	170 lb (77 kg)	Fr	Conway	Conway, AR
PG	24	Darius Gardner	5 ft 9 in (1.75 m)	165 lb (75 kg)	So	Yates	Houston, TX
SG	25	Desmond Haymon	6 ft 3 in (1.91 m)	190 lb (86 kg)	So	Williams-Sullivan	Durant, MS
F	23	Jonathan King	6 ft 5 in (1.96 m)	215 lb (98 kg)	Jr	East Mississippi CC	Panama City
F	34	Jacob Parker	6 ft 6 in (1.98 m)	210 lb (95 kg)	Fr	Bixby	Bixby, OK
C	55	Jereal Scott	6 ft 7 in (2.01 m)	230 lb (104 kg)	Sr	La Porte	Houston, TX
F	32	Taylor Smith	6 ft 6 in (1.98 m)	215 lb (98 kg)	Jr	McLennan	Schertz, TX
SG	12	Thomas Walkup	6 ft 4 in (1.93 m)	195 lb (88 kg)	Fr	Deer Park	Pasadena, TX
F	20	Mark Walton	6 ft 7 in (2.01 m)	220 lb (100 kg)	RS Jr	Texas A&M International	Houston, TX

Head coach

- Danny Kaspar (North Texas)

Assistant coach(es)

- Brette Tanner (Emporia State)
- Cinco Boone (Eastern New Mexico)
- Nick Shaw (Stephen F. Austin)

Legend

- (C) Team captain
- (S) Suspended
- (I) Ineligible
- (W) Walk-on
- Injured
- Current redshirt

== Schedule and results ==
- All times are Central

Date time, TV	Rank^{#}	Opponent^{#}	Result	Record	Site (attendance) city, state
Regular season
11/11/2011*; 7:00pm		Centenary	W 84–43	1–0	William R. Johnson Coliseum (2,945); Nacogdoches, TX
11/14/2011*; 9:00pm		at San Diego	L 61–66	1–1	Jenny Craig Pavilion (2,023); San Diego, CA
11/20/2011*; 2:00pm, TTSN/FSSW/ESPN3		at Texas Tech	L 54–66	1–2	United Spirit Arena (9,420); Lubbock, TX
11/26/2011*; 8:00pm		at UTEP	W 53–35	2–2	Don Haskins Center (6,709); El Paso, TX
11/30/2011*; 7:00pm		Wiley College	W 72–66	3–2	William R. Johnson Coliseum (1,437); Nacogdoches, TX
12/03/2011*; 7:00pm		at No. 25 Texas A&M	L 42–55	3–3	Reed Arena (6,465); College Station, TX
12/10/2011*; 4:15pm		Alabama State; Lumberjack E-Tech Classic	W 74–48	4–3	William R. Johnson Coliseum (2,247); Nacogdoches, TX
12/11/2011*; 4:15pm		Florida International; Lumberjack E-Tech Classic	L 56–58	4–4	William R. Johnson Coliseum (2,525); Nacogdoches, TX
12/17/2011*; 8:00pm		Texas College	W 64–57	5–4	William R. Johnson Coliseum (1,001); Nacogdoches, TX
12/20/2011*; 6:30pm		vs. Prairie View A&M; Global Sports Hoops Showcase	L 50–53	5–5	Matthew Knight Arena (N/A); Eugene, OR
12/21/2011*; 6:30pm		vs. North Carolina Central; Global Sports Hoops Showcase	L 57–65	5–6	Matthew Knight Arena (N/A); Eugene, OR
12/22/2011*; 9:00pm		at Oregon; Global Sports Hoops Showcase	L 45–55	5–7	Matthew Knight Arena (3,401); Eugene, OR
12/30/2011*; 7:00pm		UT Tyler	W 93–57	6–7	William R. Johnson Coliseum (1,013); Nacogdoches, TX
01/04/2012; 7:00pm		at Texas State	W 66–65	7–7 (1–0)	Strahan Coliseum (1,109); San Marcos, TX
01/07/2012; 6:00pm		Southeastern Louisiana	W 63–36	8–7 (2–0)	William R. Johnson Coliseum (1,447); Nacogdoches, TX
01/11/2012; 7:00pm, SLC TV		at Central Arkansas	W 67–56	9–7 (3–0)	Farris Center (1,679); Conway, AR
01/14/2012; 6:00 pm		UTSA	L 52–59	9–8 (3–1)	William R. Johnson Coliseum (1,717); Nacogdoches, TX
01/21/2012; 7:00 pm		at Texas–Arlington	L 54–63	9–9 (3–2)	Texas Hall (1,262); Arlington, TX
01/25/2012; 7:00 pm, SLC TV		Sam Houston State; Battle of the Piney Woods	W 67–66 ^{OT}	10–9 (4–2)	William R. Johnson Coliseum (3,853); Nacogdoches, TX
01/28/2012; 7:00 pm		at Texas A&M–Corpus Christi	W 64–49	11–9 (5–2)	American Bank Center (2,327); Corpus Christi, TX
02/01/2012; 7:00 pm		Texas State	W 71–63	12–9 (6–2)	William R. Johnson Coliseum (1,103); Nacogdoches, TX
02/05/2012; 3:00 pm		at McNeese State	L 56–66	12–10 (6–3)	Burton Coliseum (858); Lake Charles, LA
02/08/2012; 7:00 pm		Nicholls State	W 62–58 ^{OT}	13–10 (7–3)	William R. Johnson Coliseum (1,192); Nacogdoches, TX
02/11/2012; 4:00 pm, Texas Channel		at UTSA	W 59–51	14–10 (8–3)	Convocation Center (1,846); San Antonio, TX
02/15/2012; 7:00 pm		Texas–Arlington	L 47–51	14–11 (8–4)	William R. Johnson Coliseum (2,101); Nacogdoches, TX
02/18/2012*; 6:00 pm		High Point; ESPN BracketBusters	W 69–62	15–11	William R. Johnson Coliseum (1,517); Nacogdoches, TX
02/22/2012; 7:00 pm		at Lamar	W 62–52	16–11 (9–4)	Montagne Center (3,037); Beaumont, TX
02/25/2012; 6:00 pm		Texas A&M–Corpus Christi	W 74–41	17–11 (10–4)	William R. Johnson Coliseum (1,909); Nacogdoches, TX
02/29/2012; 7:00 pm		at Sam Houston State; Battle of the Piney Woods	W 58–47	18–11 (11–4)	Bernard Johnson Coliseum (1,857); Huntsville, TX
03/03/2012; 6:00 pm		Northwestern State	W 62–52	19–11 (12–4)	William R. Johnson Coliseum (2,091); Nacogdoches, TX
2012 Southland Conference men's basketball tournament
03/07/2012; 12:00 pm, SLC Now		vs. Sam Houston State; Quarterfinals/Battle of the Piney Woods	W 68–46	20–11	Leonard E. Merrell Center (N/A); Katy, TX
03/08/2012; 6:00 pm, SLC TV		vs. Lamar; Semifinals	L 44–55	20–12	Leonard E. Merrell Center (N/A); Katy, TX
*Non-conference game. ^{#}Rankings from AP Poll. (#) Tournament seedings in parentheses.
