= 2011–12 Sam Houston State Bearkats men's basketball team =

American college basketball season

2011–12 Sam Houston State Bearkats men's basketball
- Conference: Southland Conference
- West
- Record: 13–19 (7–9 Southland)
- Head coach: Jason Hooten (2nd season)
- Assistant coaches: Alvin Brooks (2nd season); Chris Mudge (2nd season); Will Weaver (2nd season)
- Home arena: Bernard Johnson Coliseum

2011–12 Southland Conference men's basketball standings
| | Conf. | | | | Overall |
| Team | W | | L | PCT | W | | L | PCT |
|---|---|---|---|---|---|---|---|---|
East
| Lamar† | 11 | – | 5 | .688 | 23 | – | 12 | .657 |
| McNeese State | 10 | – | 6 | .625 | 17 | – | 16 | .515 |
| Northwestern State | 8 | – | 8 | .500 | 16 | – | 16 | .500 |
| Nicholls State | 6 | – | 10 | .375 | 10 | – | 20 | .333 |
| Southeastern Louisiana | 5 | – | 11 | .313 | 12 | – | 17 | .414 |
| Central Arkansas | 3 | – | 13 | .188 | 8 | – | 21 | .276 |
West
| Texas–Arlington | 15 | – | 1 | .938 | 24 | – | 9 | .727 |
| Stephen F. Austin | 12 | – | 4 | .750 | 20 | – | 12 | .625 |
| UTSA | 10 | – | 6 | .625 | 18 | – | 14 | .563 |
| Sam Houston State | 7 | – | 9 | .438 | 13 | – | 19 | .406 |
| Texas State | 5 | – | 11 | .313 | 13 | – | 17 | .433 |
| Texas A&M–Corpus Christi | 4 | – | 12 | .250 | 6 | – | 24 | .200 |
† 2012 Southland tournament winner As of March 14, 2012; Rankings from AP poll

The 2011–12 Sam Houston State Bearkats men's basketball team represented Sam Houston State University in the 2011–12 college basketball season. This was head coach Jason Hooten's second season at Sam Houston. The Bearkats played their home games at the Bernard Johnson Coliseum and are members of West Division of the Southland Conference. They finished the season 13–19, 7–9 in Southland play to finish in fourth place in the West Division. They lost in the quarterfinals of the Southland Basketball tournament to their rival Stephen F. Austin.

== Roster ==
2011–12 Sam Houston State Bearkats men's basketball team
Players
Coaches

| Pos. | # | Name | Height | Weight | Year | Previous school | Hometown |
|---|---|---|---|---|---|---|---|
| G | 1 | Darius Gatson | 5 ft 11 in (1.8 m) | 175 lb (79 kg) | Jr | Trinity Valley; Klein Forest | Houston, TX |
| G | 2 | Marquel McKinney | 6 ft 3 in (1.91 m) | 206 lb (93 kg) | Fr | Cypress Springs | Houston, TX |
| F | 4 | Erik Williams (redshirt) | 6 ft 7 in (2.01 m) | 215 lb (98 kg) | Jr | Marquette University; Cypress Springs | Houston, TX |
| G | 5 | Aaron Harwell | 5 ft 11 in (1.8 m) | 160 lb (73 kg) | So | Centenary; Elkins | Houston, TX |
| G | 10 | Cameron Sadler | 5 ft 10 in (1.78 m) | 160 lb (73 kg) | RS Jr | Columbia; Paschal | Ft. Worth, TX |
| G | 11 | Demarcus Gaitlin | 6 ft 4 in (1.93 m) | 190 lb (86 kg) | So | Navarro; Bush | Houston, TX |
| F | 14 | Steven Werner | 6 ft 8 in (2.03 m) | 230 lb (104 kg) | Jr | McLennan; Birdville | Ft. Worth, TX |
| F | 20 | Marcus James | 6 ft 7 in (2.01 m) | 195 lb (88 kg) | Sr | Seward County; Wilby | Waterbury, CT |
| C | 24 | Aaron Thompson | 6 ft 9 in (2.06 m) | 220 lb (100 kg) | Jr | Burkburnett | Burkburnett, TX |
| C | 25 | Antuan Bootle | 6 ft 7 in (2.01 m) | 265 lb (120 kg) | Sr | St. Thomas | Houston, TX |
| F | 32 | Wesley Fritz | 6 ft 4 in (1.93 m) | 180 lb (82 kg) | Jr | State Fair; Warrensburg | Huntsville, TX |
| C | 35 | Michael Holyfield | 6 ft 11 in (2.11 m) | 225 lb (102 kg) | Fr | Manzano | Albuquerque, NM |
| G | 44 | Konner Tucker | 6 ft 4 in (1.93 m) | 185 lb (84 kg) | RS Jr | Lon Morris; Wake Forest; Paschal | Ft. Worth, TX |

Head coach

- Jason Hooten (Tarleton State)

Assistant coach(es)

- Alvin Brooks (Idaho State)
- Chris Mudge (Texas)
- Will Weaver (Texas)

Legend

- (C) Team captain
- (S) Suspended
- (I) Ineligible
- (W) Walk-on
- Injured
- Current redshirt

== Media ==
All Bearkats basketball games are broadcast by KSAM 101.7 FM. All Bearkats home games are televised by the Bearkats Sports Network and are streamed online through gobearkats.com.

== Schedule and results ==
| Date time, TV | Rank^{#} | Opponent^{#} | Result | Record | Site (attendance) city, state |
Regular season
| November 12, 2011*; 7:30pm, Bearkat Sports Network | | Howard Payne | W 76–42 | 1–0 | Bernard Johnson Coliseum (1,276); Huntsville, TX |
| November 16, 2011*; 6:30pm | | at Notre Dame; CBE Classic | L 41–74 | 1–1 | Edmund P. Joyce Center (6,614); Notre Dame, IN |
| November 21, 2011*; 6:00pm | | at Mercer; CBE Classic | L 38–60 | 1–2 | University Center (1,537); Macon, GA |
| November 22, 2011*; 3:30pm | | vs. South Dakota State; CBE Classic | L 60–77 | 1–3 | University Center (2,312); Macon, GA |
| November 23, 2011*; 3:30pm | | vs. Niagara; CBE Classic | L 52–59 | 1–4 | University Center; Macon, GA |
| November 26, 2011*; 7:00pm, Longhorn Network | | at Texas | L 40–56 | 1–5 | Frank Erwin Center (10,173); Austin, TX |
| November 29, 2011*; 7:00pm, Bearkat Sports Network | | Dallas Christian | W 82–63 | 2–5 | Bernard Johnson Coliseum (1,282); Huntsville, TX |
| December 1, 2011*; 7:00pm, Bearkat Sports Network | | Paul Quinn | W 66–54 | 3–5 | Bernard Johnson Coliseum (1,111); Huntsville, TX |
| December 7, 2011*; 7:00pm, FSSW/FS HOU | | at Texas A&M | L 37–64 | 3–6 | Reed Arena (5,431); College Station, TX |
| December 10, 2011*; 7:00pm | | at North Texas | L 50–53 | 3–7 | Super Pit (3,313); Denton, TX |
| December 20, 2011*; 7:00pm, Bearkat Sports Network | | Northern Arizona | W 73–49 | 4–7 | Bernard Johnson Coliseum (458); Huntsville, TX |
| December 22, 2011*; 6:00pm, HLN | | at Cleveland State | L 45–63 | 4–8 | Wolstein Center (2,683); Cleveland, OH |
| December 28, 2011*; 7:00pm, Bearkat Sports Network | | Samford | W 74–58 | 5–8 | Bernard Johnson Coliseum (788); Huntsville, TX |
| January 2, 2012*; 7:00pm, Bearkat Sports Network | | Jarvis Christian | W 83–49 | 6–8 | Bernard Johnson Coliseum (497); Huntsville, TX |
| January 8, 2012; 1:00 pm, Bearkat Sports Network | | UTSA | L 60–62 | 6–9 (0–1) | Bernard Johnson Coliseum (1,054); Huntsville, TX |
| January 11, 2012; 1:00 pm | | at Texas–Arlington | L 40–66 | 6–10 (0–2) | Texas Hall (1,262); Arlington, TX |
| January 14, 2012; 3:30 pm | | at Nicholls State | W 75–65 | 7–10 (1–2) | Stopher Gym (337); Thibodaux, LA |
| January 18, 2012; 7:00 pm, Bearkat Sports Network | | Texas State | W 71–68 | 8–10 (2–2) | Bernard Johnson Coliseum (1,355); Huntsville, TX |
| January 21, 2012; 7:00 pm, Bearkat Sports Network | | Texas A&M–Corpus Christi | L 49–50 | 8–11 (2–3) | Bernard Johnson Coliseum (1,168); Huntsville, TX |
| January 25, 2012; 7:00 pm, SLC TV | | at Stephen F. Austin; Battle of the Piney Woods | L 66–67 ^{OT} | 8–12 (2–4) | William R. Johnson Coliseum (3,853); Nacogdoches, TX |
| January 28, 2012; 4:00 pm, Texas Channel | | at UTSA | L 66–78 | 8–13 (2–5) | Convocation Center (1,839); San Antonio, TX |
| February 1, 2012; 7:00 pm, Bearkat Sports Network | | McNeese State | L 61–67 | 8–14 (2–6) | Bernard Johnson Coliseum (1,234); Huntsville, TX |
| February 4, 2012; 6:00 pm | | at Southeastern Louisiana | W 57–55 | 9–14 (3–6) | University Center (712); Hammond, LA |
| February 8, 2012; 7:00 pm, Bearkat Sports Network | | Texas–Arlington | L 63–75 | 9–15 (3–7) | Bernard Johnson Coliseum (1,601); Huntsville, TX |
| February 11, 2012; 1:00 pm | | at Texas A&M–Corpus Christi | W 61–53 | 10–15 (4–7) | American Bank Center (1,268); Corpus Christi, TX |
| February 15, 2012; 7:00 pm, Bearkat Sports Network | | Central Arkansas | W 76–59 | 11–15 (5–7) | Bernard Johnson Coliseum (878); Huntsville, TX |
| February 18, 2012*; 2:00 pm, Bearkat Sports Network | | Toledo; ESPN BracketBusters | L 58–59 | 11–16 | Bernard Johnson Coliseum (1,055); Huntsville, TX |
| February 22, 2012; 7:00 pm | | at Northwestern State | W 50–37 | 12–16 (6–7) | Prather Coliseum; Natchitoches, LA |
| February 25, 2012; 7:00 pm, Bearkat Sports Network | | Lamar | L 49–72 | 12–17 (6–8) | Bernard Johnson Coliseum (1,055); Huntsville, TX |
| February 29, 2012; 7:00 pm, Bearkat Sports Network | | Stephen F. Austin; Battle of the Piney Woods | L 47–58 | 12–18 (6–9) | Bernard Johnson Coliseum (1,857); Huntsville, TX |
| March 3, 2012; 4:00 pm | | at Texas State | W 63–61 | 13–18 (7–9) | Strahan Coliseum (2,300); San Marcos, TX |
Southland tournament
| March 7, 2012; 12:00 pm, SLC Now | | vs. Stephen F. Austin; Quarterfinals/Battle of the Piney Woods | L 46–68 | 13–19 | Leonard E. Merrell Center (1,829); Katy, TX |
*Non-conference game. ^{#}Rankings from AP Poll. (#) Tournament seedings in parentheses. All times are in Central.
