= 2011–12 Texas A&M–Corpus Christi Islanders men's basketball team =

American college basketball season

2011–12 Texas A&M–Corpus Christi Islanders men's basketball
- Conference: Southland Conference
- West
- Record: 6–24 (4–12 Southland)
- Head coach: Willis Wilson (1st season)
- Assistant coaches: Marty Gross; K. T. Turner; Mark Dannhoff
- Home arena: American Bank Center

2011–12 Southland Conference men's basketball standings
| | Conf. | | | | Overall |
| Team | W | | L | PCT | W | | L | PCT |
|---|---|---|---|---|---|---|---|---|
East
| Lamar† | 11 | – | 5 | .688 | 23 | – | 12 | .657 |
| McNeese State | 10 | – | 6 | .625 | 17 | – | 16 | .515 |
| Northwestern State | 8 | – | 8 | .500 | 16 | – | 16 | .500 |
| Nicholls State | 6 | – | 10 | .375 | 10 | – | 20 | .333 |
| Southeastern Louisiana | 5 | – | 11 | .313 | 12 | – | 17 | .414 |
| Central Arkansas | 3 | – | 13 | .188 | 8 | – | 21 | .276 |
West
| Texas–Arlington | 15 | – | 1 | .938 | 24 | – | 9 | .727 |
| Stephen F. Austin | 12 | – | 4 | .750 | 20 | – | 12 | .625 |
| UTSA | 10 | – | 6 | .625 | 18 | – | 14 | .563 |
| Sam Houston State | 7 | – | 9 | .438 | 13 | – | 19 | .406 |
| Texas State | 5 | – | 11 | .313 | 13 | – | 17 | .433 |
| Texas A&M–Corpus Christi | 4 | – | 12 | .250 | 6 | – | 24 | .200 |
† 2012 Southland tournament winner As of March 14, 2012; Rankings from AP poll

The 2011–12 Texas A&M–Corpus Christi Islanders men's basketball team represented Texas A&M University–Corpus Christi in the 2011–12 college basketball season. This was head coach Willis Wilson's first season at Texas A&M–Corpus Christi. The Islanders are members of the West Division of the Southland Conference. They played their home games at the American Bank Center. They finished the season 6–24, 4–12 in Southland play to finish in last place in the West Division. They failed to qualify for the Southland Basketball tournament.

== Media ==
Texas A&M–Corpus Christi men's basketball airs on KKTX with Steven King on the call all season long. Video streaming of all non-televised home games is available at GoIslanders.com.

== Roster ==
2011–12 Texas A&M–Corpus Christi Islanders men's basketball team
Players
Coaches

| Pos. | # | Name | Height | Weight | Year | Previous school | Hometown |
|---|---|---|---|---|---|---|---|
| G | 1 | Hameed Ali | 6 ft 2 in (1.88 m) | 170 lb (77 kg) | Fr | San Leandro | Hayward, CA |
| G/F | 4 | Jason Smith | 6 ft 3 in (1.91 m) | 190 lb (86 kg) | Jr | Allen CC | Ft. Worth, TX |
| G | 5 | Terence Jones | 6 ft 2 in (1.88 m) | 185 lb (84 kg) | Jr | Notre Dame Prep | Baltimore, MD |
| G | 10 | Johnathan Jordan | 5 ft 10 in (1.78 m) | 165 lb (75 kg) | Fr | Hightower | Houston, TX |
| G/F | 11 | Chris Hawkins-Mast | 6 ft 6 in (1.98 m) | 200 lb (91 kg) | Sr | Eastern Utah | Washington D.C. |
| G | 12 | Jake Kocher | 6 ft 1 in (1.85 m) | 175 lb (79 kg) | Fr | St. Michael's | Austin, TX |
| F | 15 | Kevin Lynch | 6 ft 7 in (2.01 m) | 230 lb (104 kg) | So | Schreiner University | Rockport, TX |
| F | 21 | Jordan Pope-Didier | 6 ft 8 in (2.03 m) | 215 lb (98 kg) | Fr | Westwind Academy | Rockford, IL |
| F | 22 | Myron Dempsey | 6 ft 6 in (1.98 m) | 225 lb (102 kg) | Jr | Redlands Community College | St. Petersburg, FL |
| F/C | 23 | Nate Maxey | 6 ft 11 in (2.11 m) | 215 lb (98 kg) | Fr | Westwind Academy | San Diego, CA |
| G | 25 | Charlie Hurd | 5 ft 11 in (1.8 m) | 160 lb (73 kg) | Jr | Tarleton State | Houston, TX |
| G | 32 | James King | 6 ft 0 in (1.83 m) | 180 lb (82 kg) | Fr | Steele | Schertz, TX |
| C | 33 | Ted Wang | 7 ft 0 in (2.13 m) | 215 lb (98 kg) | So | Westwind Academy | Zhe Jiang, China |
| G | 42 | Kennon Dvorak | 6 ft 2 in (1.88 m) | 185 lb (84 kg) | RS So | Victoria College | Moulton, TX |

Head coach

- Willis Wilson (Rice)

Assistant coach(es)

- Marty Gross (Jacksonville)
- Kenneth "K. T." Turner (Oklahoma City)
- Mark Dannhoff (UW–La Crosse)

Legend

- (C) Team captain
- (S) Suspended
- (I) Ineligible
- (W) Walk-on
- Injured
- Current redshirt

== Schedule and results ==
| Date time, TV | Rank^{#} | Opponent^{#} | Result | Record | Site (attendance) city, state |
Exhibition
| 11/05/2011*; 7:30pm | | Incarnate Word | L 65–69 ^{OT} | | American Bank Center (N/A); Corpus Christi, TX |
Regular season
| 11/11/2011*; 7:00pm | | at Oklahoma State | L 39–71 | 0–1 | Gallagher-Iba Arena (9,377); Stillwater, OK |
| 11/14/2011*; 7:00pm | | Denver | L 58–65 | 0–2 | American Bank Center (1,226); Corpus Christi, TX |
| 11/22/2011*; 7:00pm | | Utah State | W 58–55 ^{OT} | 1–2 | American Bank Center (1,382); Corpus Christi, TX |
| 11/26/2011*; 3:00pm | | at No. 25 Texas A&M | L 43–56 | 1–3 | Reed Arena (6,114); College Station, TX |
| 12/01/2011*; 7:00pm, CSS/ESPN3 | | Texas Tech | L 54–61 | 1–4 | American Bank Center (2,719); Corpus Christi, TX |
| 12/03/2011*; 7:00pm | | at Houston | L 66–87 | 1–5 | Hofheinz Pavilion (3,052); Houston, TX |
| 12/15/2011*; 7:00pm | | South Alabama | L 64–66 | 1–6 | American Bank Center (1,159); Corpus Christi, TX |
| 12/17/2011*; 2:00pm, ESPN3 | | at West Virginia; Las Vegas Classic | L 64–84 | 1–7 | WVU Coliseum (7,226); Morgantown, WV |
| 12/19/2011*; 7:00pm | | at Missouri State; Las Vegas Classic | L 53–66 | 1–8 | JQH Arena (5,002); Springfield, MO |
| 12/22/2011*; 12:00pm | | vs. Bethune–Cookman; Las Vegas Classic | L 52–61 | 1–9 | Orleans Arena (N/A); Las Vegas, NV |
| 12/23/2011*; 12:00pm | | vs. Kennesaw State; Las Vegas Classic | L 65–69 | 1–10 | Orleans Arena (N/A); Las Vegas, NV |
| 12/28/2011*; 7:00pm | | at Rice | L 66–78 | 1–11 | Tudor Fieldhouse (1,479); Houston, TX |
| 01/04/2012; 7:00pm, SLC TV | | Lamar | L 58–74 | 1–12 (0–1) | American Bank Center (1,078); Corpus Christi, TX |
| 01/07/2012; 7:00pm | | McNeese State | L 69–71 | 1–13 (0–2) | American Bank Center (1,028); Corpus Christi, TX |
| 01/11/2012; 7:00pm | | UTSA | W 50–49 | 2–13 (1–2) | Convocation Center (1,161); San Antonio, TX |
| 01/14/2012; 7:00pm | | at Southeastern Louisiana | L 55–67 | 2–14 (1–3) | University Center (465); Hammond, LA |
| 01/18/2012; 7:00pm | | at UT–Arlington | L 73–77 | 2–15 (1–4) | Dugan Wellness Center (840); Corpus Christi, TX |
| 01/21/2012; 7:00pm | | at Sam Houston State | W 50–49 | 3–15 (2–4) | Bernard Johnson Coliseum (1,168); Huntsville, TX |
| 01/25/2012; 7:00pm | | at Texas State | W 74–68 | 4–15 (3–4) | American Bank Center (1,528); Corpus Christi, TX |
| 01/28/2012; 7:00pm | | Stephen F. Austin; Homecoming | L 49–64 | 4–16 (3–5) | American Bank Center (2,327); Corpus Christi, TX |
| 02/01/2012; 6:30pm | | at Nicholls State | L 61–65 | 4–17 (3–6) | Stopher Gym (632); Thibodaux, LA |
| 02/04/2012; 2:00pm | | at Northwestern State | L 68–82 | 4–18 (3–7) | Prather Coliseum (1,523); Natchitoches, LA |
| 02/06/2012*; 7:00pm | | at Savannah State | L 49–55 | 4–19 | Tiger Arena (1,445); Savannah, GA |
| 02/11/2012; 7:00pm | | Sam Houston State | L 53–61 | 4–20 (3–8) | American Bank Center (1,268); Corpus Christi, TX |
| 02/15/2012; 7:00pm | | at Texas State | L 61–79 | 4–21 (3–9) | Strahan Coliseum (1,973); San Marcos, TX |
| 02/18/2012*; 7:00pm | | at Central Michigan | W 49–47 | 5–21 | McGuirk Arena (1,431); Mt. Pleasant, MI |
| 02/22/2012; 7:00pm | | UTSA | L 82–86 ^{OT} | 5–22 (3–10) | American Bank Center (1,197); Corpus Christi, TX |
| 02/25/2012; 7:00pm | | at Stephen F. Austin | L 41–74 | 5–23 (3–11) | William R. Johnson Coliseum (1,909); Nacogdoches, TX |
| 02/29/2012; 7:00pm | | at UT–Arlington | L 64–78 | 5–24 (3–12) | College Park Center (4,109); Arlington, TX |
| 03/03/2012; 7:00pm | | Central Arkansas | W 67–65 | 6–24 (4–12) | American Bank Center (1,550); Corpus Christi, TX |
*Non-conference game. ^{#}Rankings from AP Poll. (#) Tournament seedings in parentheses.
