= 2011–12 Lamar Cardinals basketball team =

American college basketball season

2011–12 Lamar Cardinals men's basketball

Southland tournament champions Southland East Division Champions

NCAA Tournament 16-seed, First Four
- Conference: Southland Conference
- East Division
- Record: 23–12 (11–5 Southland)
- Head coach: Pat Knight (1st season)
- Assistant coaches: Joseph Price; Kenton Paulino; Clif Carroll
- Home arena: Montagne Center

2011–12 Southland Conference men's basketball standings
	Conf.				Overall
Team	W		L	PCT	W		L	PCT
East
Lamar†	11	–	5	.688	23	–	12	.657
McNeese State	10	–	6	.625	17	–	16	.515
Northwestern State	8	–	8	.500	16	–	16	.500
Nicholls State	6	–	10	.375	10	–	20	.333
Southeastern Louisiana	5	–	11	.313	12	–	17	.414
Central Arkansas	3	–	13	.188	8	–	21	.276
West
Texas–Arlington	15	–	1	.938	24	–	9	.727
Stephen F. Austin	12	–	4	.750	20	–	12	.625
UTSA	10	–	6	.625	18	–	14	.563
Sam Houston State	7	–	9	.438	13	–	19	.406
Texas State	5	–	11	.313	13	–	17	.433
Texas A&M–Corpus Christi	4	–	12	.250	6	–	24	.200
† 2012 Southland tournament winner As of March 14, 2012; Rankings from AP poll

The 2011–12 Lamar Cardinals basketball team represented Lamar University during the 2011–12 NCAA Division I men's basketball season. The Cardinals, led by first year head coach Pat Knight, played their home games at the Montagne Center and are members of the East Division of the Southland Conference. The Cardinals finished the season 23–12, 11–5 in Southland play. They were the champions of the Southland East Division and are the champions of the Southland Basketball tournament and earned an automatic bid into the 2012 NCAA tournament where they lost to Vermont in the First Four round.

== Roster ==
Team Roster
Number	Name	Position	Height	Weight	Year	Hometown
1	Anthony Miles	Guard	6–1	165	Senior	Houston, Texas
2	Nikko Acosta	Forward	6–9	220	Junior	New London, Connecticut
3	Tre Lynch	Guard	6–0	160	Sophomore	Lancaster, Texas
4	Devon Lamb	Guard	6–2	195	Senior	Jacksonville, Florida
5	Mike James	Guard	6–1	185	Senior	Portland, Oregon
10	Rhon Mitchell	Forward	6–5	180	Freshman	Inglewood, California
20	Brandon Davis	Guard	6–6	180	Senior	Jacksonville, Florida
21	Charlie Harper	Forward	6–5	210	Senior	San Antonio, Texas
22	Donley Minor	Guard	6–1	175	Junior	Los Angeles, California
24	Vincenzo Nelson	Forward	6–5	205	Senior	Jackson, Mississippi
33	Osas Ebomwonyi	Forward	6–11	220	Sophomore	Pflugerville, Texas
35	Stan Brown	Forward	6–8	225	Junior	Dolton, Illinois
50	Sebastian Norman	Forward	6–9	235	Freshman	Uppsala, Sweden

== Schedule ==
Schedule
Date time, TV	Rank^{#}	Opponent^{#}	Result	Record	Site (attendance) city, state
Exhibition
11/01/2011*; 7:00 pm		St. Gregory's	W 82–47		Montagne Center (2,686); Beaumont, TX
11/07/2011*; 7:00 pm		Louisiana College	W 72–49		Montagne Center (1,055); Beaumont, TX
Regular season
11/11/2011*; 7:30 pm		Arkansas State; Global Sports Invitational	W 65–62	1–0	Montagne Center (2,689); Beaumont, TX
11/13/2011*; 3:00 pm, ESPN3		at No. 9 Louisville; Global Sports Invitational	L 48–68	1–1	KFC Yum! Center (19,842); Louisville, KY
11/15/2011*; 6:00 pm		at Ohio; Global Sports Invitational	L 78–85 ^{OT}	1–2	Convocation Center (3,672); Athens, OH
11/19/2011*; 11:00 am		Charlotte	W 72–54	2–2	Montagne Center (2,248); Beaumont, TX
11/22/2011*; 7:00 pm		at UT Martin; Global Sports Invitational	W 80–69	3–2	Skyhawk Arena (1,037); Martin, TN
11/25/2011*; 7:00 pm		at Tennessee Tech	W 85–65	4–2	Eblen Center (857); Cookeville, TN
11/30/2011*; 7:00 pm		at TCU	L 72–77	4–3	Daniel–Meyer Coliseum (4,263); Fort Worth, TX
12/03/2011*; 8:30 pm		Louisiana–Lafayette	W 80–63	5–3	Montagne Center (2,827); Beaumont, TX
12/05/2011*; 7:00 pm		Texas–Pan American	W 60–49	6–3	Montagne Center (2,467); Beaumont, TX
12/14/2011*; 7:00 pm		Huston–Tillotson	W 88–59	7–3	Montagne Center (2,248); Beaumont, TX
12/17/2011*; 7:00 pm		at Rice	W 87–81	8–3	Tudor Fieldhouse (1,516); Houston, TX
12/20/2011*; 7:30 pm, BTN		at No. 2 Ohio State	L 50–70	8–4	Value City Arena (14,169); Columbus, OH
12/28/2011*; 7:00 pm, ESPNU		at No. 3 Kentucky	L 64–86	8–5	Rupp Arena (24,230); Lexington, KY
12/31/2011*; 7:00 pm		Lyon	W 102–58	9–5	Montagne Center (2,178); Beaumont, TX
01/04/2012; 7:00 pm, SLC TV		at Texas A&M–Corpus Christi	W 74–58	10–5 (1–0)	American Bank Center (1,078); Corpus Christi, TX
01/07/2012; 3:30 pm		Central Arkansas	W 103–67	11–5 (2–0)	Montagne Center (3,257); Beaumont, TX
01/11/2012; 7:30 pm		at McNeese State	L 54–57	11–6 (2–1)	Burton Coliseum (2,158); Lake Charles, LA
01/14/2012; 2:00 pm		UT–Arlington	L 82–91	11–7 (2–2)	Montagne Center (2,466); Beaumont, TX
01/21/2012; 4:00 pm, KBTV		at Central Arkansas	W 92–78	12–7 (3–2)	Farris Center (2,227); Conway, AR
01/25/2012; 7:00 pm		at Northwestern State	L 62–74	12–8 (3–3)	Prather Coliseum (1,277); Natchitoches, LA
01/28/2012; 2:00 pm		Nicholls State	W 80–56	13–8 (4–3)	Montagne Center (2,965); Beaumont, TX
02/01/2012; 7:00 pm		at Southeastern Louisiana	W 83–59	14–8 (5–3)	University Center (1,016); Hammond, LA
02/04/2012; 2:00 pm		UTSA	W 80–66	15–8 (6–3)	Montagne Center (2,743); Beaumont, TX
02/08/2012; 7:00 pm		Northwestern State	W 85–66	16–8 (7–3)	Montagne Center (2,829); Beaumont, TX
02/11/2012; 1:00 pm, KBTV		at Nicholls State	L 63–72	16–9 (7–4)	Stopher Gym (597); Thibodaux, LA
02/15/2012; 7:00 pm		Southeastern Louisiana	W 70–54	17–9 (8–4)	Montagne Center (2,577); Beaumont, TX
02/18/2012*; 3:00 pm		at George Mason; ESPN BracketBusters	L 71–75	17–10	Patriot Center (7,014); Fairfax, VA
02/22/2012; 7:00 pm		Stephen F. Austin	L 52–62	17–11 (8–5)	Montagne Center (3,037); Beaumont, TX
02/25/2012; 7:00 pm		at Sam Houston State	W 72–49	18–11 (9–5)	Bernard Johnson Coliseum (1,055); Huntsville, TX
02/29/2012; 7:00 pm		at Texas State	W 81–65	19–11 (10–5)	Strahan Coliseum (1,946); San Marcos, TX
03/03/2012; 3:30 pm		McNeese State	W 78–68	20–11 (11–5)	Montagne Center (5,138); Beaumont, TX
2012 Southland Conference men's basketball tournament
03/07/2012; 2:30 pm, SLC Now		vs. Northwestern State; Quarterfinals	W 76–69	21–11	Leonard E. Merrell Center (1,436); Katy, TX
03/08/2012; 6:00 pm, SLC TV		vs. Stephen F. Austin; Semifinals	W 55–44	22–11	Leonard E. Merrell Center (1,829); Katy, TX
03/10/2012; 2:00 pm, ESPN2		vs. McNeese State; Championship Game	W 70–49	23–11	Leonard E. Merrell Center (3,593); Katy, TX
2012 NCAA Tournament
03/14/2012*; 5:30 pm, truTV		vs. Vermont; First Four	L 59–71	23–12	University of Dayton Arena (7,218); Dayton, OH
*Non-conference game. ^{#}Rankings from AP Poll. (#) Tournament seedings in parentheses. All times are in Central Time.
