= 2012 Southland Conference men's basketball tournament =

- Tournament logo
- Classification: Division I
- Season: 2011–12
- Teams: 8
- Site: Merrell Center; Katy, Texas
- Champions: Lamar (4th title)
- Winning coach: Pat Knight (1st title)
- MVP: Mike James (Lamar)
- Television: ESPN2, SLC TV

2011–12 Southland Conference men's basketball standings
	Conf.				Overall
Team	W		L	PCT	W		L	PCT
East
Lamar†	11	–	5	.688	23	–	12	.657
McNeese State	10	–	6	.625	17	–	16	.515
Northwestern State	8	–	8	.500	16	–	16	.500
Nicholls State	6	–	10	.375	10	–	20	.333
Southeastern Louisiana	5	–	11	.313	12	–	17	.414
Central Arkansas	3	–	13	.188	8	–	21	.276
West
Texas–Arlington	15	–	1	.938	24	–	9	.727
Stephen F. Austin	12	–	4	.750	20	–	12	.625
UTSA	10	–	6	.625	18	–	14	.563
Sam Houston State	7	–	9	.438	13	–	19	.406
Texas State	5	–	11	.313	13	–	17	.433
Texas A&M–Corpus Christi	4	–	12	.250	6	–	24	.200
† 2012 Southland tournament winner As of March 14, 2012; Rankings from AP poll

The 2012 Southland Conference men's basketball tournament, a part of the 2011–12 NCAA Division I men's basketball season, took place March 7, 8 and 10, 2012 at the Merrell Center in Katy, Texas The winner of the tournament received the Southland Conference's automatic bid to the 2012 NCAA Tournament.

== Format ==
Tournament seeding, 1 through 8, was based upon regular-season winning percentage regardless of divisional place in Conference competition. The quarterfinals were broadcast online by the Conference's Internet streamer, SLC Now. The semi-finals were broadcast regionally on SLC TV and nationally on ESPN3 while the championship game was broadcast nationally on ESPN2 and ESPN3.

== Bracket ==
Quarterfinals; Wednesday, March 7 SLC Now
1	Texas-Arlington	96
8	Nicholls State	48
4	McNeese State	78
5	UTSA	74^{OT}
2	Stephen F. Austin	68
7	Sam Houston State	46
3	Lamar	76
6	Northwestern State	69

Semifinals; Thursday, March 8 SLC TV
1	Texas–Arlington	72
4	McNeese State	92
2	Stephen F. Austin	44
3	Lamar	55

Finals; Saturday, March 10; ESPN2
4	McNeese State	49
3	Lamar	70

== Game summaries ==
SLC Now

Mar 7
12:00 pm

Recap

Stephen F. Austin Lumberjacks 68, Sam Houston State Bearkats 46
Scoring by half: 29–22, 39–24
Pts: 3 tied with 13; Rebs: Taylor Smith 7 Asts: 2 tied with 4	Pts: Konner Tucker 11; Rebs: Antuan Bootle 5 Asts: Demarcus Gatlin 4

Leonard E. Merrell Center
Katy, TX
Attendance: N/A
Referees: N/A

SLC Now

Mar 7
2:30 pm

Recap

Lamar Cardinals 76, Northwestern State Demons 69
Scoring by half: 36–26, 40–43
Pts: Mike James 21; Rebs: Stan Brown 10; Asts: Mike James 4	Pts: William Mosley 22; Rebs: William Mosley 9 Asts: Tyler Washington 3

Leonard E. Merrell Center
Katy, TX
Attendance: 1,436
Referees: Sean Casey, Kyle Ingram, Greg White

SLC Now

Mar 7
6:00 pm

Recap

UT-Arlington Mavericks 96, Nicholls State Colonels 48
Scoring by half: 42–19, 54–29
Pts: Bo Ingram 21; Rebs: Jordan Reves 11; Asts: Shaq White-Miller 6	Pts: Jeremy Smith 17; Rebs: Jeremy Smith 8 Asts: 4 tied with 1

Leonard E. Merrell Center
Katy, TX
Attendance: N/A
Referees: Jeff Malham, Jon Stigliano, Kelly Groom

SLC Now

Mar 7
8:30 pm

Recap

McNeese State Cowboys 78, UTSA Roadrunners 74 (OT)
Scoring by half: 19–30, 44–33 Overtime: 15–11
Pts: Dontae Cannon 18; Rebs: Patrick Richard 11; Asts: Patrick Richard 7	Pts: Melvin Johnson III 19; Rebs: Stephen Franklin 10; Asts: Kannon Burrage 4

Leonard E. Merrell Center
Katy, TX
Attendance: 1,303
Referees: Mike Thibodeaux, Brent Dugas, David Stevens

SLC TV

Mar 8
6:00 pm

Recap

Stephen F. Austin Lumberjacks 44, Lamar Cardinals 55
Scoring by half: 19–26, 25–29
Pts: Taylor Smith 14; Rebs: 2 tied with 8 Asts: Hal Bateman 3	Pts: Anthony Miles 17; Rebs: Anthony Miles 7 Asts: Anthony Miles 5

Leonard E. Merrell Center
Katy, TX
Attendance: N/A
Referees: Jeff Malham, Mike Thibodeaux, Kyle Ingram

SLC TV

Mar 8
8:30 pm

Recap

UT-Arlington Mavericks 72, McNeese State Cowboys 92
Scoring by half: 32–44, 40–48
Pts: LaMarcus Reed III 23; Rebs: Bradley Gay 6 Asts: LaMarcus Reed III 3	Pts: Patrick Richard 20; Rebs: Rudy Turner 9 Asts: Patrick Richard 6

Leonard E. Merrell Center
Katy, TX
Attendance: 1,829
Referees: Brent Dugas, Jon Stigliano, Greg White

ESPN2

Mar 10
2:00 pm

Recap

Lamar Cardinals 70, McNeese State Cowboys 49
Scoring by half: 33–21, 37–28
Pts: Mike James 26; Rebs: Mike James 9 Asts: Anthony Miles 5	Pts: Patrick Richard 16; Rebs: Desharick Guidry 10; Asts: Dontae Cannon 3

Leonard E. Merrell Center
Katy, TX
Attendance: 3,593
Referees: Kerry Sitton, Keith Kimble, Sean Casey
