= 2011–12 McNeese State Cowboys basketball team =

American college basketball season

2011–12 McNeese State Cowboys basketball

CollegeInsider.com Tournament, First round
- Conference: Southland Conference
- East Division
- Record: 17–16 (10–6 SLC)
- Head coach: Dave Simmons (6th season)
- Assistant coaches: David Dumars; Patrick Haynes; Steve Welch
- Home arena: Burton Coliseum

2011–12 Southland Conference men's basketball standings
	Conf.				Overall
Team	W		L	PCT	W		L	PCT
East
Lamar†	11	–	5	.688	23	–	12	.657
McNeese State	10	–	6	.625	17	–	16	.515
Northwestern State	8	–	8	.500	16	–	16	.500
Nicholls State	6	–	10	.375	10	–	20	.333
Southeastern Louisiana	5	–	11	.313	12	–	17	.414
Central Arkansas	3	–	13	.188	8	–	21	.276
West
Texas–Arlington	15	–	1	.938	24	–	9	.727
Stephen F. Austin	12	–	4	.750	20	–	12	.625
UTSA	10	–	6	.625	18	–	14	.563
Sam Houston State	7	–	9	.438	13	–	19	.406
Texas State	5	–	11	.313	13	–	17	.433
Texas A&M–Corpus Christi	4	–	12	.250	6	–	24	.200
† 2012 Southland tournament winner As of March 14, 2012; Rankings from AP poll

The 2011–12 McNeese State Cowboys basketball team represented McNeese State University in the 2011–12 NCAA Division I men's basketball season. The Cowboys, led by head coach Dave Simmons, played their home games at the Burton Coliseum in Lake Charles, Louisiana, as members of the Southland Conference. After finishing 4th in the Southland during the regular season, the Cowboys made a run to the championship game of the Southland Conference tournament, where they were defeated by Lamar.

McNeese State failed to qualify for the NCAA tournament, but received a bid to the 2012 CollegeInsider.com Postseason Tournament. The Cowboys were eliminated in the first round of the CIT by Toledo, 76–63.

== Roster ==
2011–12 McNeese State Cowboys men's basketball team
Players
Coaches

Pos.	#	Name	Height	Weight	Year	Hometown
G	2	Jeremie Mitchell	6 ft 3 in (1.91 m)	180 lb (82 kg)	Jr	Monroe, Louisiana
G/F	3	Patrick Richard	6 ft 4 in (1.93 m)	208 lb (94 kg)	Sr	Carencro, Louisiana
PG	5	Dontae Cannon	6 ft 1 in (1.85 m)	168 lb (76 kg)	Jr	Alexandria, Louisiana
G/F	10	Brandon Regis	6 ft 3 in (1.91 m)	196 lb (89 kg)	Jr	Addison, Texas
G	11	Kevin Hardy	6 ft 2 in (1.88 m)	180 lb (82 kg)	Fr	Lake Charles, Louisiana
G	12	Ledrick Eackles	6 ft 3 in (1.91 m)	200 lb (91 kg)	Jr	Zachary, Louisiana
F	15	Will Brown	6 ft 9 in (2.06 m)	240 lb (109 kg)	Jr	Los Angeles, California
F	20	Adrian Fields	6 ft 5 in (1.96 m)	197 lb (89 kg)	So	Opelousas, Louisiana
F	24	Mari Konate	6 ft 8 in (2.03 m)	195 lb (88 kg)	Sr	Janville, France
C	25	Craig McFerrin	6 ft 7 in (2.01 m)	230 lb (104 kg)	Fr	Baton Rouge, Louisiana
F	32	Desharick Guidry	6 ft 5 in (1.96 m)	200 lb (91 kg)	Fr	Lake Charles, Louisiana
F/C	35	Tyson Queen	6 ft 5 in (1.96 m)	220 lb (100 kg)	Sr	Baytown, Texas
C	52	Rudy Turner	6 ft 9 in (2.06 m)	285 lb (129 kg)	Sr	Boyce, Louisiana
F	54	Daniel Richard	6 ft 9 in (2.06 m)	190 lb (86 kg)	Sr	Lake Charles, Louisiana

Head coach

- Dave Simmons (Louisiana Tech)

Assistant coach(es)

- David Dumars (Louisiana–Monroe)
- Patrick Haynes (McNeese State)
- Steve Welch (Southeastern Louisiana)

Legend

- (C) Team captain
- (S) Suspended
- (I) Ineligible
- (W) Walk-on
- Injured
- Current redshirt

Roster
Last update: January 8, 2023

== Schedule and results ==
Date time, TV	Rank^{#}	Opponent^{#}	Result	Record	Site city, state
Regular season
November 11, 2011*; 7:00 pm		at Auburn	L 62–84	0–1	Auburn Arena (5,225); Auburn, AL
November 15, 2011*; 7:00 pm		Louisiana College	W 71–52	1–1	Burton Coliseum (1,056); Lake Charles, LA
November 18, 2011*; 7:00 pm		at Georgia State	L 50–69	1–2	GSU Sports Arena (1,370); Atlanta, GA
November 22, 2011*; 7:00 pm		Dillard	W 80–43	2–2	Burton Coliseum (657); Lake Charles, LA
November 26, 2011*; 9:00 pm		at Sacramento State	W 68–63	3–2	Hornets Nest (644); Sacramento, CA
November 28, 2011*; 9:30 pm		at No. 24 California	L 57–73	3–3	Haas Pavilion (6,407); Berkeley, CA
December 1, 2011*; 7:00 pm		at Louisiana–Lafayette	L 56–78	3–4	Cajundome (3,409); Lafayette, LA
December 10, 2011*; 7:00 pm		Bacone	W 86–45	4–4	Burton Coliseum (828); Lake Charles, LA
December 14, 2011*; 7:00 pm		at Louisiana Tech	L 58–60	4–5	Thomas Assembly Center (2,426); Ruston, LA
December 19, 2011*; 8:00 pm		at UTEP	L 54–69	4–6	Don Haskins Center (5,737); El Paso, TX
December 21, 2011*; 3:00 pm		at New Mexico State	L 62–82	4–7	Pan American Center (4,844); Las Cruces, NM
December 31, 2011*; 1:00 pm		Southern Miss	L 56–65	4–8	Burton Coliseum (986); Lake Charles, LA
January 7, 2012; 7:00 pm		at Texas A&M–Corpus Christi	W 71–69	5–8 (1–0)	American Bank Center (1,028); Corpus Christi, TX
January 11, 2012; 7:00 pm		Lamar	W 57–54	6–8 (2–0)	Burton Coliseum (2,158); Lake Charles, LA
January 14, 2012; 3:00 pm		at Texas State	L 73–82	6–9 (2–1)	Strahan Coliseum (1,194); San Marcos, TX
January 18, 2012; 7:00 pm		Southeastern Louisiana	W 61–47	7–9 (3–1)	Burton Coliseum (782); Lake Charles, LA
January 21, 2012; 3:00 pm		Northwestern State	L 61–64	7–10 (3–2)	Burton Coliseum (1,535); Lake Charles, LA
January 25, 2012; 7:00 pm		at Nicholls State	W 60–56	8–10 (4–2)	Stopher Gymnasium (755); Thibodaux, LA
January 29, 2012; 3:00 pm		Central Arkansas	W 87–76	9–10 (5–2)	Burton Coliseum (936); Lake Charles, LA
February 1, 2012; 7:00 pm		at Sam Houston State	W 67–61	10–10 (6–2)	Bernard Johnson Coliseum (1,234); Huntsville, TX
February 5, 2012; 2:00 pm		Stephen F. Austin	W 66–56	11–10 (7–2)	Burton Coliseum (858); Lake Charles, LA
February 11, 2012; 3:00 pm		at Central Arkansas	W 71–56	12–10 (8–2)	Farris Center (1,043); Conway, AR
February 13, 2012; 7:00 pm		at Northwestern State	W 70–61	13–10 (9–2)	Prather Coliseum (2,233); Natchitoches, LA
February 15, 2012; 7:00 pm		UTSA	W 58–54	14–10 (10–2)	Burton Coliseum (1,035); Lake Charles, LA
February 18, 2012; 3:00 pm		Southeast Missouri State; ESPN BracketBusters	W 73–63	15–10	Burton Coliseum (1,144); Lake Charles, LA
February 22, 2012; 7:00 pm		Texas–Arlington	L 89–93	15–11 (10–3)	Burton Coliseum (1,547); Lake Charles, LA
February 25, 2012; 3:00 pm		Nicholls State	L 75–78	15–12 (10–4)	Burton Coliseum (1,852); Lake Charles, LA
February 29, 2012; 7:00 pm		at Southeastern Louisiana	L 57–64	15–13 (10–5)	University Center (1,019); Hammond, LA
March 3, 2012; 3:00 pm		Lamar	L 68–78	15–14 (10–6)	Montagne Center (5,138); Beaumont, TX
Southland Tournament
March 7, 2012; 8:30 pm	(4)	vs. (5) UTSA; Southland Quarterfinals	W 78–74 ^{OT}	16–14	Merrell Center (1,303); Katy, TX
March 8, 2012; 8:30 pm	(4)	vs. (1) Texas–Arlington; Southland Semifinals	W 92–72	17–14	Merrell Center (1,829); Katy, TX
March 10, 2012; 2:00 pm	(4)	vs. (3) Lamar; Southland Championship	L 49–70	17–15	Merrell Center (3,593); Katy, TX
CollegeInsider.com Tournament
March 13, 2012		at Toledo; CollegeInsider.com First Round	L 63–76	17–16	Savage Arena (1,140); Toledo, OH
*Non-conference game. ^{#}Rankings from AP Poll. (#) Tournament seedings in parentheses. All times are in Central Time.
