= 2011–12 UTSA Roadrunners men's basketball team =

American college basketball season

2011–12 UTSA Roadrunners men's basketball
- Conference: Southland Conference
- West
- Record: 18–14 (10–6 Southland)
- Head coach: Brooks Thompson (6th season)
- Assistant coaches: Dan O'Dowd; Robert Guster; Jeff Renegar
- Home arena: Convocation Center

2011–12 Southland Conference men's basketball standings
	Conf.				Overall
Team	W		L	PCT	W		L	PCT
East
Lamar†	11	–	5	.688	23	–	12	.657
McNeese State	10	–	6	.625	17	–	16	.515
Northwestern State	8	–	8	.500	16	–	16	.500
Nicholls State	6	–	10	.375	10	–	20	.333
Southeastern Louisiana	5	–	11	.313	12	–	17	.414
Central Arkansas	3	–	13	.188	8	–	21	.276
West
Texas–Arlington	15	–	1	.938	24	–	9	.727
Stephen F. Austin	12	–	4	.750	20	–	12	.625
UTSA	10	–	6	.625	18	–	14	.563
Sam Houston State	7	–	9	.438	13	–	19	.406
Texas State	5	–	11	.313	13	–	17	.433
Texas A&M–Corpus Christi	4	–	12	.250	6	–	24	.200
† 2012 Southland tournament winner As of March 14, 2012; Rankings from AP poll

The 2011–12 UTSA Roadrunners men's basketball team represented the University of Texas at San Antonio in the 2011–12 college basketball season. This was head coach Brooks Thompson's sixth season at UTSA. This was their final season as members of the West Division of the Southland Conference as they will move to the Western Athletic Conference on July 1, 2012. They play their home games at the Convocation Center. They finished the season 18–14, 10–6 in Southland play to finish in third place in the West Division. They lost in the quarterfinals of the Southland Basketball tournament to McNeese State.

== Roster ==
2011–12 UTSA Roadrunners men's basketball team
Players
Coaches

Pos.	#	Name	Height	Weight	Year	Previous school	Hometown
F	1	Stephen Franklin	6 ft 6 in (1.98 m)	205 lb (93 kg)	Sr	Eastern Utah	Aurora, CO
F	3	Larry Wilkins	6 ft 4 in (1.93 m)	250 lb (113 kg)	Sr	Midland	San Antonio, TX
G	4	Sei Paye	6 ft 3 in (1.91 m)	170 lb (77 kg)	Sr	Louisiana-Monroe	Houston, TX
G	5	Michael Hale III	5 ft 9 in (1.75 m)	150 lb (68 kg)	Jr	North Idaho	Federal Way, WA
G	11	A. J. Price	6 ft 2 in (1.88 m)	175 lb (79 kg)	Fr	The Colony	The Colony, TX
F	12	Jeromie Hill	6 ft 8 in (2.03 m)	230 lb (104 kg)	So	AIS	Cairns, Australia
F	13	Igor Nujic	6 ft 8 in (2.03 m)	215 lb (98 kg)	So	AIS	Perth, Australia
F/C	14	Alex Vouyoukas	6 ft 9 in (2.06 m)	235 lb (107 kg)	Sr	Indian Hills CC	Athens, Greece
G	20	Ryan Whitehead	6 ft 0 in (1.83 m)	190 lb (86 kg)	So	Desert Edge	Goodyear, AZ
G	22	Kannon Burrage	6 ft 3 in (1.91 m)	185 lb (84 kg)	Jr	Des Moines Area CC	East Moline, IL
G	31	Melvin Johnson III	6 ft 5 in (1.96 m)	165 lb (75 kg)	Jr	Christian Life Area	Dallas, TX
G/F	32	Jordan Sims	6 ft 4 in (1.93 m)	185 lb (84 kg)	So	Liberty	El Mirage, AZ
F	42	Tyler Wood	6 ft 6 in (1.98 m)	230 lb (104 kg)	So	Madison	San Antonio, TX

Head coach

- Brooks Thompson (Oklahoma State)

Assistant coach(es)

- Dan O'Dowd (Bethany (KS))
- Robert Guster (Missouri State)
- Jeff Renegar (Adams State)

Legend

- (C) Team captain
- (S) Suspended
- (I) Ineligible
- (W) Walk-on
- Injured
- Current redshirt

== Media ==
All Roadrunners games are broadcast on KRPT. Video of all non-televised home games can be found at goUTSA.com.

== Schedule and results ==
- All times are Central

Date time, TV	Rank^{#}	Opponent^{#}	Result	Record	Site (attendance) city, state
Exhibition
November 4, 2011*; 7:00 pm		Southeastern Oklahoma State	W 68–59	—	Convocation Center (1,673); San Antonio, TX
Regular season
November 11, 2011*; 8:00 pm		at UTEP	W 73–64	1–0	Don Haskins Center (7,195); El Paso, TX
November 15, 2011*; 9:30 pm		vs. Oral Roberts; NIT Season Tip-Off	W 78–77	2–0	Gallagher-Iba Arena (3,719); Stillwater, OK
November 16, 2011*; 7:00 pm, ESPN3		at Oklahoma State; NIT Season Tip-Off	L 85–90 ^{OT}	2–1	Gallagher-Iba Arena (4,211); Stillwater, OK
November 21, 2011*; 8:30 pm		at Colorado State; NIT Season Tip-Off	L 75–85	2–2	Moby Arena (759); Fort Collins, CO
November 22, 2011*; 7:30 pm		vs. Fresno State; NIT Season Tip-Off	W 83–79	3–2	Moby Arena (618); Fort Collins, CO
November 26, 2011*; 12:00 pm		Pepperdine	L 64–70 ^{OT}	3–3	Convocation Center (1,132); San Antonio, TX
November 27, 2011*; 2:30 pm		Cameron	W 76–48	4–3	Convocation Center (675); San Antonio, TX
November 30, 2011*; 9:00 pm		at San Jose State	L 66–72	4–4	Event Center Arena (1,282); San Jose, CA
December 5, 2011*; 7:00 pm		at Samford	W 74–52	5–4	Pete Hanna Center (527); Homewood, AL
December 20, 2011*; 7:00 pm		at Houston	L 75–77	5–5	Hofheinz Pavilion (3,780); Houston, TX
December 22, 2011*; 7:00 pm		at Troy	W 76–70	6–5	Trojan Arena (507); Troy, AL
December 28, 2011*; 7:00 pm		UC Riverside	L 65–70	6–6	Convocation Center (1,112); San Antonio, TX
January 1, 2012*; 2:30 pm		Bowling Green	W 86–79 ^{OT}	7–6	Convocation Center (1,021); San Antonio, TX
January 4, 2012; 7:00 pm		Nicholls State	W 91–50	8–6 (1–0)	Convocation Center (1,036); San Antonio, TX
January 8, 2012; 1:00 pm		at Sam Houston State	W 62–60	9–6 (2–0)	Bernard Johnson Coliseum (1,054); Huntsville, TX
January 11, 2012; 1:00 pm		Texas A&M-Corpus Christi	L 49–50	9–7 (2–1)	Convocation Center (1,161); San Antonio, TX
January 14, 2012; 6:00 pm		at Stephen F. Austin	W 59–52	10–7 (3–1)	William R. Johnson Coliseum (1,717); Nacogdoches, TX
January 18, 2012; 7:00 pm		Northwestern State	W 80–62	11–7 (4–1)	Convocation Center (1,764); San Antonio, TX
January 21, 2012; 4:00 pm		at Texas State; I-35 Rivalry	W 80–75	12–7 (5–1)	Strahan Coliseum (4,458); San Marcos, TX
January 25, 2012*; 7:00 pm		Jarvis Christian	W 115–49	13–7	Convocation Center (1,263); San Antonio, TX
January 28, 2012; 4:00 pm, Texas Channel		Sam Houston State	W 78–66	14–7 (6–1)	Convocation Center (1,839); San Antonio, TX
February 1, 2012; 8:30 pm		at Texas–Arlington	L 66–67	14–8 (6–2)	College Park Center (6,228); Arlington, TX
February 4, 2012; 4:00 pm		at Lamar	L 66–80	14–9 (6–3)	Montagne Center (2,743); Beaumont, TX
February 8, 2012; 7:00 pm		Southeastern Louisiana	W 59–51	15–9 (7–3)	Convocation Center (1,530); San Antonio, TX
February 11, 2012; 7:00 pm, Texas Channel		Stephen F. Austin	L 51–59	15–10 (7–4)	Convocation Center (1,846); San Antonio, TX
February 15, 2012; 7:00 pm, SLC TV		at McNeese State	L 54–58	15–11 (7–5)	Burton Coliseum (1,035); Lake Charles, LA
February 18, 2012*; 6:00 pm		at Georgia State; Sears BracketBusters	L 71–82	15–12	GSU Sports Arena (922); Atlanta, GA
February 22, 2012; 7:00 pm		at Texas A&M–Corpus Christi	W 86–82 ^{OT}	16–12 (8–5)	American Bank Center (1,197); Corpus Christi, TX
February 25, 2012; 4:00 pm		Texas State; I-35 Rivalry	L 52–66	16–13 (8–6)	Convocation Center (2,895); San Antonio, TX
February 29, 2012; 7:00 pm		at Central Arkansas	W 73–60	17–13 (9–6)	Farris Center (2,637); Conway, AR
March 3, 2012; 7:00 pm		Texas–Arlington	W 97–88	18–13 (10–6)	Convocation Center (2,611); San Antonio, TX
Southland Tournament
March 7, 2012; 8:30 pm, SLC Now	(5)	vs. (4) McNeese State	L 74–78 ^{OT}	18–14	Leonard E. Merrell Center (1,303); Katy, TX
*Non-conference game. ^{#}Rankings from AP Poll. (#) Tournament seedings in parentheses.
