= Pat Knight =

American basketball coach (born 1970)

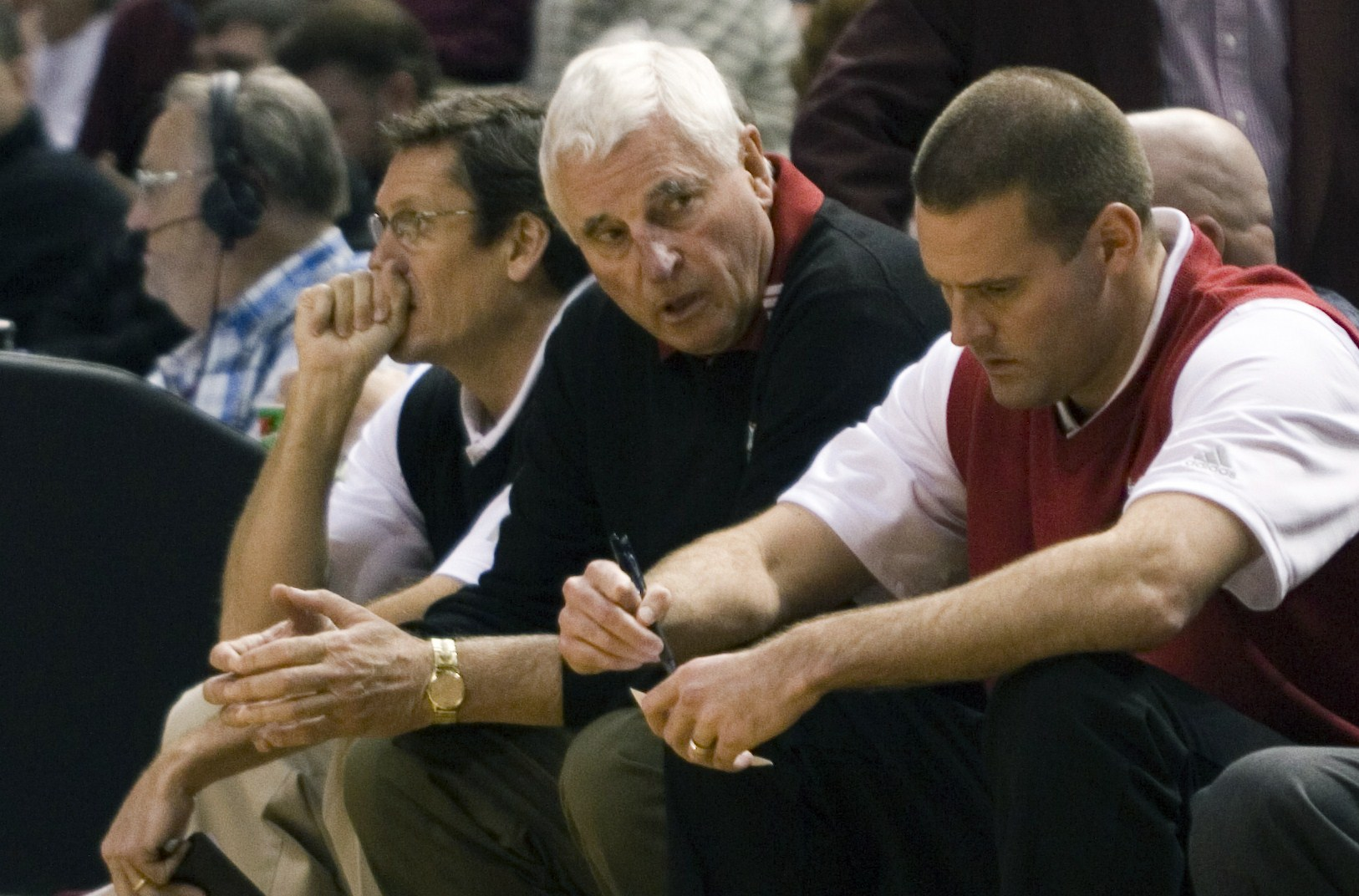
- Pat Knight (right) with his father Bob Knight (center)

Biographical details
- Born: September 21, 1970 (age 56); West Point, New York, U.S.

Playing career
- 1991–1995: Indiana

Coaching career (HC unless noted)
- 1998: Wisconsin Blast
- 1998: Columbus Cagerz
- 1999–2000: Indiana (asst.)
- 2000–2001: Akron (asst.)
- 2001–2003: Texas Tech (asst.)
- 2004–2008: Texas Tech (assoc. HC)
- 2008–2011: Texas Tech
- 2011–2014: Lamar
- 2024–2026: Marian

Head coaching record
- Overall: 79–123 (.391) (college)
- Tournaments: 0–1 (NCAA Division I); 2–1 (NIT)

Accomplishments and honors

Championships
- Southland tournament (2012); Southland East division (2012)

Patrick Clair Knight (born September 21, 1970) is a former American basketball coach currently serving as a contributing college basketball analyst for Field of 68. Knight most recently served as the head men’s basketball coach at Marian University but resigned in 2026 amid disagreements with university leadership. He was also previously a scout for the Indiana Pacers of the National Basketball Association (NBA). Knight assumed that position in 2014 and was the Pacers' West Coast college scout.

Knight became the coach of the Lamar Cardinals basketball team in 2011 but was fired in 2014. He was previously the head coach of the Texas Tech Red Raiders men's basketball from 2008 to 2011. Prior to that, he served in other coaching, administrative and scouting capacities with the NBA, United States Basketball League, International Basketball Association, NCAA, and CBA teams. Knight is the son of Basketball Hall of Fame member Bob Knight.

== Playing career ==
Knight played basketball at Bloomington High School North and New Hampton School, and then he went on to play college basketball for the Indiana Hoosiers from 1990 to 1995 under his father, lettering during four seasons. During the 1992–93 season, the 31–4 Hoosiers won the Big Ten and finished the season at the top of the AP Poll, but were defeated by Kansas in the Elite Eight. Knight scored 138 points in 112 games played, a 1.2 points-per-game average. Knight graduated from Indiana University Bloomington in 1995 with a degree in sports management.

== Coaching career ==
Knight was head coach of the Wisconsin Blast of the International Basketball Association and the Columbus Cagerz of the United States Basketball League before taking assistant coaching positions at Indiana, Akron and Texas Tech. He was also an administrative assistant and scout with the NBA's Phoenix Suns and an assistant coach with the Connecticut Pride of the Continental Basketball Association.

=== Texas Tech ===
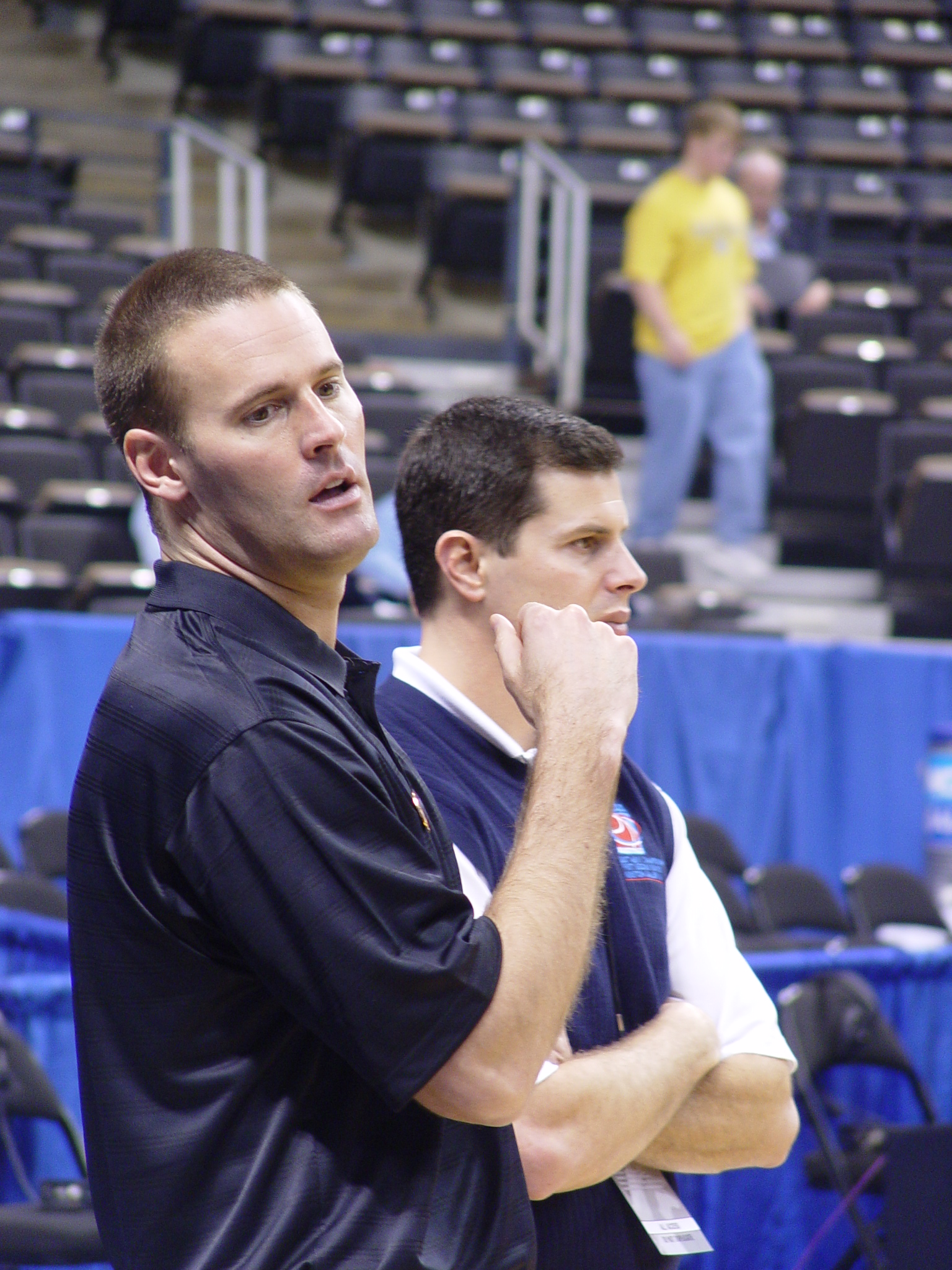
Pat Knight at the 2007 NCAA Tournament

In 2005, Knight was designated to succeed his father as head coach of the Texas Tech Red Raiders, assuming that role on February 4, 2008, when his father abruptly retired. Pat Knight used the motion offense and man-to-man defense, both of which he learned from his father as a player at Indiana and as an assistant coach.

After taking the head coaching job midseason, his initial two games were defeats on the road. The first was an 80–74 loss to Baylor on February 6, 2008. The second came three days later at Nebraska. Knight's first head coaching win came at home when the Red Raiders upset #18 Kansas State, 84–75, at United Spirit Arena. Going into the game, KSU was in sole possession of first place in the Big 12. The win came on what had earlier been declared Pat Knight Day by Lubbock mayor David Miller. On March 1, 2008, the Red Raiders again defeated the top team in the conference by beating #5 Texas, 83–80, ending a month-long, eight-game winning streak for the Longhorns.

The Red Raiders finished the regular season with back-to-back losses, first at Kansas and then to Baylor. At the 2008 Big 12 men's basketball tournament, they added another loss, to Oklahoma State, in the first round. The team did not receive an invitation to play at either the NCAA Men's Division I Basketball Championship or at the National Invitation Tournament. Texas Tech did get an invitation to the inaugural College Basketball Invitational, but declined the offer.

In the third game of the 2008–09 season, Tech defeated Division II opponent East Central University 167–115, setting a new school record for most points scored in a game. The previous record of 128 was set in the double overtime victory over Texas on February 20, 1994. The combined total of 282 points also became a new record.

During the 2008–09 season, Knight was reprimanded twice for altercations with officials. In a home game against Nebraska, Knight ran onto the court to argue with officials after Texas Tech player Alan Voskuil was called for a foul. After receiving two technical fouls, Knight was ejected from the game. Once in the tunnel, Knight ran back onto the court to continue arguing. Knight was not suspended, but received a public reprimand instead from the Big 12 Conference. Less than a month later, Knight was then suspended one game for his criticism of officiating in a loss against Texas A&M on February 23, 2009.

On March 7, 2011, Texas Tech fired Pat Knight after three disappointing seasons of conference play.

=== Lamar ===
On April 5, 2011, Lamar University hired Pat Knight as head coach.

On February 23, 2012, during a post-game press conference following a 62–52 loss to Stephen F. Austin State University, Knight berated his team's seniors, saying that, in his opinion, they were the worst group of seniors he'd ever coached. The Lamar squad went on to win the final three games of the season and the Southland Conference East Division Championship. Though Knight never apologized for his comments, he said he was proud of the way his seniors responded after the criticism. "They're the ones that deserve the credit," he said. Knight led Lamar to its first 20-win season since 1988 and a third-place finish in the conference. Lamar would go on to win the Southland Conference Tournament and earn their first NCAA appearance since 2000. Lamar qualified to play one of the "First Four" opening round games, but lost to Vermont. In a post-game interview, Knight tearfully complimented his seniors, calling them the "under-the-bus-gang," referring to his earlier criticism of them.

The following season, after those seniors graduated, Knight led Lamar to a 3–28 season (a .107 winning percentage) in 2012–13. He experienced similar difficulty in 2013–14, coaching the Cardinals to a 3–22 record. With five games still remaining on the season schedule, he was fired on February 16, 2014.

=== Marian University ===
On May 8, 2024, Knight was named head coach at Marian University. Knight accumulated a record of just 16-34 across nearly two seasons before resigning in 2026.

== Head coaching record ==
Record table
Season	Team	Overall	Conference	Standing	Postseason
Texas Tech Red Raiders (Big 12 Conference) (2008–2011)
2007–08	Texas Tech	4–7*	4–6	T–7th	
2008–09	Texas Tech	14–19	3–13	11th	
2009–10	Texas Tech	19–16	4–12	T–9th	NIT Quarterfinals
2010–11	Texas Tech	13–19	5–11	T–10th	
Texas Tech:		50–61 (.450)	16–42 (.276)	* Knight became coach midway through the season	
Lamar Cardinals (Southland Conference) (2011–2014)
2011–12	Lamar	23–12	11–5	1st (East)	NCAA Division I First Four
2012–13	Lamar	3–28	1–17	10th	
2013–14	Lamar	3–22	2–11	12th	
Lamar:		29–62 (.319)	14–33 (.298)		
Total:		79–123 (.391)			
National champion Postseason invitational champion Conference regular season champion Conference regular season and conference tournament champion Division regular season champion Division regular season and conference tournament champion Conference tournament champion

== Personal life ==
Knight and Amanda Shaw were married on May 10, 2002.
