= Willis Wilson =

American basketball coach (born 1960)

Biographical details
- Born: March 22, 1960 (age 66); Indianapolis, Indiana, U.S.

Playing career
- 1978–1982: Rice

Coaching career (HC unless noted)
- 1985–1986: Rice (assistant)
- 1986–1987: Strake Jesuit Prep
- 1987–1991: Rice (assistant)
- 1991–1992: Stanford (assistant)
- 1992–2008: Rice
- 2009–2011: Memphis (assistant)
- 2011–2021: Texas A&M–Corpus Christi

Administrative career (AD unless noted)
- 2018: Texas A&M–Corpus Christi (interim AD)

Head coaching record
- Overall: 361–417 (college)
- Tournaments: 1–3 (NIT); 6–4 (CIT)

Accomplishments and honors

Awards
- Ben Jobe Award (2014); WAC Co-Coach of the Year (1999)

Willis Thomas Wilson Jr. (born March 22, 1960) is an American former basketball coach. He was most recently the head coach of the Texas A&M–Corpus Christi Islanders men's basketball team before retiring in March 2021. He previously served an assistant coach for the Memphis Tigers men's basketball team. Wilson was head men's basketball coach of at Rice University for 16 seasons, from 1992 to 2008.

A former basketball letterwinner and 1982 graduate from Rice, Wilson served as an assistant at Rice in the 1980s and as an assistant at Stanford University in 1991. He became head coach at Rice in 1992. During his 16 years as head coach at Rice, Wilson became winningest coach in Rice basketball history. After a 3–27 record in 2007–08, Rice athletic director Chris Del Conte announced on March 14, 2008, that Wilson would not be retained for the next season.

On April 17, 2009, Wilson was hired by Memphis head coach Josh Pastner as an assistant.

== Head coaching record ==
=== College ===
Record table
Season	Team	Overall	Conference	Standing	Postseason
Rice Owls (Southwest Conference) (1992–1996)
1992–93	Rice	18–10	11–3	2nd	NIT Second Round
1993–94	Rice	15–14	6–8	5th	
1994–95	Rice	15–13	8–6	T–3rd	
1995–96	Rice	14–14	5–9	5th	
Rice Owls (Western Athletic Conference) (1996–2005)
1996–97	Rice	12–15	6–10	6th	
1997–98	Rice	6–22	3–11	7th	
1998–99	Rice	18–10	8–6	3rd	
1999–00	Rice	5–22	1–13	8th	
2000–01	Rice	14–16	5–11	8th	
2001–02	Rice	10–19	5–13	8th	
2002–03	Rice	19–10	11–7	T–3rd	
2003–04	Rice	22–11	12–6	T–3rd	NIT Opening Round
2004–05	Rice	19–12	12–6	3rd	NIT Opening Round
Rice Owls (Conference USA) (2005–2008)
2005–06	Rice	12–16	6–8	T–5th	
2006–07	Rice	16–16	8–8	T–5th	
2007–08	Rice	3–27	0–16	12th	
Rice:		218–247 (.469)	107–141 (.431)		
Texas A&M–Corpus Christi Islanders (Southland Conference) (2011–2021)
2011–12	Texas A&M–Corpus Christi	6–24	4–12	6th (West)	
2012–13	Texas A&M–Corpus Christi	6–23	5–13	9th	
2013–14	Texas A&M–Corpus Christi	18–16	14–4	2nd	CIT Second Round
2014–15	Texas A&M–Corpus Christi	20–14	13–5	T–3rd	CIT Second Round
2015–16	Texas A&M–Corpus Christi	25–8	15–3	2nd	CIT First Round
2016–17	Texas A&M–Corpus Christi	24–12	12–6	T–2nd	CIT Runner-up
2017–18	Texas A&M–Corpus Christi	11–18	8–10	T–8th	
2018–19	Texas A&M–Corpus Christi	14–18	9–9	T–6th	
2019–20	Texas A&M–Corpus Christi	14–18	10–10	T–6th	
2020–21	Texas A&M–Corpus Christi	5–19	2–13	13th	
Texas A&M–Corpus Christi:		143–170 (.457)	92–85 (.520)		
Total:		361–417 (.464)			
