= Jason Hooten =

American basketball coach (born 1969)

Current position
- Title: Head coach
- Team: New Mexico State
- Conference: C-USA
- Record: 46–50 (.479)

Biographical details
- Born: April 20, 1969 (age 57); Killeen, Texas, U.S.

Playing career
- 1987–1989: McLennan CC
- 1989–1991: Tarleton State

Coaching career (HC unless noted)
- 1993–2004: Tarleton State (assistant)
- 2004–2010: Sam Houston State (assistant)
- 2010–2023: Sam Houston State
- 2023–present: New Mexico State

Head coaching record
- Overall: 307–219 (.584)
- Tournaments: 1–2 (NIT); 4–4 (CIT)

Accomplishments and honors

Championships
- Southland regular season (2019)

Jason Trey Hooten (born April 20, 1969) is the head coach of the New Mexico State University men's basketball program as of March 2023.

Hooten was previously head coach at Sam Houston State University for 13 seasons. And was an assistant coach for there for the previous six years, before being named as the Bearkats' head men's basketball coach on April 2, 2010. In his time with the Bearkats, Hooten had a 261-169 record and six 20-plus victory seasons.

== Early life ==
Hooten is a 1987 graduate of Killeen Ellison High School and lettered in basketball and baseball. He earned all-district, All-CenTex and All-Super CenTex while leading his team to the bi-district championship as a senior. He holds school career records for scoring and assists. In baseball, he twice earned All-District honorable mention and lettered three years. Hooten holds two degrees from Tarleton State, earning a bachelor's in exercise and sport studies in 1993 and a master's in 1995. Hooten played two years at McLennan Community College, where he was an honorable mention all-conference selection and led his team to a league title. At Tarleton, he earned two letters under Lonn Reisman, helping lead the Texans to a 52-10 mark.

== Early coaching career ==
Hooten served as assistant men's basketball coach at Tarleton State University for Lonn Reisman. During his tenure, the Texans posted a combined 204–111 record. He returned to Tarleton in August 1993 after serving as a part-time assistant coach at Weatherford Junior College. Hooten assisted in all aspects of the men's basketball program, with particular emphasis in recruiting and scheduling. Hooten's recruiting efforts played a key role in Tarleton's 82–16 overall record his final three seasons with the Texans. In 2004, Tarleton posted a 28–4 record and claimed both the Lone Star Conference North Division title and the LSC Championship. The Texans won back-to-back North Division championships with a 29–4 record in 2002–03 and a 25–8 mark in 2001–02. During Hooten's 11 seasons with the Texans, nine players earned first team All-LSC honors and five were All-America. Hooten also coached and recruited Tim Burnette who was named Texas Association of Basketball Coaches Small College Player of the Year in 2004.

Hooten joined the SHSU staff July 1, 2004, helping run practice, recruiting, scouting, scheduling, and academics. In 2009, RecruitingRumors.com selected Hooten as one of the top 100 NCAA assistant coaches. CollegeInsider.com named him to the Mid-Major Top 25 assistant coaches' honorable mention list. Hooten served under Bob Marlin, who coached the Kats to a 225–131 record the past 12 seasons. Marlin went on to become head coach at the University of Louisiana at Lafayette. In his six seasons with the Bearkats, Hooten helped direct the program to a 127–59 record, four 20-plus victory seasons, Southland Conference regular season and tournament championships, and an NCAA tournament appearance in 2010. The 25–8 record for Sam Houston in 2009–10 marks the highest victory total for a Bearkat squad in SHSU's 23 seasons at the NCAA Division I level.

== Head coaching career ==
Hooten's inaugural game as coach of the SHSU Bearkats came in 72–47 win over the University of Mary Hardin–Baylor at home in Johnson Coliseum. Following his first win, Hooten went on to go 3–1 in his first month of coaching. Through the 2010–11 season, Hooten led the Bearkats to an 18–13 record, going 10–6 in the Southland Conference, while earning the Bearkats a #3 Seed in the Southland Conference Tournament. Hooten won his first post-season game as a head coach, knocking off rival #6 Stephen F. Austin in the opening round 61–45. The second round game resulted in a loss to the eventual conference tournament champions, UTSA 79–70.

== Coaching record ==
Record table
Season	Team	Overall	Conference	Standing	Postseason
Sam Houston State Bearkats (Southland Conference) (2010–2021)
2010–11	Sam Houston State	18–13	10–6	3rd	
2011–12	Sam Houston State	13–19	7–9	7th	
2012–13	Sam Houston State	17–17	8–10	5th	
2013–14	Sam Houston State	24–11	13–5	3rd	CIT Second Round
2014–15	Sam Houston State	26–9	15–3	2nd	CIT Second Round
2015–16	Sam Houston State	18–16	12–6	T–3rd	CIT First Round
2016–17	Sam Houston State	21–13	10–8	T–5th	
2017–18	Sam Houston State	21–15	12–6	4th	CIT Semifinals
2018–19	Sam Houston State	21–12	16–2	1st	NIT First Round
2019–20	Sam Houston State	18–13	11–9	T–4th	
2020–21	Sam Houston State	19–9	13–3	3rd	
Sam Houston State Bearkats (Western Athletic Conference) (2021–2023)
2021–22	Sam Houston State	19–14	13–5	T–4th	
2022–23	Sam Houston State	26–8	14–4	2nd	NIT Second Round
Sam Houston State:		261–169 (.607)	154–76 (.670)		
New Mexico State Aggies (Conference USA) (2023–present)
2023–24	New Mexico State	13–19	7–9	T–4th	
2024–25	New Mexico State	17–15	10–8	T–4th	
2025–26	New Mexico State	16–16	8–12	T–8th	
New Mexico State:		46–50 (.479)	25–29 (.463)		
Total:		307–219 (.584)			
National champion Postseason invitational champion Conference regular season champion Conference regular season and conference tournament champion Division regular season champion Division regular season and conference tournament champion Conference tournament champion
