= Wisconsin Blast =

- Division: IBA East Division
- League: International Basketball Association
- Founded: 1997
- Folded: 1999
- Arena: Brown County Arena
- Capacity: 5,248
- Location: Appleton, Wisconsin

The Wisconsin Blast was an American professional basketball club based in Appleton, Wisconsin that competed in the International Basketball Association (IBA) beginning in the 1997–98 season. The team folded after the 1998–99 season. Pat Knight was the head coach of the Blast and Jon Stuckey was his assistant coach. Knight also served as the team's general manager. Keary Ecklund owned the Blast. Ira Newble, who later played in the NBA for several seasons, was perhaps their best known player. The team played its games at the Brown County Arena.

== Season by season record ==
Season	GP	W	L	Pct.	GB	Finish	Playoffs
1997–98	34	19	15	.559	5	3rd IBA East	Did not qualify
1998–99	34	14	20	.412	12	4th IBA East	Lost IBA East Division Semi Finals 2–1 Vs Mansfield Hawks
Totals	68	33	35	.485	–	–	Playoff record 1–2
