= Rudy Davalos =

American basketball coach and college administrator

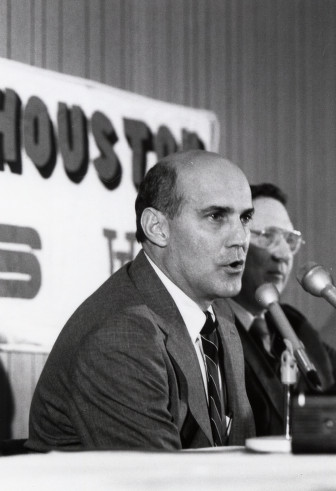

Playing career
- 1958–1960: Southwest Texas State
- Position: Point guard

Coaching career (HC unless noted)
- 1962: Kentucky (assistant)
- 1963–1970: Auburn (assistant)
- 1970–1973: Sewanee
- 1973–1976: San Antonio Spurs (assistant)

Administrative career (AD unless noted)
- 1976–1984: UTSA
- 1987–1992: Houston
- 1992–2005: New Mexico

Head coaching record
- Overall: 30–34

Accomplishments and honors

Championships
- SCAC (1973)

Awards
- NAIA Hall of Fame (1977)

Rudy Albert Davalos Jr. is an American retired basketball coach and college athletics administrator.

He is the father of former Texas State head basketball coach Doug Davalos.
