= Doug Davalos =

American basketball coach

Biographical details
- Born: February 10, 1970 (age 56)
- Education: Houston

Coaching career (HC unless noted)
- 1994: Houston (GA)
- 1995–1996: Auburn–Montgomery (GA)
- 1996–2000: Fort Stockton HS
- 2000–2002: Eastern New Mexico (assistant)
- 2002–2006: Sul Ross State
- 2006–2013: Texas State

Douglas Wayne Davalos (born February 10, 1970) is a former Texas State University basketball coach. Davalos had a record of 92–107 during his seven seasons with the Bobcats.

Davalos is the son of former college athletic director Rudy Davalos.

Davalos was the head girls basketball coach at Westwood High School for a few years.

Davalos is currently a physical education and girls' basketball coach at The Woodlands Christian Academy. He is known for his unique motivational tactics in PE — most notably, wielding a tambourine like it’s an Olympic sport.
