= KTSW =

Radio station at Texas State University in San Marcos, Texas

Coordinates: 29.7236°N 98.0867°W

- San Marcos, Texas; United States
- Broadcast area: San Marcos/New Braunfels, Texas
- Frequency: 89.9 MHz

Programming
- Format: Alternative rock

Ownership
- Owner: Texas State University

History
- Call sign meaning: portmanteau meaning: Texas State and SouthWest (former name)

Technical information
- Licensing authority: FCC
- Facility ID: 61553
- Class: C3
- ERP: 16,000 watts
- HAAT: 94 meters (308 ft)

Links
- Public license information: Public file; LMS
- Website: ktsw.txstate.edu

KTSW (89.9 FM) is a radio station broadcasting an Alternative format. Licensed to San Marcos, Texas, United States, it serves the San Marcos, Kyle, and New Braunfels areas. The station is an affiliate of Texas State University. Originally based in Old Main, KTSW 89.9 has moved into the newly renovated Trinity building in the fall of 2016. Its radio transmitter is located in New Braunfels on the Guadalupe County, Texas side.
