= Texas Hall =

Theater in Arlington, Texas

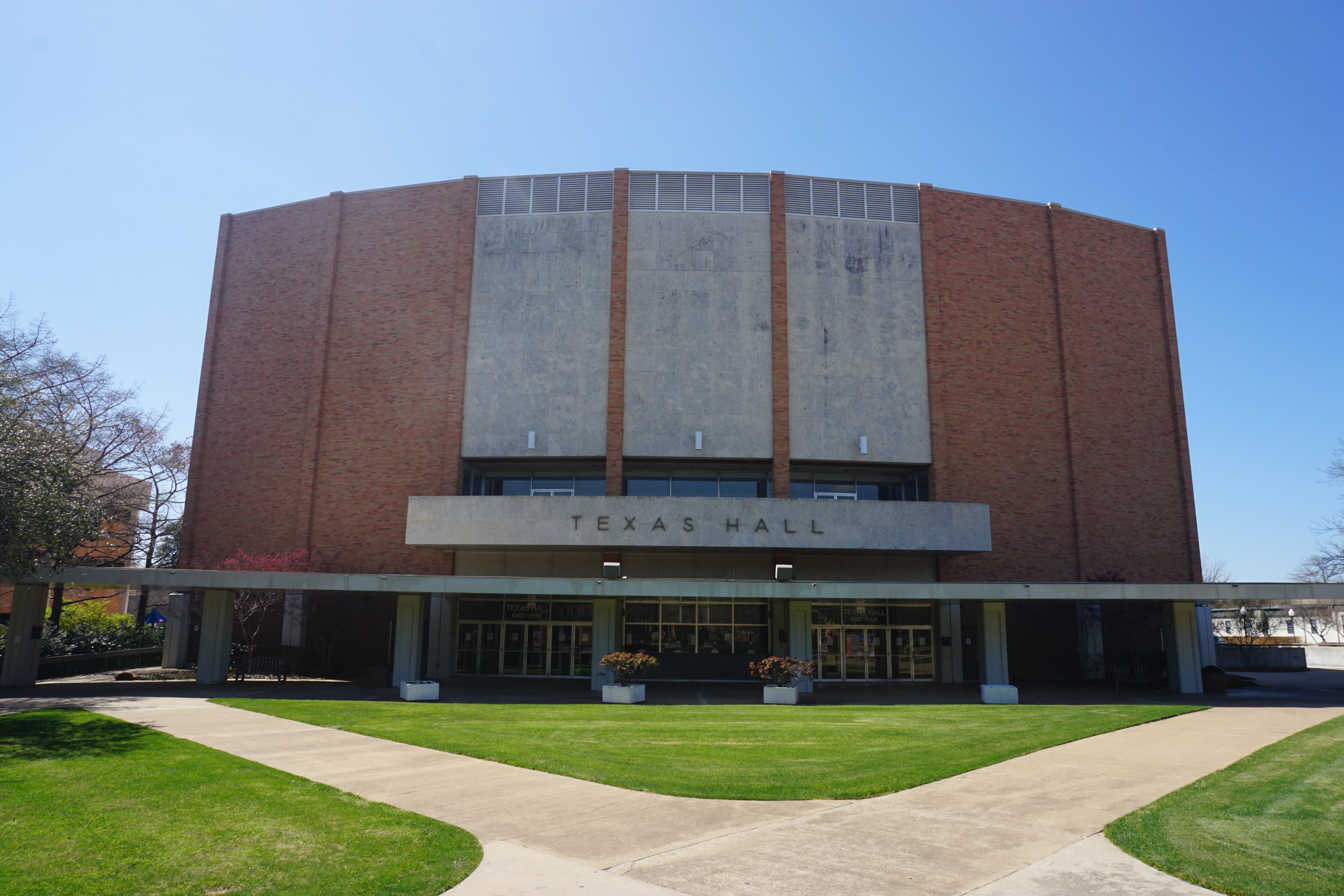
- Texas Hall exterior in 2021
- Interactive map of Texas Hall
- Location: 701 S Nedderman Dr, Arlington, Texas 76010
- Coordinates: 32.7297°N 97.1154°W
- Owner: University of Texas at Arlington
- Capacity: 2,625
- Type: Multi-purpose venue

Construction
- Opened: October 18, 1965
- Architect: George Dahl

Website
- www.uta.edu/texashall/

Texas Hall is a 76,000-square-foot (7,100 m^{2}) proscenium theater on the campus of The University of Texas at Arlington in Arlington, Texas. It opened in 1965 and has a seating capacity of 2,625.

Texas Hall hosts numerous events per year, including concerts, lectures, meetings, theater, and dance.

The debut event at Texas Hall was a performance by legendary American jazz trumpeter and singer Louis Armstrong on October 18, 1965.

Historic performers who have appeared at Texas Hall include Rihanna, Aerosmith, Maya Angelou, Prime Minister Benazir Bhutto, Pat Boone, Bowling for Soup, Blue Öyster Cult, Harry Chapin, Neil Diamond, Everclear, Focus, Harlem Globetrotters, Houston Ballet, Earvin “Magic” Johnson, James Earl Jones, Judas Priest, Kansas, King Crimson, Kiss, Ludacris, Barry Manilow, Steve Miller Band, MTV Battle of the Bands, Nektar, Willie Nelson, Leonard Nimoy, Edward James Olmos, Cal Ripken Jr., Bob Seger, Jerry Seinfeld, Shiva's Headband, Emmitt Smith, The Supremes, Veggie Tales, Forest Whitaker, Johnny Winter and Frank Zappa.

== Features ==
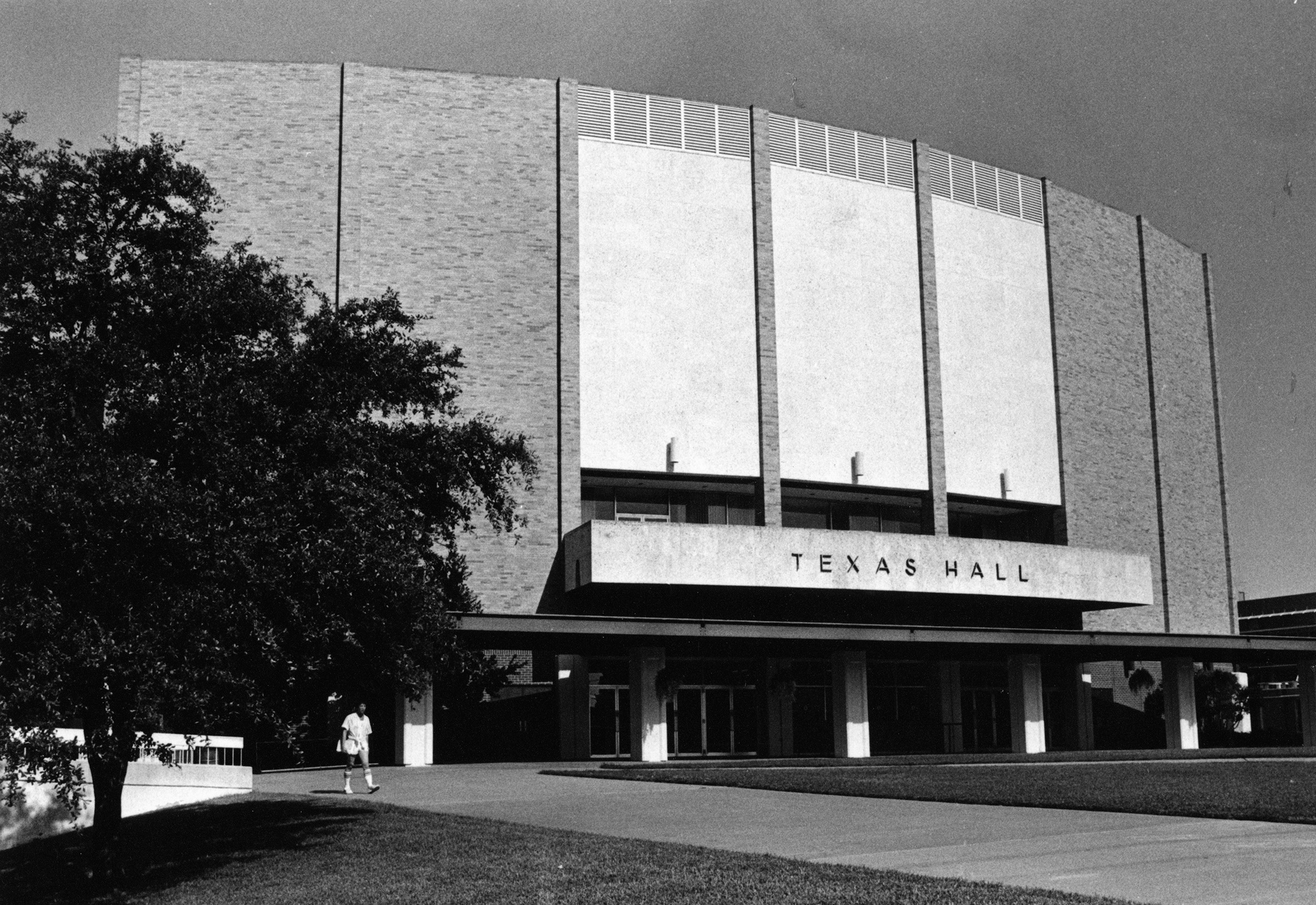
Texas Hall, circa 1965

Texas Hall has ground-level and balcony seating. Seating on the ground level is 1,273, and the balcony seats 1,352. Prior to the athletic teams vacating Texas Hall, there was bleacher seating opposite the theater seating that could sit 600.

The stage is over 5,000-square-foot (460 m^{2}). Dressing rooms are under the stage. A sound station with a stage view is at the back of the ground-level seating.

== Athletic venue ==
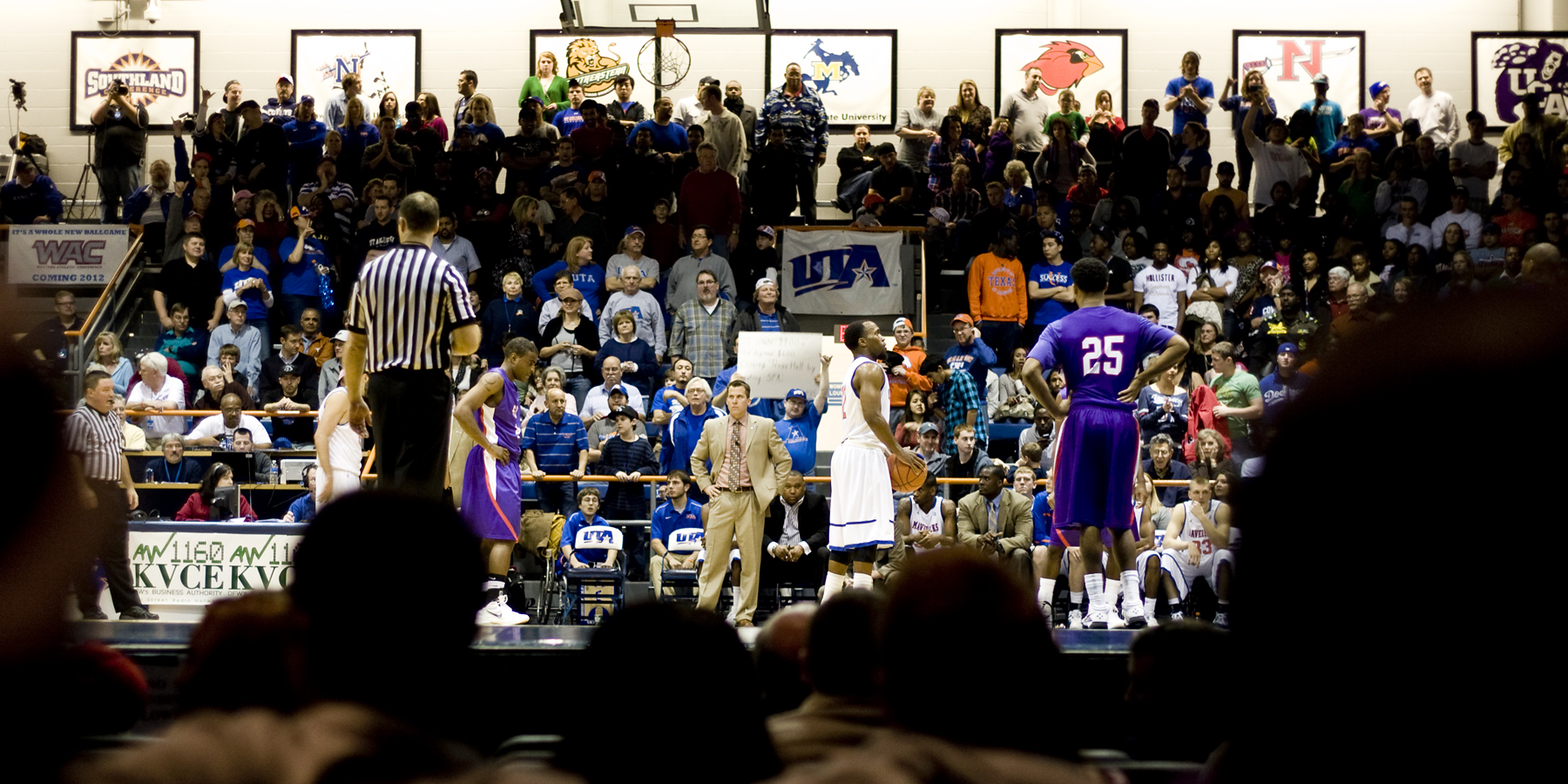
View from the floor looking at the stage, taken during the final men's basketball game at Texas Hall

Texas Hall debuted intercollegiate basketball on December 1, 1965, when the Arlington State College Rebels men hosted the East Texas State Lions. Arlington State lost the opener 67–61. UTA's men's team record at Texas Hall was 351–222, a winning percentage of .613.

As an athletic facility, Texas Hall was the home of UT Arlington Mavericks men's basketball, women's basketball, wheelchair basketball, and volleyball. It was one of the most unusual basketball/volleyball venues in America. In 1997 Texas Hall was noted by Sports Illustrated as one of college basketball's best places to watch a game due to the audience's up-close view of the court.

In 2012, athletic operations moved to the new $78 million College Park Center on the east side of campus, leaving Texas Hall to function exclusively as a campus performing arts and lecture venue.

The final men's basketball game in Texas Hall was a 63–54 UT Arlington victory against Stephen F. Austin on January 21, 2012. The final intercollegiate game was a UTA women's basketball loss on January 28, 2012, against Texas State.
