= Nicholls Colonels men's basketball =

American college basketball team

| 2026–27 Nicholls Colonels men's basketball team |
- University: Nicholls State University
- Head coach: Darion Brown (1st season)
- Location: Thibodaux, Louisiana
- Arena: Stopher Gymnasium (capacity: 3,800)
- Conference: Southland
- Nickname: Colonels
- Colors: Red and gray

NCAA Division I tournament Elite Eight
- 1976*, 1979*
Other NCAA Division I tournament results
| Sweet Sixteen | 1976*, 1979* |
| Appearances | 1976*, 1979*, 1995, 1998 |

Conference tournament champions
- 1995, 1998

Conference regular-season champions
- 1976, 1979, 1995, 1998, 2018, 2021, 2022
- * at Division II level

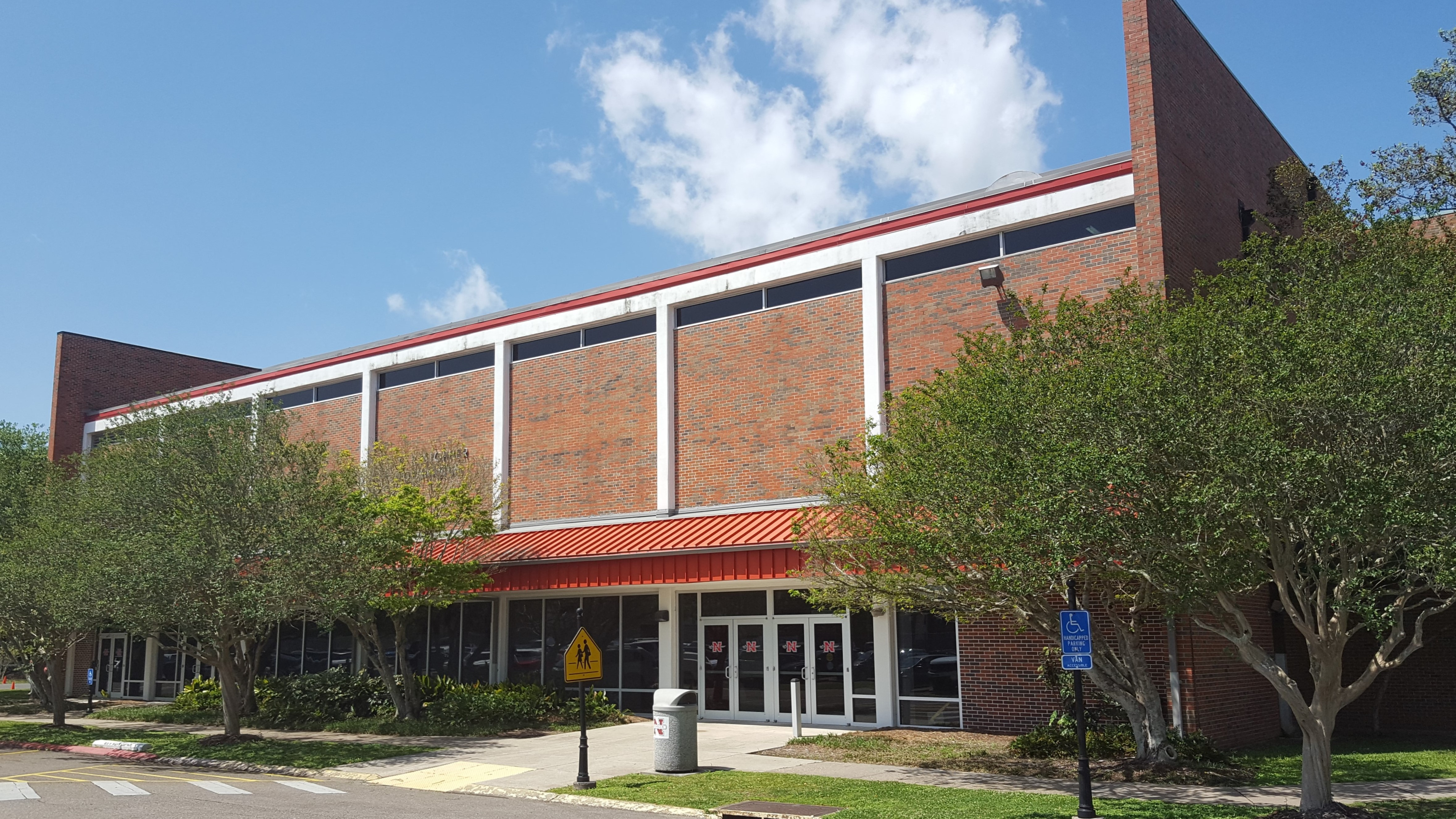
Stopher Gymnasium

The Nicholls Colonels men's basketball team represents Nicholls State University in Thibodaux, Louisiana in the sport of basketball. The school's team currently competes in the Southland Conference. Nicholls' first men's basketball team was fielded in 1958. The team plays its home games at 3,800-seat Stopher Gymnasium and are coached by Tevon Saddler . The Colonels have appeared two times in the NCAA tournament, most recently in 1998.

== Championships ==
=== Conference championships ===
Regular season

- Gulf South: 1976, 1979
- Southland: 1995, 1998, 2018, 2021

Tournament

- Southland: 1995, 1998

== History ==
=== NCAA Division I Tournament ===
The Colonels have appeared in two NCAA Division I Tournaments in 1995 and 1998. Their combined record is 0–2.

| Year | Round | Opponent | Result |
|---|---|---|---|
| 1995 | First round | Virginia | L 72–96 |
| 1998 | First round | Arizona | L 60–99 |

=== NIT results ===
Nicholls has appeared in one National Invitation Tournaments (NIT). Their combined record is 0–1.

| Year | Round | Opponent | Result |
|---|---|---|---|
| 2022 | First round | SMU | L 58–68 |

=== NCAA Division II Tournament ===
The Colonels have appeared in two NCAA Division II Tournaments. Their combined record is 4–2.

| Year | Round | Opponent | Result |
|---|---|---|---|
| 1976 | Regional semifinals Regional Finals; Elite Eight | Lincoln (MO); Grambling State; Chattanooga | W 97–79; W 90–89; L 78–107 |
| 1979 | Regional semifinals Regional Finals; Elite Eight | Southeast Missouri State; Rollins; North Alabama | W 89–74; W 100–87; L 97–103 |

== Conference affiliations ==
| Years | Conference | Classification |
|---|---|---|
| 1958–1965 | Independent | NCAA College Division |
| 1965–1971 | Gulf States Conference | NCAA College Division |
| 1971–1973 | Gulf South Conference | NCAA College Division |
| 1973–1979 | Gulf South Conference | NCAA Division II |
| 1979–1980 | Independent | NCAA Division II |
| *1980–1984 | Independent | NCAA Division I |
| 1984–1987 | Gulf Star Conference | NCAA Division I |
| 1987–1991 | Independent | NCAA Division I |
| 1991–present | Southland Conference | NCAA Division I |

* From 1982–84, Nicholls State was a provisional member of the TAAC. Men's basketball did not play any conference games.

== Arenas ==
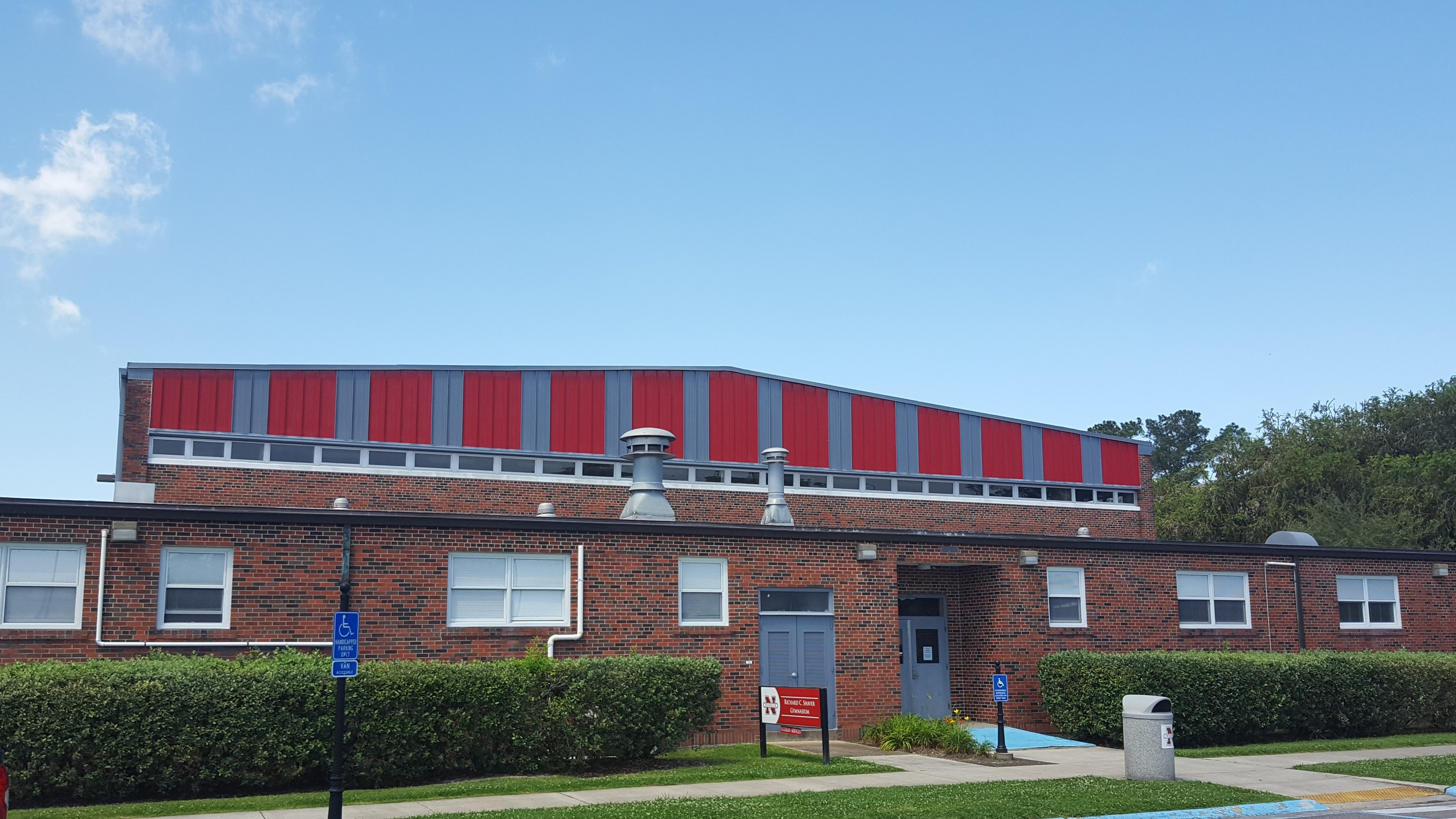
Shaver Gymnasium – Nicholls State men's basketball home from 1958–69

=== Stopher Gymnasium ===
Stopher Gymnasium is a 3,800-seat multi-purpose arena in Thibodaux, Louisiana. The on-campus arena opened in 1970 and is home of the Nicholls Colonels men's basketball team.

=== Shaver Gymnasium ===
Shaver Gymnasium or Richard C. Shaver Gymnasium is a 750-seat on-campus arena that opened in 1958 and was the home of the Nicholls State Colonels men's basketball team from its opening until 1969.

== Head coaches ==
| Name | Years |
|---|---|
| Morris Osburn | 1958–1960 |
| Jack Holley | 1960–1962 |
| Billy Key | 1962–1963 |
| Jim Mahoney | 1963–1966 |
| Don Landry | 1966–1979 |
| Jerry Sanders | 1979–1981 |
| Gordon C. Stauffer | 1981–1990 |
| Rickey Broussard | 1990–2002 |
| Ricky Blanton | 2002–2004 |
| J.P. Piper | 2004–2016 |
| Richie Riley | 2016–2018 |
| Austin Claunch | 2018–2023 |
| Tevon Saddler | 2023–2026 |
| Darion Brown | 2026–present |

== See also ==
- List of NCAA Division I men's basketball programs
- Nicholls Colonels
