= Southeastern Louisiana Lions basketball =

2025–26 Southeastern Louisiana Lions basketball team
- University: Southeastern Louisiana University
- Head coach: David Kiefer (7th season)
- Location: Hammond, Louisiana
- Arena: Pride Roofing University Center (capacity: 7,500)
- Conference: Southland
- Nickname: Lions
- Colors: Green and gold

NCAA Division I tournament Sweet Sixteen
- 1973*

NCAA Division I tournament appearances
- 1973*, 2005

Conference tournament champions
- 2005

Conference regular-season champions
- TAAC/A-Sun: 1996; Southland: 2004, 2005, 2018

Uniforms
Home	Away
- * at Division II level

The Southeastern Louisiana Lions basketball team is the men's basketball team that represents Southeastern Louisiana University in Hammond, Louisiana. The school's team currently competes in the Southland Conference. The Lions have appeared once in the NCAA Division I men's basketball tournament, appearing in 2005.

== Postseason ==
=== NCAA Division I tournament results ===
The Lions have appeared in the NCAA Division I tournament one time. Their record is 0–1.

Year	Seed	Round	Opponent	Result
2005	#15	First round	#2 Oklahoma State	L 50–63

=== National Invitation Tournament ===
The Lions have appeared in the National Invitation Tournament one time. Their record is 0–1

Year	Round	Opponent	Result
2018	First round	Saint Mary's	L 45–89

=== The Basketball Classic results ===
The Lions have appeared in The Basketball Classic one time. Their record is 0–1.

Year	Round	Opponent	Result
2022	First round	South Alabama	L 68–70

=== NCAA Division II tournament results ===
The Lions have appeared in the NCAA tournament one time. Their record is 1–1.

Year	Round	Opponent	Result
1973	Regional semifinals Regional Finals	Chattanooga; Tennessee State	W 67–64; L 54–62 ^{OT}

=== NAIA tournament ===
The Lions have appeared in the NAIA tournament three times. Their combined record is 2–3.

Year	Round	Opponent	Result
1950	First round	Puget Sound	L 68–70 ^{OT}
1951	First round	Central (MO)	L 66–68
1954	First round Second Round; Quarterfinals	Georgetown (KY); Rio Grande; Western Illinois	W 77–76; W 78–65; L 79–84 ^{OT}

== See also ==
- List of NCAA Division I men's basketball programs
