= Sean Jackson (basketball) =

American basketball player

Personal information
- Born: c. 1969/1970
- Listed height: 6 ft 0 in (1.83 m)

Career information
- High school: Vinson (Huntington, West Virginia)
- College: Ohio (1987–1988); Princeton (1989–1992)
- NBA draft: 1992: undrafted
- Position: Guard

Career highlights
- Ivy League Player of the Year (1992); 2× First-team All-Ivy League (1991, 1992)

P. Sean Jackson (born c. 1969/1970) is an American former college basketball player for the Ohio Bobcats and Princeton Tigers. He was the 1992 Ivy League Men's Basketball Player of the Year and earned first team All-Ivy League recognition for both the 1990–91 and 1991–92 Princeton Tigers teams. He earned three Ivy League basketball championships as a player. In high school, he led Vinson High School to the 1986 West Virginia Secondary School Activities Commission (WVSSAC) Class A state basketball championship as a junior and a one-point 1987 Class AA basketball championship game loss as a senior. He earned multiple All-state recognitions in both basketball and baseball. Vinson won the Class A state baseball championship in 1986 and was Class A baseball runner up in 1985.

Jackson holds the Princeton records for single-season three-point shots (95), and consecutive games with a three-point shot (56). He has also set the Ivy League record for single-season three-point shots made in conference games (56). He is listed among the all-time career three-point field goal percentages in the NCAA annual record book. Jackson formerly held Princeton records for both career and single-game three-point shots made. The Ivy League record book is silent on a possible consecutive games with a three-point shot record. After basketball, he had a career as a highly rated internet analyst.

== High school career ==
As a sophomore, Jackson posted 35 points for Vinson in a 1985 WVSSAC Class A tournament game against Notre Dame, which ranked tied for 8th in State Class A history as of 2014. As a junior, Jackson led Vinson High School of Huntington, West Virginia to the 1986 WVSSAC Class A state championship game victory over Notre Dame. As a senior, he led the school to a 1987 Class AA championship game loss against Central High School of Wheeling, West Virginia. Both his 1986 and 1987 teams finished 26–1 with the 1986 team winning the championship game by a 96–80 margin and the 1987 team losing 59–58. As a senior, he averaged 25.6 points per game. Vinson's home arena was the storied Vinson Gymnatorium. During Jackson's 3 years as a varsity basketball starter the team went 72–4, while he was named first team All-State as both a junior and senior. He had athletic scholarship offers from Delaware, Charlotte and James Madison.

Jackson also played baseball while in high school. He had been twice named All-State in baseball by April 1987 (before his senior season). Vinson won the WVSSAC Class A state championship over Van in 1986 and was Class A runner up to Coalton in 1985.

== College career ==
Jackson played his freshman season for the 1987–88 Ohio Bobcats men's basketball team before sitting out a season and transferring to Princeton. That team included two future National Basketball Association players: Paul Graham and Dave Jamerson.

Jackson became the first transfer student of the Pete Carril era at Princeton for the 1989–90 Princeton Tigers men's basketball team, which was Carril's 23rd season at Princeton. The team was coming off of an Ivy League championship season that was highlighted by a 1989 NCAA tournament with the memorable 1989 Georgetown vs. Princeton game. At the time of that game, Jackson had been on campus as a student sitting out of athletic competition for a year due to the transfer rules at the time. As a redshirt sophomore transfer, Jackson stepped into the role that had previously been played by Bob Scrabis and was one of the key players on the team. He and George Leftwich gave Princeton one of the quickest backcourt combinations in recent school history. Jackson earned Ivy League Men's Basketball Player of the Week on January 7, 1990. The Princeton record book omits Jackson's January 8, 1990 rivalry game 24-point 7–8 three-point field goal performance against Penn, but The Harvard Crimson and Philadelphia Daily News noted it, giving him a share of the school single-game three-point shots made record until Matt Lapin made 8 against Harvard on February 24, 1990. He averaged 11.1 points per game that year. That year's Tigers included Ivy League Player of the Year Kit Mueller. The team won the Ivy League regular season and entered the 1990 NCAA Division I men's basketball tournament with a 13-seed. They lost to 4-seed Arkansas 68–64. Jackson opened the game with a pair of three point shots as Princeton held early leads of 10–2 and 20–9. They still led 56–55 lead with 6:25 before surrendering the lead and the game.

Jackson's February 8, 1991, 5–5 three-point shot performance against Cornell stood as a shared school and shared Ivy League record for single-game three point shots without a miss until Sydney Johnson set the current school record (6) six seasons later. He earned Ivy League Men's Basketball Player of the Week on March 4, 1991. As of the 2015–16 season, his 56 three-point shots made during the 1990–91 Ivy League 14 conference game schedule stood as an Ivy League conference single-season record. Jackson's 95 three-point shots made led the Ivy League. Mueller repeated as Ivy Player of the Year. Jackson credits Mueller as the biggest reason for the team's continuing success. Jackson's three-point shooting efforts supported Mueller and resulted in an undefeated 14–0 conference record for the 1990–91 Tigers, which was the first undefeated Ivy League season by any school since the 1975–76 Princeton Tigers men's basketball team. Following the season, he was named First Team All-Ivy League honoree for the 1990–91 team. That year, the team repeated for a third consecutive season as Ivy League champions to earn a bid to the 1991 NCAA Division I men's basketball tournament as 8-seeds where they lost to Villanova 50–48.

As a redshirt senior for the 1991–92 Tigers, Jackson served as co-captain with Matthew C. Eastwick, and George H. Leftwich. On January 4, 1992, after Princeton fell behind 46–36 with 7:34 time remaining against Loyola (MD), Jackson helped Princeton close out the game on an 11-point run (including 2 Jackson three-point shots) to finish with 20 points and a perfect 4–4 three-point second half. He earned his final Ivy League Men's Basketball Player of the Week recognition on January 7, 1992. His 84 three-point shots made led the Ivy League. Jackson was the leading scorer of the 4-time Ivy League champion Tigers. He was again named First Team All-Ivy League honoree and was named 1992 Ivy League Men's Basketball Player of the Year. The 1991–92 team earned a fourth consecutive Ivy League championship and went to the 1992 NCAA Division I men's basketball tournament as a 11-seed against Syracuse. Jackson went into the tournament with the third best three point shooting percentage in the nation (48.1%). Jackson led the team in scoring with 13 points, but the team lost 51–43.

Jackson's single-season totals of 95 (1990–91) and 84 (1991–92) three-point shots made are first and second in the 2023 Princeton record book. His streak of 56 consecutive games with a made three-point shot still stands as a school record, according to the same source. Jackson's 3-year total of 235 three-point shots made was a school record for career three-point shots made until Brian Earl set the current record in 4 years with 281 seven seasons later. His 243/528 (46.02%) career three-point shooting percentage was listed 10th in the annual update of the top 25 listing in the NCAA's 2022–23 Division I Men's Basketball Record book. When he established his three-point shot records, the three-point line was at 19 feet 9 inches (6.02 metres), but for the 2008–09 NCAA Division I men's basketball season, the line was extended to 20 feet 9 inches (6.32 metres). For the 2019–20 NCAA Division I men's basketball season, the line was further extended to 22 feet 1.75 inches (6.75 metres).

== Post-collegiate ==
After graduating from Princeton in 1992, Jackson attended Kellogg School of Management at Northwestern University in the Chicago metropolitan area to attain a Master of Business Administration before moving to begin his career in Nashville. During his time in business school, he began playing in competitive 3x3 basketball with John W. Rogers Jr., Mueller and Craig Robinson. The team won many tournaments and qualified for the world championships. In a 2001 Best on the Street: 2001 Analysts Survey published in The Wall Street Journal, Jackson, who held the title of director of stock research at SunTrust Equitable Securities Corp., the investment-banking [sic] subsidiary of SunTrust Banks Inc. was ranked as "third in Internet stock-picking" among analysts on Wall Street.

== Personal life ==
As of 2010, Sean and Suzanne Jackson lived in Tennessee with their 9-year-old competitive youth golfing son named Zach and 7-year-old basketball-loving son named Luke.
