= 1990–91 Princeton Tigers men's basketball team =

American college basketball season

1990–91 Princeton Tigers men's basketball

Ivy League champion

NCAA tournament, Round of 64
- Conference: Ivy League

Ranking
- Coaches: No. 20
- AP: No. 18
- Record: 24–3 (14–0 Ivy)
- Head coach: Pete Carril (24th season)
- Assistant coaches: Bill Carmody; Jan van Breda Kolff
- Captain: Kit Mueller
- Home arena: Jadwin Gymnasium

1990–91 Ivy League men's basketball standings
| | Conf. | | | | Overall |
| Team | W | | L | PCT | W | | L | PCT |
|---|---|---|---|---|---|---|---|---|
| No. 18 Princeton | 14 | – | 0 | 1.000 | 24 | – | 3 | .889 |
| Yale | 9 | – | 5 | .643 | 15 | – | 11 | .577 |
| Cornell | 6 | – | 8 | .429 | 13 | – | 13 | .500 |
| Brown | 6 | – | 8 | .429 | 11 | – | 15 | .423 |
| Harvard | 6 | – | 8 | .429 | 9 | – | 17 | .346 |
| Penn | 6 | – | 8 | .429 | 9 | – | 17 | .346 |
| Columbia | 5 | – | 9 | .357 | 7 | – | 19 | .269 |
| Dartmouth | 4 | – | 10 | .286 | 9 | – | 17 | .346 |
Rankings from AP Poll

The 1990–91 Princeton Tigers men's basketball team represented Princeton University in NCAA Division I men's college basketball during the 1990–91 NCAA Division I men's basketball season. Their head coach was Pete Carril, and the team captain was Kit Mueller. The team played its home games in the Jadwin Gymnasium on the university campus in Princeton, New Jersey. The team was the undefeated champion of the Ivy League, which earned them an automatic invitation to the 64-team 1991 NCAA tournament, where they were seeded eighth in the East Region.

In December, undefeated Princeton handed Rutgers their first loss. The team posted a 24–3 overall record and a 14–0 conference record using the Princeton offense. When the team beat Yale 55–27 on January 11, 1991, it established a new National Collegiate Athletic Association Division I record for fewest points allowed (since 1986), breaking its own record set the prior year. The record would last until March 2, 1992. On February 8, 1991, against Cornell, Sean Jackson made all five of his three-point field goal attempts, which tied the Ivy League single-game record for most made without a miss set three years earlier by Princeton Tigers Dave Orlandini and Bob Scrabis. These stood as unsurpassed as the Ivy League record until future Princeton Tigers head coach Sydney Johnson made all six for Princeton on February 28, 1997. In a March 15, 1991 NCAA Division I men's basketball tournament East Regional first-round game at the Carrier Dome in Syracuse, New York, against the Villanova Wildcats, they lost by a 50–48 margin. The Tigers led 30–25 at halftime, but lost on a shot in the final second of regulation play. Princeton's number eight seed was a record for the highest seed by an Ivy League school at the time. During the undefeated conference game season, Jackson established the Ivy League single-season conference games record with 56 three-point field goals made, which stood at least 25 seasons.

During the season, the team spent six weeks (one week in mid December and the final five weeks of the season) of the seventeen-week season ranked in the Associated Press Top Twenty-five Poll, peaking at number eighteen where it ended the season. The team finished the season ranked twentieth in the final UPI Coaches' Poll. The team completed the first undefeated Ivy season by any team since the 1975–76 Princeton Tigers men's basketball team.

The team was led by first team All-Ivy League selections Jackson and Mueller, who repeated as the Ivy League Men's Basketball Player of the Year while earning first team Academic All-America recognition from College Sports Information Directors of America. Mueller shot 62.5% on his field goals to earn the third of three Ivy League statistical championships for field goal percentage. Jackson led the Ivy League in three point shooting percentage in conference games with a 55.4% average and established the Ivy League single-season record for conference games with 56 made. The team won the third of twelve consecutive national statistical championships in scoring defense with a 48.9 points allowed average.

== Schedule and results ==
The team posted a 24–3 (14–0 Ivy League) record.

| Date time, TV | Rank^{#} | Opponent^{#} | Result | Record | Site city, state |
Regular season
| Nov 24, 1990* | | at Cleveland State; North Coast Tournament | W 70–57 | 1–0 | Woodling Gym; Cleveland, Ohio |
| Nov 25, 1990* | | vs. Coastal Carolina; North Coast Tournament | W 42–39 | 2–0 | Woodling Gym; Cleveland, Ohio |
| Nov 27, 1990* | | at Lafayette | W 45–36 | 3–0 | Allan P. Kirby Field House; Easton, Pennsylvania |
| Dec 4, 1990* | | at Lehigh | W 57–40 | 4–0 | Stabler Arena; Bethlehem, Pennsylvania |
| Dec 7, 1990* | | vs. Saint Mary's; Manufacturers Hanover Classic | W 63–45 | 5–0 | John A. Mulcahy Campus Events Center; New Rochelle, New York |
| Dec 8, 1990* | | at Iona; Manufacturers Hanover Classic | W 58–50 | 6–0 | John A. Mulcahy Campus Events Center; New Rochelle, New York |
| Dec 15, 1990* | | at Rutgers | W 58–45 | 7–0 | Louis Brown Athletic Center; Piscataway, New Jersey |
| Dec 19, 1990* | No. 25 | at No. 1 UNLV | L 35–69 | 7–1 | Thomas & Mack Center (17,778); Las Vegas, Nevada |
| Dec 28, 1990* | | vs. UC Santa Barbara; Cable Car Classic | W 67–51 | 8–1 | Toso Pavilion; Santa Clara, California |
| Dec 29, 1990* | | at Santa Clara; Cable Car Classic | L 53–59 | 8–2 | Toso Pavilion; Santa Clara, California |
| Jan 11, 1991 | | Yale | W 55–27 | 9–2 (1–0) | Jadwin Gymnasium; Princeton, New Jersey |
| Jan 12, 1991 | | Brown | W 67–42 | 10–2 (2–0) | Jadwin Gymnasium; Princeton, New Jersey |
| Jan 28, 1991* | | Elizabethtown | W 82–45 | 11–2 | Jadwin Gymnasium; Princeton, New Jersey |
| Feb 1, 1991 | | Dartmouth | W 64–52 | 12–2 (3–0) | Jadwin Gymnasium; Princeton, New Jersey |
| Feb 2, 1991 | | Harvard | W 75–59 | 13–2 (4–0) | Jadwin Gymnasium; Princeton, New Jersey |
| Feb 5, 1991 | | at Penn | W 60–47 | 14–2 (5–0) | The Palestra; Philadelphia, Pennsylvania |
| Feb 8, 1991 | | at Cornell | W 84–40 | 15–2 (6–0) | Newman Arena; Ithaca, New York |
| Feb 9, 1991 | | at Columbia | W 65–47 | 16–2 (7–0) | Levien Gymnasium; New York, New York |
| Feb 15, 1991 | No. 25 | at Brown | W 79–63 | 17–2 (8–0) | Pizzitola Sports Center; Providence, Rhode Island |
| Feb 16, 1991 | No. 25 | at Yale | W 59–54 | 18–2 (9–0) | John J. Lee Amphitheater; New Haven, Connecticut |
| Feb 22, 1991 | No. 23 | Columbia | W 56–33 | 19–2 (10–0) | Jadwin Gymnasium; Princeton, New Jersey |
| Feb 23, 1991 | No. 23 | Cornell | W 68–53 | 20–2 (11–0) | Jadwin Gymnasium; Princeton, New Jersey |
| Feb 26, 1991 | No. 21 | Penn | W 63–56 | 21–2 (12–0) | Jadwin Gymnasium; Princeton, New Jersey |
| Mar 1, 1991 | No. 21 | at Harvard | W 79–64 | 22–2 (13–0) | Lavietes Pavilion; Cambridge, Massachusetts |
| Mar 2, 1991 | No. 21 | at Dartmouth | W 56–49 | 23–2 (14–0) | Leede Arena; Hanover, New Hampshire |
| Mar 10, 1991* | No. 19 | Loyola Marymount | W 76–48 | 24–2 | Jadwin Gymnasium; Princeton, New Jersey |
NCAA tournament
| Mar 15, 1991* | (8 E) No. 18 | vs. (9 E) Villanova | L 48–50 | 24–3 | Carrier Dome; Syracuse, New York |
*Non-conference game. ^{#}Rankings from AP Poll. (#) Tournament seedings in parentheses. E=East.

== Rankings ==
Ranking movement Legend: ██ Increase in ranking. ██ Decrease in ranking.
| Poll | Pre | Wk 1 | Wk 2 | Wk 3 | Wk 4 | Wk 5 | Wk 6 | Wk 7 | Wk 8 | Wk 9 | Wk 10 | Wk 11 | Wk 12 | Wk 13 | Wk 14 | Wk 15 | Final |
|---|---|---|---|---|---|---|---|---|---|---|---|---|---|---|---|---|---|
| AP Poll | – | – | – | – | 25 | – | – | – | – | – | – | – | 25 | 23 | 21 | 19 | 18 |

== NCAA tournament ==
The team was seeded eighth in the 1991 NCAA Division I men's basketball tournament.

NCAA Tournament

3/15/91 in Syracuse, N.Y.: (9) Villanova 50, (8) Princeton 48

== Awards and honors ==
- Kit Mueller
  - Ivy League Men's Basketball Player of the Year
  - First Team All-Ivy League
  - Academic All-America
- Sean Jackson
  - First Team All-Ivy League
- Chris Marquardt
  - Honorable Mention All-Ivy League
