= Kit Mueller =

American basketball player

Personal information
- Listed height: 6 ft 7 in (2.01 m)

Career information
- High school: Downers Grove South (Downers Grove, Illinois)
- College: Princeton (1987–1991)
- NBA draft: 1991: undrafted
- Playing career: 1991–?
- Position: Center

Career highlights
- 3× First-team All-Ivy League (1989, 1990, 1991); 2× Ivy League Player of the Year (1990, 1991); 2× Academic All-America (1990, 1991)

Christopher J. "Kit" Mueller (born c. 1969) is a retired American basketball player. He played high school basketball in the Chicago metropolitan area for Downers Grove South High School. Subsequently, he starred for the Princeton Tigers men's basketball team, where he was a two-time Ivy League Men's Basketball Player of the Year (1990 and 1991) and three-time first team All-Ivy League player (1989, 1990 and 1991) as a center. He was also a two-time Academic All-America selection. As an All-Ivy League performer, he led his team to three consecutive Ivy League Championships and NCAA Division I men's basketball tournaments.

He matriculated to Princeton University, after an injury late in his senior year caused other Division I schools to withdraw their offers. As of 2011, he continues to rank second and fourth in school history in career assists (381) and points (1,546), respectively. He led the team in rebounds all four seasons and in points, assists and blocked shots three times each. He led the Ivy League in field goal percentage three times and ranks third all-time in Princeton history in that statistic for his career.

The team earned three consecutive Ivy League championships during his career, including an undefeated conference record during his senior season. Despite the team's success and his individual accolades, his Princeton tenure was punctuated by three NCAA tournament first-round losses by a total of seven points, most notably the March 17, 1989 NCAA Division I men's basketball tournament first-round 50–49 Georgetown vs. Princeton men's basketball game loss to the number-one seeded Georgetown Hoyas team featuring Alonzo Mourning and Dikembe Mutombo as well as 1989 Big East Conference Men's Basketball Player of the Year Charles Smith.

After his collegiate career ended, Mueller played professional basketball in Switzerland. Then he returned to Chicago, where he became a hedge-fund trader. In Chicago, he has played amateur 3-on-3 basketball with other Ivy League athletes at national competitions.

== High school ==
Mueller attended Downers Grove South High School. As a freshman, he led the sophomore team with 18 points per game. He came off the bench for the varsity team as a sophomore to average 10 points per game as a 6-foot-3-inch (1.91 m) 185-pound (84 kg) forward. He grew 2 inches (5.1 cm) and 20 pounds (9.1 kg) prior to his junior season and became a center. As a junior, his outside shot was still undeveloped, but he averaged 20 points and 10 rebounds, leading his team to the 1986 Des Plaines Valley League championship and a second straight trip to the sectional finals. The team was ranked in the Chicago Sun-Times Super 25 for a couple of weeks during the season. He was benched for one game in early March of his junior year for disciplinary reasons by coach Dick Flaiz. The Chicago Sun-Times named him the MVP of the league. Mueller also played varsity tennis as a junior. Following the school year, he played in the suburban summer basketball league at Triton College in River Grove, Illinois.

As a senior, he was his team's only returning varsity letterman, and was ranked by the Chicago Sun-Times among the preseason top 50 Metro Chicago basketball players. Off The Glass, a national basketball magazine, ranked him among the 19 best basketball players in the state of Illinois, along with Walter Bond, Marcus Liberty, Brian Banks and Rodell Davis. At the beginning of December of his senior season, the team was ranked 23rd in the Chicago Sun-Times' Metro Chicago top 25, and there was talk of the team improving on the 23–6 record of the prior year. He led the West Suburban Conference in scoring and rebounding most of the season and was an All-Conference selection. Mueller posted his career-high 45 points on March 3, 1987 in an 83–47 victory against Montini High School. By the end of his senior season, he was one of the 20 All-Chicago Area selections by the Chicago Sun-Times, in a class that included Eric Anderson, Bond, Liberty and Sam Mack, after averaging 23 points and 14 rebounds. However, unlike Anderson, Liberty and Bond, he was not one of the nine area All-State nominees.

Mueller, who scored 1290 out of 1600 on his SAT and a 31 on his ACT, was a highly recruited high-school basketball player. However, by early March 1987, he had not signed a National Letter of Intent as a commitment to any school. At that time, he was keeping a pair of piranhas at home in an aquarium and accidentally injured his left foot by breaking the aquarium's glass. The resulting injury caused severe damage to his leg including a severed achilles tendon; he had surgery to repair the damage in late March. Division I schools like Northwestern University withdrew their scholarship offers; however, Princeton maintained an interest, with supporters like John Rogers behind him. As most of his scholarship offers were withdrawn, he began to focus on schools that could provide him an academic opportunity in the event that his basketball career was over. He eventually matriculated at Princeton, unsure of whether he would ever play competitive basketball again.

== College ==
As a freshman, Mueller helped the 1987–88 Tigers win their final three games in March to finish the season with a 17–9 (9–5 Ivy League) record. He posted 25 points in the March 1, 1988 67–65 victory against Penn. Two games later, in the final game of the season on March 5, he added 22 points in 79–58 victory over league champion Cornell. He finished the season as the Ivy League statistical champion in field-goal percentage for the first of three times. He led the team in rebounds and blocked shots.

Mueller began his career wearing the number 55, but switched to 00 by his sophomore year. During his sophomore season, the 1988–89 team earned a #1 vs. #16 matchup in the first round of the 1989 NCAA Division I men's basketball tournament with their Pete Carril-coached princeton offense. The New York Times reported that the matchup seemed comical to some, even though Carill had a system that frustrated many offensive systems and had already produced upsets. In the St. Patrick's Day 1989 Georgetown vs. Princeton men's basketball game, the 16th-seeded Tigers were 23-point underdogs according to the Las Vegas bookmakers, and Dick Vitale had promised to serve as a Tiger ballboy if they won. Entering the game, the last four Ivy League representatives in the tournament had lost in the first round by an average of 35 points. During the game, Mueller's defensive assignment was Mourning, and he contributed nine points and eight assists to Princeton's 49-point effort. During the game, Mueller played beyond the foul line on the offensive end, forcing Mourning to leave passing lanes open for back-door attacks. Although the strategy enabled Princeton to stay in the game, Mourning had seven blocked shots, including two in the final fifteen seconds. Mueller's final shot was deflected by Mourning, which is remembered by Princeton fans as an uncalled foul. The team finished with a 19–8 (11–3) record. Later in the same tournament, Duke would use Christian Laettner at the top of the key, like Princeton had used Mueller, and eliminate Georgetown by shutting down Mourning. The Princeton-Georgetown game is regarded as one of only a handful of close #1 vs. #16 matchups in NCAA tournament history. For the season, he repeated as Ivy League field goal percentage champion. He was a first-team All-Ivy honoree. He led the team in points, rebounds, assists and blocked shots.

As a junior, Mueller led the 1989–90 Tigers to a repeat Ivy League championship as the Ivy League Player of the Year. The team earned a 13 seed for the 1990 NCAA tournament. The team finished with a 20–7 (11–3) record after losing to the Arkansas Razorbacks by a 68–64 margin. Mueller was one of only six Tigers to appear in the game and led the team with 19 points. As a junior, Mueller earned a third team Academic All-America recognition from College Sports Information Directors of America. He was a first-team All-Ivy performer as well as Ivy League Player of the Year. He led the team in points, rebounds, and assists.

In a February 23, 1991, game against Cornell, Mueller earned his current position as Princeton's second all-time leading scorer one night after the 1990–91 Princeton Tigers men's basketball team had clinched its third consecutive Ivy League championship with a victory over Columbia. The team went undefeated in the Ivy League and earned a berth in the 1991 NCAA Division I men's basketball tournament. After its strong tournament performances in the prior two seasons and strong regular season, the team earned a number 8 seed, which was a record for the highest seed by an Ivy League school at the time. The team had another close but disappointing loss, this time by a 50–48 margin to Villanova, finishing with a 24–3 (14–0) record. That year, senior Mueller served as team captain, and earned first team Academic All-America honors. That season marked the third year that Mueller led the team in points, assists and blocked shots and the fourth time that he led the team in rebounds. For the season, he earned his third Ivy League field-goal percentage championship. He repeated as Ivy League Player of the Year and was a first-team All-Ivy performer for the third consecutive season.

He remains prominent in the Princeton basketball record books. When Mueller ended his career, his 1,546 career points trailed only Bill Bradley and his 381 career assists were also second in school history. His single-season assist totals of 140 in 1989-90 and 128 in 1990-91 remain second and fourth in school history. Only one other Tiger has totaled 11 assists in a game (a feat Mueller achieved three times). His career 59.5 field goal percentage is third in school history, as is his sophomore single-season rate of 64.9%. A 2009 publication by ESPN ranked him among the five greatest basketball players in Princeton history. On March 19, 2012, Doug Davis surpassed Mueller for second place on the Princeton scoring list. On March 1, 2013, Ian Hummer passed him as well.

== Post graduate ==
After graduation, Mueller played professional basketball in Switzerland. He then became a professional hedge-fund trader, and has played in competitive 3-on-3 basketball leagues with various combinations of Ivy League athletes including Arne Duncan, Craig Robinson, Mitch Henderson and Rogers in the mid-to-late 1990s and early 2000s. The mid-1990s versions of the team were Chicago-area champions. In 1998, he won a 3-on-3 tournament in Dallas with Rogers and Robinson. Both the 2001 and 2003 versions of the team, named "Slow and Steady", qualified for national competition. The 2003 team with Duncan, Robinson, Henderson and Brian Earl made the national championship. Mueller's daughter, Ellie, followed in her father's footsteps and now plays lacrosse for the Tigers.
