= 1989–90 Princeton Tigers men's basketball team =

American college basketball season

1989–90 Princeton Tigers men's basketball

Ivy League Champion

1990 NCAA Division I men's basketball tournament, Thirteen seed, First round
- Conference: Ivy League
- Record: 20–7 (11–3, 1st Ivy)
- Head coach: Pete Carril (23rd season)
- Captain: Matt Lapin
- Home arena: Jadwin Gymnasium

1989–90 Ivy League men's basketball standings
	Conf.				Overall
Team	W		L	PCT	W		L	PCT
Princeton	11	–	3	.786	20	–	7	.741
Yale	10	–	4	.714	19	–	7	.731
Dartmouth	7	–	7	.500	12	–	14	.462
Harvard	7	–	7	.500	12	–	14	.462
Penn	7	–	7	.500	12	–	14	.462
Brown	7	–	7	.500	10	–	16	.385
Cornell	5	–	9	.357	12	–	17	.414
Columbia	2	–	12	.143	4	–	22	.154
Rankings from AP Poll

The 1989–90 Princeton Tigers men's basketball team represented Princeton University in intercollegiate college basketball during the 1989–90 NCAA Division I men's basketball season. The head coach was Pete Carril and the team captains was Matt Lapin. The team played its home games in the Jadwin Gymnasium on the University campus in Princeton, New Jersey. The team was the champion of the Ivy League, which earned them an invitation to the 64-team 1990 NCAA Division I men's basketball tournament where they were seeded thirteenth in the Midwest Region.

The team posted a 20–7 overall record and an 11–3 conference record. In a March 15, 1990 NCAA Division I men's basketball tournament Midwest Regional first round game at the Erwin Events Center in Austin, Texas against the Arkansas Razorbacks, they lost by a 68–64 margin. Kit Mueller cut the lead to two points with 14 seconds remaining, but Arkansas made its free throws to close out the game. When the team beat Dartmouth 66–28 on February 10, 1990, it established a new National Collegiate Athletic Association Division I record for fewest points allowed (since 1986) while running the Princeton offense. The team would break its own record the following year.

The team was led by first team All-Ivy League selection Mueller, who earned the Ivy League Men's Basketball Player of the Year award as well as third team Academic All-America recognition from College Sports Information Directors of America. Lapin led the nation in three-point field goal shooting percentage (53.4%, 71 of 133), and the team led the nation in both three point shooting percentage (45.2) and scoring defense with a 51.0 average. Lapin also led the Ivy League in three point shooting percentage in conference games with a 57.7% average. The scoring defense statistical championship was the second of twelve consecutive titles.

== Schedule and results ==
The team posted a 20–7 (11–3 Ivy League) record.

Date time, TV	Rank^{#}	Opponent^{#}	Result	Record	Site city, state
Regular season
Nov 25, 1989*		Franklin & Marshall	W 64–47	1–0	Jadwin Gymnasium; Princeton, New Jersey
Nov 28, 1989*		Lehigh	W 61–50	2–0	Jadwin Gymnasium; Princeton, New Jersey
Dec 2, 1989*		at Dayton	L 62–68	2–1	UD Arena; Dayton, Ohio
Dec 6, 1989*		at Iona	W 53–41	3–1	John A. Mulcahy Campus Events Center; New Rochelle, New York
Dec 9, 1989*		at Saint Joseph's	W 62–47	4–1	Alumni Memorial Fieldhouse; Philadelphia, Pennsylvania
Dec 16, 1989*		Rutgers	W 65–60	5–1	Jadwin Gymnasium; Princeton, New Jersey
Dec 22, 1989*		vs. Xavier; MetLife Classic	L 65–72	5–2	War Memorial Gymnasium; San Francisco, California
Dec 23, 1989*		vs. Canisius; MetLife Classic	W 73–59	6–2	War Memorial Gymnasium; San Francisco, California
Dec 29, 1989*		vs. Arkansas–Little Rock; Spartan Classic	W 59–56	7–2	Breslin Student Events Center; East Lansing, Michigan
Dec 30, 1989*		at Michigan State; Spartan Classic	L 49–51	7–3	Breslin Student Events Center; East Lansing, Michigan
Jan 3, 1990*		Delaware	W 58–41	8–3	Jadwin Gymnasium; Princeton, New Jersey
Jan 6, 1990		Penn	W 56–44	9–3 (1–0)	Jadwin Gymnasium; Princeton, New Jersey
Jan 12, 1990		at Yale	L 37–39	9–4 (1–1)	John J. Lee Amphitheater; New Haven, Connecticut
Jan 13, 1990		at Brown	W 64–53	10–4 (2–1)	Pizzitola Sports Center; Providence, Rhode Island
Jan 6, 1990*		Susquehanna	W 75–38	11–4	Jadwin Gymnasium; Princeton, New Jersey
Feb 2, 1990		at Columbia	W 67–39	12–4 (3–1)	Levien Gymnasium; New York, New York
Feb 3, 1990		at Cornell	W 60–54	13–4 (4–1)	Newman Arena; Ithaca, New York
Feb 6, 1990		at Penn	L 50–51	13–5 (4–2)	The Palestra; Philadelphia, Pennsylvania
Feb 9, 1990		Harvard	W 86–73	14–5 (5–2)	Jadwin Gymnasium; Princeton, New Jersey
Feb 10, 1990		Dartmouth	W 66–28	15–5 (6–2)	Jadwin Gymnasium; Princeton, New Jersey
Feb 16, 1990		Brown	W 74–47	16–5 (7–2)	Jadwin Gymnasium; Princeton, New Jersey
Feb 17, 1990		Yale	W 62–47	17–5 (8–2)	Jadwin Gymnasium; Princeton, New Jersey
Feb 23, 1990		at Dartmouth	W 58–49	18–5 (9–2)	Leede Arena; Hanover, New Hampshire
Feb 24, 1990		at Harvard	L 63–69	18–6 (9–3)	Lavietes Pavilion; Cambridge, Massachusetts
Mar 2, 1990		Cornell	W 64–41	19–6 (10–3)	Jadwin Gymnasium; Princeton, New Jersey
Mar 3, 1990		Columbia	W 73–46	20–6 (11–3)	Jadwin Gymnasium; Princeton, New Jersey
NCAA tournament
Mar 15, 1990*	(13 MW)	vs. (4 MW) No. 7 Arkansas; First round	L 64–68	20–7	Frank Erwin Center; Austin, Texas
*Non-conference game. ^{#}Rankings from AP Poll. (#) Tournament seedings in parentheses. MW=Midwest.
