= Bob Scrabis =

Bob Scrabis may refer to:

- Bob Scrabis (American football)
- Bob Scrabis (basketball)
