= Sean Jackson =

Sean Jackson may refer to:

- Sean Jackson (Scottish musician)
- Sean C. Jackson, maze artist
- Sean Jackson (basketball), American basketball player
- Sean Jackson, an American football player in the 1993 Orange Bowl
- Sean Jackson, an actor in the audio drama The Healers

== See also ==
- DeSean Jackson (born 1986), American football player
- Shaun Jackson, a character in the British television series Holby City
