= 1991–92 Princeton Tigers men's basketball team =

American college basketball season

1991–92 Princeton Tigers men's basketball

Ivy League Champion

1992 NCAA Men's Division I Tournament, Eleven Seed, Round of 64
- Conference: Ivy League
- Record: 22–6 (12–2, 1st Ivy)
- Head coach: Pete Carril (25th season)
- Captains: Matt Eastwick; Sean Jackson; George Leftwich
- Home arena: Jadwin Gymnasium

1991–92 Ivy League men's basketball standings
	Conf.				Overall
Team	W		L	PCT	W		L	PCT
Princeton	12	–	2	.857	22	–	6	.786
Penn	9	–	5	.643	16	–	10	.615
Columbia	8	–	6	.571	10	–	16	.385
Yale	7	–	7	.500	17	–	9	.654
Brown	5	–	9	.357	11	–	15	.423
Dartmouth	5	–	9	.357	10	–	16	.385
Cornell	5	–	9	.357	7	–	19	.269
Harvard	5	–	9	.357	6	–	20	.231
Rankings from AP Poll

The 1991–92 Princeton Tigers men's basketball team represented Princeton University in intercollegiate college basketball during the 1991–92 NCAA Division I men's basketball season. The head coach was Pete Carril and the team co-captains were Matt Eastwick, Sean Jackson and George Leftwich. The team played its home games in the Jadwin Gymnasium on the university campus in Princeton, New Jersey. The team was the champion of the Ivy League, which earned them an invitation to the 64-team 1992 NCAA Division I men's basketball tournament where they were seeded eleventh in the East Region. This was the team's fourth consecutive appearance in the NCAA basketball tournament after having lost in the first round by a total of seven points in the prior three years. The season included a 15-game winning streak that supported a 26-game Ivy League winning streak (4 shy of the conference record) both of which ended on February 28, 1992, against Yale.

Using the Princeton offense, the team posted a 22–6 overall record, which included a fifteen-game winning streak, and a 12–2 conference record. In a March 19, 1992 NCAA Division I men's basketball tournament East Regional first-round game at the Centrum Centre in Worcester, Massachusetts against the Syracuse Orange, they lost by a 51–43 margin. A streak of fourteen consecutive Syracuse points by Lawrence Moten sealed Princeton's fate in the second half. The team claims to have been the only team in the tournament that did not have any players that averaged at least 12 points per game.

The team was led by first team All-Ivy League selections Sean Jackson, who gave Princeton its fourth consecutive Ivy League Men's Basketball Player of the Year awardee. Rick Hielscher earned Ivy League Men's Basketball Rookie of the Year honors. The team won the fourth of twelve consecutive national statistical championships in scoring defense with a 48.9 points allowed average.

== Schedule and results ==
The team posted a 22–6 (12–2 Ivy League) record.

Date time, TV	Rank^{#}	Opponent^{#}	Result	Record	Site city, state
Regular season
Nov 20, 1991*		Monmouth; Preseason NIT	W 58–47	1–0	Jadwin Gymnasium; Princeton, New Jersey
Nov 21, 1991*		at Texas; Preseason NIT	L 46–57	1–1	Frank Erwin Center; Austin, Texas
Nov 30, 1991*		Lafayette	W 72–49	2–1	Jadwin Gymnasium; Princeton, New Jersey
Dec 3, 1991*		Rutgers	L 41–46	2–2	Jadwin Gymnasium; Princeton, New Jersey
Dec 6, 1991*		vs. Hofstra; Dr. Pepper Invitational	W 54–42	3–2	Ferrell Center; Waco, Texas
Dec 7, 1991*		at Baylor; Dr. Pepper Invitational	W 61–54	4–2	Ferrell Center; Waco, Texas
Dec 13, 1991		vs. Oral Roberts; Cougar Classic	W 64–55	5–2 (1–0)	Marriott Center; Provo, Utah
Dec 14, 1991*		at BYU; Cougar Classic	L 59–65	5–3	Marriott Center; Provo, Utah
Dec 18, 1991*		at NC State	W 50–47	6–3	Reynolds Coliseum; Raleigh, North Carolina
Dec 21, 1991*		at La Salle	W 47–46	7–3	Convention Hall; Philadelphia, Pennsylvania
Jan 4, 1992*		at Loyola (MD)	W 47–46	8–3	Reitz Arena; Baltimore, Maryland
Jan 8, 1992*		Iona	W 68–51	9–3	Jadwin Gymnasium; Princeton, New Jersey
Jan 11, 1992		Penn	W 55–42	10–3 (1–0)	Jadwin Gymnasium; Princeton, New Jersey
Jan 27, 1992*		Franklin & Marshall	W 80–45	11–3	Jadwin Gymnasium; Princeton, New Jersey
Jan 31, 1992		at Harvard	W 67–44	12–3 (2–0)	Lavietes Pavilion; Cambridge, Massachusetts
Feb 1, 1992		at Dartmouth	W 83–44	13–3 (3–0)	Leede Arena; Hanover, New Hampshire
Feb 4, 1992		at Penn	W 42–40	14–3 (4–0)	The Palestra; Philadelphia, Pennsylvania
Feb 7, 1992		Columbia	W 71–55	15–3 (5–0)	Jadwin Gymnasium; Princeton, New Jersey
Feb 8, 1992		Cornell	W 48–31	16–3 (6–0)	Jadwin Gymnasium; Princeton, New Jersey
Feb 14, 1992		at Brown	W 79–54	17–3 (7–0)	Pizzitola Sports Center; Providence, Rhode Island
Feb 15, 1992		at Yale	W 46–35	18–3 (8–0)	John J. Lee Amphitheater; New Haven, Connecticut
Feb 21, 1992		Dartmouth	W 48–36	19–3 (9–0)	Jadwin Gymnasium; Princeton, New Jersey
Feb 22, 1992		Harvard	W 87–50	20–3 (10–0)	Jadwin Gymnasium; Princeton, New Jersey
Feb 28, 1992		Yale	L 46–47	20–4 (10–1)	Jadwin Gymnasium; Princeton, New Jersey
Feb 29, 1992		Brown	W 58–49	21–4 (11–1)	Jadwin Gymnasium; Princeton, New Jersey
Mar 6, 1992		at Cornell	L 66–70	21–5 (11–2)	Newman Arena; Ithaca, New York
Mar 7, 1992		at Columbia	W 65–51	22–5 (12–2)	Levien Gymnasium; New York, New York
NCAA tournament
Mar 20, 1992*	(11 E)	vs. (6 E) No. 21 Syracuse; First round	L 43–51	22–6	Centrum in Worcester; Worcester, Massachusetts
*Non-conference game. ^{#}Rankings from AP Poll. (#) Tournament seedings in parentheses. E=East.
