= 1988–89 Princeton Tigers men's basketball team =

American college basketball season

1988–89 Princeton Tigers men's basketball

Ivy League Champion

NCAA tournament, First Round
- Conference: Ivy League
- Record: 19–8 (11–3, 1st Ivy)
- Head coach: Pete Carril (22nd season)
- Captain: Bob Scrabis
- Home arena: Jadwin Gymnasium

1988–89 Ivy League men's basketball standings
| | Conf. | | | | Overall |
| Team | W | | L | PCT | W | | L | PCT |
|---|---|---|---|---|---|---|---|---|
| Princeton | 11 | – | 3 | .786 | 19 | – | 8 | .704 |
| Dartmouth | 10 | – | 4 | .714 | 17 | – | 9 | .654 |
| Penn | 9 | – | 5 | .643 | 13 | – | 13 | .500 |
| Harvard | 7 | – | 7 | .500 | 11 | – | 15 | .423 |
| Cornell | 7 | – | 7 | .500 | 10 | – | 16 | .385 |
| Yale | 6 | – | 8 | .429 | 11 | – | 17 | .393 |
| Columbia | 4 | – | 10 | .286 | 8 | – | 18 | .308 |
| Brown | 2 | – | 12 | .143 | 7 | – | 19 | .269 |
Rankings from AP Poll

The 1988–89 Princeton Tigers men's basketball team represented Princeton University in intercollegiate college basketball during the 1988–89 NCAA Division I men's basketball season. The head coach was Pete Carril and the team captains was Bob Scrabis. The team played its home games in the Jadwin Gymnasium on the university campus in Princeton, New Jersey. The team was the champion of the Ivy League, which earned them an invitation to the 64-team 1989 NCAA Division I men's basketball tournament where they were seeded sixteenth in the East Region.

The team posted a 19–8 overall record and an 11–3 conference record. When the team defeated Colgate 43–33 on November 30, 1988, it established a new National Collegiate Athletic Association Division I record for fewest combined points (since 1986), using the Princeton offense. The record would stand until December 16, 1989. In an East regional first-round game of the 1989 NCAA Division I men's basketball tournament against the Georgetown Hoyas, they lost by a 50–49 margin. The game matched the unheralded sixteenth-seeded Princeton Tigers against the number one seeded Hoyas who featured freshman Alonzo Mourning and senior guard Charles Smith. Mourning blocked shots by Scrabis and Kit Mueller in the final six seconds to save the one-point victory for the Hoyas.

The team was led by first team All-Ivy League selections Scrabis and Mueller. Scrabis earned the Ivy League Men's Basketball Player of the Year award. Mueller shot 70.9% on his field goals to earn the second of three Ivy League statistical championships for field goal percentage. The team won the first of twelve consecutive national statistical championships in scoring defense with a 53.0 points allowed average.

== Schedule and results ==
| Date time, TV | Rank^{#} | Opponent^{#} | Result | Record | Site city, state |
Non-conference regular season
| Nov, 1988* | | Franklin & Marshall College | W 68–60 | 1–0 | Jadwin Gymnasium; Princeton, NJ |
| Nov 30, 1988* | | Colgate | W 43–33 | 2–0 | Jadwin Gymnasium; Princeton, NJ |
| Dec 3, 1988* | | Iona | W 49–46 | 3–0 | Jadwin Gymnasium; Princeton, NJ |
| Dec 7, 1988* | | at Lehigh | W 54–47 | 4–0 | Stabler Arena; Bethlehem, PA |
| Dec 10, 1988* | | Saint Joseph's | W 59–53 | 5–0 | Jadwin Gymnasium; Princeton, NJ |
| Dec 17, 1988* | | at Rutgers | L 63–69 | 5–1 | Louis Brown Athletic Center; Piscataway, NJ |
| Dec 22, 1988* | | at No. 15 Seton Hall | L 46–64 | 5–2 | Izod Center; East Rutherford, NJ |
| Dec 29, 1988* | | vs. Georgia; Cotton States Classic | L 54–58 | 5–3 | Omni Coliseum; Atlanta, GA |
| Dec 30, 1988* | | vs. No. 16 South Carolina; Cotton States Classic | W 69–58 | 6–3 | Omni Coliseum; Atlanta, GA |
| Jan 4, 1989* | | at Delaware | L 45–52 | 6–4 | Delaware Field House; Newark, DE |
| Jan 7, 1989* | | Fordham | W 57–53 | 7–4 | Jadwin Gymnasium; Princeton, NJ |
| Jan 23, 1989* | | Muhlenberg | W 49–46 | 8–4 | Jadwin Gymnasium; Princeton, NJ |
Ivy League
| Jan 27, 1989* | | at Brown | W 61–55 | 9–4 (1–0) | Marvel Gymnasium; Providence, RI |
| Jan 28, 1989* | | at Yale | W 51–48 | 10–4 (2–0) | John J. Lee Amphitheater; New Haven, CT |
| Feb 3, 1989* | | Harvard | L 57–63 | 10–5 (2–1) | Jadwin Gymnasium; Princeton, NJ |
| Feb 4, 1989* | | Dartmouth | W 63–53 | 11–5 (3–1) | Jadwin Gymnasium; Princeton, NJ |
| Feb 7, 1989* | | Penn | W 53–43 | 12–5 (4–1) | Jadwin Gymnasium; Princeton, NJ |
| Feb 10, 1989* | | at Columbia | W 72–54 | 13–5 (5–1) | Levien Gymnasium; New York, NY |
| Feb 11, 1989* | | at Cornell | W 60–49 | 14–5 (6–1) | Barton Hall; Ithaca, NY |
| Feb 17, 1989* | | Yale | W 70–60 | 15–5 (7–1) | Jadwin Gymnasium; Princeton, NJ |
| Feb 18, 1989* | | Brown | W 57–33 | 16–5 (8–1) | Jadwin Gymnasium; Princeton, NJ |
| Feb 24, 1989* | | Cornell | W 65–46 | 17–5 (9–1) | Jadwin Gymnasium; Princeton, NJ |
| Feb 25, 1989* | | Columbia | W 78–62 | 18–5 (10–1) | Jadwin Gymnasium; Princeton, NJ |
| Feb 28, 1989* | | at Penn | L 42–43 | 18–6 (10–2) | Palestra; Philadelphia, PA |
| Mar 3, 1989* | | at Dartmouth | L 43–53 | 18–7 (10–3) | Leede Arena; Hanover, NH |
| Mar 4, 1989* | | at Harvard | W 73–64 | 19–7 (11–3) | Lavietes Pavilion; Boston, MA |
NCAA tournament
| Mar 17, 1989* | (16 E) | vs. (1 E) No. 2 Georgetown; First Round | L 49–50 | 19–8 | Providence Civic Center; Providence, RI |
*Non-conference game. ^{#}Rankings from AP Poll. (#) Tournament seedings in parentheses. E=East. All times are in Eastern Time.
