= Mike Kearns =

American basketball player (1929–2009)

Personal information
- Born: June 18, 1929 Trenton, New Jersey, U.S.
- Died: January 31, 2009 (aged 79) Hamilton, New Jersey, U.S.
- Listed height: 6 ft 2 in (1.88 m)
- Listed weight: 178 lb (81 kg)

Career information
- High school: Trenton Central (Trenton, New Jersey)
- College: Princeton (1948–1951)
- NBA draft: 1951: 5th round, 48th overall pick
- Drafted by: Philadelphia Warriors
- Position: Point guard
- Number: 7

Career history
- 1955: Philadelphia Warriors
- 1955–1956: Trenton Capitols
- Stats at NBA.com
- Stats at Basketball Reference

Michael Joseph Kearns Sr. (June 18, 1929 – January 31, 2009) was an American basketball player. He played college basketball for Princeton before playing professionally in the National Basketball Association and the Eastern Professional Basketball League.

== Biography ==
Born and raised in Trenton, New Jersey, Kearns played high school basketball at Trenton Central High School.

Kearns played college basketball for Princeton. He was a three-year starter and the teams captain during his senior season.

Following his college career, Kearns was selected in the 1951 NBA draft by the Philadelphia Warriors. He joined the Warriors in 1955, after serving in the U.S. Army, appearing in six games during the second half of the 1954–55. He was released by the Warriors in October 1955. He later played for the Trenton Capitols in the Eastern Professional Basketball League.

== Career statistics ==
Legend
GP	Games played	GS	Games started	MPG	Minutes per game
FG%	Field goal percentage	3P%	3-point field goal percentage	FT%	Free throw percentage
RPG	Rebounds per game	APG	Assists per game	SPG	Steals per game
BPG	Blocks per game	PPG	Points per game	**Bold**	Career high

=== NBA ===
==== Regular season ====
Year	Team	GP	MPG	FG%	FT%	RPG	APG	PPG
1954–55	Philadelphia	6	4.2	.000	.250	.5	.8	.2
