= Brian Earl =

American basketball player and coach (born 1976)

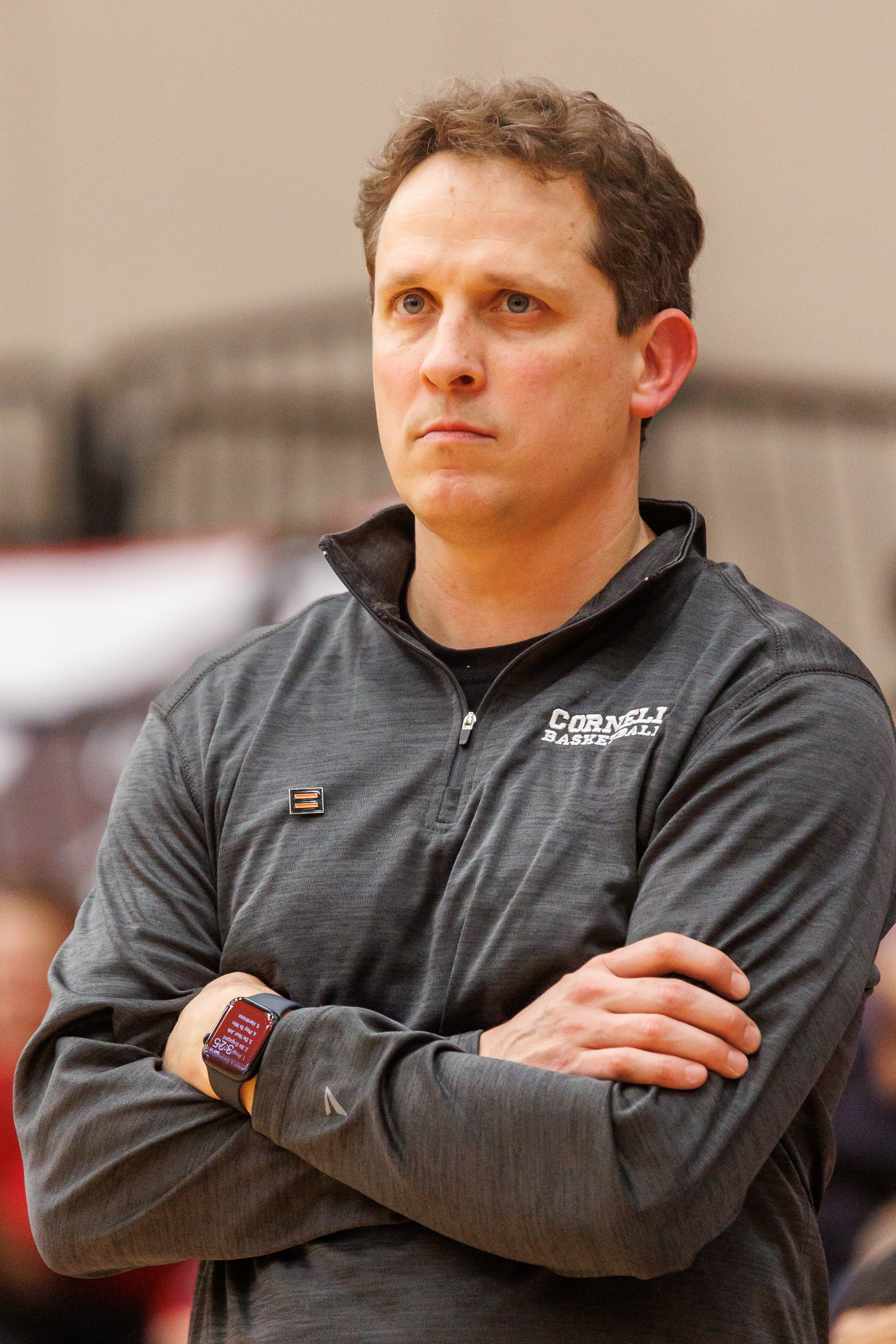

Current position
- Title: Head coach
- Team: William & Mary
- Conference: CAA
- Record: 41–29 (.586)

Biographical details
- Born: August 9, 1976 (age 50)

Playing career
- 1995–1999: Princeton

Coaching career (HC unless noted)
- 2007–2016: Princeton (assistant)
- 2016–2024: Cornell
- 2024–present: William & Mary

Head coaching record
- Overall: 137–132 (.509)
- Tournaments: 0–1 (NIT); 0–1 (CIT)

Accomplishments and honors

Awards
- As player: Ivy League Player of the Year (1999); First-team All-Ivy League (1999); Second-team All-Ivy League (1998); As coach: Ivy League Coach of the Year (2022)

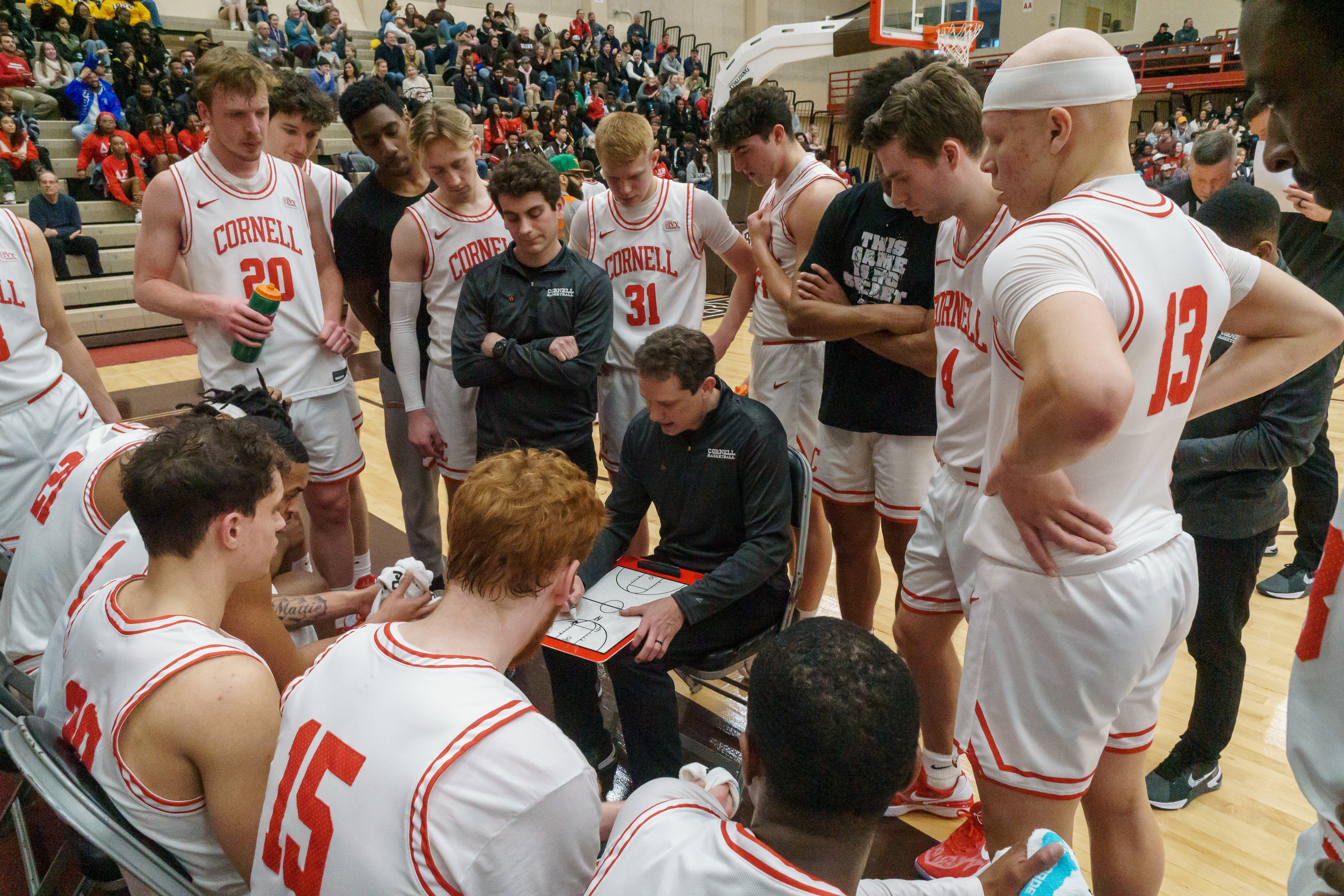
Coach Earl (seated, center) confers with Cornell players in 2023

Brian W. Earl (born August 9, 1976) is an American basketball coach and former professional basketball player. He is the current head coach for the William & Mary team. Prior to his start at William & Mary, Earl was the head coach for the Cornell Big Red men's basketball team. He previously served nine seasons as an assistant coach for Princeton Tigers men's basketball where he had formerly been team captain and earned three Ivy League championships. He is the brother of coach and former player Dan Earl.

== High school ==
Earl grew up in Medford Lakes, New Jersey and attended Shawnee High School in Medford where he was the 1995 The Philadelphia Inquirer player of the year. He is the younger brother of former All-Big Ten player Dan Earl. Dan became VMI head coach the year before Brian became a head coach. Shawnee never lost a home game during Earl's first three seasons as a starter. Earl was two classes behind his brother at Shawnee and had hoped to join him at Penn State, but Penn State did not recruit him. Most major programs lost interest in Earl when his play was limited by injury as a junior. His only offers were from Princeton and Penn.

== College ==
He earned Ivy League championships with the 1995–96, 1996–97 and 1997–98 Princeton Tigers. Earl served as captain of the 1998–99 Princeton Tigers men's basketball team. He was second team all-Ivy for the 1997–98 Tigers and Ivy League Men's Basketball Player of the Year as a senior the following year. His career totals of 113 games started and 281 three-point field goals are Princeton records and stood as Ivy League records until Ryan Wittman totalled 119 and 377 for Cornell in 2010.

== Professional career ==
Following his Princeton career, Earl was selected in the second round of the 1999 United States Basketball League Draft by the Atlantic City Seagulls. He then played professionally in Germany and England as well as in the Eastern Basketball Alliance. In 2003, he teamed with Kit Mueller, Arne Duncan, Craig Robinson and Mitch Henderson to make the national 3-on-3 championship game. He served as an assistant coach at for Princeton under former teammates Mitch Henderson and Sydney Johnson from 2007 through 2016. In each of Earl's first four seasons as an assistant, Princeton improved its win total. Earl, who worked mostly with the defense as an assistant, replaced Bill Courtney as head coach for Cornell in 2016 after the school endured six consecutive losing seasons. On March 23, 2024, Earl was named as the new head coach for William & Mary.

== Head coaching record ==
Record table
| Season | Team | Overall | Conference | Standing | Postseason |
|---|---|---|---|---|---|
Cornell Big Red (Ivy League) (2016–2024)
| 2016–17 | Cornell | 8–21 | 4–10 | T–6th | |
| 2017–18 | Cornell | 12–16 | 6–8 | 4th | |
| 2018–19 | Cornell | 15–16 | 7–7 | T–4th | CIT First Round |
| 2019–20 | Cornell | 7–20 | 4–10 | 7th | |
| 2021–22 | Cornell | 15–11 | 7–7 | 4th | |
| 2022–23 | Cornell | 17–11 | 7–7 | T–4th | |
| 2023–24 | Cornell | 22–8 | 11–3 | T–2nd | NIT First Round |
| Cornell: | | 96–103 (.482) | 46–52 (.469) | | |
William & Mary Tribe (Coastal Athletic Association) (2024–present)
| 2024–25 | William & Mary | 17–15 | 11–7 | 4th | |
| 2025–26 | William & Mary | 20–12 | 10–8 | T–5th | |
| 2026–27 | William & Mary | 4–2 | 0–0 | | |
| William & Mary: | | 41–29 (.586) | 21–15 (.583) | | |
| Total: | | 137–132 (.509) | | | |
