= 1989 Georgetown vs. Princeton men's basketball game =

Near-upset by a 16-seed in the 1989 NCAA tournament

1989 NCAA tournament east regional first round
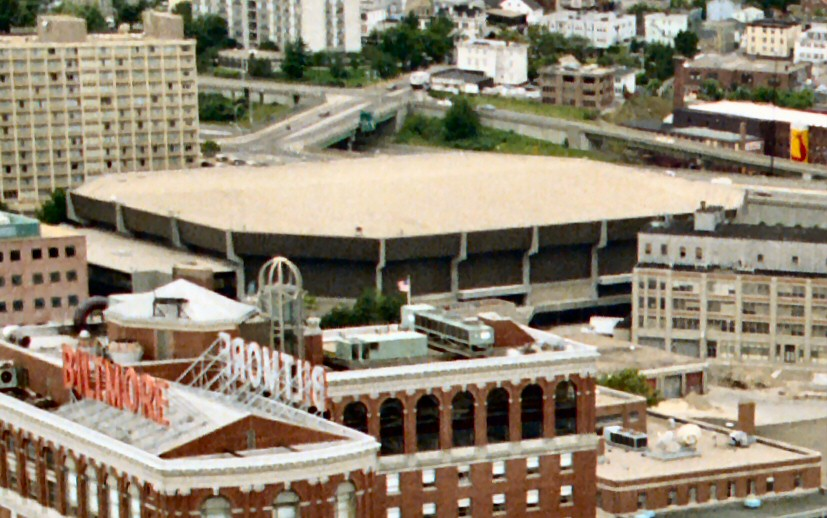
- The Providence Civic Center in 1990
Princeton Tigers	Georgetown Hoyas
(17–7)	(22–4)
49	50
Head coach: Pete Carril	Head coach: John Thompson Jr.
- AP: NR
- Coaches: NR
- AP: 2
- Coaches: 2
	1st half	2nd half	Total
Princeton Tigers	29	20	49
Georgetown Hoyas	21	29	50
- Date: March 17, 1989
- Venue: Providence Civic Center, Providence, Rhode Island
- Referees: Dick Paparo, Charles Range, J. Don Ferguson
- Attendance: 12,106

United States TV coverage
- Network: ESPN
- Announcers: Mike Gorman, Ron Perry

On March 17, 1989, during the first round of the 1989 NCAA Division I men's basketball tournament, the Georgetown University Hoyas played a college basketball game against the Princeton University Tigers at Providence Civic Center in Providence, Rhode Island. The Hoyas, who were seeded first in the East regional bracket, faced the Tigers, who were seeded 16th in the East.

The Hoyas, who were strong favorites, won by an unexpectedly narrow margin of 50–49, only securing their win by preventing a Princeton basket on the final possession of the game. Had Princeton won, they would have been the first 16-seed in tournament history to defeat a 1-seed, a feat that was not achieved until UMBC upset Virginia in 2018.

Media outlets have dubbed the Georgetown–Princeton match-up as "the game that saved March Madness". The game is credited with halting discussions to downsize the NCAA tournament by eliminating automatic bids for smaller conferences. It also reportedly factored into CBS's decisions to renew their NCAA contract later that year, and to obtain exclusive broadcasting rights for the first-round games two years later.

== Background ==
Georgetown entered the NCAA tournament with a 22–4 regular-season record, and a roster that included future NBA stars such as Alonzo Mourning and Dikembe Mutombo. They earned an automatic bid to the NCAA tournament by winning the Big East regular season and tournament titles, and were ranked second in both major polls.

Princeton came into the tournament with a 17–7 regular season record. They earned an automatic bid to the NCAA tournament by winning the Ivy League championship. In the three previous NCAA tournaments, the Ivy League representative had lost by an average of 40 points. Princeton was a 23-point underdog.

The matchup of Georgetown and Princeton was the very first game shown during the selection show, the televised event wherein the seeding and first-round games are announced. The game was set to take place at the Providence Civic Center in Providence, Rhode Island.

== Broadcast ==
Although CBS was the primary TV broadcaster of the 1989 tournament, the Georgetown–Princeton game was carried by ESPN. CBS had other programming lined up for primetime on Thursday and Friday of the tournament's opening weekend, and thus limited their first round coverage to the late-night slots. ESPN was left with 14 games across Thursday and Friday to pick from for their national coverage. The decision to air the Georgetown–Princeton game has been attributed to Tom Odjakian, who was in charge of ESPN's college basketball programming at the time. Interviewed in a 2015 documentary, Odjakian said he chose the game because he believed it had a higher ceiling for ratings in the unlikely event that it was a close game.

Ron Perry and Mike Gorman provided game commentary out of Providence Civic Center. From ESPN's studio, John Saunders and Dick Vitale provided color commentary and coverage of other tournament games before and after the game and during halftime. During the pre-game show, Vitale told Saunders "If Princeton can beat Georgetown, I'm going to hitchhike to Providence, which isn't that far from here. I'm going to be their ball boy on their next game and then I'm going to change into a Princeton cheerleading uniform. I'm going to lead all the cheers. 'Let's go Tigers. Let's go Tigers.'"

As the first half ended with Princeton leading by 8, Saunders and Vitale expressed their shock during ESPN's halftime coverage, with Saunders opening with the remark, "I guess 'speechless' would be the way to describe us here." After the game, Vitale wore a Princeton sweatshirt and praised the underdog's performance, remarking, "That would have been the greatest upset in the history of the NCAA tournament."

== Game summary ==
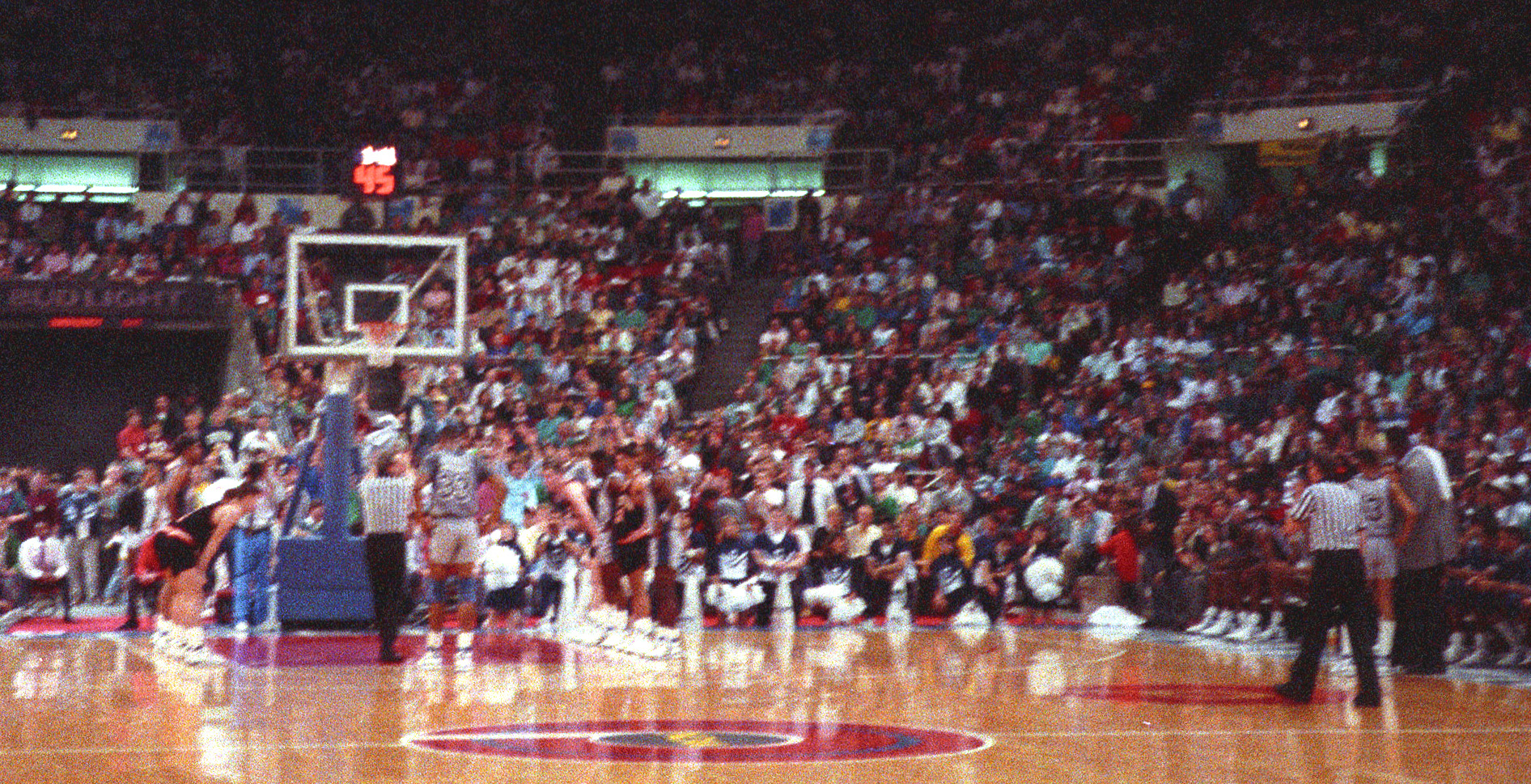
Freshman Alonzo Mourning of Georgetown shoots free throws with 1:41 left.

Princeton led Georgetown for most of the first half, and led 29–21 at halftime. Georgetown never held a lead until a basket by forward Sam Jefferson gave them a 39–37 lead with 10:25 to play in the second half.

The game remained close to the very end. With seconds left, Alonzo Mourning sunk a free throw to give Georgetown the 50–49 lead. With 15 seconds remaining, Princeton senior Bob Scrabis attempted a three-pointer but was blocked by Mourning, sending the ball out of bounds. Kit Mueller received the inbound pass with one second left to attempt a final shot, but Mourning executed another successful block as time expired.

== Box score ==
ESPN

Friday, March 17
7:07 PM EST

box score

#1 Georgetown Hoyas 50, #16 Princeton Tigers 49
Scoring by half: 29–21, 20–29
Pts: A. Mourning – 21; Rebs: A. Mourning – 13	Pts: R. Scrabis – 15; Rebs: G. Leftwich – 5 Asts: K. Mueller – 8

Providence Civic Center – Providence, Rhode Island
Attendance: 12,106
Referees: Dick Paparo, Charles Range, J. Don Ferguson

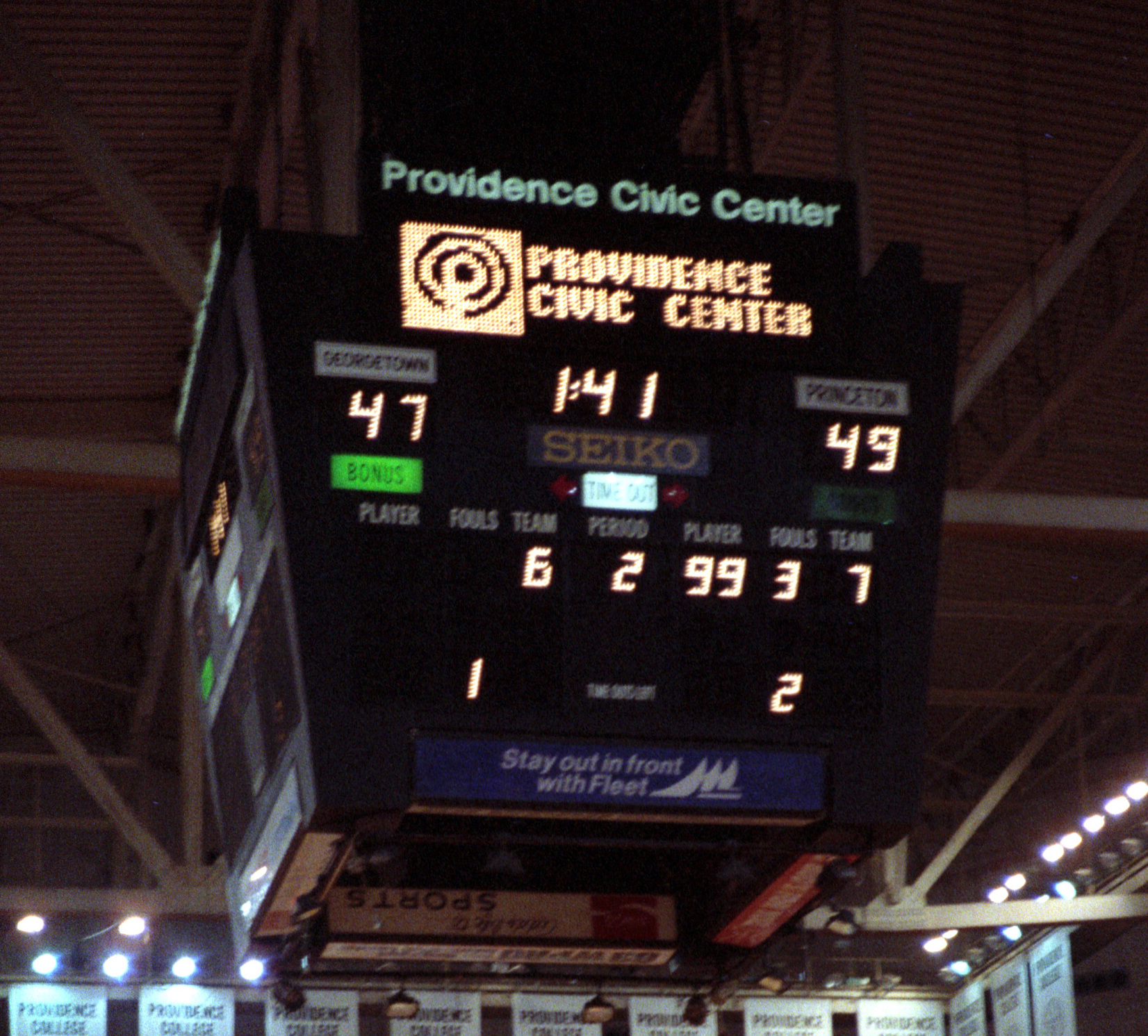
The scoreboard showing a narrow Princeton lead late in the second half

Legend
No.	Jersey number	Pos	Position	Min	Minutes played	FGM	Field goals made
FGA	Field goals attempted	3PM	Three-pointers made	3PA	Three-pointers attempted	FTM	Free throws made
FTA	Free throws attempted	OReb	Offensive rebounds	Reb	Rebounds	Ast	Assists
Stl	Steals	Blk	Blocks	TO	Turnovers	PF	Personal fouls
Pts	Points

Georgetown Hoyas
No.	Player	Pos	Min	FGM	FGA	3PM	3PA	FTM	FTA	OReb	Reb	Ast	Stl	Blk	TO	PF	Pts
33	Alonzo Mourning	C	38	8	11	0	0	5	6	7	13	0	0	7	1	3	21
13	Charles Smith	G	38	2	12	0	5	0	1	0	2	2	0	0	3	4	4
4	Bobby Winston	G/F	32	2	2	0	0	4	4	3	6	3	1	0	2	1	8
21	Jaren Jackson	F	30	2	4	0	0	1	2	2	3	1	0	0	1	1	5
20	Mark Tillmon	G	29	2	2	1	4	1	3	3	5	0	1	0	2	1	8
12	Dwayne Bryant	G	21	0	2	0	1	0	0	0	3	1	1	0	2	1	0
52	John Turner	F	8	1	1	0	0	0	2	0	0	0	0	1	1	1	2
50	Sam Jefferson	F	4	1	1	0	0	0	0	0	0	0	0	0	1	0	2
Team totals				19	42	1	10	11	18	15	32	7	3	8	13	12	50
Statistics from Sports-Reference.com

Princeton Tigers
No.	Player	Pos	Min	FGM	FGA	3PM	3PA	FTM	FTA	OReb	Reb	Ast	Stl	Blk	TO	PF	Pts
34	Bob Scrabis	F	40	6	13	2	6	1	2	1	2	2	2	0	1	2	15
00	Kit Mueller	C	40	4	11	0	1	1	2	0	3	8	2	1	2	3	9
22	George Leftwich	G	40	1	2	0	0	0	0	1	5	0	1	0	1	3	2
33	Matt Lapin	F	34	5	10	2	7	0	0	1	2	4	0	0	2	4	12
5	Jerry Doyle	G	27	4	6	0	1	0	0	0	0	0	1	0	0	4	8
12	Troy Hottenstein	G	13	1	1	1	1	0	0	0	1	0	0	0	1	3	3
55	Matt Eastwick	F	6	0	0	0	0	0	0	0	0	0	0	0	0	0	0
Team totals				21	44	5	16	2	5	3	13	14	6	1	7	19	49
Statistics from Sports-Reference.com

== Aftermath ==
As the NCAA tournament uses a single-elimination bracket, the Princeton Tigers were eliminated and their season was over. The Georgetown Hoyas advanced to the second round to face the 9th seeded Notre Dame Fighting Irish, who had defeated the 8th seeded Vanderbilt Commodores that same day to advance. The Hoyas went on to defeat the Fighting Irish in the second round and the 5th seeded NC State Wolfpack in the regional semifinals, before falling to the 2nd seeded Duke Blue Devils in the east regional final.

== Legacy ==
Sports Illustrated and Time have called it "the game that saved March Madness". Prior to this near-upset, the NCAA had been considering eliminating automatic tournament bids for smaller conferences such as Princeton's Ivy League; this game is widely credited with halting those discussions.

Airing in primetime on ESPN, the game garnered strong ratings, which drew the attention of network executives. The game is reported to have played a role in CBS's decision later that year to sign a new seven-year contract. Starting with the 1991 tournament two years later, CBS took over broadcasting responsibilities for all games from the first round.

== See also ==
- 1998 Harvard vs. Stanford women's basketball game
- 2018 UMBC vs. Virginia men's basketball game
- 2023 Fairleigh Dickinson vs. Purdue men's basketball game
