= Sean C. Jackson =

American artist

Sean C. Jackson is a New York-based artist known for his colorful, three-dimensional mazes.

== Career ==
Jackson has been creating maze-based artwork since he was ten years old. Inspired by Larry Evans's book 3-Dimensional Mazes, he began creating his own drawings based on the illustrations in the book. Much of Jackson's artwork is inspired by urban environments, and his process of building his mazes is often meant to reflect the expansion of cities. In 2017, Chronicle Books published Jackson's first book, From Here to There: A Book of Mazes to Wander and Explore. His second book, Star Wars Mazes, was published in 2021 by Chronicle in partnership with LucasFilm. His third book, Marvel Mazes, was published in 2022.
