= Bob Scrabis (American football) =

American football player (born 1936)

No. 49, 19
- Position: Quarterback

Personal information
- Born: March 26, 1936 (age 90); Pittsburgh, Pennsylvania, U.S.
- Listed height: 6 ft 3 in (1.91 m)
- Listed weight: 225 lb (102 kg)

Career information
- High school: Baldwin (PA)
- College: Penn State

Career history
- New York Titans (1960–1962)
- Stats at Pro Football Reference

Robert Denis Scrabis (born March 26, 1936) is an American former professional football player who was a quarterback with the New York Titans of the American Football League (AFL). He played college football for the Penn State Nittany Lions.

He is the father of Bob Scrabis, who was the 1989 Ivy League Men's Basketball Player of the Year. Scrabis has been a resident of Avon-by-the-Sea, New Jersey. From 1969 to 2012, he operated an auto dealership that he took over from his father-in-law in Lakewood, New Jersey.
