= Bob Scrabis (basketball) =

American basketball player

Personal information
- Born: c. 1967
- Listed height: 6 ft 3 in (1.91 m)

Career information
- High school: Red Bank Catholic (Red Bank, New Jersey)
- College: Princeton (1985–1989)
- NBA draft: 1989: undrafted
- Position: Forward
- Number: 34

Career highlights
- Ivy League Player of the Year (1989); 2× First-team All-Ivy League (1988, 1989)

Bob Scrabis (born c. 1967) is a former college basketball player for Princeton Tigers men's basketball. He is known for his participation in the 1989 Georgetown vs. Princeton men's basketball game, and was the 1989 Ivy League Men's Basketball Player of the Year. He is the son of professional gridiron football player Bob Scrabis.

== Early life ==
Scrabis is the son of Bob and Janis, and has two sisters, Amy and Kristin. His father played football at Penn State before playing in the American Football League for the New York Titans. Raised in Avon-by-the-Sea, New Jersey, Scrabis attended Red Bank Catholic High School where he played point guard and graduated as the school's all-time leading scorer. In high school, he was included in the Sports Illustrated "Faces in the Crowd" section of the March 12, 1984, edition of the magazine for a 23–24 free throw shooting performance in a victory over Long Branch High School. As a senior, he averaged 20.2 points, 10.2 rebounds and 3.5 assists.

== College career ==
Scrabis had several memorable performances in the Penn–Princeton men's basketball rivalry. As a sophomore, he hit a jumper with three seconds left to force overtime against Penn on February 3, 1987, but Princeton lost by a point. In the rematch held three weeks later, he established a career high with 24 points to lead Princeton to a 63–59 victory. In the March 1988 Penn–Princeton game, Scrabis connected on 2 free throws with 11 seconds remaining for the 67–65 victory over Penn.

On December 30, 1988, Scrabis helped defeat 16th-ranked South Carolina with a 26-point performance. In the final game of the regular season of his senior year on March 4, 1989, Scrabis scored 19 second half points to lead Princeton to a 74–63 Ivy League-clinching and NCAA Tournament bid-clinching victory over Harvard.

The March 17, 1989 Georgetown vs. Princeton men's basketball game was a first-round game in the 1989 NCAA Division I men's basketball tournament that pitted the number 1 seed Georgetown Hoyas against the number 16 seed Princeton Tigers. Scrabis took the first of two shots in the closing seconds of the game that were blocked by Alonzo Mourning to preserve a 50–49 margin of victory for Georgetown. He rebounded a missed free throw with 23 seconds remaining. Then, his three point shot was blocked with 8 seconds left. With 15 points, he was Princeton's high scorer in the game. Because of his role in preserving NCAA Division I men's basketball tournament invitations for lesser automatic bids, Bleacher Report described Scrabis as "the face of Cinderella".

Scrabis was an All-Ivy first team selection in 1988 and 1989 and earned Ivy League Men's Basketball Player of the Year in 1989. He ended his career as Princeton's 4th leading scorer (behind Bill Bradley, Pete Campbell and Craig Robinson). He played forward for Princeton. As a senior he served as captain of the 1988–89 Princeton Tigers men's basketball team.

== Professional career ==
In October 1989, following his basketball career he was invited to the training camp at Princeton's Jadwin Gym for the New Jersey Nets of the National Basketball Association by Willis Reed, but he was released after 9 days. He retired from basketball and eventually went into finance.
