= Craig Robinson (basketball) =

American basketball coach and brother of Michelle Obama

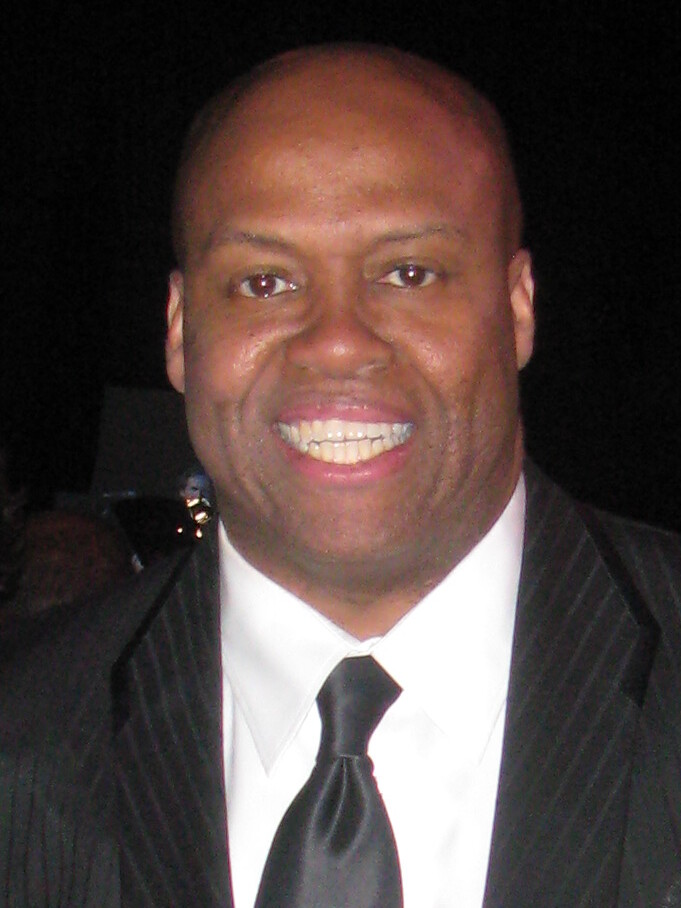
- Robinson at the 2009 Obama Home State Inauguration Ball

Biographical details
- Born: April 21, 1962 (age 64); Calumet Park, Illinois, U.S.

Playing career
- 1979–1983: Princeton
- Position: Forward

Coaching career (HC unless noted)
- 1988–1990: IIT (asst.)
- 1999–2000: Chicago Lab School
- 2000–2006: Northwestern (asst.)
- 2006–2008: Brown
- 2008–2014: Oregon State

Administrative career (AD unless noted)
- 2016–2017: Milwaukee Bucks (VP, player/org. development)
- 2017–2020: New York Knicks (VP, player/org. development)

Head coaching record
- Overall: 122–128 (.488)

Craig Malcolm Robinson (born April 21, 1962) is an American college basketball coach, basketball executive, and broadcaster. He is a former head men's basketball coach at Oregon State University and Brown University. He was a star forward as a player at Princeton University in the early 1980s and a bond trader during the 1990s. He currently is the executive director of the National Association of Basketball Coaches. He is the brother of former First Lady Michelle Obama and brother-in-law of former President of the United States Barack Obama.

== Early life ==
Craig Malcolm Robinson was born on April 21, 1962, in Calumet Park, Illinois, to Fraser Robinson, a city water plant employee and Democratic precinct captain, and Marian Robinson (née Shields), a secretary at Spiegel's catalog store. Robinson grew up in Chicago's South Shore with his younger sister, Michelle. He learned to read by the age of four at home and skipped the second grade in school. He attended the parochial Mount Carmel High School, graduating in 1979.

When Robinson was considering which college to go to, his father insisted that he attend Princeton University for its Ivy League academics, rather than either the University of Washington or Purdue University, which offered scholarships and major basketball conference play.

== Playing career ==
Robinson was a two-time Ivy League Player of the Year at Princeton University, in 1981–1982 and 1982–1983, leading the league in field goal percentage both years. He is the fourth highest scorer in school history. He graduated in 1983 with a B.A. in Sociology. His senior thesis was on social stratification in prisons. Robinson and former teammate John W. Rogers, Jr. were among those invited to practice with Michael Jordan as he prepared for his comeback.

Robinson was drafted in the fourth round of the 1983 NBA draft by the Philadelphia 76ers, but never played in the league. He played professionally for the Manchester Giants in the British Basketball League for two seasons and returned to the U.S. in 1988 to become an assistant coach at the Illinois Institute of Technology, a position he held until 1990.

== Business career ==
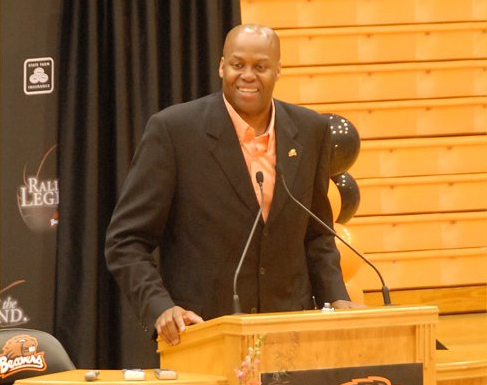
Robinson in 2008

Robinson left basketball partly on the advice of his Princeton coach Pete Carril and pursued a business degree, earning an M.B.A. in Finance from the University of Chicago Graduate School of Business in 1992. Robinson worked in the 1990s as a bond trader. He became a vice president at Continental Illinois Bank and worked there from 1990 to 1992. He was then a vice president, from 1992 to 1999, at Morgan Stanley Dean Witter. Later, he was a managing director and partner at Loop Capital Markets, a minority-owned boutique investment banking firm.

When Robinson's sister, Michelle, began dating her law firm colleague, Barack Obama, who played basketball recreationally, she asked her brother to play with Obama and give her a character assessment so that she would know whether she could become serious with him. He gave an encouraging report to her. As he later related, "When I played basketball with Barack, he was quietly confident, which means he had good self-esteem without being cocky. He was certainly a team player – he wasn't a pig, he passed when he was supposed to pass, and he cut when he was supposed to cut. To me, that speaks to a lack of selfishness. He had natural leadership ability because he didn't just pass me the ball because he was dating my sister. Whenever a player gets tired, he reverts to the player he truly is. That's how you tell. And we played for hours. That's how I could tell." The story of this pick-up game and of a "test" being passed became a key part of the Obama narrative.

While working in the business world, Robinson kept a hand in basketball by doing area scouting for Princeton and coaching one year at University of Chicago Laboratory Schools. He earned a high six-figure income in his business career, but he eventually decided the financial world had lost its appeal.

== Basketball career ==
Robinson returned to coaching in 1999, making one-tenth his former salary. He was an assistant for six years to Bill Carmody at Northwestern University, where he was an effective recruiter. He then became a head coach at Brown University in 2006, where he ran a variation of the Princeton offense which he learned from Pete Carril during his years at Princeton. In improving a mid-level basketball program, he stressed work ethic, used tough love, and tried to improve the players' vocabulary. Having placed fifth with a strong finish to the season garnered Robinson the Ivy League men's basketball Coach of the Year for the 2006–2007 season by Basketball-U.com. The following year, the Brown Bears finished second in the league, and their 19 wins for the season was a team record.

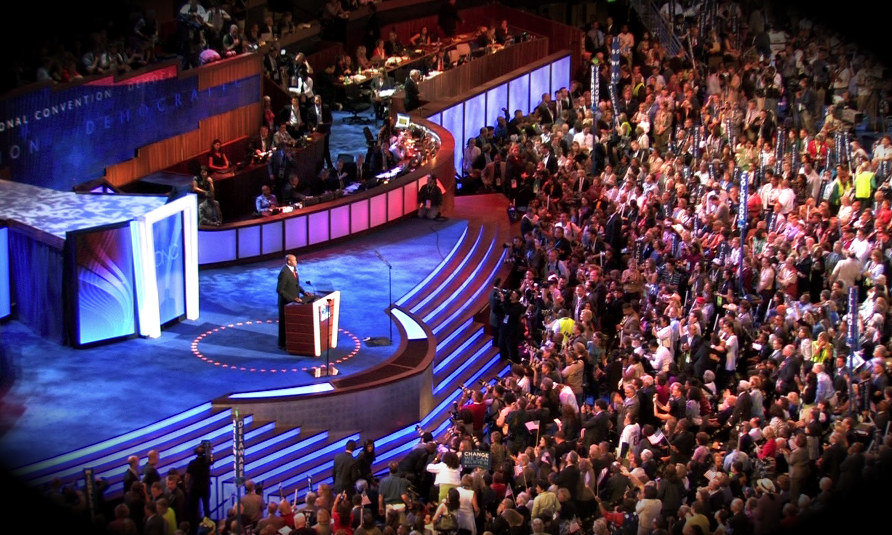
Robinson introducing his sister, Michelle Obama, at the 2008 Democratic National Convention.

Robinson assisted his brother-in-law throughout the latter's 2008 presidential campaign, including campaigning for him during the Iowa caucuses and campaigning and giving speeches for him in a number of other states, sometimes combining campaigning with recruiting visits. He introduced his sister Michelle before her speech on August 25, 2008, the first night of the 2008 Democratic National Convention, which gave him his largest national exposure. He was also on stage following Obama's victory speech in Grant Park after his election as president on November 4, 2008.

On April 7, 2008, Robinson was hired as the Oregon State Beavers' head basketball coach following the team's winless Pacific-10 Conference record and overall 6–25 mark the year before. (Jesse Agel, Robinson's assistant of two years, took over Robinson's former position at Brown.)

Oregon State got off to a fairly good start in Robinson's first year, starting with a 6–6 record; a January 2009 conference win over USC broke a nearly two-year Pac-10 losing streak and earned Robinson a congratulatory call from his brother-in-law, then-President-elect Obama. Robinson continued his tough-love approach, tailored to strengthening each player's weaknesses. After that first win, Robinson's team won another six Pac-10 games, exceeding expectations for his first year on the job, given that his personnel were essentially unchanged from the team's prior year. One key was that the offensive system he installed raised the team's collective field goal percentage almost 10 points. Some commentators felt he was deserving of consideration for the Pac-10 Coach of the Year award, and by late February, Robinson had hopes of the team getting a bid from one of the postseason tournaments. The team was indeed accepted into the 2009 College Basketball Invitational, where it went on to post a 5–1 record and captured its first post-season tournament championship ever with a final series victory over the UTEP Miners. Of the win, Robinson said, "I can't tell you how proud I am of these guys. ... This is a great story for anybody." The Beavers finished with an 18–18 record for the season and had what Rivals.com deemed a top-25 recruiting class as well.

In July 2009, President Obama alluded to the possibility of Robinson coaching elsewhere by saying: "Craig Robinson is an outstanding coach. ... Anybody in Oregon and anybody who knows sports knows he turned it around. He loves Corvallis, and I'm sure that as a young, successful coach, he's going to start getting offers." Oregon State's 2009–10 season featured an inconsistent level of play in a conference dominated by parity, leading to an 8–10 regular-season conference record for a tie for fifth place. They then lost in the first round of the Pac-10 tournament. Despite the losing record, the team was invited to defend their championship at the 2010 College Basketball Invitational, but lacked focus and energy and were beaten easily in the first round, leaving them with an overall season record of 14–18.

In March 2010, shortly before the end of the season, the university and Robinson agreed on a two-year contract extension that would keep him in place through the 2015–16 season. In April 2010, Robinson published his memoir, A Game of Character: A Family Journey from Chicago's Southside to the Ivy League and Beyond.

The 2010–2011 season was one of regression for Oregon State, with the team falling to a 5–13, ninth-place finish in the conference, and a sharply losing record overall. However, Robinson professed to not being overly worried or disappointed, saying he was encouraged by the development of some of the underclassmen. The Obamas showed their support for Robinson by attending an Oregon State game against Towson in November 2011. The 2011–2012 season saw a Robinson-era best for overall wins, 21, including a pair in the 2012 College Basketball Invitational, but a fourth consecutive losing record within the conference. It was the highest win total for the team since 1990, and the completion of it saw star guard Jared Cunningham leaving after his junior season and being selected in the NBA draft, the first Beaver to be drafted in over a decade. In June 2012, construction began on a $15 million basketball practice facility that Robinson and previous coaches had long been campaigning for.

Prior to the 2012–2013 season, Robinson characterized his squad as "probably the best team I've had." But the Beavers went in the opposite direction by suffering one of their worst seasons ever, with a penchant for second-half collapses and end-of-game failures. Attendance at Gill Coliseum fell to half capacity, and the student section lost enthusiasm. The team finished with a dead-last 4–14 record in the conference and a 14–18 mark overall. Fans began calling for a change in coaches, but the university athletic director said, "Coach Robinson is our coach, and this administration is in full support of him." Following the season, Robinson appeared on the CBS Sports Network as a studio analyst during the NCAA Men's Division I Basketball Championship tournament.

The 2013–2014 season saw the team improve to a 16–16 mark overall but have its sixth consecutive losing season in the conference. The team faced the loss of all five of its starters and its five top scorers following the season, due to graduation, transfers, and the like. In March 2014, the Pac-12 announced that Robinson would coach an all-star basketball team that would tour China in August. On May 5, 2014, Robinson was fired from his position as the Oregon State men's head basketball coach. He was given a $4 million buyout of the three remaining years on his contract. The team had failed to make the NCAA Men's Division I Basketball Championship or the National Invitation Tournament during Robinson's tenure. His overall 93–104 record did make him the fourth-winningest coach in team history.

The Milwaukee Bucks hired Robinson as vice president of player and organizational development on August 15, 2016. After one season, he left the Bucks to join the New York Knicks in a similar position.

== Broadcasting career ==
On October 7, 2014, ESPN announced the hiring of Robinson as a college basketball analyst. There, he began to work broadcasting games and doing studio work on ESPNU.

== After coaching ==
On July 13, 2020, Robinson was named the executive director of the National Association of Basketball Coaches.

Since March 2025, Robinson has hosted a weekly advice podcast called "IMO" alongside his sister, former First Lady Michelle Obama. The show, produced by Obama's Higher Ground Productions, features the siblings offering practical wisdom, relatable childhood anecdotes, and plenty of laughs while answering everyday and existential dilemmas submitted by their listeners. The podcast has featured many prominent guests, including former President Barack Obama, and Supreme Court Justice Ketanji Brown Jackson.

== Personal life ==
Robinson is the older brother of former U.S. First Lady Michelle Obama and the brother-in-law of former U.S. President Barack Obama. His marriage to his first wife Janis Robinson ended in divorce in 2000. Robinson has two children from his first marriage, a son Avery (born 1992) and a daughter Leslie (born 1996). Robinson remarried in June 2006 to Kelly Crum. They became parents of sons Austin in 2010 and Aaron in 2012. His daughter Leslie played for the Princeton Tigers women's basketball team as a forward.

== Head coaching record ==
Record table
Season	Team	Overall	Conference	Standing	Postseason
Brown Bears (Ivy League) (2006–2008)
2006–07	Brown	11–18	6–8	5th	
2007–08	Brown	19–10	11–3	2nd	CBI First Round
Brown:		30–28 (.517)	17–11 (.607)		
Oregon State Beavers (Pacific-10 / Pac-12 Conference) (2008–2014)
2008–09	Oregon State	18–18	7–11	8th	CBI champions
2009–10	Oregon State	14–18	8–10	5th	CBI First Round
2010–11	Oregon State	10–19	5–13	9th	
2011–12	Oregon State	21–15	7–11	9th	CBI Semifinals
2012–13	Oregon State	14–18	4–14	12th	
2013–14	Oregon State	16–16	8–10	10th	CBI First Round
Oregon State:		93–104 (.469)	39–69 (.362)		
Total:		123–132 (.482)			
National champion Postseason invitational champion Conference regular season champion Conference regular season and conference tournament champion Division regular season champion Division regular season and conference tournament champion Conference tournament champion
