= Princeton Tigers men's basketball =

Collegiate basketball program

2026–27 Princeton Tigers men's basketball team
- University: Princeton University
- First season: 1901; 125 years ago
- Head coach: Mitch Henderson (15th season)
- Location: Princeton, New Jersey
- Arena: Jadwin Gymnasium (capacity: 6,854)
- Conference: Ivy League
- Nickname: Tigers
- Colors: Black and orange
- All-time record: 1,671–1,044 (.615)

NCAA Division I tournament Final Four
- 1965
Other NCAA Division I tournament results
Elite Eight	1965
Sweet Sixteen	1952, 1955, 1961, 1964, 1965, 1967, 2023
Appearances	1952, 1955, 1960, 1961, 1963, 1964, 1965, 1967, 1969, 1976, 1977, 1981, 1983, 1984, 1989, 1990, 1991, 1992, 1996, 1997, 1998, 2001, 2004, 2011, 2017, 2023

Pre-tournament Helms national champions
- 1925

NIT champions
- 1975

Conference tournament champions
- 2017, 2023

Conference regular-season champions
- EIBL: 1922, 1925, 1932, 1950, 1952, 1955 Ivy League: 1960, 1961, 1963, 1964, 1965, 1967, 1969, 1976, 1977, 1981, 1983, 1984, 1989, 1990, 1991, 1992, 1996, 1997, 1998, 2001, 2002, 2004, 2011, 2017, 2022, 2023, 2024

Uniforms
Home	Away

The Princeton Tigers men's basketball team is the intercollegiate men's basketball program representing Princeton University. The school competes in the Ivy League in Division I of the National Collegiate Athletic Association (NCAA). The Tigers play home basketball games at the Jadwin Gymnasium in Princeton, New Jersey, on the university campus. Princeton has appeared in 25 NCAA tournaments, most recently in 2023. In 1965, the Tigers made the NCAA Final Four, with Bill Bradley being named the Most Outstanding Player. The team is currently coached by former player Mitch Henderson.

The team is known for the Princeton offense strategy, perfected under the tenure of former head coach Pete Carril, who coached the team from 1967 to 1996. The Princeton offense has resulted in Princeton leading the nation in scoring defense 20 times since 1976, including every year from 1989 to 2000. As of 2023, the Tigers have amassed 1803 victories, 25 NCAA Division I men's basketball tournament appearances (including four consecutive appearances between 1989 and 1992), and 30 Ivy League regular season titles. Their main Ivy League rivalry is with Penn.

Eight different Tigers have earned 12 All-American recognitions. Bill Bradley is the only three-time honoree. Numerous Tigers have played professional basketball. The most recent Tiger NBAer is Tosan Evbuomwan. Geoff Petrie was the NBA Rookie of the Year in 1971, while Brian Taylor earned the same honor in the American Basketball Association in 1973. Two of the three Ivy Leaguers to have played in the Olympic Games were Tigers. Four of the eight NBA and ABA championships earned by Ivy League players have been earned by Tigers. Three of the five highest NBA career point totals by Ivy League players were by Tigers. Five of the ten Ivy League players selected among the top 25 overall selections in the NBA draft were Tigers.

== Coaches ==
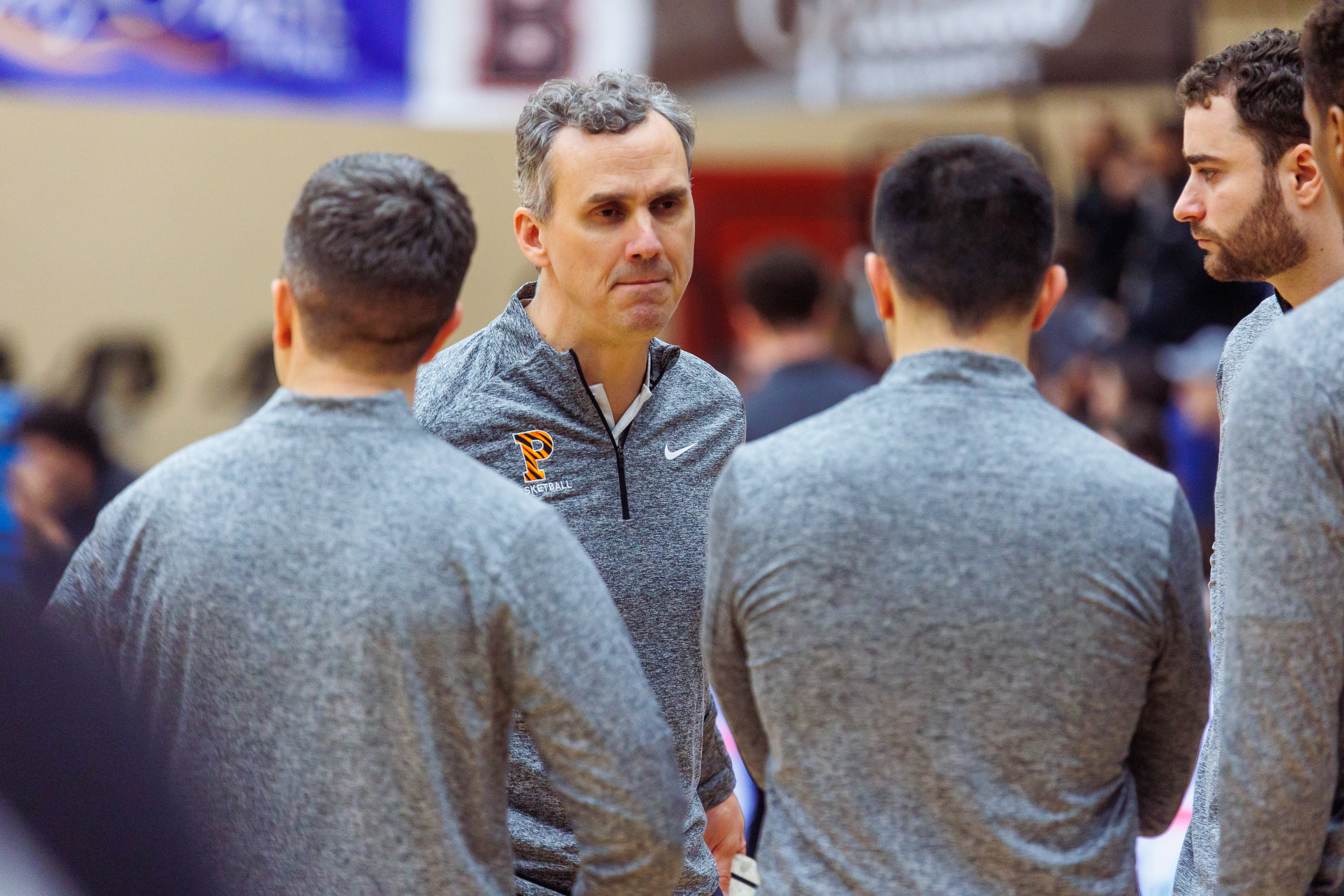
Mitch Henderson in 2023

Carril holds the Ivy League record for most career seasons, championships, and wins. Bill Carmody holds the career winning percentage record.

Coaching Records

Name	Years	Wins	Losses	Winning %
Mowbray Forney	1900–01	7	5	0.583
Augustus W. Enderbrock	1901–02	10	10	0.500
William Roper	1902–03	8	7	0.533
William McCoy	1903–04	10	5	0.667
Frederick Cooper	1904–06	13	15	0.464
William Kelleher	1906–07	4	10	0.286
C.F. Kogel	1907–08	7	10	0.412
Harry F. Shorter	1908–11	19	28	0.404
Harry Hough	1911–12	8	8	0.500
Frederick Leuhring	1912–20	100	43	0.699
Lou Sugarman	1920–21	11	4	0.733
James Hynson	1921	3	5	0.375
Hill Zahn	1921–23	36	9	0.800
Albert Wittmer	1923–32	115	86	0.572
Herbert (Fritz) Crisler	1932–34	32	11	0.744
John Jefferies	1934–35	6	14	0.300
Ken Fairman	1935–38	25	38	0.397
Franklin (Cappy) Cappon	1938–43 *	52	37	0.584
William Logan	1943–45	20	20	0.500
Leonard Hattinger	1945	5	8	0.385
Wes Fesler	1945–46	7	12	0.368
Franklin (Cappy) Cappon	1946–61 *	198	144	0.579
Jake McCandless	1961–62	22	16	0.579
Butch van Breda Kolff	1962–67	103	31	0.769
Pete Carril	1967–1996	514	261	0.663
Bill Carmody	1996–2000	92	25	0.787
John Thompson	2000–2004	68	42	0.618
Joe Scott	2004–2007	38	45	0.458
Sydney Johnson	2007–2011	66	53	0.555
Mitch Henderson	2011–present	147	84	0.636

== Arenas ==
Princeton originally played its home games at University Gymnasium until it burned down in 1944. Hobey Baker Memorial Rink served as the interim home court for the 1945–46 and 1946–47 seasons until Dillon Gymnasium was built. The 6,800-seat Jadwin Gymnasium hosted the Tigers for the first time on January 25, 1969, against the Penn Quakers men's basketball team. It continues to be the team's home court.

Name
University Gymnasium (1901–44)
Hobey Baker Memorial Rink (1945–47)
Dillon Gymnasium (1947–69)
Jadwin Gymnasium (1969–present)

== Ivy League ==
The Tigers have played against their Ivy League rivals for over a century.

Opponent	First Game	Last Game	W	L	PCT.	Home	Away	Neutral
Brown University	1908	2018	106	28	.791	62–6	44–22	—
Columbia University	1901	2018	153	86	.640	83–34	68–51	2–1
Cornell University	1902	2018	147	81	.645	87–27	59–52	1–2
Dartmouth College	1905	2018	152	63	.707	89–17	62-42	1–4
Harvard University	1901	2018	132	48	.733	77-14	54–34	1–0
University of Pennsylvania	1903	2018	113	126	.473	62–52	48-70	3–4
Yale University	1902	2018	150	89	.628	88–28	59–60	3–1

Through 2017–2018 season

== Awards and honors ==
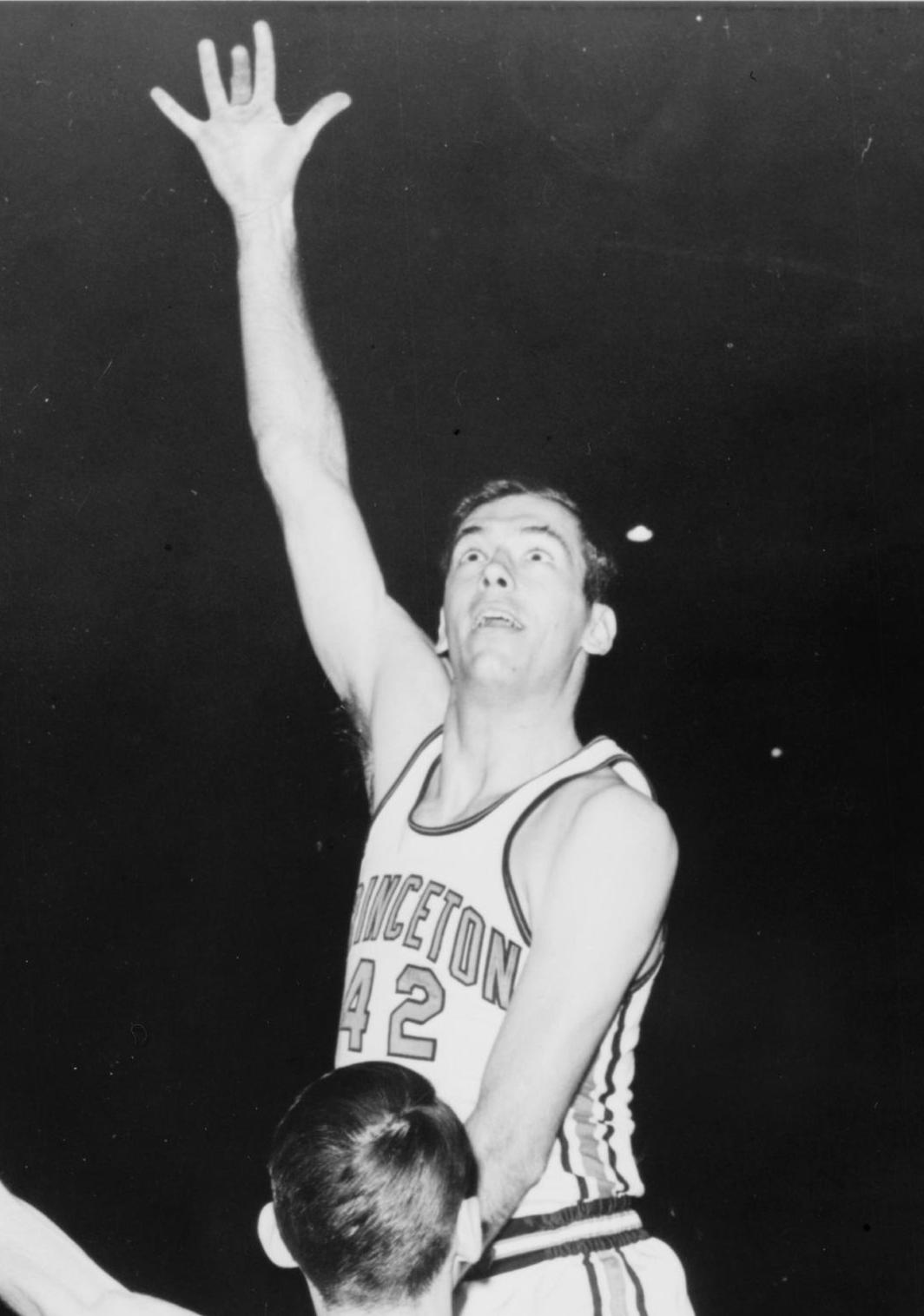
Bill Bradley playing in 1964

Bill Bradley has won numerous distinctions as a Princeton Tiger. He is the team's only Rhodes Scholar, and he is the only player to earn NCAA basketball tournament Most Outstanding Player. Other honors earned by Tiger basketball players include:

All-Americas

Year	Name
1905	Oliver deGray Vanderbilt
1913	Hamilton Salmon
1916	Cyril Haas
1917	Cyril Haas
1922	Arthur Loeb
1923	Arthur Loeb
1926	Carl Loeb
1963	Bill Bradley
1964	Bill Bradley
1965	Bill Bradley
1972	Brian Taylor
1998	Steve Goodrich
2013	Ian Hummer

Ivy League Men's Basketball Player of the Year

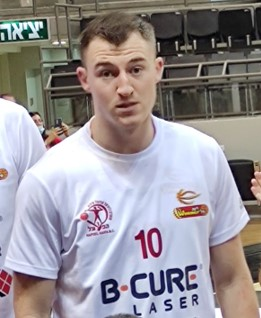
Spencer Weisz

Year	Name
1976	Armond Hill
1977	Frank Sowinski
1982	Craig Robinson
1983	Craig Robinson
1989	Bob Scrabis
1990	Kit Mueller
1991	Kit Mueller
1992	Sean Jackson
1997	Sydney Johnson
1998	Steve Goodrich
1999	Brian Earl
2013	Ian Hummer
2017	Spencer Weisz
2024	Caden Pierce

Ivy League Rookie of the Year

Year	Name
1971	Brian Taylor
1977	Bob Roma
1992	Rick Hielscher
1999	Chris Young
2001	Konrad Wysocki
2014	Spencer Weisz
2023	Caden Pierce

Ivy League Defensive Player of the Year

Year	Name
2011	Kareem Maddox
2017	Myles Stephens

Ivy League Coach of the Year

Year	Name
2017	Mitch Henderson

Academic All-Americas

Year	Name	Designation
1965	Bill Bradley	First Team
1982	Gordon Enderle	Honorable Mention
1988	Bill Bradley	Hall of Fame
1990	Kit Mueller	Third Team
1991	Kit Mueller	First Team
1998	Steve Goodrich	Second Team

Olympians

Year	Name	Designation
1964	Bill Bradley	United States
2008	Konrad Wysocki	Germany
2024	Kareem Maddox	United States

Maddox appeared in the 3x3 basketball competition.

College Basketball Hall of Fame

Year	Name	Designation
1999	Bill Bradley	Player
1997	Pete Carril	Coach

Basketball Hall of Fame

Year	Name	Designation
1983	Bill Bradley	Player
1997	Pete Carril	Coach

== Professional basketball ==
Princeton NBA players were Bud Palmer, Willem van Breda Kolff, Bradley, Geoff Petrie, John Hummer, Taylor, Ted Manakas, Armond Hill, Mike Kearns and Steve Goodrich.

Tosan Evbuomwan is the only active Princeton NBA player.

David Blatt, now an Israeli-American, played for Princeton in 1977–81 and then became a professional basketball player and subsequently a coach (most recently, for the Cleveland Cavaliers).

NBA/ABA Championships

Year	Name	Designation
1970 New York Knicks	Bill Bradley	1970 Finals
1973 New York Knicks	Bill Bradley	1973 Finals
1974 New York Nets	Brian Taylor	1974 Finals
1976 New York Nets	Brian Taylor	1976 Finals

NBA Experience

School	NBA Alumni	NBA Games	Last Played
Princeton	10	2,668	2001–02
Penn	12	2,176	2002–03
Dartmouth	7	1,748	1994–95
Columbia	5	1,068	1978–79
Yale	3	976	2002–03
Cornell	3	176	2011–12 (As of April 19, 2012)
Harvard	3	118	2011–12 (As of April 19, 2012)
Brown	3	63	1953–54

NBA draft

Name	Year	Team	Selection
Bernie Adams	1950	Philadelphia	
Carl Belz	1959	Philadelphia	9th, 62
Reggie Bird	1972	Atlanta	4th rd, 55
Bill Bradley	1965	N.Y. Knicks	before 1st rd, territory
Jim Brangan	1960	Philadelphia	6th, 47
Pete Campbell	1962	Chicago	10th rd, 79
John Haarlow	1968	N.Y. Knicks	13th rd, 177
Barnes Hauptfuhrer	1976	Houston	3rd rd, 43
Joe Heiser	1968	Baltimore	6th rd, 68
Armond Hill	1976	Atlanta	1st rd, 9
Ed Hummer	1967	Boston	6th rd, 64
John Hummer	1970	Buffalo	1st rd, 15
Mike Kearns	1951	Philadelphia	
Ted Manakas	1973	Atlanta	3rd rd, 36
Kevin Mullin	1984	Boston	4th rd, 93
Geoff Petrie	1970	Portland	1st rd, 8th
Andy Rimol	1974	Buffalo	10th rd, 170
Craig Robinson	1983	Philadelphia	4th rd, 93
Bob Roma	1979	Kansas City	6th rd, 126
Bill Ryan	1984	N.J. Nets	9th rd, 200
Rich Simkus	1983	N.J. Nets	10th rd, 222
Frank Sowinski	1978	N.J. Nets	9th rd, 171
Brian Taylor	1972	Seattle	2nd rd, 23
Chris Thomforde	1969	N.Y. Knicks	7th rd, 96
Tim van Blommesteyn	1975	N.Y. Knicks	9th rd, 153

== Records ==
Bradley continues to hold the single-game, single-season, and career total and average points Ivy League records. In addition, he holds the Ivy records for single-game, single-season, and career field goals made as well as single-season, and career free throws made. Other Tiger Ivy League record holders include Howard Levy (1982–85, career field goal percentage), Alan Williams (1986–87, single-season field goal percentage), Brian Earl (1995–99, career three-point field goals made), Spencer Gloger (vs- Ala.-Birmingham, December 18, 1999, single-game three-point field goals made), Sydney Johnson (-vs- Columbia & Cornell, Feb 28 – March 1, 1997, consecutive three-point field goals made; single-game three-point field goals made with no misses), Dave Orlandini (1986–88, career three-point field goal percentage; 1987–88 single-season three-point field goal percentage).

National records

- Combined single-game Three-point field goal field goal percentage (minimum 20 made): 72.4%—Princeton (12 of 15) vs. Brown (9 of 14), February 20, 1998
- Combined single-game points (Since 1986, which is either the three-point shot or shot clock era): 62—Monmouth (41) vs. Princeton (21), December 14, 2005
- Single-season three-point field goal percentage (Min. 200 made): 49.2%—Princeton, 1988 (211 of 429)
- Longest annual rivalry Princeton–Yale: Since 1902 (tied with Columbia–Yale, Princeton–Penn is second since 1903)

NCAA Men's Division I Basketball Championship Tournament records

- Free throws made in 100% effort: Bradley (16 vs. St. Joseph's, 1st R, November 3, 1963)
- Single-game points scored in a final four: Bradley 58 Princeton vs. Wichita St., N3d, 3-20- 1965
- Single-game field goals made (final four): Bradley 22 Princeton vs. Wichita St., N3d, 3-20- 1965
- Victory margin (final four): 36 Princeton (118) vs. Wichita St. (82), N3d, March 20, 1965
- Points in a half, team (final four): 65, Princeton vs. Wichita St., N3d, March 20, 1965 (2d half, 2nd team to do so)
- Single-year two-game points scored (final four): 87, Bill Bradley, Princeton, 1965
- Single-year two-game field goals made (final four): 34, Bill Bradley, Princeton, 1965

Selected former records NCAA Men's Division I Basketball Championship Tournament records

- Single-game free throw percentage (final four, minimum 10 made): 93.3% (14–15), Bradley, Princeton vs. Wichita St., N3d, March 25, 1965 (broken March 23, 1972)
- Points in a half, both teams (final four): 108, Princeton (65) vs. Wichita St. (43), N3d, March 20, 1965 (2d) (broken March 25, 1972)
- Single-year two-game free throw percentage (final four, minimum 12 made): 95.0% (19–20), Bill Bradley, Princeton, 1965 (broken 1972)
- Single-year two-game field goals made (final four): 78, Princeton, 1965 (broken 1977)

Former national records

- Fewest points allowed (Since 1986): 28–66 Dartmouth, February 10, 1990 (broken on January 11, 1991)
- Fewest points allowed (Since 1986): 27–55 Yale, January 11, 1991 (broken on March 2, 1992)
- Fewest combined points (Since 1986): 76 (43–33) vs. Colgate, November 30, 1988 (broken on December 16, 1989)
- Single-season team defense (Since 1965): 52.9, 1976 (broken 1977)
- Single-season team defense (Since 1965): 51.7, 1977 (broken 1980)
- Single-season team assists-turnover ratio (Since 1993): 1.63 (486:302), 1998 (broken 2005)
- Consecutive home victories: Princeton over Brown 52, 1929–2002 (broken by North Carolina over Clemson 54 and active through 2009)

National statistical champions

- Field goal percentage: 70.3% Alan Williams 163 of 232, 1987
- Three-point field goal percentage: 53.4% Matt Lapin 71 of 133, 1990
- Free throw percentage: 88.6% Bill Bradley, 273 of 308, 1965
- Free throw percentage: 90.0% Joe Heiser, 117 of 130, 1968
- Won-loss percentage: 93.1% team, 27 of 29, 1998
- Scoring defense: 52.9, 1976; 51.7, 1977; 55.8, 1979; 52.0, 1983; 50.1, 1984; 55.0, 1986; 53.0, 1989; 51.0, 1990; 48.9, 1991; 48.2, 1992; 54.7, 1993; 52.3, 1994; 57.7, 1995; 51.7, 1996; 53.4, 1997; 51.4, 1998; 52.7, 1999; 54.6, 2000; 53.3, 2007; 53.3, 2010.
- Field goal percentage: 54.1% team, 601 of 1111, 1987
- Three-point field goals/game: 8.12 team, 1988
- Three-point field percentage: 49.2 team, 1988, 45.2 team, 1990
- Assists-turnover ratio: 1.63 team (486:302), 1998
- Fewest turnover/game: 10.14 team (294/29), 1998
- The 1925 team was retroactively named as a national champion by the Helms Athletic Foundation and was ranked as the nation's top college team by the Premo-Porretta Power Poll; neither designations are recognized by the NCAA as official national championships, despite the NCAA referencing Helms's historical findings.

Selected notable statistics

- Bradley was the second to post a 2000-point/1000-rebound three-year career (Oscar Robertson).
- Weisz became the only player in Princeton career history to amass 1,000 points, 500 rebounds, 300 assists, and 200 3-pointers.
- The 27-point comeback from 13 to 40 with 15:11 remaining to win 50–49 over Penn on February 9, 1999, remains the fifth-largest comeback and fourth-largest second-half comeback in NCAA history. That game's 9–33 half time deficit comeback remains the second-largest comeback.
- 14 of the top 25 single-season team defensive averages since 1965 have been by Princeton.
- Princeton ranked in the top 10 nationally in win percentage in both the 1960s (72.6, 188–71, 10th), and 1990s (76.1, 210–66, 8th).
- Last Princeton team ranked in the polls during the season and at the end of the season was the 1997–98 team, which was ranked in all but the first three polls (15 weeks) of the season and finished the season 8th.
- Other ranked teams according to the AP Poll 1950–51 (2 weeks, peak 18, finished unranked), 1966–67 (9 weeks, peak 3, finished 5), 1967–68 (2 weeks, peak 8, finished unranked, but 15 by UPI since AP was only top 10 at the time), 1971–72 (3 weeks, peak 14, finished unranked), 1974–75 (2 weeks, peak 12, finished 12), 1975–76 (2 weeks, peak 15, finished unranked, but 19T by UPI), 1990–91 (6 weeks, peak 18, finished 18).

== Postseason ==
Princeton has appeared in 26 NCAA Division I men's basketball tournaments, 7 National Invitation Tournaments (NIT), 2 College Basketball Invitationals (CBI) and 8 Ivy League one-game playoffs.

=== NCAA tournaments ===
NCAA tournament seeding history

The NCAA began seeding the NCAA Division I men's basketball tournament with the 1979 edition. The 64-team field started in 1985, which guaranteed that a championship team had to win six games.

Years →	'81	'83	'84	'89	'90	'91	'92	'96	'97	'98	'01	'04	'11	'17	'23
Seeds →	11	12	12	16	13	8	11	13	12	5	15	14	13	12	15
Round →	1	2	1	1	1	1	1	2	1	2	1	1	1	1	S16

The Tigers have a 15–30 record in the NCAA tournament.

Year	Field Size	Round	Opponent	Result
1952	16	Sweet Sixteen; Regional third-place game	Duquesne; Dayton	L 49–60; L 61–77
1955	24	Sweet Sixteen; Regional third-place game	La Salle; Villanova	L 46–73; L 57–64
1960	25	First round	Duke	L 60–84
1961	24	First round Sweet Sixteen; Regional third-place game	George Washington; St. Joseph's; St. Bonaventure	W 84–67; L 67–72; L 67–85
1963	25	First round	St. Joseph's	L 81–82
1964	25	First round Sweet Sixteen; Regional third-place game	VMI; Connecticut; Villanova	W 86–60; L 50–52; L 62–74
1965	23	First round Sweet Sixteen; Elite Eight; Final Four; National third-place game	Penn State; North Carolina State; Providence; Michigan; Wichita State	W 60–58; W 66–48; W 109–69; L 76–93; W 118–82
1967	23	First round Sweet Sixteen; Regional third-place game	West Virginia; North Carolina; St. John's	W 68–57; L 70–78 ^{OT} W 78–58
1969	25	First round	St. John's	L 63–72
1976	32	First round	Rutgers	L 53–54
1977	32	First round	Kentucky	L 58–72
1981	48	First round	BYU	L 51–60
1983	52	Preliminary Round; First round Second round	North Carolina A&T; Oklahoma State; Boston College	W 53–41; W 56–53; L 42–51
1984	56	Preliminary Round; First round	San Diego; UNLV	W 65–56; L 56–68
1989	64	First round	Georgetown	L 49–50
1990	64	First round	Arkansas	L 64–68
1991	64	First round	Villanova	L 48–50
1992	64	First round	Syracuse	L 43–51
1996	64	First round Second round	UCLA; Mississippi State	W 43–41; L 41–63
1997	64	First round	California	L 52–55
1998	64	First round Second round	UNLV; Michigan State	W 69–57; L 56–63
2001	65	First round	North Carolina	L 48–70
2004	65	First round	Texas	L 49–66
2011	68	First round	Kentucky	L 57–59
2017	68	First round	Notre Dame	L 58–60
2023	68	First round Second Round; Sweet Sixteen	Arizona; Missouri; Creighton	W 59–55; W 78–63; L 75–86

In 2011 the round of 64 was the second round

=== NIT ===
Year	Field Size	Round	Opponent	Result
1972	16	First; Quarterfinal	Indiana; Niagara	W 68–60; L 60–65
1975	16	First; Quarterfinal; Semifinal; Final	Holy Cross; South Carolina; Oregon; Providence	W 84–63; W 86–67; W 58–57; W 80–69
1999	32	First; Second; Quarterfinal	Georgetown; North Carolina State; Xavier	W 54–47; W 61–58; L 58–65
2000	32	First	Penn State	L 41–55
2002	40	First	Louisville	L 65–66
2016	32	First	Virginia Tech	L 81–86^{OT}
2022	32	First	VCU	L 79–90
2024	32	First	UNLV	L 77–84

=== CBI ===
Year	Field Size	Round	Opponent	Result
2010	16	First; Quarterfinal; Semifinal	Duquesne; IUPUI; Saint Louis	W 65–51; W 74–68 ^{OT} L 59–69
2014	16	First; Quarterfinal	Tulane; Fresno State	W 56–55; L 56–72
