= Pete Carril =

American basketball coach (1930–2022)

Personal information
- Born: July 10, 1930 Bethlehem, Pennsylvania, U.S.
- Died: August 15, 2022 (aged 92) Philadelphia, Pennsylvania, U.S.

Career information
- College: Lafayette (1948–1952)
- Coaching career: 1954–2011

Career highlights
- NIT champion (1975); 13× Ivy League champion (1968, 1969, 1976, 1977, 1980, 1981, 1983, 1984, 1989–1992, 1996)
- Basketball Hall of Fame
- Collegiate Basketball Hall of Fame

Peter Joseph Carril (/kəˈrɪl/; July 10, 1930 – August 15, 2022) was an American basketball coach. He is best known as head coach of Princeton University for 30 years and for his use of the "Princeton offense". He also coached at Lehigh University and as an assistant with the Sacramento Kings in the National Basketball Association (NBA).

== Early life and education ==
Carril was born in Bethlehem, Pennsylvania, on July 10, 1930. His father José emigrated from León, Spain and was employed as a steelworker at Bethlehem Steel for four decades and brought up his son as a single father. His mother Angelina Rodriguez Carril was a native of Argentina.

Carril was a 1948 graduate of Liberty High School in his hometown, where he was an all-state selection for Pennsylvania.

He then studied at Lafayette College in Easton, Pennsylvania, playing college basketball for the Lafayette Leopards under Butch van Breda Kolff. Carril was honored as a Little All-American during his senior year in 1952. While at Lafayette, he became a member of Delta Tau Delta International Fraternity. He earned a Bachelor of Arts in Spanish from Lafayette in 1952.

After graduating from college, he served briefly in the U.S. Army. He later obtained a Master of Arts in Educational Administration from Lehigh University in Bethlehem, Pennsylvania in 1959.

== Career ==
=== High school coaching ===
In 1954, Carril was hired as the junior varsity basketball coach and ninth grade Pennsylvania history teacher at Easton Area High School in Easton, Pennsylvania. Four years later, in 1958, Carril was named the varsity coach at Reading Senior High School in Reading, Pennsylvania, where Gary Walters, the former Princeton Tigers athletic director and earlier Princeton basketball point guard played basketball under him at Liberty High School.

=== Lehigh University ===
Carril's first experience as a college basketball head coach was his lone season in 1966–67 at Lehigh University where he led the Engineers to an 11–12 record.

=== Princeton University ===
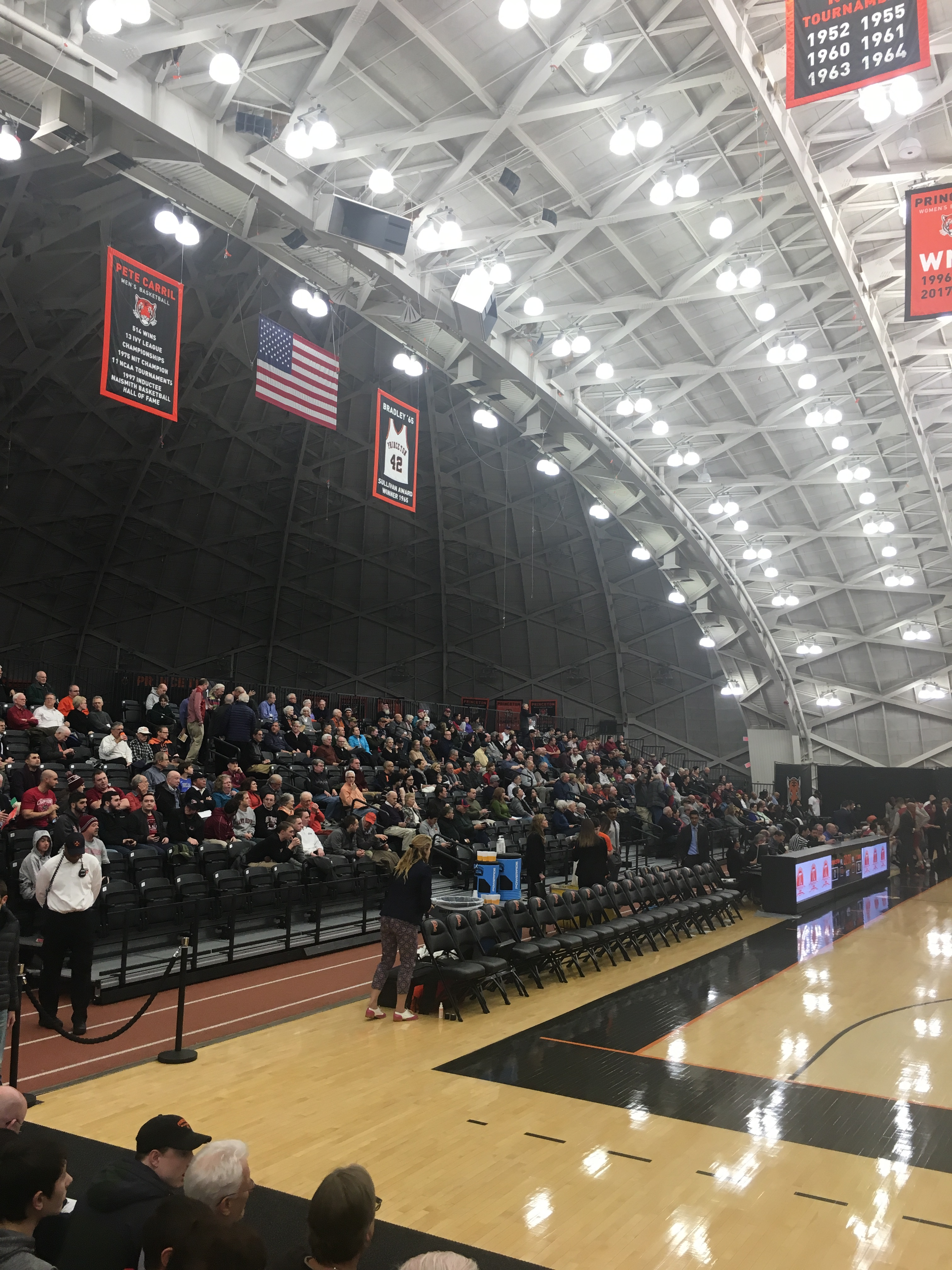
Princeton University's Jadwin Gymnasium features a banner (upper left) celebrating Carril's coaching accomplishments with the Princeton Tigers

He was appointed in a similar capacity at Princeton University on 7 May 1967, succeeding his mentor Butch van Breda Kolff who had recommended him for the position. In 29 years, he compiled a 514–261 (.663 winning percentage) record. He is also the only men's coach to win 500 games without the benefit of athletic scholarships for his players. He won or shared 13 Ivy League championships and led the Tigers to 11 NCAA tournaments and 2 NITs. The Tigers won the NIT championship in 1975.

Carril's Tigers had the nation's best scoring defense in 14 out of 21 years from 1975 to 1996, including eight in a row from 1988 to 1996. Games against Princeton were typically low-scoring affairs; for example, the 1990–91 and 1991–92 Tigers are the only teams to hold opponents below 50 points per game since the shot clock became mandatory for the 1985–86 season. Partly due to these factors, while his Tigers only won three NCAA Tournament games and never survived the tournament's opening weekend, they were known as a very dangerous first-round opponent; seven of their first round losses were by fewer than ten points.

In 1989, Princeton took first-ranked Georgetown down to the wire, leading by eight points at halftime before losing 50–49. Had the Tigers won, they would have been the first #16 seed to defeat a #1 seed since the NCAA began seeding the tournament field in 1979. Seven years later, Carril's final collegiate victory was an upset of defending national champions UCLA in the first round of the NCAA tournament in 1996 by a score of 43–41, in what is considered one of the greatest upsets of all time.

=== Collegiate record and accolades ===
Carill's career collegiate coaching record, including one season at Lehigh University in Bethlehem, Pennsylvania, was 525–273. He was enshrined in both the National Collegiate Basketball Hall of Fame and the Naismith Memorial Basketball Hall of Fame in 1997, following his retirement from Princeton.

=== Sacramento Kings ===
Carril was an assistant coach for the Sacramento Kings of the National Basketball Association for 10 years until his retirement in 2006. After Rick Adelman became Sacramento's head coach before the 1998–99 season, Carril helped Adelman install the Princeton offensive game plan and oversaw the Kings' development into one of the NBA's most potent offensive teams. During his tenure, the Kings were noted for their quick-passing offense, as well as their ability to stymie double teaming attempts from their opponents. In 2007, he volunteered as a coach with the Washington Wizards. He subsequently rejoined the Kings as an assistant for the 2009 season.

== Personal life ==
Carril was married to Dolores Halteman. They had two children: Peter and Lisa. They eventually divorced.

Carril suffered a heart attack in 2000, which spurred him to quit smoking Macanudo cigars.

== Death ==
He died on August 15, 2022, at the Hospital of the University of Pennsylvania in Philadelphia. He was 92, and suffered a stroke prior to his death.

== Head coaching record ==
Record table
Season	Team	Overall	Conference	Standing	Postseason
Lehigh Engineers (NCAA University Division independent) (1966–1967)
1966–67	Lehigh	11–12			
Lehigh:		11–12 (.478)			
Princeton Tigers (Ivy League) (1967–1996)
1967–68	Princeton	20–6	12–2	T–1st	
1968–69	Princeton	19–7	14–0	1st	NCAA University Division First Round
1969–70	Princeton	16–9	9–5	3rd	
1970–71	Princeton	14–11	9–5	T–3rd	
1971–72	Princeton	20–7	12–2	2nd	NIT Quarterfinal
1972–73	Princeton	16–9	11–3	2nd	
1973–74	Princeton	16–10	11–3	T–2nd	
1974–75	Princeton	22–8	12–2	2nd	NIT Champion
1975–76	Princeton	22–5	14–0	1st	NCAA Division I First Round
1976–77	Princeton	21–5	13–1	1st	NCAA Division I First Round
1977–78	Princeton	17–9	11–3	T–2nd	
1978–79	Princeton	14–12	7–7	3rd	
1979–80	Princeton	15–15	11–3	T–1st	
1980–81	Princeton	18–10	13–1	T–1st	NCAA Division I First Round
1981–82	Princeton	13–13	9–5	T–2nd	
1982–83	Princeton	20–9	12–2	1st	NCAA Division I Second Round
1983–84	Princeton	18–10	10–4	1st	NCAA Division I First Round
1984–85	Princeton	11–15	7–7	T–4th	
1985–86	Princeton	13–13	7–7	T–4th	
1986–87	Princeton	16–9	9–5	T–2nd	
1987–88	Princeton	17–9	9–5	3rd	
1988–89	Princeton	19–8	11–3	1st	NCAA Division I First Round
1989–90	Princeton	20–7	11–3	1st	NCAA Division I First Round
1990–91	Princeton	24–3	14–0	1st	NCAA Division I First Round
1991–92	Princeton	22–6	12–2	1st	NCAA Division I First Round
1992–93	Princeton	15–11	7–7	4th	
1993–94	Princeton	18–8	11–3	2nd	
1994–95	Princeton	16–10	10–4	T–2nd	
1995–96	Princeton	22–7	12–2	T–1st	NCAA Division I Second Round
Princeton:		514–261 (.663)	310–96 (.764)		
Total:		525–273 (.658)			
National champion Postseason invitational champion Conference regular season champion Conference regular season and conference tournament champion Division regular season champion Division regular season and conference tournament champion Conference tournament champion

== Publications ==
- Carril, Pete; White, Dan (1997). The Smart Take from the Strong: The Basketball Philosophy of Pete Carril. New York: Simon & Schuster. ISBN 978-0-684-83510-5.
