= Princeton offense =

Offensive strategy in basketball

The Princeton offense is an offensive basketball strategy which emphasizes constant motion, back-door cuts, picks on and off the ball, and disciplined teamwork. It was used and perfected at Princeton University by Pete Carril, though its roots may be traced back to Franklin “Cappy” Cappon, who coached Princeton in the late 1930s, and Bernard "Red" Sarachek, who coached at Yeshiva University from 1938 to 1977.

== Concept ==
The offense is designed for a unit of five players who can each pass, shoot, and dribble at an above-average level. These players hope to isolate and exploit a mismatch using these skills. Positions become less important and on offense there is no point guard, shooting guard, small forward or power forward. However, there are certain rules that players running this offense are expected to follow.

The offense usually starts out with four players outside the three-point arc with one player at the top of the key. The ball is kept in constant motion through passing until a player without the ball cuts toward the unoccupied area under and around the basket, and receives the ball for a layup. The post player is a very important player in the offense. He or she sets up in the high post and draws attention to their positioning. When the ball is received in to the post the players main objective is to find back door cutters or defenders who have fallen asleep on the weak side.

The hallmark of the offense is the backdoor cut, where a player on the wing suddenly moves in towards the basket behind a defender, receives a bounce pass from a guard on the perimeter, and (if done correctly) finds himself with no defenders between him and a layup. Alternatively, when the defensive team attempts to pack the paint to prevent backdoor cuts, the offense utilizes three point shots from the perimeter. All five players in the offense—including the center—should be competent at making a three-point attempt, further spreading the floor, and not allowing the defense to leave any player unattended.

The offense is often a very slowly developing one, relying on a high number of passes, and is often used in college basketball by teams facing opponents with superior athletic talent in order to maintain a low-scoring game (believing that a high-scoring game would favor the athletically superior opponent). As a result, Princeton has led the nation in scoring defense 19 times, including in every year from 1989 to 2000.

== Use at Princeton ==
During his tenure as head coach of Princeton University (1967–1996), Pete Carril compiled a 514–261 record, a .658 winning percentage. His teams won 13 Ivy League championships during his 29-year tenure with the Tigers, and received 11 NCAA Tournament bids and two National Invitation Tournament berths. Princeton captured the NIT title in 1975. Perhaps Carril's greatest win was his final upset victory, a 43 - 41 win over defending national champion UCLA on a backdoor cut at the end of a first-round game in the 1996 NCAA Tournament. The win extended Carril's retirement by one game and is ranked as one of the best NCAA upsets of all time. Former Princeton coach Sydney Johnson and his predecessors Bill Carmody, John Thompson III, and Joe Scott have all employed the Princeton offense.

== Other examples of use ==
=== National Basketball Association ===
After his retirement from Princeton in 1996, Pete Carril served as an assistant coach for the National Basketball Association's Sacramento Kings until 2006. During his time with Sacramento, Carril helped Rick Adelman, who became the Kings' head coach in 1998, implement the Princeton offense. Carril returned to the Kings during the 2008–2009 season as a consultant.

Back in 2012, the Cleveland Cavaliers, Los Angeles Lakers, New Orleans Hornets, New Jersey Nets, and Washington Wizards ran versions of the Princeton offense. Rick Adelman introduced a modified version of Pete Carril's system to the Houston Rockets during the 2007–2008 season. Coach Alvin Gentry also implemented an altered version of it that shows similarities to the triangle offense during the Phoenix Suns′s 2012–13 season. Eddie Jordan implemented the Princeton offense as coach of the Washington Wizards (from 2003 to 2008) and the Philadelphia 76ers (from 2009 to 2010). Mike Brown tried to use the Princeton with the 2012–13 Los Angeles Lakers for five regular season games (four losses) before he and the coaching staff were fired.

=== College basketball ===
==== NCAA Division I ====
Besides Princeton, some of the NCAA Division I college basketball teams best known for using the offense are:

- Air Force under Joe Scott, a former Carril player and protégé and former Princeton head coach
- American under Mike Brennan, a former Princeton player and assistant coach
- Brown under Craig Robinson, a former Princeton player and Northwestern assistant coach
- University of Colorado, under head coach Jeff Bzdelik
- Denver under former Princeton coach Joe Scott
- Georgetown under John Thompson III, who played under Carril at Princeton and was later Princeton′s head coach
- Holy Cross under Bill Carmody, another Carril protégé and a former Princeton head coach
- Miami under Charlie Coles
- North Dakota under Brian Jones
- Pennsylvania under Steve Donahue, runs the "shuffle offense," loosely based on Princeton principles.
- Notre Dame women's basketball under Muffet McGraw
- Oregon State under Craig Robinson, a former Princeton player and Northwestern assistant coach
- Richmond under Chris Mooney, a former Princeton player and assistant coach at Air Force
- Samford under Jimmy Tillette
- Southern California under Tim Floyd
- Virginia under Tony Bennett, loosely based on the general principles of the Princeton offense
- Wisconsin, under coach Bo Ryan, ran the "swing offense," which was loosely based on the Princeton offense
- William & Mary under Brian Earl, a former Princeton player and assistant coach

==== NCAA Division II ====
NCAA Division II colleges that have used the Princeton offense include:

- Alabama-Huntsville under Lennie Acuff
- Christian Brothers under Mike Nienaber
- Rollins under Tom Klusman
- Seattle Pacific under Jeff Hironaka

==== NCAA Division III ====
NCAA Division III colleges that have used the Princeton offense include:

- Maryville under Kevin Carroll
- St. Thomas, (St. Paul, Minnesota) under John Tauer
- Nebraska Wesleyan University under Dale Wellman
- Maine Maritime Academy (2017–2024) under Dan McNeely

==== NAIA ====
NAIA colleges that have used the Princeton offense include:

- Westmont under John Moore
- Covenant under Lance Richardson

NJCAA

NJCAA colleges that have used the Princeton offense include:

- Mercer County Community College under Howard Levy, a former Princeton player.
- Bergen Community College (Paramus, New Jersey) under Will Caraballo.

=== High schools ===
High school basketball teams that have used the Princeton offense include:

- Northridge High School (Johnstown, OH) 2008-2012 under John Wheeler
- Oak Forest High School (Oak Forest, IL) 2008-2020 under Matt Manzke
- Regent Prep (Tulsa, Oklahoma) under Kerwin Dees

==== Canada ====
- Cardinal Leger Secondary School (Brampton, Ontario) under Steve Pettit
- Sir Winston Churchill Secondary School (Vancouver, British Columbia) under Kevin Sandher
- Mark R. Isfeld Secondary School (Courtenay, B.C.) under Tom Elwood

==== United States ====
- Arkansas Christian Academy (Bryant, Arkansas)under Ben Thomas
- Benton Central Junior-Senior High School (Oxford, Indiana) under David Baxter
- Christian Brothers Academy (Lincroft, New Jersey) under Ed Wicelinski
- Gibson Southern High School (Fort Branch, Indiana) under Jerry O'Brien
- Holy Cross High School (Delran, New Jersey) under Barry Harper
- Indian Springs School (Indian Springs Village, Alabama) under Pete Arner
- Lincoln County High School in West Hamlin, West Virginia, under Rodney Plumley
- Memorial High School (Houston, Texas) under David Lay and under Jyusef Larry
- Haverford School (Haverford, Pennsylvania) under Bernie Rogers
- Lower Merion High School (Ardmore, Pennsylvania) under Greg Downer
- Blair Academy (Blairstown, New Jersey) under Joe Mantegna
- De La Salle High School (New Orleans) (New Orleans, Louisiana) under Paul Kelly a former Samford associate coach

=== AAU, YBOA, and USBA ===
Amateur Athletic Union, Youth Basketball of America, and United States Basketball Association teams that have used the Princeton offense include:

- 43 Express Basketball (Georgia) under Chad Jackson, Sr.
- KY Grind Basketball (Kentucky) under Lee DeForest
