= Field goal percentage =

Statistic in basketball

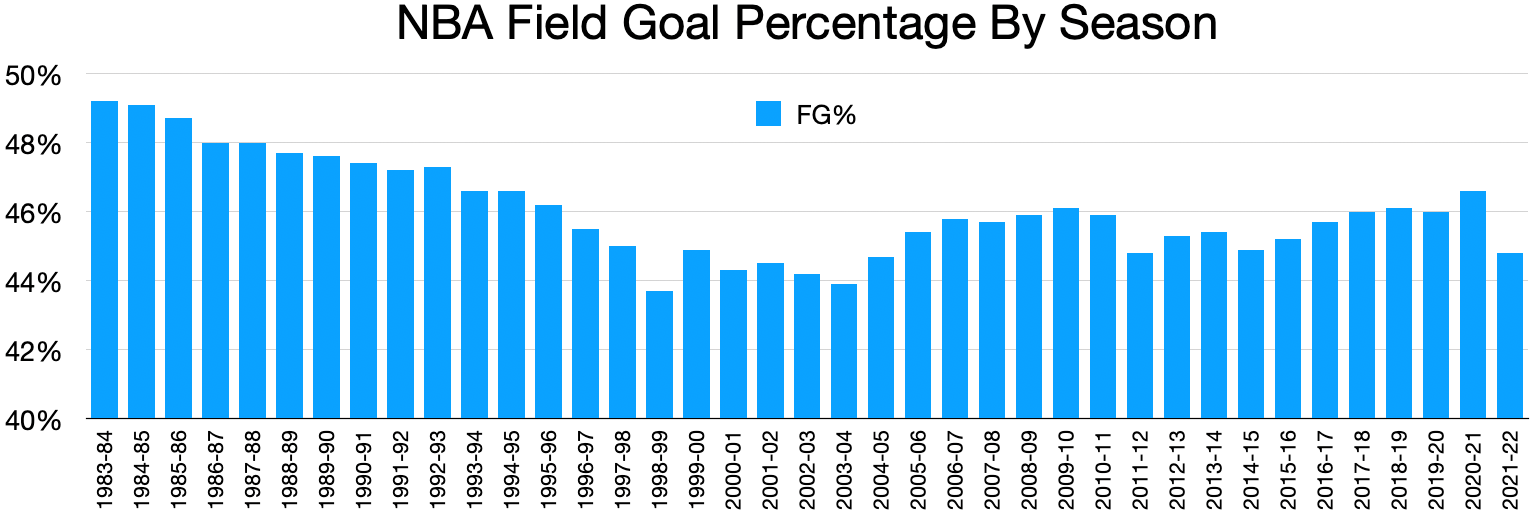
NBA FG% by season

Field goal percentage in basketball is the ratio of field goals made to field goals attempted. Its abbreviation is FG%. Although three-point field goal percentage is often calculated separately, three-point field goals are included in the general field goal percentage. Instead of using scales of 0 to 100%, the scale .000 to 1.000 is commonly used. A higher field goal percentage generally denotes higher efficiency.

In basketball, a FG% of .500 (50%) or above is considered a good percentage, although this criterion does not apply equally to all positions. Guards usually have lower FG% than forwards and centers. Field goal percentage does not completely tell the skill of a player, but a low field goal percentage can indicate a poor offensive player or a player who takes many difficult shots.

In the NBA, center Shaquille O'Neal had a high career FG% (.582) because he played near the basket making many high percentage layups and dunks. Guard Allen Iverson often had a low FG% (around .420) because he took the bulk of his team's shot attempts, even with high difficulty shots.

The NBA career record for field goal percentage is held by DeAndre Jordan at .6734. Currently, the highest field goal percentage record for a single season is .7419 by New York Knicks center Mitchell Robinson which was set during the abbreviated 2019–20 NBA season. Before Mitchell Robinson, NBA Hall of Fame player Wilt Chamberlain held the record from 1971-1972 to 2019-2020 with a season high field goal percentage of .7270.

Field goal percentages were substantially lower in the NBA until the mid-to-late 1960s. For this reason, many early NBA stars have low field goal percentages, such as Bob Cousy at .375, and George Mikan, Bob Pettit, and Bill Russell, whose career field goal percentages of .404, .436 and .440 respectively, are much lower than later post players.

Three-point field goal percentage and free throw percentage are usually kept as additional statistics. Their abbreviations are 3FG% and FT%, respectively. A 3FG% of .400 and above is a very good percentage, while a FT% of .900 or above is well regarded.

== See also ==
- 50–40–90 club, an exclusive group of players with one criterion being shooting at least 50 percent of field goals
- List of National Basketball Association top individual field goal percentage seasons
