= Princeton Tigers men's basketball statistical leaders =

The Princeton Tigers men's basketball statistical leaders are individual statistical leaders of the Princeton Tigers men's basketball program in various categories, including points, assists, blocks, rebounds, and steals. Within those areas, the lists identify single-game, single-season, and career leaders. The Tigers represent Princeton University in the NCAA's Ivy League.

Princeton began competing in intercollegiate basketball in 1900. However, the school's record book does not generally list records from before the 1950s, as records from before this period are often incomplete and inconsistent. Since scoring was much lower in this era, and teams played much fewer games during a typical season, it is likely that few or no players from this era would appear on these lists anyway.

The NCAA did not officially record assists as a stat until the 1983–84 season, and blocks and steals until the 1985–86 season, but Princeton's record books includes players in these stats before these seasons. These lists are updated through the end of the 2019–20 season.

== Scoring ==
Career
Rk	Player	Points	Seasons
1	Bill Bradley	2503	1962–63 1963–64 1964–65
2	Ian Hummer	1625	2009–10 2010–11 2011–12 2012–13
3	Douglas D. Davis	1550	2008–09 2009–10 2010–11 2011–12
4	Christopher J. (Kit) Mueller	1546	1987–88 1988–89 1989–90 1990–91
5	Devin Cannady	1515	2015–16 2016–17 2017–18 2018–19
6	Peter Campbell	1451	1959–60 1960–61 1961–62
7	Craig Robinson	1441	1979–80 1980–81 1981–82 1982–83
8	Brian Earl	1428	1995–96 1996–97 1997–98 1998–99
9	Bob Scrabis	1365	1985–86 1986–87 1987–88 1988–89
10	Myles Stephens	1346	2015–16 2016–17 2017–18 2018–19

Season
Rk	Player	Points	Season
1	Bill Bradley	936	1963–64
2	Bill Bradley	885	1964–65
3	Bill Bradley	682	1962–63
4	Brian Taylor	676	1971–72
5	Brian Taylor	563	1970–71
6	Geoff Petrie	541	1968–69
7	Ian Hummer	515	2011–12
8	Xaivian Lee	507	2024–25
9	Peter Campbell	501	1959–60
10	Bud Haabestad	500	1954–55

Single game
Rk	Player	Points	Season	Opponent
1	Bill Bradley	58	1964–65	Wichita State
2	Bill Bradley	51	1964–65	Harvard
3	Bill Bradley	49	1963–64	Cornell
4	Bill Bradley	47	1963–64	Wisconsin
5	Bill Bradley	46	1963–64	Texas
6	Bill Bradley	41	1964–65	Michigan
	Bill Bradley	41	1964–65	Columbia
	Bill Bradley	41	1964–65	Providence
9	Bill Bradley	40	1962–63	St. Joseph's
	Bill Bradley	40	1963–64	Army
	Bill Bradley	40	1964–65	Cornell

== Rebounds ==
Career
Rk	Player	Rebounds	Seasons
1	Bill Bradley	1008	1962–63 1963–64 1964–65
2	David E. (Whitey) Fulcomer	995	1955–56 1956–57 1957–58
3	Carl I. Belz	898	1956–57 1957–58 1958–59
4	Alfred W. Kaemmerlen	828	1959–60 1960–61 1961–62
5	Ian Hummer	725	2009–10 2010–11 2011–12 2012–13
6	Caden Pierce	710	2022–23 2023–24 2024–25
7	Christopher M. Thomforde	709	1966–67 1967–68 1968–69
8	Andrew G. Rimol	617	1971–72 1972–73 1973–74
9	Spencer Weisz	605	2013–14 2014–15 2015–16 2016–17
10	John B. Haarlow	578	1965–66 1966–67 1967–68

Season
Rk	Player	Rebounds	Season
1	David E. (Whitey) Fulcomer	406	1955–56
2	Bill Bradley	360	1963–64
3	Alfred W. Kaemmerlen	347	1961–62
4	Bill Bradley	243	1964–65
5	Alfred W. Kaemmerlen	335	1960–61
6	Carl I. Belz	333	1958–59
7	Carl I. Belz	328	1956–57
8	Bill Bradley	306	1962–63
9	David E. (Whitey) Fulcomer	304	1956–57
10	David E. (Whitey) Fulcomer	285	1957–58

Single game
Rk	Player	Rebounds	Season	Opponent
1	Carl I. Belz	29	1958–59	Rutgers
2	David E. (Whitey) Fulcomer	27	1955–56	Rutgers
	David E. (Whitey) Fulcomer	27	1955–56	Cornell
	Alfred W. Kaemmerlen	27	1960–61	Lafayette
5	David E. (Whitey) Fulcomer	26	1955–56	Dartmouth
	Carl I. Belz	26	1956–57	Pennsylvania
7	Donald H. Swan	24	1955–56	Harvard

== Assists ==
Career
Rk	Player	Assists	Seasons
1	William F. Ryan	413	1980–81 1981–82 1982–83 1983–84
2	Spencer Weisz	383	2013–14 2014–15 2015–16 2016–17
3	Christopher J. (Kit) Mueller	381	1987–88 1988–89 1989–90 1990–91
4	T. J. Bray	374	2010–11 2011–12 2012–13 2013–14
5	John Thompson III	347	1984–85 1985–86 1986–87 1987–88
6	Tosan Evbuomwan	323	2019–20 2021–22 2022–23
7	Amir Bell	313	2014–15 2015–16 2016–17 2017–18
8	Ian Hummer	308	2009–10 2010–11 2011–12 2012–13
9	Mitch Henderson	304	1994–95 1995–96 1996–97 1997–98
10	Xaivian Lee	301	2022–23 2023–24 2024–25

Season
Rk	Player	Assists	Season
1	Xaivian Lee	165	2024–25
2	William F. Ryan	161	1983–84
3	Tosan Evbuomwan	158	2022–23
4	Tosan Evbuomwan	142	2021–22
5	Christopher J. (Kit) Mueller	140	1989–90
6	T. J. Bray	133	2013–14
7	Mitch Henderson	131	1997–98
8	Christopher J. (Kit) Mueller	128	1990–91
9	Spencer Weisz	125	2016–17
10	T. J. Bray	119	2011–12

Single game
Rk	Player	Assists	Season	Opponent
1	T. J. Bray	13	2013–14	Penn State
	Spencer Weisz	13	2016–17	Liberty
3	William F. Ryan	12	1981–82	Brown
	William F. Ryan	12	1983–84	Yale
	William F. Ryan	12	1983–84	Columbia
	Xaivian Lee	12	2024–25	Penn
7	Christopher J. (Kit) Mueller	11	1989–90	Dayton
	Christopher J. (Kit) Mueller	11	1989–90	Columbia
	Christopher J. (Kit) Mueller	11	1990–91	Brown
	Xaivian Lee	11	2024–25	Rutgers

== Steals ==
Career
Rk	Player	Steals	Seasons
1	Sydney Johnson	169	1993–94 1994–95 1995–96 1996–97
2	William F. Ryan	167	1980–81 1981–82 1982–83 1983–84
	George H. Leftwich	167	1988–89 1989–90 1990–91 1991–92
4	Will Venable	156	2001–02 2002–03 2003–04 2004–05
	Marcus J. Schroeder	156	2006–07 2007–08 2008–09 2009–10
6	T. J. Bray	150	2010–11 2011–12 2012–13 2013–14
7	Joseph Scott	144	1983–84 1984–85 1985–86 1986–87
	Gabriel Lewullis	144	1995–96 1996–97 1997–98 1998–99
9	Mitch Henderson	142	1994–95 1995–96 1996–97 1997–98
10	Brian Earl	140	1995–96 1996–97 1997–98 1998–99
	Ian Hummer	140	2009–10 2010–11 2011–12 2012–13

Season
Rk	Player	Steals	Season
1	Armond Hill	73	1975–76
2	Timothy S. van Blommesteyn	72	1974–75
3	Mitch Henderson	65	1997–98
4	Armond Hill	63	1974–75

Single game
Rk	Player	Steals	Season	Opponent
1	Michael G. Steuerer	8	1975–76	Columbia
	Randy W. Melville	8	1980–81	Colgate
3	George H. Leftwich	7	1991–92	Dartmouth
	Sydney Johnson	7	1994–95	Brown
	Marcus J. Schroeder	7	2009–10	Wagner
	Steven D. Cook	7	2014–15	Stony Brook
7	Armond Hill	6	1975–76	William & Mary
	S. William Omeltchenko	6	1976–77	Notre Dame
	Frank S. Sowinski	6	1976–77	Cornell
	Stephen Mills	6	1980–81	Pennsylvania
	George H. Leftwich	6	1990–91	Lafayette
	George H. Leftwich	6	1990–91	Lehigh
	Gabriel Lewullis	6	1998–99	Yale
	Nathan W. Walton	6	2000–01	Penn
	Kyle M. Wente	6	2002–03	Harvard
	Douglas D. Davis	6	2010–11	Dartmouth
	T. J. Bray	6	2011–12	Columbia
	T. J. Bray	6	2012–13	Wagner
	Tosan Evbuomwan	6	2021–22	Columbia

== Blocks ==
Career
Rk	Player	Blocks	Seasons
1	Richard S. Hielscher	159	1991–92 1992–93 1993–94 1994–95
2	Chris Young	145	1998–99 1999–00
3	Ian Hummer	109	2009–10 2010–11 2011–12 2012–13
4	Kareem Maddox	108	2007–08 2008–09 2009–10 2010–11
5	Peter M. Miller	103	2013–14 2014–15 2015–16 2016–17
6	Richard V. Simkus	98	1979–80 1980–81 1981–82 1982–83
7	Craig Robinson	97	1979–80 1980–81 1981–82 1982–83
8	Steve Goodrich	88	1994–95 1995–96 1996–97 1997–98
9	Myles Stephens	80	2015–16 2016–17 2017–18 2018–19
10	Ilan M. Ramati	60	1974–75 1975–76
	Thomas A. Young	60	1976–77 1977–78 1978–79

Season
Rk	Player	Blocks	Season
1	Chris Young	90	1999–00
2	Kareem Maddox	56	2010–11
3	Chris Young	55	1998–99
4	Richard S. Hielscher	47	1991–92
5	Richard S. Hielscher	43	1993–94
6	Richard S. Hielscher	39	1994–95
	Ian Hummer	39	2011–12
8	Ilan M. Ramati	36	1975–76
9	Peter M. Miller	35	2014–15
	Peter M. Miller	35	2015–16

Single game
Rk	Player	Blocks	Season	Opponent
1	Chris Young	9	1999–00	Ohio
2	Ilan M. Ramati	7	1975–76	William & Mary
	Richard S. Hielscher	7	1991–92	Franklin & Marshall
	Chris Young	7	1999–00	Xavier
	Zachary J. Finley	7	2007–08	Chaminade
6	Richard S. Hielscher	6	1994–95	Rutgers
	Richard S. Hielscher	6	1994–95	Yale
	Chris Young	6	1999–00	Yale
	Chris Young	6	1999–00	Brown
	Patrick E. Saunders	6	2008–09	Penn
	Robert J. Garbade	6	2012–13	TCNJ
