= 1959–60 Princeton Tigers men's basketball team =

American college basketball season

1959–60 Princeton Tigers men's basketball
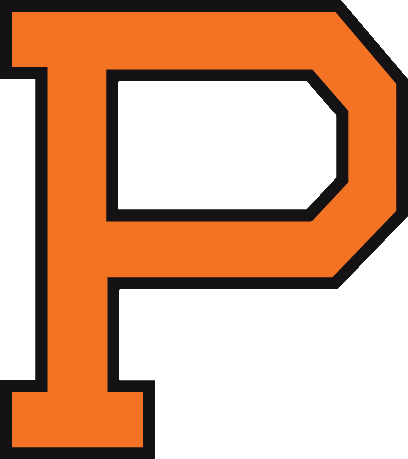

Ivy League Champions

1960 NCAA Division I men's basketball tournament, Lost first round
- Conference: Ivy League
- Record: 15–9 (11–3, 1st Ivy)
- Head coach: Franklin Cappon
- Captain: Jim Brangan
- Home arena: Dillon Gymnasium

The 1959–60 Princeton Tigers men's basketball team represented Princeton University in intercollegiate college basketball during the 1959–60 NCAA University Division men's basketball season. The head coach was Franklin Cappon and the team captain was Jim Brangan. The team played its home games in the Dillon Gymnasium in Princeton, New Jersey. The team was the champion of the Ivy League, earning an invitation to the 25-team 1960 NCAA Division I men's basketball tournament. During the following the season, Jake McCandless would take over as head coach.

The team posted a 15–9 overall record and an 11–3 conference record. The team lost its NCAA Division I men's basketball tournament East region first round contest against the Duke Blue Devils by an 84–60 margin at Madison Square Garden on March 8, 1960.

Peter C. Campbell, who won the conference in scoring title with a 23.0 points per game average in conference games, and Jim Brangan were both first team All-Ivy League selections, and Brangan was drafted by the Philadelphia Warriors in the 9th Round of the 1960 NBA draft with the 47th overall selection.

During the season, Campbell set several of his records, including single-season points (501) and single-season points per game (20.9). Both records surpassed Bud Haabestad's 1954–55 performances (500 and 20.0), and both were surpassed by Bill Bradley during the 1963–64 season (682 and 27.3). While establishing these records he also established the single-season field goals made record of 183, which Bradley would eclipse with 212. Donald Swan led the conference in field goal percentage with a 54.1%.
