= 1954–55 Princeton Tigers men's basketball team =

American college basketball season

1954–55 Princeton Tigers men's basketball
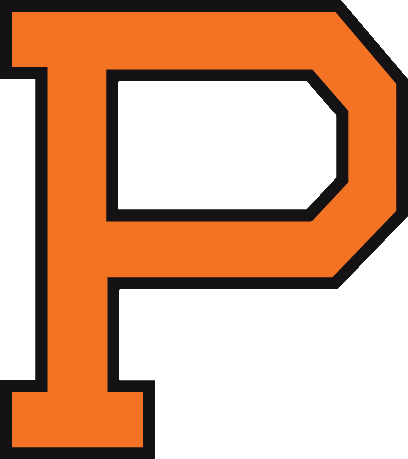

EIBL Champions

EIBL One-game playoff, Won 1955 NCAA Division I men's basketball tournament, Regional 4th place
- Conference: Eastern Intercollegiate Basketball League
- Record: 13–11 (11–4, 1st EIBL)
- Head coach: Franklin Cappon
- Captain: Bud Haabestad
- Home arena: Dillon Gymnasium

The 1954–55 Princeton Tigers men's basketball team represented Princeton University in intercollegiate college basketball during the 1954–55 NCAA men's basketball season. The head coach was Franklin Cappon and the team captain was Bud Haabestad The team played its home games in the Dillon Gymnasium on the university campus in Princeton, New Jersey. The team was the winner of the Eastern Intercollegiate Basketball League.

The team posted a 13–12 overall record and an 11–4 conference record. During the season, the team lost seven of its first eight games. After ending the regular season tied for the conference lead, the team won a one-game playoff against the Columbia Lions on March 9, 1955, at New Brunswick, New Jersey, by an 86–69 margin for the EIBL championship. The team earned an invitation to the twenty-four-team 1955 NCAA Division I men's basketball tournament, where it earned a bye before it lost to the La Salle Explorers by a 73–46 margin on March 11, 1955, at the Palestra in Philadelphia in the second round and then subsequently lost to the Villanova Wildcats by a 64–57 margin the next night in a consolation game.

During the season, Haabestad established numerous Princeton scoring standards, including being the first Tiger basketball player to score 500 points in a season and 1000 in a career. Peter C. Campbell broke several of his records. Campbell broke the following records during the 1959–60 season: single-season points (500) and single-season points per game (20.0). He broke the following records during the 1961–62 season: career points (1292), career points per game (18.2), career field goals made (458) and career free throws made (376). Haabestad's career free throws made record surpassed Arthur Loeb's records of 342 set during the 1924–25 season.
