= Franklin Cappon =

American athlete and coach (1900–1961)

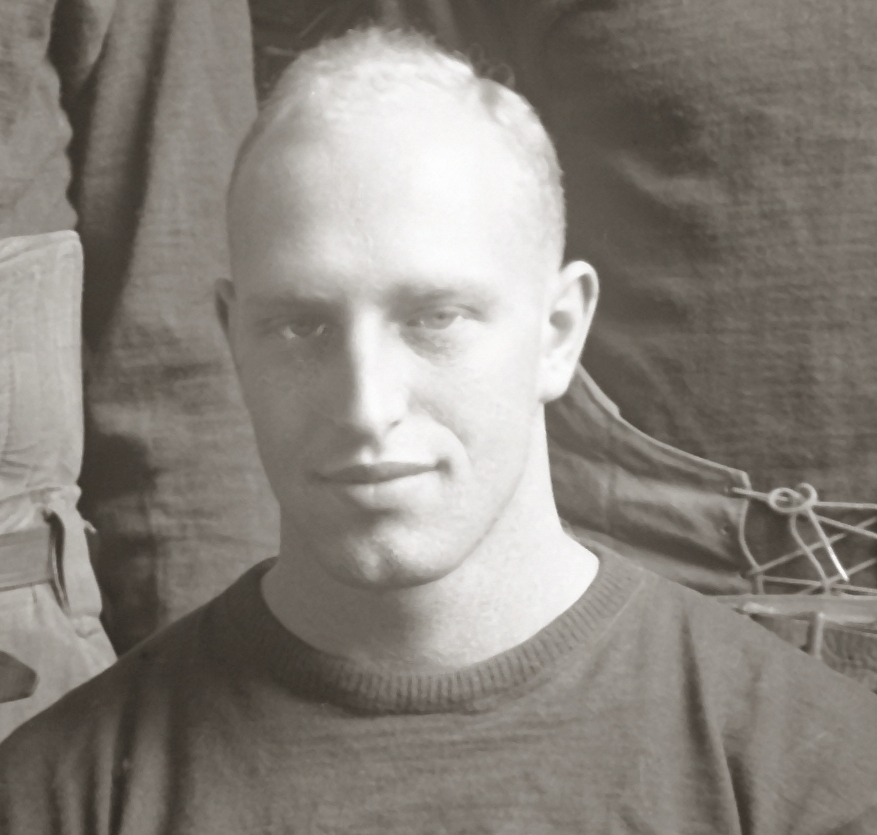
- Cappon cropped from 1921 Michigan football team photograph

Biographical details
- Born: October 17, 1900; Holland, Michigan, U.S.
- Died: November 29, 1961 (aged 61); Princeton, New Jersey, U.S.

Playing career

Football
- 1918: Phillips
- 1920–1922: Michigan

Basketball
- 1920–1922: Michigan
- Positions: End, fullback, halfback, tackle (football); Guard (basketball)

Coaching career (HC unless noted)

Football
- 1923–1924: Luther (IA)
- 1925: Michigan (ends/backs)
- 1926–1927: Kansas
- 1928–1937: Michigan (assistant)
- 1938–?: Princeton (assistant)

Basketball
- 1928–1931: Michigan (assistant)
- 1931–1938: Michigan
- 1938–1943: Princeton
- 1946–1961: Princeton

Administrative career (AD unless noted)
- 1924–1925: Luther (IA)

Head coaching record
- Overall: 13–14–2 (football); 340–242 (basketball)

Franklin C. "Cappy" Cappon (October 17, 1900 – November 29, 1961) was an American college football and college basketball player and coach. He played football and basketball at Phillips University and the University of Michigan and coached at Luther College (1923–1924), the University of Kansas (1926–1927), the University of Michigan (1925, 1928–1938), and Princeton University (1938–1961).

The son of a wealthy leather manufacturer in Holland, Michigan, Cappon was a star athlete in both basketball and football, and was named to All-Western football teams in 1920, 1921, and 1922. Before accepting a position at Princeton, Cappon was an assistant athletic director and basketball coach at Michigan from 1928 to 1938. In 23 years at Princeton, Cappon won five Ivy League championships, and his trademark "five-man weave" offense became closely identified with the program. He was a mentor at Princeton to a generation of student-athletes, including Butch van Breda Kolff, Bill Bradley and Frank Deford. Cappon died at age 61 of a heart attack in the showers at Princeton's Dillon Gymnasium after a basketball practice session.

== Youth in Holland, Michigan ==
Cappon was born and raised in Holland, Michigan. Cappon was the son of Mr. and Mrs. Isaac Cappon. His parents were both born in the Netherlands. His father, Isaac Cappon, came to Holland at age 17 and opened a tannery business that became one of Holland's largest companies, the Cappon-Bertsch Leather Co. His father was a leading citizen of the area and became Holland's first mayor, serving four terms. Cappon and his four sisters were raised in the family's stately house at 228 West 9th Street in Holland, built by Isaac Cappon in 1873 and considered one of the most beautiful homes in old Holland.

Cappon was an excellent all-around athlete at Holland High School. He played four years of varsity football and basketball and was all-state in both sports. In 1916, Cappon was the fullback on the Holland team that defeated rival Grand Haven 83–0. Holland gained 755 yards of offense in the game, and Cappon alone gained 364 yards. As a senior, Cappon led the 1917 Holland High School team to a series of extraordinary wins, beating Fennville (127–0), Kalamazoo High (60–0), Grand Haven (81–0), Benton Harbor (90–0), Grand Rapids Union (32–3), Traverse City (20–7) and Western State Normal (104–9), but losing to Grand Rapids Central (20–0).

Cappon later spoke about his early memories of oyster stew banquets, players shoveling snow off the football field and then marking it out, "dinky basketball floors" and their individual hazards, and the first state basketball tournament in 1916 when 40 teams entered a "free for all." Almost a half century after he graduated, the Holland Evening Sentinel called Cappon "Holland's most legendary high school athlete."

== College athlete ==
=== Phillips University ===
In 1917, former University of Michigan All-American John Maulbetsch married Cappon's sister and became the football coach at Phillips University in Enid, Oklahoma. When Cappon graduated from high school in 1918, he was persuaded to join his brother-in-law at Phillips. Maulbetsch recruited other top athletes to Phillips, including future International Olympic Committee leader Doug Roby and future Pro Football Hall of Famer Steve Owen, and turned Phillips briefly into one of the country's top football programs. Maulbetsch's team was undefeated in 1918 and lost only one game in 1919.

=== University of Michigan ===
After one or two years at Phillips, Cappon returned to his home state and enrolled at the University of Michigan. Cappon became a star athlete in both football and basketball at Michigan. He played seven games at left end for the 1920 Michigan football team, and was named to Walter Eckersall's All-Western team at the end of the 1920 season. In 1921, Cappon played four games at left tackle, one game at left halfback, and two at right halfback. In recognition of his versatility on the line and in the backfield, one expert placed Cappon on his 1921 All-Western team as a tackle, and another named him as a second-team All-Western halfback. In 1922, Cappon moved to fullback where he started all seven games for the undefeated Michigan team. He was named a second-team All-Western fullback, and Walter Eckersall named Cappon as "general utility man" for his All-Western team. One writer said of Cappon's performance in 1922: "He's the boy who was given the ball whenever the team needed two or three yards, and he always got it." Grand Rapids mayor, and former Cappon teammate, Paul G. Goebel, called Cappon "the greatest football player I've seen in 35 years." Goebel added: "If Cappy hadn't played all the positions he'd a been an All-American in one or two of them."

Cappon also starred as a guard on the Michigan basketball team in 1921 and 1922. As a senior, Cappon was awarded the Western Conference Medal, an honorary award from the conference for all-around excellence in both athletics and academics.

== College coach ==
=== Luther ===
In the fall of 1923, Cappon became the football coach for Luther College in Decorah, Iowa. After the football season, he returned to Michigan for the spring semester and received his degree in 1924. He returned to Luther College in the fall of 1924 as the athletic director in charge of all sports. In Cappon's two seasons as the football coach, the Luther teams had a record of 8–4–3.

=== Assistant to Fielding H. Yost ===
In February 1925, Cappon was hired by Fielding H. Yost to return to Michigan as part of the school's football coaching staff. Cappon was charged with coaching the ends and backs, a group that included All-Americans Bennie Oosterbaan, Benny Friedman and Bo Molenda. Yost later called the 1925 Michigan squad the greatest team he ever coached. While at Michigan in 1925 and 1926, Cappon was also an instructor in Michigan's coaching school and assisted Michigan basketball coach E. J. Mather.

=== Kansas ===
Cappon, circa 1926

In January 1926, the University of Kansas announced that it had hired Cappon as its new football coach. Former Michigan football coach George Little, then at Wisconsin, recommended Cappon to the administrators at Kansas. Little said he had tried to take Cappon with him to Wisconsin and called Cappon "one of the most promising coaches of recent graduation in the United States." On his first visit to Lawrence, Kansas, Cappon told reporters: "I always have heard of the clean, fine sportsmanship in the Missouri Valley conference, and I am glad to be coming out this way. ... I hope we may turn out a football team that will be a credit to the Valley and in every way uphold Valley traditions for clean play and sportsmanship." In two seasons as the football coach at Kansas, Cappon's record was 5–10–1. According to a 1940 history of football at the University of Kansas, Cappon resigned after two years at Kansas as the result of a controversy over "scouting." The Missouri Valley conference schools had agreed "not to 'scout' each other in the belief that such a practice was unsportsmanlike." After Kansas beat Missouri 14–7 with a new passing attack and "impregnable defense," Missouri produced evidence to show that Kansas supporters, not part of the Kansas staff, had acted as "volunteer scouts" at Missouri games and had provided Cappon with "charts of the Tiger plays," that enabled Cappon to develop new schemes to stop the Missouri offense. According to the 1940 account, the "upshot of the affair was Cappon's resignation."

=== Michigan basketball coach and assistant athletic director ===
In 1928, Cappon returned to the University of Michigan as an assistant football and basketball coach. He also served as the assistant athletic director, and in 1931 accepted the additional responsibility as head coach of the basketball team. At the time, one columnist noted: "The Wolves have an excellent man on the campus right now in the person of Franklin 'Baldy' Cappon, assistant athletic director. 'Cappy' has scouted Big Ten basketball for the past few years, and has had something of the personnel and plays of the Michigan five." From 1931 to 1938, he was the head basketball coach and assistant athletic director at Michigan. Cappon's record in seven years as Michigan's head basketball coach was 78–57. After the basketball team went 14–26 in two seasons from 1933 to 1935, Cappon turned the program around. His best seasons at Michigan were from 1935 to 1937, when the Wolverines were 31–9 over the course of two seasons. His top players in his best years at Michigan included brothers Earl and John Townsend from Indianapolis.

In February 1938, the University of Michigan hired Fritz Crisler from Princeton to replace Harry Kipke as football coach and Cappon as assistant athletic director. Although no formal announcement was made, appointment of Crisler as assistant athletic director "aroused some speculation as to the status of Franklin C. Cappon," and it was reported that the tenure of Cappon as assistant athletic director had come to an end. The following month, Cappon accepted a position with Princeton as its head basketball coach and assistant football coach under Princeton's head coach Tad Wieman.

=== Princeton basketball coach ===
In 1938, Cappon was hired by Princeton University as its head basketball coach. With the exception of three years serving in the Navy during World War II, Cappon remained as Princeton's head basketball coach for the next 23 years until he died in the showers at Princeton's basketball field house. Cappon won five Ivy League basketball titles while at Princeton, and compiled a record of 262–185. His best seasons at Princeton were 1941–42 (16–5), 1942–43 (14–6), 1950–51 (15–7), 1957–58 (15–8), and 1958–59 (19–5). In the 1960–61 season, during which Cappon suffered his first heart attack, the team was 9–2 in games Cappon coached. One of the great players coached by Cappon was Butch van Breda Kolff, who succeeded Cappon as Princeton's coach in 1962. While at Princeton, he was also an assistant football coach responsible at various times for the backs, the line, and the ends.

In January 1943, Cappon tendered his resignation as coach at Princeton in order to accept a commission with the U.S. Navy. He was assigned to St. Mary's Pre-Flight School in Moraga, California. Cappon missed the 1943–1944 through 1945–1946 basketball seasons while serving in the Navy. Cappon was a lieutenant in the Naval Aviation fitness program, where he wrote training texts and directed athletics for the fleet airwing on the West Coast. After returning to Princeton, Cappon was outspoken on the value of athletics as an equalizer in American society. In a 1952 speech, Cappon said: "There are some basic principles that we're gradually losing sight of in America, but we still have them in athletics. When you come out for an athletic team, your race, creed or color makes no difference. Nobody asks you who you know or how much money you've got. The athletic field is one place where the merit system still takes precedence over the seniority system."

At Princeton, Cappon became known for two trademarks. The first was the "Iron Five," his practice of picking the five best players and playing them without substitution in every game. The second was the "five-man weave" offense. Cappon once joked about the Iron Five tradition, saying, "If you start five men, they should be your best men, and if they're in shape, and play the way they should, there should be no need to substitute." After a pause, Cappon then added, "but more important than all that, I haven't got anybody worth a damn on the bench." Cappon did not believe in recruiting, and Princeton did not offer athletic scholarships. Accordingly, Cappon worked with whatever talent showed up. One former Princeton player later wrote: "It was short, white basketball at its best. Cappy's teams and best players were tough, gritty, aggressive, and smart."

Cappon's Princeton teams ran his trademark five-man weave offense from his arrival in the 1930s until he died in 1961. The scheme kept all five players "in constant motion, running from one corner of the floor to the other, along the arc of what now is the three-point line." While operating in Cappon's weave, players dribbled with their outside hand, and passed to the approaching player, who ran outside the passer to receive the ball. The players had to be in great physical condition, because they were constantly on the move and were "expected to run the other guys into the ground."

Cappon was known for his conservatism as a coach. In 23 years at Princeton, the uniforms never changed, having small sewn-on numbers and no player names. He considered a fast break as a lack of discipline and would not allow his players to shoot before five or ten passes had been completed. In 1995, former Princeton player Selden Edwards wrote an article on Cappon's influence at Princeton. Edwards, a junior varsity player in the Cappon era, wrote that "Cappy was Princeton basketball to anyone even vaguely familiar with the teams of that era." Edwards described Cappon's physical appearance this way:

"In 1959, the fall I arrived at Princeton, Cappy was in peak form, a character who knew he was a character. He was in his early sixties, and his body looked as if it had been sculpted in ice cream and left in the sun. He was bald, the skin on his face drooped, he had deep shadows under his eyes. His voice was gravelly, and he enunciated as if he had wads of Kleenex in his mouth. He always said exactly what he meant, and his language was delightfully salty. Legend had it that he had been a great athlete at Michigan, but by the 1960s no one could imagine that. He was grumpily personable and totally without pretension."

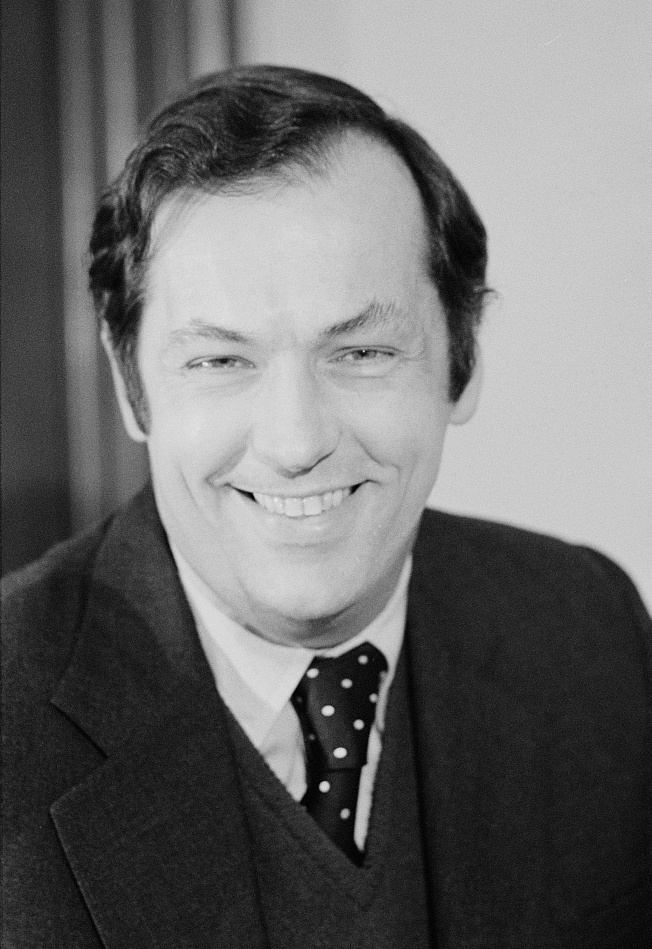
Bill Bradley called Cappon one of the two men who drew him to Princeton.

Another famous Princeton alum who played for Cappon is Sports Illustrated writer Frank Deford. Deford played on Princeton's practice squad while covering the varsity team for the campus newspaper. Cappon once set Deford straight about his talents, telling him, "Deford, you write basketball better than you play it." Deford later wrote the following about Cappon:

"In a profession in which men are renowned for their behavior during a basketball game, Cappy Cappon stood quite by himself among coaches. Until the game was over, the man never did anything but frown. There were degrees of frowning, of course, but his gamut of expression seldom ventured too far from that of a basic frown. A mournful frown, a disinterested frown, and if it was possible – and it was – a frown of satisfaction. . . . And when something happened that there wasn't a frown to express completely, Cappy would cup his hands or rise to his feet and bellow the words: `What'rya doin' out there?' When the game was over, the frown would stay quite in place if Princeton lost. But if they won, he would finally smile just a bit, a smile that looked both modest and embarrassed."

In 1957, Cappon was inducted into the Helms Foundation College Basketball Hall of Fame. In 1960, Cappon was part of the committee that selected the U.S. basketball team to compete in the 1960 Summer Olympics. He was also a past president of the National Basketball Coaches Association.

== Family and death ==
Cappon married Henrietta Van Putten of Holland, Michigan, and they had their first child, Franklin C. Cappon Jr., in 1925. They also had a daughter, Mary L. Cappon.

In January 1961, Cappon suffered a mild heart attack, and he was hospitalized again for two weeks in the summer of 1961 with an occlusion in an artery of his left arm. Cappon returned to work at Princeton despite the stress that coaching would put on his heart. On November 29, 1961, Cappon suffered a second heart attack while showering after a basketball practice at Princeton's Dillon Gymnasium. Junior varsity coach, Edward J. Donovan, was in the shower with Cappon at the time, saw Cappon falling and lowered him to the ground. Donovan called for help, and when Cappon's doctor arrived ten minutes later, he found Cappon dead on the floor.

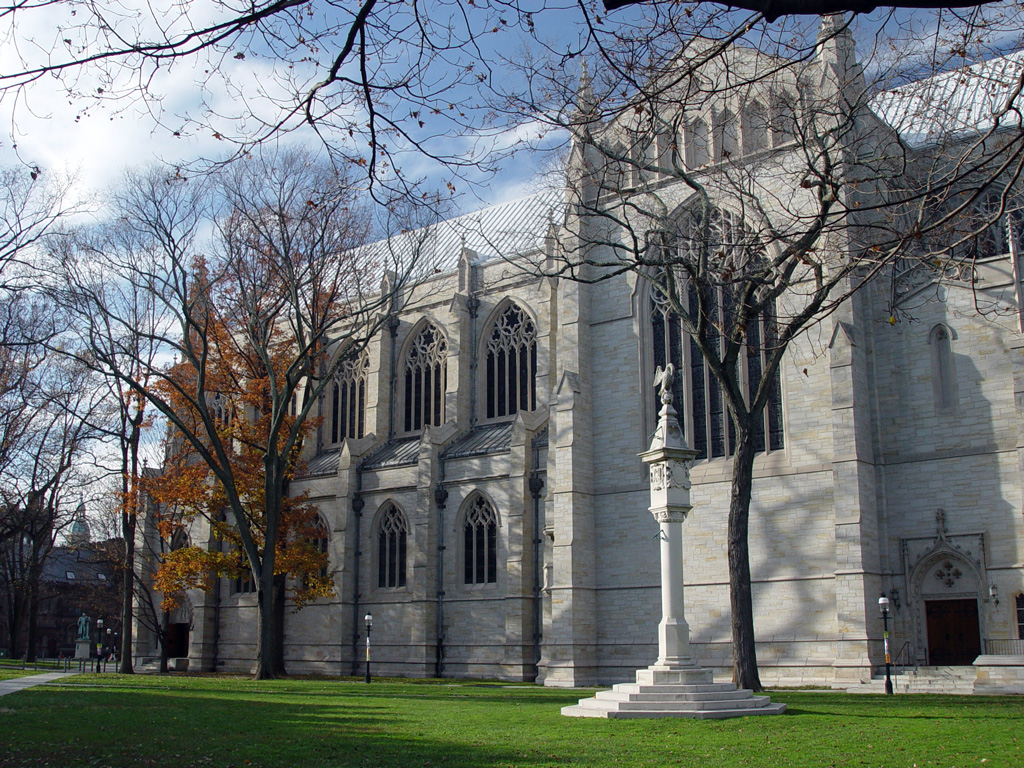
Princeton University Chapel where Cappon's funeral was held

As word of Cappon's death spread around the Princeton campus, it became "one of the saddest days in the lives of anyone connected with Princeton sports in those years," a moment which some compared to the day two years later when President John F. Kennedy was assassinated. Future U.S. Senator Bill Bradley was a freshman basketball player at the time. One of his teammates found Bradley sitting alone at the Princeton Student Center eating a pint of ice cream after learning of Cappon's death. With a dazed look of grief, Bradley noted, "The two people who brought me here are gone," referring to Cappon and Princeton's director of admissions who had recently retired. In his profile of Cappon, Selden Edwards noted that he'd "never been able to get that image from my mind, of the two naked old men on the tile floor, Silent Ed cradling Cappy Cappon in his arms. Something out of Michelangelo."

Cappon's funeral was held at Princeton University Chapel.

== Head coaching record ==
=== Football ===
Year	Team	Overall	Conference	Standing	Bowl/playoffs
Luther Norse (Iowa Conference) (1923–1924)
1923	Luther	4–1–2			
1924	Luther	4–3–1	0–1–1	T–13th	
Luther:		8–4–3			
Kansas Jayhawks (Missouri Valley Conference) (1926–1927)
1926	Kansas	2–6	1–5	9th	
1927	Kansas	3–4–1	3–3–1	T–5th	
Kansas:		5–10–1	4–8–1		
Total:		13–14–2			

=== Basketball ===
Record table
Season	Team	Overall	Conference	Standing	Postseason
Michigan Wolverines (Big Ten Conference) (1931–1938)
1931–32	Michigan	11–6	8–4	4th	
1932–33	Michigan	10–8	8–4	T–3rd	
1933–34	Michigan	6–14	4–8	T–8th	
1934–35	Michigan	8–12	2–10	9th	
1935–36	Michigan	15–5	7–5	T–3rd	
1936–37	Michigan	16–4	9–3	T–3rd	
1937–38	Michigan	12–8	6–6	T–5th	
Michigan:		78–57 (.578)	44–40 (.524)		
Princeton Tigers (Eastern Intercollegiate Basketball League) (1938–1943)
1938–39	Princeton	10–9	6–6	T–4th	
1939–40	Princeton	14–8	8–4	2nd	
1940–41	Princeton	10–13	4–8	T–4th	
1941–42	Princeton	16–5	10–2	T–1st	
1942–43	Princeton	14–6	9–3	2nd	
Princeton Tigers (Eastern Intercollegiate Basketball League) (1946–1955)
1946–47	Princeton	7–16	2–10	7th	
1947–48	Princeton	12–11	6–6	T–3rd	
1948–49	Princeton	13–9	8–4	T–2nd	
1949–50	Princeton	14–9	11–1	1st	
1950–51	Princeton	15–7	5–7	4th	
1951–52	Princeton	16–11	10–2	1st	NCAA first round
1952–53	Princeton	9–14	5–7	T–5th	
1953–54	Princeton	16–9	11–3	2nd	
1954–55	Princeton	13–12	10–4	T–1st	NCAA Sweet Sixteen
Princeton Tigers (Ivy League) (1955–1961)
1955–56	Princeton	11–13	7–7	T–5th	
1956–57	Princeton	14–9	9–5	T–3rd	
1957–58	Princeton	15–8	9–5	T–2nd	
1958–59	Princeton	19–5	13–1	T–1st	
1959–60	Princeton	15–9	11–3	1st	NCAA University Division First Round
1960–61	Princeton	9–2	4–0	1st	NCAA University Division Sweet Sixteen
Princeton:		262–185 (.586)	153–88 (.635)		
Total:		340–242 (.584)			
National champion Postseason invitational champion Conference regular season champion Conference regular season and conference tournament champion Division regular season champion Division regular season and conference tournament champion Conference tournament champion
