= 1968–69 Yale Bulldogs men's basketball team =

American college basketball season

1968–69 Yale Bulldogs men's basketball
- Conference: Ivy League
- Record: 9–16 (6–8 Ivy)
- Head coach: Joe Vancisin (13th season)
- Home arena: John J. Lee Amphitheater

The 1968–69 Yale Bulldogs men's basketball team represented Yale University during the 1968–69 men's college basketball season. The Bulldogs, led by 13th year head coach Joe Vancisin, played their home games at John J. Lee Amphitheater of the Payne Whitney Gymnasium and were members of the Ivy League. They finished the season 9–16, 6–8 in Ivy League play to finish in fifth place.

== Schedule ==
| Date time, TV | Rank^{#} | Opponent^{#} | Result | Record | Site city, state |
|---|---|---|---|---|---|
| November 30* | | Connecticut | W 89–70 | 1–0 | Payne Whitney Gymnasium; New Haven, CT |
| December 3* | | at Fordham | L 85–98 | 1–1 | Rose Hill Gymnasium; The Bronx, New York |
| December 7* | | Holy Cross | L 66–67 | 1–2 | Payne Whitney Gymnasium; New Haven, CT |
| December 11 | | Brown | W 63–59 | 2–2 (1—0) | Payne Whitney Gymnasium; New Haven, CT |
| December 14* | | Colgate | W 88–63 | 3–2 (1—0) | Payne Whitney Gymnasium; New Haven, CT |
| December 18 | | at Brown | W 91–62 | 4–2 (2—0) | Marvel Gymnasium; Providence, RI |
| December 20* | | vs. Miami (FL) | L 71–77 | 4–3 (2—0) | Memorial Field House; Huntington, WV |
| December 21* | | at Marshall | L 72–77 | 4–4 (2—0) | Memorial Field House; Huntington, WV |
| December 23* | | at SMU | L 76–88 | 4–5 (2—0) | Moody Coliseum; University Park, Texas |
| December 26* | | vs. Oregon | L 71–84 | 4–6 (2—0) | |
| December 28* | | vs. California | L 59–66 | 4–7 (2—0) | |
| December 30* | | vs. Syracuse | W 83–65 | 5–7 (2—0) | |
| January 3* | | at Nevada | L 84–87 | 5–8 (2—0) | Virginia Street Gymnasium |
| January 10 | | Columbia | L 49–71 | 5–9 (2—1) | Payne Whitney Gymnasium; New Haven, CT |
| January 11 | | Cornell | W 73–59 | 6–9 (3—1) | Payne Whitney Gymnasium; New Haven, CT |
| January 31 | | at Cornell | L 64–65 | 6–10 (3—2) | Barton Hall; Ithaca, NY |
| February 1 | | at Columbia | L 48–69 | 6–11 (3—3) | University Heights Gymnasium; New York City |
| February 7 | | at Harvard | W 76–70 | 7–11 (4—3) | Malkin Athletic Center; Cambridge, Massachusetts |
| February 8 | | at Dartmouth | W 54–51 | 8–11 (5—3) | Alumni Gymnasium; Hanover, NH |
| February 14 | | Princeton | L 56–67 | 8–12 (5—4) | Payne Whitney Gymnasium; New Haven, CT |
| February 15 | | Penn | L 60–67 | 8–13 (5—5) | Payne Whitney Gymnasium; New Haven, CT |
| February 21 | | at Princeton | L 53–72 | 8–14 (5—6) | Dillon Gymnasium; Princeton, NJ |
| February 22 | | at Penn | L 74–82 | 8–15 (5—7) | Palestra; Philadelphia, Pennsylvania |
| February 28 | | Dartmouth | L 62–74 | 8–16 (5—8) | Payne Whitney Gymnasium; New Haven, CT |
| March 1 | | Harvard | W 84–69 | 9–16 (6—8) | Payne Whitney Gymnasium; New Haven, CT |
*Non-conference game. ^{#}Rankings from AP Poll. (#) Tournament seedings in parentheses.
