= 1963–64 Princeton Tigers men's basketball team =

American college basketball season

1963–64 Princeton Tigers men's basketball
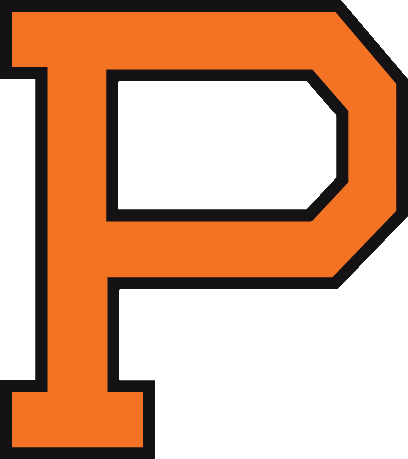

Ivy League Champions

1964 NCAA Division I men's basketball tournament, Regional 4th place
- Conference: Ivy League
- Record: 20–9 (12–2, 1st Ivy)
- Head coach: Butch van Breda Kolff
- Captain: William Howard
- Home arena: Dillon Gymnasium

The 1963–64 Princeton Tigers men's basketball team represented Princeton University in intercollegiate college basketball during the 1963–64 NCAA University Division men's basketball season. Butch van Breda Kolff served as head coach and the team captain was William Howard. The team played its home games in the Dillon Gymnasium in Princeton, New Jersey. The team was the champion of the Ivy League, earning an invitation to the 25-team 1964 NCAA Division I men's basketball tournament.

The team posted a 20–9 overall record and a 12–2 conference record. The team won its NCAA Division I men's basketball tournament East region first round contest against the VMI Keydets by an 86–60 margin at The Palestra on March 9, 1963, before losing in the second round at the Reynolds Coliseum in Raleigh, North Carolina, to the Connecticut Huskies 52–50 on March 13. Then, the next night at the Coliseum in the consolation game, they lost to the Villanova Wildcats 74–62.

Bill Bradley, who for the second of three consecutive seasons led the conference in scoring with a 33.1 points per game average in conference games, was a first team All-Ivy League selection. In addition, Bradley was a consensus first team 1964 NCAA Men's Basketball All-American selection by numerous panels: First team (Associated Press, United Press International, National Association of Basketball Coaches, United States Basketball Writers Association, Sporting News, Converse, NEA, Helms Foundation). Bradley also won a gold medal at the 1960 Summer Olympics. Bradley joined Arthur Loeb (1921–22 and 1922–23) and Cyril Haas (1915–16 and 1916–17) as the school's only two-time All-Americans. Bill Bradley would repeat as a consensus first-team selection and become the school's only three-time men's basketball All-American selection the following year. Bradley established the current Ivy League single-season scoring records of 936 points and 32.3 points per game overall and 464 and 33.1 average in conference games, surpassing Chet Forte's 1957 totals. Bradley also repeated as the conference leader in rebounding with a 13.0 average and led the conference in field goal percentage with a 52.5%.
