= Butch van Breda Kolff =

American basketball player and coach (1922–2007)

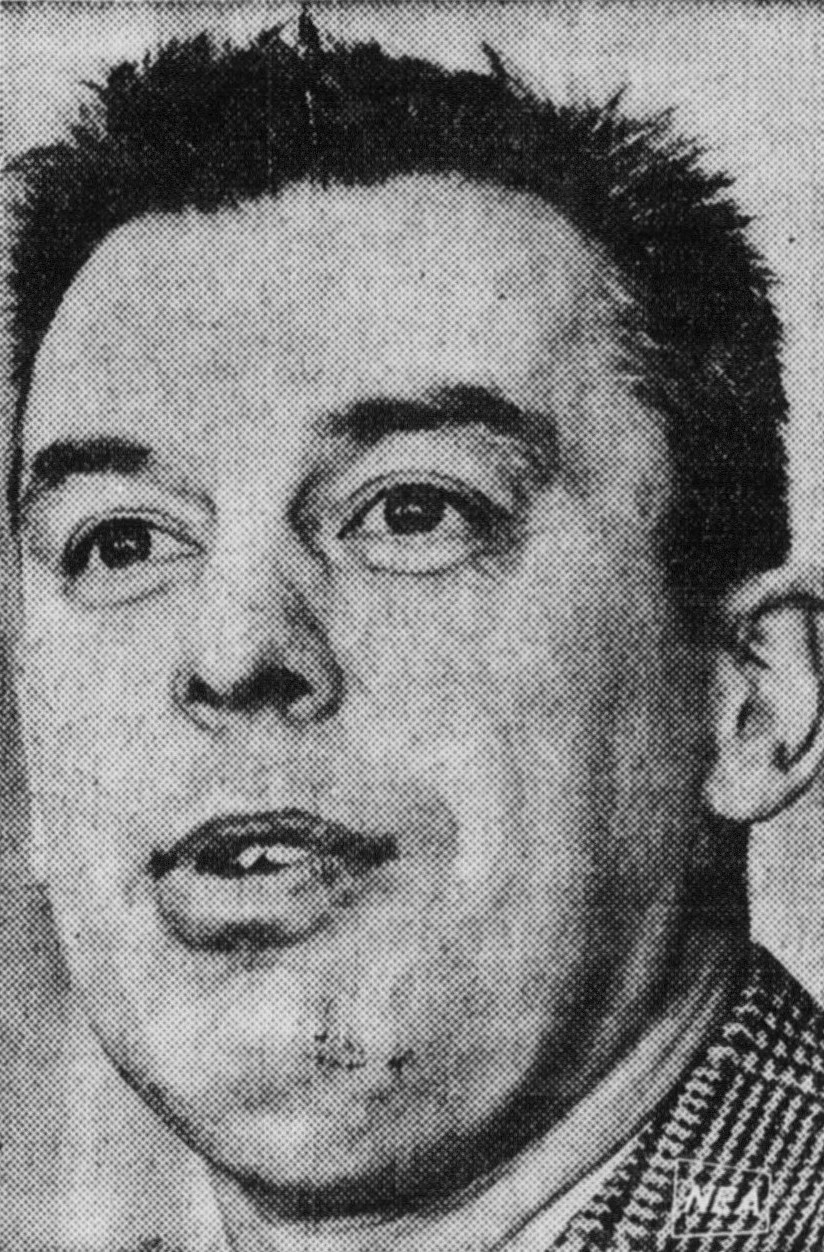
- Van Breda Kolff, circa 1968

Personal information
- Born: October 28, 1922 Glen Ridge, New Jersey, U.S.
- Died: August 22, 2007 (aged 84) Spokane, Washington, U.S.
- Listed height: 6 ft 3 in (1.91 m)
- Listed weight: 185 lb (84 kg)

Career information
- High school: The Hill School (Pottstown, Pennsylvania)
- College: Princeton (1942–1946)
- Playing career: 1946–1950
- Position: Shooting guard / small forward
- Number: 11, 17
- Coaching career: 1951–1994

Career history

Playing
- 1946–1950: New York Knicks

Career highlights
- As coach: NCAA Division I Regional – Final Four (1965); Middle Three regular season (1952); 4× Ivy League regular season champion (1963–1965, 1967); Sun Belt tournament champion (1978); ECC regular season champion (1988); ECC tournament champion (1994)
- Stats at NBA.com
- Stats at Basketball Reference

Career coaching record
- College: 482–272 (.639)
- NBA: 287–316 (.476)
- WBL: 39–28 (.582)
- Record at Basketball Reference

Willem Hendrik "Butch" (sometimes "Bill") van Breda Kolff (October 28, 1922 – August 22, 2007) was an American basketball player and coach. He played four seasons for the New York Knicks before becoming a head coach at Lafayette. Ultimately, he coached for eleven different teams in five classifications (NCAA, NBA, ABA, Women's Professional Basketball League, United States Basketball League). He reached the NCAA Final Four and two NBA Finals while winning a championship in four different conferences.

== Biography ==
=== Early life and career ===
Butch was born in Glen Ridge, New Jersey, son of Dutch soccer player Jan van Breda Kolff. He gained an affection for basketball while growing up in Montclair. He attended The Hill School in Pottstown, Pennsylvania. He then attended Princeton University, where he played basketball for Franklin "Cappy" Cappon, and New York University, where he also played basketball. He also played one season for the Princeton soccer team in 1946 as a midfielder, and was included in the NSCAA All-America first team.

Signed by the New York Knicks in 1946, he spent four seasons playing as a professional. The New York Knicks played in the Basketball Association of America (BAA), which merged with some of the better teams of the National Basketball League to form the National Basketball Association in (NBA) in 1949. In the four years (1946–50) van Breda Kolff played in the BAA and the NBA, he turned in a relatively unimpressive performance, shooting just .305 from the field, .669 from the line, and averaging 4.7 points in 175 contests. He was elected team captain of the Knicks.

After leaving the NBA in 1950, van Breda Kolff began a coaching career. He took over as head coach at Lafayette College, where he remained from 1951 to 1955. He also coached soccer and lacrosse at Lafayette. He then coached for Hofstra University from 1955 to 1962, and Princeton from 1962 to 1967. He is one of four men to have coached both an NCAA final Four team (Princeton, 1965) and an NBA Finals squad (the Los Angeles Lakers, 1968 and 1969). (The others are Larry Brown, Jack Ramsay, and Fred Schaus.)

Van Breda Kolff also spent time running a women's professional team and later coached a high school team in Picayune, Mississippi, where he taught world history after passing the National Teacher Examination. "Coaching is coaching", he once told a reporter. "Give me 10 players who want to work and learn the game and I'm happy. I don't count the house."

=== Pro coaching career ===
Van Breda Kolff's success in college attracted the attention of the NBA. The Lakers hired him in 1967, and in his first season guided the team to the NBA Finals, where they lost to the Boston Celtics in six games. In his second campaign for the Lakers, his team — with Elgin Baylor, Jerry West, and Wilt Chamberlain — notched a 55–27 record and reached the Finals again, albeit with a slow start that saw Chamberlain and van Breda Kolff bicker, right down to having local newspapers take sides (the coach had the Times while Chamberlain had the Herald-Examiner); Chamberlain later called him the worst coach he ever had.

Van Breda Kolff took tremendous flak for not allowing Chamberlain back in the game for the final minutes of Game 7 of the NBA Finals against Boston. Chamberlain picked up his fifth foul midway through the fourth quarter, and shortly thereafter asked out of the game with knee pain. With backup center Mel Counts in the game, the Lakers cut a seven-point deficit to two points. Chamberlain then motioned to van Breda Kolff that he was ready to go back in the game, to which van Breda Kolff told him "sit your big ass down" and "we don't need you." The Lakers lost by two points. On May 19, van Breda Kolff resigned before he could be fired by Lakers owner Jack Kent Cooke. Game 7 marked the last time he would coach an NBA team in a postseason game.

Van Breda Kolff then went on to Detroit, where he coached the Pistons for just over two seasons. In 1970–71, he guided the team to a 45–37 mark, Detroit's first winning season in fifteen years. He left the team ten games into the next season, stating in a 1984 Sports Illustrated article that he quit after being cursed at repeatedly by frustrated fans. Van Breda Kolff coached the Phoenix Suns for the first seven games of the 1972–73 campaign before being fired and replaced by Jerry Colangelo. He did a stint with Memphis of the American Basketball Association in 1973–74. From 1974 to 1977, van Breda Kolff coached the New Orleans Jazz, taking over in the middle of the 1974–75 season and departing with a 14–12 record part way through the 1976–77 season.

While van Breda Kolff was coach, he pushed for New Orleans to relinquish the rights to Moses Malone in exchange for a #1 draft pick, and then traded that pick and two other #1s to the Lakers for Gail Goodrich. Malone would later become a superstar but Goodrich suffered an Achilles' tendon injury that would end his career in 1979. The Jazz' #1 pick in 1979 (the first overall choice) was used by the Lakers to select Magic Johnson. Breda Kolff left the NBA ranks for good in 1976, taking with him a career NBA coaching record of 266–253 and a .513 winning percentage. That also marked the year van Breda Kolff's son Jan entered the NBA, with the New York Nets; he coached one game against his son's team.

While in New Orleans, van Breda Kolff also coached the New Orleans Pride in the Women's Professional Basketball League (WBL) from 1979 to 1981.

In 1996, van Breda Kolff coached the Tampa Bay Windjammers for the first six games of the 1996 United States Basketball League (USBL) season.

=== Coaching style ===
Van Breda Kolff often clashed with other strong egos. After leaving the Jazz, he remained in New Orleans and returned to the college coaching ranks with the University of New Orleans, where he spent two years. He worked as a tugboat salesman in 1982. In 1985, Lafayette, the team he had coached 30 years earlier, asked him to return. Van Breda Kolff stayed four seasons at Lafayette before leaving to coach Hofstra once again. His second stint with the Flying Dutchmen lasted five seasons and ended after the 1993–94 season, which saw Hofstra win just nine games but also saw them go on a winning streak in the East Coast Conference tournament all the way to the final, which they won in what was Van Breda Kolff's final game as a head coach. In 28 years as a college coach, he compiled a 482–272 record.

He waa inducted into the Hofstra Athletics Hall of Fame in 2008.

=== Death and legacy ===
Van Breda Kolff died August 22, 2007, at a nursing home in Spokane, Washington, after a long illness.

"All I know is life isn't much different than that game on the court", he said in an article in the New York Daily News in the early 1980s. "If it's run right — with precision, with good, honest effort — it's a thing of beauty. I know what it looks like and that's what keeps me going."

His son Jan van Breda Kolff was also a basketball player and coach.

== BAA/NBA career statistics ==
Legend
GP	Games played	FG%	Field-goal percentage
FT%	Free-throw percentage	APG	Assists per game
PPG	Points per game	**Bold**	Career high

=== Regular season ===
Year	Team	GP	FG%	FT%	APG	PPG
1946–47	New York	16	.206	.647	.4	1.6
1947–48	New York	44	.276	.617	.7	4.1
1948–49	New York	**59**	.317	.671	**2.4**	**7.0**
1949–50	New York	56	**.329**	**.716**	1.4	3.7
Career		175	.305	.669	1.5	4.7

=== Playoffs ===
Year	Team	GP	FG%	FT%	APG	PPG
1947	New York	5	.219	.538	.8	4.2
1948	New York	3	**.375**	.714	.7	7.3
1949	New York	**6**	**.375**	**.826**	**1.2**	**8.2**
1950	New York	1	.000	.000	.0	.0
Career		15	.318	.720	.9	6.1

== Head coaching record ==
=== College basketball ===
Record table
Season	Team	Overall	Conference	Standing	Postseason
**Lafayette Leopards** (Middle Three Conference) (1951–1955)
1951–52	Lafayette	15–9		1st	
1952–53	Lafayette	13–12			
1953–54	Lafayette	17–10			
1954–55	Lafayette	23–3			NIT First Round
**Hofstra Flying Dutchmen** (Middle Atlantic Conference) (1955–1962)
1955–56	Hofstra	22–4			NCAA College Division Regional Runner-up
1956–57	Hofstra	11–15			
1957–58	Hofstra	15–8			
1958–59	Hofstra	20–7			
1959–60	Hofstra	23–1			
1960–61	Hofstra	21–4			
1961–62	Hofstra	24–4			NCAA College Division Regional Runner-up
**Princeton Tigers** (Ivy League) (1962–1967)
1962–63	Princeton	19–6	11–3	T–1st	NCAA University Division First Round
1963–64	Princeton	20–9	12–2	1st	NCAA University Division Regional Fourth Place
1964–65	Princeton	23–6	13–1	1st	NCAA University Division Third Place
1965–66	Princeton	16–7	9–5	4th	
1966–67	Princeton	25–3	13–1	1st	NCAA University Division Regional Third Place
Princeton:		103–31	58–12		
**New Orleans Privateers** (Sun Belt Conference) (1977–1979)
1977–78	New Orleans	21–6	8–2	2nd	
1978–79	New Orleans	11–16	3–7	5th	
New Orleans:		32–22	11–9		
**Lafayette Leopards** (East Coast Conference) (1984–1988)
1984–85	Lafayette	15–13			
1985–86	Lafayette	14–15			
1986–87	Lafayette	16–13			
1987–88	Lafayette	19–10		1st	
Lafayette:		132–85			
**Hofstra Flying Dutchmen** (East Coast Conference) (1988–1994)
1988–89	Hofstra	14–15			
1989–90	Hofstra	13–15			
1990–91	Hofstra	14–14			
1991–92	Hofstra	20–9			
1992–93	Hofstra	9–18			
1993–94	Hofstra	9–20			
Hofstra:		215–134			
Total:		482–272			
National champion Postseason invitational champion Conference regular season champion Conference regular season and conference tournament champion Division regular season champion Division regular season and conference tournament champion Conference tournament champion

=== NBA/ABA ===
Legend
Regular season	G	Games coached	W	Games won	L	Games lost	W–L %	Win–loss %
Playoffs	PG	Playoff games	PW	Playoff wins	PL	Playoff losses	PW–L %	Playoff win–loss %

Team	Year	G	W	L	W–L%	Finish	PG	PW	PL	PW–L%	Result
Los Angeles	1967–68	82	52	30	.634	2nd in Western	15	10	5	.667	Lost in NBA Finals
Los Angeles	1968–69	82	55	27	.671	1st in Western	18	11	7	.611	Lost in NBA Finals
Detroit	1969–70	82	31	51	.378	7th in Eastern	–	–	–	–	Missed Playoffs
Detroit	1970–71	82	45	37	.549	4th in Midwest	–	–	–	–	Missed Playoffs
Detroit	1971–72	10	6	4	.600	(resigned)	–	–	–	–	–
Phoenix	1972–73	7	3	4	.429	(fired)	–	–	–	–	–
Memphis (ABA)	1973–74	84	21	63	.250	4th in Eastern	–	–	–	–	Missed Playoffs
New Orleans	1974–75	66	22	44	.333	5th in Central	–	–	–	–	Missed Playoffs
New Orleans	1975–76	82	38	44	.463	4th in Central	–	–	–	–	Missed Playoffs
New Orleans	1976–77	26	14	12	.538	(fired)	–	–	–	–	–
**Career**		603	287	316	.476		33	21	12	.636	

== See also ==
- List of NCAA Division I Men's Final Four appearances by coach
