= 1987–88 Cornell Big Red men's basketball team =

American college basketball season

1987–88 Cornell Big Red men's basketball

Ivy League champions

NCAA tournament
- Conference: Ivy League
- Record: 17–10 (11—3 Ivy)
- Head coach: Mike Dement (2nd season)
- Assistant coaches: Al Walker; Steve Robinson; George Dorfman
- Home arena: Barton Hall

1987–88 Ivy League men's basketball standings
	Conf.				Overall
Team	W		L	PCT	W		L	PCT
Cornell	11	–	3	.786	17	–	10	.630
Dartmouth	10	–	4	.714	18	–	8	.692
Princeton	9	–	5	.643	17	–	9	.654
Yale	8	–	6	.571	12	–	14	.462
Penn	8	–	6	.571	10	–	16	.385
Harvard	6	–	8	.429	11	–	15	.423
Brown	2	–	12	.143	6	–	20	.231
Columbia	2	–	12	.143	6	–	20	.231
Rankings from AP Poll

The 1987–88 Cornell Big Red men's basketball team represented Cornell University during the 1987–88 college men's basketball season. This was coach Mike Dement's second season at Cornell. The team finished with a final record of 17–10 (11—3 Ivy League) and they won the Ivy League to receive the conference's automatic bid to the NCAA tournament. Playing as the No. 16 seed in the West region, the Big Red were beaten by No. 1 seed and eventual Final Four participant Arizona, 90–50.

== Roster ==
1987–88 Cornell Big Red men's basketball team
Players
Coaches

Pos.	#	Name	Height	Weight	Year	Hometown
G	10	Monte Boykin	6 ft 1 in (1.85 m)	165 lb (75 kg)	So	Woburn, Massachusetts
G	12	Jon Halpern	6 ft 2 in (1.88 m)	175 lb (79 kg)	So	Merrick, New York
G	20	Len Breslow	6 ft 0 in (1.83 m)	175 lb (79 kg)	Sr	Dix Hills, New York
G	21	Steve Johnson	6 ft 0 in (1.83 m)	177 lb (80 kg)	Fr	Pine Ridge, Kentucky
F	23	Mike Millane	6 ft 7 in (2.01 m)	230 lb (104 kg)	Sr	Doylestown, Pennsylvania
G	24	Patrick Homer	6 ft 4 in (1.93 m)	200 lb (91 kg)	Jr	Lovington, New Mexico
F	30	Dean Kartsonas	6 ft 5 in (1.96 m)	205 lb (93 kg)	Sr	Pittsburgh, Pennsylvania
F	31	Bernard Jackson	6 ft 9 in (2.06 m)	245 lb (111 kg)	Fr	Scarborough, Ontario, Canada
G	33	Steve George	6 ft 4 in (1.93 m)	175 lb (79 kg)	Fr	Kent, Ohio
F	34	Paul McRae	6 ft 9 in (2.06 m)	235 lb (107 kg)	Fr	St. Petersburg, Florida
G	40	Sam Jacobs	6 ft 1 in (1.85 m)	175 lb (79 kg)	Sr	Cherry Hill, New Jersey
F	42	Nate Grant	6 ft 7 in (2.01 m)	220 lb (100 kg)	Fr	Homewood, Illinois
F	44	Wolfgang Florin	6 ft 6 in (1.98 m)	220 lb (100 kg)	Sr	Fort Wayne, Indiana
F	45	Mike Pascal	6 ft 5 in (1.96 m)	195 lb (88 kg)	Jr	Lorton, Virginia
G	50	Josh Wexler	6 ft 1 in (1.85 m)	168 lb (76 kg)	Jr	Highland Park, Illinois
C	52	Greg Gilda	6 ft 8 in (2.03 m)	210 lb (95 kg)	Sr	Bellingham, Washington
F	53	James Paul	6 ft 5 in (1.96 m)	220 lb (100 kg)	Sr	Washington, D.C.
F	54	Jamal Oliver	6 ft 7 in (2.01 m)	195 lb (88 kg)	Fr	The Bronx, New York

Head coach

- Mike Dement

Assistant coach(es)

- Al Walker
- Steve Robinson
- George Dorfman

Legend

- (C) Team captain
- (S) Suspended
- (I) Ineligible
- (W) Walk-on
- Injured
- Current redshirt

Roster

== Schedule and results ==
Date time, TV	Rank^{#}	Opponent^{#}	Result	Record	Site city, state
Regular Season
Nov 29, 1987*		Castleton State	W 81–53	1–0	Barton Hall; Ithaca, New York
Dec 2, 1987*		at Canisius	W 94–89	2–0	Koessler Athletic Center; Buffalo, New York
Dec 7, 1987*		at No. 8 Syracuse	L 59–95	2–1	Carrier Dome; Syracuse, New York
Dec 12, 1987*		St. Bonaventure	W 61–57	3–1	Barton Hall; Ithaca, New York
Dec 28, 1987*		vs. Miami (OH); Music City Classic	W 77–71	4–1	Memorial Gymnasium; Nashville, Tennessee
Dec 29, 1987*		at Vanderbilt; Music City Classic	L 79–95	4–2	Memorial Gymnasium; Nashville, Tennessee
Jan 3, 1988*		at NC State	L 72–95	4–3	Reynolds Coliseum; Raleigh, North Carolina
Jan 5, 1988*		Army	W 72–65	5–3	Barton Hall; Ithaca, New York
Jan 9, 1988*		at Drexel	L 83–87	5–4	Daskalakis Athletic Center; Philadelphia, Pennsylvania
Jan 11, 1988*		at Bucknell	L 93–99	5–5	Davis Gym; Lewisburg, Pennsylvania
Jan 15, 1988		Dartmouth	L 83–97	5–6 (0–1)	Barton Hall; Ithaca, New York
Jan 16, 1988		Harvard	W 75–50	6–6 (1–1)	Barton Hall; Ithaca, New York
Jan 19, 1988*		at Lafayette	L 43–84	6–7	Kirby Sports Center; Easton, Pennsylvania
Jan 23, 1988		Columbia	W 73–60	7–7 (2–1)	Barton Hall; Ithaca, New York
Jan 25, 1988*		Colgate	W 80–48	8–7	Barton Hall; Ithaca, New York
Jan 30, 1988		at Columbia	W 68–46	9–7 (3–1)	Levien Gymnasium; New York, New York
Feb 5, 1988		Princeton	W 60–55	10–7 (4–1)	Barton Hall (2,500); Ithaca, New York
Feb 6, 1988		Pennsylvania	W 79–68	11–7 (5–1)	Barton Hall; Ithaca, New York
Feb 12, 1988		at Brown	W 86–78	12–7 (6–1)	Marvel Gymnasium; Providence, Rhode Island
Feb 13, 1988		at Yale	W 68–62	13–7 (7–1)	Payne Whitney Gymnasium (900); New Haven, Connecticut
Feb 19, 1988		at Harvard	W 71–63	14–7 (8–1)	Lavietes Pavilion; Boston, Massachusetts
Feb 20, 1988		at Dartmouth	W 101–85	15–7 (9–1)	Leede Arena; Hanover, New Hampshire
Feb 26, 1988		Yale	W 94–83	16–7 (10–1)	Barton Hall (4,000); Ithaca, New York
Feb 27, 1988		Brown	W 94–84	17–7 (11–1)	Barton Hall; Ithaca, New York
Mar 4, 1988		at Pennsylvania	L 79–85	17–8 (11–2)	Palestra; Philadelphia, Pennsylvania
Mar 5, 1988		at Princeton	L 58–79	17–9 (11–3)	Jadwin Gymnasium; Princeton, New Jersey
1988 NCAA tournament
Mar 18, 1988*	(16 W)	vs. (1 W) No. 2 Arizona; First Round	L 50–90	17–10	Pauley Pavilion; Los Angeles, California
*Non-conference game. ^{#}Rankings from AP Poll. (#) Tournament seedings in parentheses. W=West. All times are in Eastern Time.
