= 1986–87 Notre Dame Fighting Irish men's basketball team =

American college basketball season

1986–87 Notre Dame Fighting Irish men's basketball

NCAA tournament, Sweet Sixteen
- Conference: Independent

Ranking
- Coaches: No. 18
- AP: No. 18
- Record: 24–8
- Head coach: Digger Phelps (16th season)
- Home arena: Joyce Center

1986–87 NCAA Division I men's basketball independents standings
| | Conf. | | | | Overall |
| Team | W | | L | PCT | W | | L | PCT |
|---|---|---|---|---|---|---|---|---|
| No. 5 DePaul | - | – | - | – | 28 | – | 3 | .903 |
| No. 16 New Orleans | - | – | - | – | 26 | – | 4 | .867 |
| No. 18 Notre Dame | - | – | - | – | 24 | – | 8 | .750 |
| Texas–Pan American | - | – | - | – | 16 | – | 12 | .571 |
| Tennessee State | - | – | - | – | 15 | – | 12 | .556 |
| Marquette | - | – | - | – | 16 | – | 13 | .552 |
| Miami (FL) | - | – | - | – | 15 | – | 16 | .484 |
| Dayton | - | – | - | – | 13 | – | 15 | .464 |
| Central Florida | - | – | - | – | 12 | – | 15 | .444 |
| UMBC | - | – | - | – | 12 | – | 15 | .444 |
| Chicago State | - | – | - | – | 11 | – | 17 | .393 |
| Southwestern Louisiana | - | – | - | – | 11 | – | 17 | .393 |
| U.S. International | - | – | - | – | 11 | – | 17 | .393 |
| Utica | - | – | - | – | 10 | – | 16 | .385 |
| Brooklyn | - | – | - | – | 10 | – | 18 | .357 |
| Northern Illinois | - | – | - | – | 9 | – | 19 | .321 |
| Central Connecticut State | - | – | - | – | 8 | – | 21 | .276 |
| Eastern Washington | - | – | - | – | 5 | – | 23 | .179 |
Rankings from AP Poll

The 1986–87 Notre Dame Fighting Irish men's basketball team represented the University of Notre Dame during the 1986-87 college basketball season. The Irish were led by head coach Digger Phelps, in his 16th season, and played their home games at the Joyce Center in Notre Dame, Indiana. Notre Dame earned an at-large bid to the NCAA tournament where they reached the Sweet Sixteen. The team finished with a 24–8 record and a No. 18 rankings in both major polls.

== Roster ==
1986–87 Notre Dame Fighting Irish men's basketball team
Players
Coaches

| Pos. | # | Name | Height | Weight | Year | Hometown |
|---|---|---|---|---|---|---|
| G | 4 | David Rivers | 6 ft 2 in (1.88 m) | 170 lb (77 kg) | Jr | Jersey City, New Jersey |
| F | 15 | Donald Royal | 6 ft 8 in (2.03 m) | 205 lb (93 kg) | Sr | New Orleans, Louisiana |

Head coach

- Digger Phelps (Rider)

Assistant coach(es)

Legend

- (C) Team captain
- (S) Suspended
- (I) Ineligible
- (W) Walk-on
- Injured
- Current redshirt

== Schedule and results ==
| Date time, TV | Rank^{#} | Opponent^{#} | Result | Record | Site city, state |
Regular season
| Nov 21, 1986* | | Western Kentucky; Preseason NIT | L 63–80 | 0–1 | Joyce Center; Notre Dame, Indiana |
| Dec 2, 1986* | | No. 3 Indiana | L 62–67 | 0–2 | Joyce Center; Notre Dame, Indiana |
| Dec 4, 1986* | | Cornell | W 60–56 | 1–2 | Joyce Center; Notre Dame, Indiana |
| Dec 6, 1986* | | Brigham Young | W 62–46 | 2–2 | Joyce Center; Notre Dame, Indiana |
| Dec 11, 1986* | | Eastern Michigan | W 81–76 | 3–2 | Joyce Center; Notre Dame, Indiana |
| Dec 20, 1986* | | Valparaiso | W 63–50 | 4–2 | Joyce Center; Notre Dame, Indiana |
| Dec 29, 1986* | | Central Michigan | W 55–54 | 5–2 | Joyce Center; Notre Dame, Indiana |
| Dec 31, 1986* | | at Maryland | W 63–50 | 6–2 | Cole Fieldhouse; College Park, Maryland |
| Jan 3, 1987* | | at Pennsylvania | W 71–67 | 7–2 | Palestra; Philadelphia, Pennsylvania |
| Jan 4, 1987* | | at Yale | W 64–49 | 8–2 | New Haven Coliseum (3,423); New Haven, Connecticut |
| Jan 10, 1987* | | at No. 7 DePaul | L 54–58 | 8–3 | Rosemont Horizon; Rosemont, Illinois |
| Jan 12, 1987* | | at Creighton | W 67–54 | 9–3 | Omaha Civic Auditorium; Omaha, Nebraska |
| Jan 17, 1987* | | West Virginia | L 55–57 | 9–4 | Joyce Center; Notre Dame, Indiana |
| Jan 24, 1987* | | at UCLA | L 59–63 | 9–5 | Pauley Pavilion; Los Angeles, California |
| Jan 27, 1987* | | Dayton | W 66–55 | 10–5 | Joyce Center; Notre Dame, Indiana |
| Jan 29, 1987* | | Marquette | W 58–48 | 11–5 | Joyce Center; Notre Dame, Indiana |
| Feb 1, 1987* | | No. 1 North Carolina | W 60–58 | 12–5 | Joyce Center; Notre Dame, Indiana |
| Feb 4, 1987* | | La Salle | W 76–64 | 13–5 | Joyce Center; Notre Dame, Indiana |
| Feb 6, 1987* | | at Vanderbilt | L 56–60 | 13–6 | Memorial Gymnasium; Nashville, Tennessee |
| Feb 8, 1987* | | at No. 18 Kansas | L 60–70 | 13–7 | Allen Fieldhouse; Lawrence, Kansas |
| Feb 15, 1987* | | No. 15 Duke | W 70–66 ^{OT} | 14–7 | Joyce Center; Notre Dame, Indiana |
| Feb 16, 1987* | | Wagner | W 74–54 | 15–7 | Joyce Center; Notre Dame, Indiana |
| Feb 18, 1987* | | vs. Fordham | W 69–57 | 16–7 | |
| Feb 21, 1987* | | at Utah | W 57–56 | 17–7 | Jon M. Huntsman Center; Salt Lake City, Utah |
| Feb 25, 1987* | | No. 4 DePaul | W 73–62 | 18–7 | Joyce Center; Notre Dame, Indiana |
| Feb 28, 1987* | | at Marquette | W 72–60 | 19–7 | MECCA Arena; Milwaukee, Wisconsin |
| Mar 3, 1987* | No. 20 | Brooklyn | W 76–57 | 20–7 | Joyce Center; Notre Dame, Indiana |
| Mar 5, 1987* | No. 20 | Miami (FL) | W 65–49 | 21–7 | Joyce Center; Notre Dame, Indiana |
| Mar 7, 1987* | No. 20 | at Dayton | W 62–56 | 22–7 | University of Dayton Arena; Dayton, Ohio |
NCAA Tournament
| Mar 12, 1987* | (5 E) No. 18 | vs. (12 E) Middle Tennessee; First round | W 84–71 | 23–7 | Charlotte Coliseum; Charlotte, North Carolina |
| Mar 14, 1987* | (5 E) No. 18 | vs. (4 E) No. 19 TCU; Second round | W 58–57 | 24–7 | Charlotte Coliseum; Charlotte, North Carolina |
| Mar 19, 1987* | (5 E) No. 18 | vs. (1 E) No. 2 North Carolina; East Regional semifinal – Sweet Sixteen | L 68–74 | 24–8 | Brendan Byrne Arena; East Rutherford, New Jersey |
*Non-conference game. ^{#}Rankings from AP Poll/UPI Poll. (#) Tournament seedings in parentheses. E=East. All times are in Eastern Time.
