= 1958–59 Princeton Tigers men's basketball team =

American college basketball season

1958–59 Princeton Tigers men's basketball
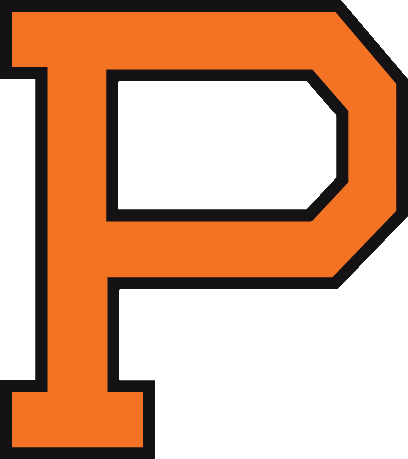

Ivy League Co-Champions

Ivy League one-game playoff, Lost
- Conference: Ivy League
- Record: 19–5 (13–2, 1st-t Ivy)
- Head coach: Franklin Cappon
- Captain: Carl Belz
- Home arena: Dillon Gymnasium

The 1958–59 Princeton Tigers men's basketball team represented Princeton University in intercollegiate college basketball during the 1958–59 NCAA University Division men's basketball season. The head coach was Franklin Cappon and the team captain was Carl Belz. The team played its home games in the Dillon Gymnasium in Princeton, New Jersey. The team was the Co-Champion of the Ivy League, ending the regular season tied with Dartmouth Big Green with a 13–1 record at the end of the regular conference schedule.

Following a 4–3 start the team won twelve consecutive games on its way to posting a 19–5 overall record and a 13–2 conference record. After ending the regular season tied for the conference lead, the team lost a one-game playoff against Dartmouth on March 7, 1959, at the Payne Whitney Gymnasium in New Haven, Connecticut, by a 69–68 margin for the Ivy League championship and the automatic invitation to the 1959 NCAA Men's Division I Basketball Tournament.

Belz established the current school single-game rebounding record on January 31, 1959, against the Rutgers Scarlett Knights when he totaled 29. This surpassed the previous record of 27 set on February 1, 1956, against Rutgers and tied on March 3, 1956, against the Cornell Big Red, both by David "Whitey" Fulcomer.

Belz, who finished second to Cornell's Lou Jordan in the conference in scoring with a 20.1 points per game average, and Jim Brangan were both first team All-Ivy League selections, and Belz was drafted by the Minneapolis Lakers in the 9th Round of the 1959 NBA draft with the 62nd overall selection. Belz led the conference in field goal percentage with a 56.8%.
