= 1968–69 Princeton Tigers men's basketball team =

American college basketball season

1968–69 Princeton Tigers men's basketball

Undefeated Ivy League Champion

1969 NCAA Division I men's basketball tournament, Regional Quarterfinals
- Conference: Ivy League
- Record: 19–7 (14–0, 1st Ivy)
- Head coach: Pete Carril
- Captain: Christopher Thomforde
- Home arena: Dillon Gymnasium; Jadwin Gymnasium

1968–69 Ivy League men's basketball standings
	Conf.				Overall
Team	W		L	PCT	W		L	PCT
Princeton	14	–	0	1.000	19	–	7	.731
Columbia	11	–	3	.786	20	–	4	.833
Penn	10	–	4	.714	15	–	10	.600
Cornell	7	–	7	.500	12	–	13	.480
Yale	6	–	8	.429	9	–	16	.360
Dartmouth	4	–	10	.286	10	–	15	.400
Harvard	3	–	11	.214	7	–	18	.280
Brown	1	–	13	.071	3	–	23	.115
Rankings from AP Poll

The 1968–69 Princeton Tigers men's basketball team represented the Princeton University in intercollegiate college basketball during the 1968–69 NCAA University Division men's basketball season. The head coach was Pete Carril and the team captain was Christopher Thomforde. The team played its home games in the Dillon Gymnasium on the university campus before the January 25, 1969, opening of Jadwin Gymnasium on the university campus in Princeton, New Jersey. The team was the champion of the Ivy League, which earned them an invitation to the 25-team 1969 NCAA Division I men's basketball tournament. The team was Princeton's first undefeated Ivy League champion, and earned Carril his first of eleven NCAA Division I men's basketball tournament invitations. The team helped Princeton end the decade with a 72.6 winning percentage (188–71), which was the tenth best in the nation.

During the regular season, the team played a few of the teams that would eventually participate in the 25-team NCAA tournament: they opened their season against the Villanova Wildcats and later played two of the eventual final four participants (the UCLA Bruins and North Carolina Tar Heels) in the ECAC Holiday Classic at Madison Square Garden in New York City in late December 1968. The team posted a 19–7 overall record and a 14–0 conference record. The team entered the tournament riding an eleven-game winning streak and having won fifteen of their last sixteen games, but they lost their March 8, 1969 NCAA Division I men's basketball tournament East Regional first-round game against the St. John's Redmen 72–63 at Reynolds Coliseum in Raleigh, North Carolina.

Both John Hummer and Geoff Petrie were selected to the All-Ivy League first team. Petrie, who led the conference in scoring with a 23.9 average in conference games, was also an All-East selection. Thomforde was selected in the 1969 NBA draft by the New York Knicks with the 96th overall selection in the 7th round. Hummer led the conference in field goal percentage with 55.4%. Petrie and Hummer would become the only Tiger teammates to both be drafted in the first round of the NBA draft (in the same draft no less) when they were selected eighth and fifteenth overall in the 1970 NBA draft by the Portland Trail Blazers and the Buffalo Braves. The two were part of a trio of 1970 NBA first-round draftees from the Ivy League that included number thirteen selection Jim McMillian of Columbia. Hummer was the first NBA draft pick by the expansion Buffalo Braves. Petrie would share the 1971 NBA Rookie of the Year Award with Dave Cowens. Brian Taylor was selected in the 1972 NBA draft by the Seattle SuperSonics with the 23rd overall selection in the second round while Reggie Bird was selected by the Atlanta Hawks with the 55th overall selection in the fourth round.

== Schedule and results ==
The team posted a 19–7 (14–0 Ivy League) record.

Date time, TV	Rank^{#}	Opponent^{#}	Result	Record	Site city, state
Regular season
Dec 3, 1968*		at No. 10 Villanova	L 54–64	0–1	Villanova Field House; Philadelphia, Pennsylvania
Dec 7, 1968*		vs. No. 16 Duke	L 62–81	0–2	Madison Square Garden; New York, New York
Dec 11, 1968*		at Maryland	W 72–63	1–2	Cole Fieldhouse; College Park, Maryland
Dec 14, 1968*		Navy	W 56–55	2–2	Dillon Gym; Princeton, New Jersey
Dec 17, 1968*		at Rutgers	L 60–61	2–3	College Avenue Gymnasium; Piscataway, New Jersey
Dec 18, 1968*		NYU	W 88–76	3–3	Dillon Gym; Princeton, New Jersey
Dec 27, 1968*		vs. Holy Cross; ECAC Holiday Festival	W 67–55	4–3	Madison Square Garden; New York, New York
Dec 28, 1968*		vs. No. 1 UCLA; ECAC Holiday Festival	L 67–83	4–4	Madison Square Garden; New York, New York
Dec 30, 1968*		vs. No. 4 North Carolina; ECAC Holiday Festival	L 76–103	4–5	Madison Square Garden; New York, New York
Jan 3, 1969		at Penn	W 59–56	5–5 (1–0)	The Palestra; Philadelphia, Pennsylvania
Jan 4, 1969*		at Army	W 51–42	6–5	Gillis Field House; West Point, New York
Jan 10, 1969		Dartmouth	W 70–55	7–5 (2–0)	Dillon Gym; Princeton, New Jersey
Jan 11, 1969		Harvard	W 73–62	8–5 (3–0)	Dillon Gym; Princeton, New Jersey
Jan 23, 1969*		at No. 4 Davidson	L 54–71	8–6	Charlotte Coliseum; Charlotte, North Carolina
Jan 25, 1969		Penn	W 74–62	9–6 (4–0)	Dillon Gym; Princeton, New Jersey
Jan 31, 1969		at Harvard	W 76–65	10–6 (5–0)	Lavietes Pavilion; Cambridge, Massachusetts
Feb 1, 1969		at Dartmouth	W 61–50	11–6 (6–0)	Alumni Gym; Hanover, New Hampshire
Feb 7, 1969		No. 14 Columbia	W 68–49	12–6 (7–0)	Dillon Gym; Princeton, New Jersey
Feb 8, 1969		Cornell	W 67–57	13–6 (8–0)	Dillon Gym; Princeton, New Jersey
Feb 14, 1969		at Yale	W 67–56	14–6 (9–0)	John J. Lee Amphitheater; New Haven, Connecticut
Feb 15, 1969		at Brown	W 75–56	15–6 (10–0)	Marvel Gymnasium; Providence, Rhode Island
Feb 21, 1969		Yale	W 72–53	16–6 (11–0)	Dillon Gym; Princeton, New Jersey
Feb 22, 1969		Brown	W 74–46	17–6 (12–0)	Dillon Gym; Princeton, New Jersey
Feb 28, 1969		at Columbia	W 60–59	18–6 (13–0)	University Gymnasium; New York, New York
Mar 1, 1969		at Cornell	W 74–64	19–6 (14–0)	Barton Hall; Ithaca, New York
NCAA tournament
Mar 8, 1969*		vs. No. 8 St. John's; First round	L 63–72	19–7	Reynolds Coliseum; Raleigh, North Carolina
*Non-conference game. ^{#}Rankings from AP Poll. (#) Tournament seedings in parentheses.

== NCAA tournament ==
The team lost in the first round of the 1969 NCAA Division I men's basketball tournament.

3/8/69 in Raleigh, N.C.: St. John’s 72, Princeton 63

== Awards and honors ==
- Geoff Petrie
  - First Team All-Ivy League
  - Ivy League Scoring Champion
  - All-East
- John Hummer
  - First Team All-Ivy League
- Chris Thomforde
  - Second Team All-Ivy League
  - NCAA Postgraduate Scholar

== Players drafted into the NBA ==
Five players from this team were selected in the NBA draft.

Year	Round	Pick	Player	NBA Club
1969	7	11	Chris Thomforde	New York Knicks
1970	1	8	Geoff Petrie	Portland Trail Blazers
1970	1	15	John Hummer	Buffalo Braves
1972	2	23	Brian Taylor	Seattle SuperSonics
1972	4	55	Reggie Bird	Atlanta Hawks
