= 1987–88 Yale Bulldogs men's basketball team =

American college basketball season

1987–88 Yale Bulldogs men's basketball
- Conference: Ivy League
- Record: 12–14 (8–6 Ivy)
- Head coach: Dick Kuchen (2nd season)
- Assistant coaches: Mike Mucci; Tim O'Shea
- Captain: Paul Maley
- Home arena: John J. Lee Amphitheater

1987–88 Ivy League men's basketball standings
	Conf.				Overall
Team	W		L	PCT	W		L	PCT
Cornell	11	–	3	.786	17	–	10	.630
Dartmouth	10	–	4	.714	18	–	8	.692
Princeton	9	–	5	.643	17	–	9	.654
Yale	8	–	6	.571	12	–	14	.462
Penn	8	–	6	.571	10	–	16	.385
Harvard	6	–	8	.429	11	–	15	.423
Brown	2	–	12	.143	6	–	20	.231
Columbia	2	–	12	.143	6	–	20	.231
Rankings from AP Poll

The 1987–88 Yale Bulldogs men's basketball team represented the Yale University during the 1987–88 NCAA Division I men's basketball season. The Bulldogs, led by 2nd year head coach Dick Kuchen, played their home games at John J. Lee Amphitheater of the Payne Whitney Gymnasium and were members of the Ivy League. They finished the season 12–14, 8–6 in Ivy League play to tied for fourth place.

== Roster ==
1987–88 Yale Bulldogs men's basketball team
Players
Coaches

Pos.	#	Name	Height	Weight	Year	Hometown
G	10	Val Carlotti	5 ft 10 in (1.78 m)	172 lb (78 kg)	Sr	Bronx, New York
G	11	John Brodsky	6 ft 0 in (1.83 m)	150 lb (68 kg)	Fr	Spokane, Washington
G	12	Peter White	5 ft 10 in (1.78 m)	150 lb (68 kg)	Sr	Williamsport, Pennsylvania
G	14	John Rice	6 ft 4 in (1.93 m)	187 lb (85 kg)	Sr	Washington, D.C.
F	15	Steve Keller	6 ft 6 in (1.98 m)	205 lb (93 kg)	Fr	Los Angeles, California
F	20	Travis McCready	6 ft 6 in (1.98 m)	210 lb (95 kg)	Fr	New York, New York
F/C	21	Eric Mitchell	6 ft 6 in (1.98 m)	209 lb (95 kg)	Sr	Chevy Chase, Maryland
F/C	22	Michael McMahon	6 ft 5 in (1.96 m)	217 lb (98 kg)	Jr	West Haven, Connecticut
G/F	24	Paul Maley	6 ft 7 in (2.01 m)	217 lb (98 kg)	Sr	Los Alamos, New Mexico
G/F	25	Dean Campbell	6 ft 4 in (1.93 m)	190 lb (86 kg)	Fr	Silver Spring, Maryland
G	33	Ben Bradshaw	6 ft 3 in (1.91 m)	185 lb (84 kg)	Fr	Orem, Utah
G	34	Matt Whitehead	6 ft 4 in (1.93 m)	190 lb (86 kg)	Sr	Stamford, Connecticut
G/F	35	John Culbertson	6 ft 7 in (2.01 m)	180 lb (82 kg)	Fr	Vienna, Virginia
F	40	Mike Ryan	6 ft 4 in (1.93 m)	188 lb (85 kg)	Jr	Staten Island, New York
C	42	Thad Vogler	6 ft 8 in (2.03 m)	230 lb (104 kg)	Fr	Olympia, Washington
F	45	Arthur Mann	6 ft 4 in (1.93 m)	205 lb (93 kg)	Jr	Lancaster, Pennsylvania
C	55	Steve Dove	6 ft 8 in (2.03 m)	215 lb (98 kg)	Fr	Decatur, Illinois

Head coach

- Dick Kuchen

Assistant coach(es)

- Mike Mucci
- Tim O'Shea

Legend

- (C) Team captain
- (S) Suspended
- (I) Ineligible
- (W) Walk-on
- Injured
- Current redshirt

Roster

== Schedule ==
Date time, TV	Rank^{#}	Opponent^{#}	Result	Record	Site (attendance) city, state
Non-conference regular season
Nov 28, 1987*		George Washington	L 65–77	0–1	Payne Whitney Gymnasium (744); New Haven, Connecticut
Dec 2, 1987*; WTXX		at Connecticut	L 59–69	0–2	Hugh S. Greer Field House (4,044); Storrs, Connecticut
Dec 5, 1987*		vs. Lafayette; Seton Hall Tournament	L 56–70	0–3	(2,422)
Dec 6, 1987*		vs. Wagner; Seton Hall Tournament	W 78–69	1–3	(2,000)
Dec 9, 1987*		Holy Cross	L 81–100	1–4	Payne Whitney Gymnasium (520); New Haven, Connecticut
Dec 29, 1987*		at Chattanooga; Coca-Cola Classic	L 54–72	1–5	UTC Arena (4,712); Chattanooga, Tennessee
Dec 30, 1987*		vs. Penn State; Coca-Cola Classic	L 50–69	1–6	UTC Arena (500); Chattanooga, Tennessee
Jan 4, 1988*		at New Hampshire	W 71–69	2–6	Lundholm Gym (225); Durham, New Hampshire
Jan 7, 1988*		Manhattan	W 89–81 ^{2OT}	3–6	Payne Whitney Gymnasium (200); New Haven, Connecticut
Jan 9, 1988*		Fairfield	L 47–53	3–7	Payne Whitney Gymnasium (1,184); New Haven, Connecticut
Jan 13, 1988*		at Notre Dame	L 59–85	3–8	Joyce Center (10,487); Notre Dame, Indiana
Ivy League regular season
Jan 16, 1988		Brown	W 82–75	4–8 (1–0)	Payne Whitney Gymnasium (1,025); New Haven, Connecticut
Jan 21, 1988*		Army	W 98–67	5–8	Payne Whitney Gymnasium (305); New Haven, Connecticut
Jan 23, 1988		at Brown	W 87–77	6–8 (2–0)	Marvel Gymnasium (705); Providence, Rhode Island
Jan 29, 1988		at Penn	L 76–87	6–9 (2–1)	Palestra (3,487); Philadelphia, Pennsylvania
Jan 30, 1988		at Princeton	L 46–52	6–10 (2–2)	Jadwin Gymnasium (2,135); Princeton, New Jersey
Feb 5, 1988		at Dartmouth	L 66–83	6–11 (2–3)	Leede Arena (2,100); Hanover, New Hampshire
Feb 6, 1988		at Harvard	L 68–89	6–12 (2–4)	Lavietes Pavilion (1,800); Boston, Massachusetts
Feb 12, 1988		Columbia	W 59–56	7–12 (3–4)	Payne Whitney Gymnasium (400); New Haven, Connecticut
Feb 13, 1988		Cornell	L 62–68	7–13 (3–5)	Payne Whitney Gymnasium (900); New Haven, Connecticut
Feb 19, 1988		Princeton	W 61–60	8–13 (4–5)	Payne Whitney Gymnasium (1,230); New Haven, Connecticut
Feb 20, 1988		Penn	W 87–81	9–13 (5–5)	Payne Whitney Gymnasium (1,157); New Haven, Connecticut
Feb 26, 1988		at Cornell	L 83–94	9–14 (5–6)	Barton Hall (4,000); Ithaca, New York
Feb 27, 1988		at Columbia	W 78–67	10–14 (6–6)	Levien Gymnasium (1,180); New York, New York
Mar 4, 1988		Harvard	W 73–69	11–14 (7–6)	Payne Whitney Gymnasium (1,189); New Haven, Connecticut
Mar 5, 1988		Dartmouth	W 79–78	12–14 (8–6)	Payne Whitney Gymnasium (1,216); New Haven, Connecticut
*Non-conference game. ^{#}Rankings from AP Poll. (#) Tournament seedings in parentheses. All times are in Eastern Time.
