= 1986–87 Penn Quakers men's basketball team =

American college basketball season

1986–87 Penn Quakers men's basketball

Ivy League champions

NCAA tournament, First Round
- Conference: Ivy League
- Record: 13–14 (10–4 Ivy)
- Head coach: Tom Schneider (2nd season)
- Home arena: The Palestra

1986–87 Ivy League men's basketball standings
	Conf.				Overall
Team	W		L	PCT	W		L	PCT
Penn	10	–	4	.714	13	–	14	.481
Princeton	9	–	5	.643	16	–	9	.640
Cornell	9	–	5	.643	15	–	11	.577
Dartmouth	7	–	7	.500	15	–	11	.577
Yale	7	–	7	.500	14	–	12	.538
Columbia	6	–	8	.429	12	–	14	.462
Harvard	4	–	10	.286	9	–	17	.346
Brown	4	–	10	.286	9	–	18	.333
Rankings from AP Poll

The 1986–87 Penn Quakers men's basketball team represented the University of Pennsylvania during the 1986–87 NCAA Division I men's basketball season. The Quakers, led by 2nd-year head coach Tom Schneider, played their home games at The Palestra as members of the Ivy League. They finished the season 13–14, 10–4 in Ivy League play to win the conference championship. They received the Ivy League's automatic bid to the NCAA tournament where they lost in the First Round to No. 1 seed North Carolina.

== Roster ==
1986–87 Penn Quakers men's basketball team
Players
Coaches

Pos.	#	Name	Height	Weight	Year	Previous school	Hometown
G	4	Perry Bromwell (C)	6 ft 2 in (1.88 m)	—	Sr	Manhattan
F/C	24	Bruce Lefkowitz (C)	6 ft 8 in (2.03 m)	—	Sr		Scarsdale, New York

Head coach

- Tom Schneider

Assistant coach(es)

Legend

- (C) Team captain
- (S) Suspended
- (I) Ineligible
- (W) Walk-on
- Injured
- Current redshirt

Roster

== Schedule and results ==
Date time, TV	Rank^{#}	Opponent^{#}	Result	Record	Site (attendance) city, state
Non-conference regular season
Dec 1, 1986*		at No. 15 Georgia Tech	L 57–84	0–1	Alexander Memorial Coliseum; Atlanta, Georgia
Dec 6, 1986*		Niagara	L 74–79	0–2	The Palestra; Philadelphia, Pennsylvania
Dec 8, 1986*		at Temple	L 67–103	0–3	McGonigle Hall; Philadelphia, Pennsylvania
Dec 13, 1986*		Vanderbilt	L 70–71	0–4	The Palestra; Philadelphia, Pennsylvania
Dec 29, 1986*		vs. Alabama; BMA Holiday Classic	L 68–110	0–5	Kemper Arena; Kansas City, Missouri
Dec 30, 1986*		vs. Oral Roberts; BMA Holiday Classic	W 71–63	1–5	Kemper Arena; Kansas City, Missouri
Jan 3, 1987*		Notre Dame	L 67–71	1–6	The Palestra; Philadelphia, Pennsylvania
Ivy League regular season
Jan 9, 1987		at Harvard	L 91–93	1–7 (0–1)	Lavietes Pavilion; Cambridge, Massachusetts
Jan 10, 1987		at Dartmouth	W 94–74	2–7 (1–1)	Leede Arena; Hanover, New Hampshire
Jan 13, 1987*		Saint Francis (PA)	W 94–85	3–7	The Palestra; Philadelphia, Pennsylvania
Jan 20, 1987*		Lafayette	W 80–64	4–7	The Palestra; Philadelphia, Pennsylvania
Jan 27, 1987*		vs. Saint Joseph's	L 81–83	4–8	Philadelphia, Pennsylvania
Jan 30, 1987		Yale	L 80–81	4–9 (1–2)	The Palestra (3,152); Philadelphia, Pennsylvania
Jan 31, 1987		Brown	W 98–74	5–9 (2–2)	The Palestra; Philadelphia, Pennsylvania
Feb 3, 1987		at Princeton	W 69–68	6–9 (3–2)	Jadwin Gymnasium; Princeton, New Jersey
Feb 6, 1987		at Cornell	L 74–86	6–10 (3–3)	Barton Hall; Ithaca, New York
Feb 7, 1987		at Columbia	W 79–73	7–10 (4–3)	Levien Gymnasium; New York, New York
Feb 10, 1987*		Villanova	L 60–71	7–11	The Palestra; Philadelphia, Pennsylvania
Feb 13, 1987		Dartmouth	W 88–75	8–11 (5–3)	The Palestra; Philadelphia, Pennsylvania
Feb 14, 1987		Harvard	W 95–79	9–11 (6–3)	The Palestra; Philadelphia, Pennsylvania
Feb 16, 1987*		La Salle	L 72–80	9–12	The Palestra; Philadelphia, Pennsylvania
Feb 20, 1987*		Columbia	W 94–73	10–12 (7–3)	The Palestra; Philadelphia, Pennsylvania
Feb 21, 1987		Cornell	W 93–59	11–12 (8–3)	The Palestra; Philadelphia, Pennsylvania
Feb 24, 1987		Princeton	L 59–63	11–13 (8–4)	The Palestra; Philadelphia, Pennsylvania
Feb 27, 1987		at Brown	W 95–92	12–13 (9–4)	Marvel Gymnasium; Providence, Rhode Island
Feb 28, 1987		at Yale	W 78–74	13–13 (10–4)	Payne Whitney Gymnasium (1,178); New Haven, Connecticut
NCAA Tournament
Mar 12, 1987*	(16 E)	vs. (1 E) No. 2 North Carolina; First Round	L 82–113	13–14	Charlotte Coliseum; Charlotte, North Carolina
*Non-conference game. ^{#}Rankings from AP Poll. (#) Tournament seedings in parentheses. E=East. All times are in Eastern Time.

== Awards and honors ==
- Perry Bromwell – Ivy League Player of the Year
