= 1986–87 Yale Bulldogs men's basketball team =

American college basketball season

1986–87 Yale Bulldogs men's basketball
- Conference: Ivy League
- Record: 14–12 (7–7 Ivy)
- Head coach: Dick Kuchen (1st season)
- Assistant coaches: Mike Mucci; Tim O'Shea
- Captain: Ken Wheeler
- Home arena: John J. Lee Amphitheater

1986–87 Ivy League men's basketball standings
	Conf.				Overall
Team	W		L	PCT	W		L	PCT
Penn	10	–	4	.714	13	–	14	.481
Princeton	9	–	5	.643	16	–	9	.640
Cornell	9	–	5	.643	15	–	11	.577
Dartmouth	7	–	7	.500	15	–	11	.577
Yale	7	–	7	.500	14	–	12	.538
Columbia	6	–	8	.429	12	–	14	.462
Harvard	4	–	10	.286	9	–	17	.346
Brown	4	–	10	.286	9	–	18	.333
Rankings from AP Poll

The 1986–87 Yale Bulldogs men's basketball team represented the Yale University during the 1986–87 NCAA Division I men's basketball season. The Bulldogs, led by 1st year head coach Dick Kuchen, played their home games at John J. Lee Amphitheater of the Payne Whitney Gymnasium and were members of the Ivy League. They finished the season 14–12, 7–7 in Ivy League play to tied for fourth place.

== Roster ==
1986–87 Yale Bulldogs men's basketball team
Players
Coaches

Pos.	#	Name	Height	Weight	Year	Hometown
G/F	5	Jesse Washington	6 ft 4 in (1.93 m)	200 lb (91 kg)	Fr	Poughkeepsie, New York
G	10	Val Carlotti	5 ft 10 in (1.78 m)	165 lb (75 kg)	Jr	Bronx, New York
G/F	11	Ken Wheeler	6 ft 2 in (1.88 m)	165 lb (75 kg)	Sr	Springfield Gardens, New York
G	12	Peter White	5 ft 10 in (1.78 m)	160 lb (73 kg)	Jr	Williamsport, Pennsylvania
G	14	John Rice	6 ft 3 in (1.91 m)	185 lb (84 kg)	Jr	Washington, D.C.
C	15	Chris Dudley	6 ft 10 in (2.08 m)	235 lb (107 kg)	Sr	Solana Beach, California
F	21	Eric Mitchell	6 ft 6 in (1.98 m)	205 lb (93 kg)	Jr	Chevy Chase, Maryland
F	22	Michael McMahon	6 ft 5 in (1.96 m)	216 lb (98 kg)	So	West Haven, Connecticut
F	24	Paul Maley	6 ft 7 in (2.01 m)	210 lb (95 kg)	Jr	Los Alamos, New Mexico
F	32	Chad Ludington	6 ft 8 in (2.03 m)	220 lb (100 kg)	Sr	Chapel Hill, North Carolina
G/F	34	Matt Whitehead	6 ft 4 in (1.93 m)	200 lb (91 kg)	Jr	Stamford, Connecticut
F	44	Brian Kasbar	6 ft 7 in (2.01 m)	240 lb (109 kg)	Jr	Summit, New Jersey
F	45	Arthur Mann	6 ft 4 in (1.93 m)	200 lb (91 kg)	So	Lancaster, Pennsylvania

Head coach

- Dick Kuchen

Assistant coach(es)

- Mike Mucci
- Tim O'Shea

Legend

- (C) Team captain
- (S) Suspended
- (I) Ineligible
- (W) Walk-on
- Injured
- Current redshirt

Roster

== Schedule ==
Date time, TV	Rank^{#}	Opponent^{#}	Result	Record	Site (attendance) city, state
Non-conference regular season
Nov 29, 1986*		at Vermont	W 82–80	1–0	Patrick Gym (935); Burlington, Vermont
Dec 2, 1986*		Connecticut	W 77–75 ^{OT}	2–0	Payne Whitney Gymnasium (1,079); New Haven, Connecticut
Dec 5, 1986*		at No. 10 Navy	L 63–92	2–1	Halsey Field House (3,700); Annapolis, Maryland
Dec 8, 1986*		Manhattanville	W 90–81	3–1	Payne Whitney Gymnasium (336); New Haven, Connecticut
Dec 9, 1986*		New Hampshire	W 76–62	4–1	Payne Whitney Gymnasium (417); New Haven, Connecticut
Dec 29, 1986*		vs. Miami (FL); Hurricane Classic	L 75–78 ^{OT}	4–2	(3,500); Miami, Florida
Dec 30, 1986*		vs. Massachusetts; Hurricane Classic	W 62–59	5–2	(3,500); Miami, Florida
Jan 4, 1987*		Notre Dame	L 49–64	5–3	New Haven Coliseum (3,423); New Haven, Connecticut
Jan 7, 1987*		at Holy Cross	L 67–68	5–4	Hart Center (976); Worcester, Massachusetts
Ivy League regular season
Jan 10, 1987		Brown	W 83–79	6–4 (1–0)	Payne Whitney Gymnasium (450); New Haven, Connecticut
Jan 12, 1987*		Lafayette	W 69–63	7–4	Payne Whitney Gymnasium (650); New Haven, Connecticut
Jan 16, 1987		Cornell	L 87–93	7–5 (1–1)	Payne Whitney Gymnasium (877); New Haven, Connecticut
Jan 17, 1987		Columbia	W 76–66	8–5 (2–1)	Payne Whitney Gymnasium (726); New Haven, Connecticut
Jan 24, 1987		at Brown	L 72–76	8–6 (2–2)	Marvel Gymnasium; Providence, Rhode Island
Jan 27, 1987*		at Fairfield	L 81–86 ^{OT}	8–7	Alumni Hall (2,718); Fairfield, Connecticut
Jan 30, 1987		at Penn	W 81–80	9–7 (3–2)	The Palestra (3,152); Philadelphia, Pennsylvania
Jan 31, 1987		at Princeton	W 62–50	10–7 (4–2)	Jadwin Gymnasium; Princeton, New Jersey
Feb 6, 1987		Dartmouth	W 89–71	11–7 (5–2)	Payne Whitney Gymnasium (1,013); New Haven, Connecticut
Feb 7, 1987		Harvard	W 106–95	12–7 (6–2)	Payne Whitney Gymnasium; New Haven, Connecticut
Feb 10, 1987*		at Army	W 72–64	13–7	Christl Arena (727); West Point, New York
Feb 13, 1987		at Columbia	L 72–81	13–8 (6–3)	Levien Gymnasium (1,157); New York, New York
Feb 14, 1987		at Cornell	L 74–86	13–9 (6–4)	Barton Hall (5,100); Ithaca, New York
Feb 21, 1987		at Harvard	W 88–76	14–9 (7–4)	Lavietes Pavilion; Cambridge, Massachusetts
Feb 22, 1987		at Dartmouth	L 83–89	14–10 (7–5)	Leede Arena; Hanover, New Hampshire
Feb 27, 1987		Princeton	L 64–67	14–11 (7–6)	Payne Whitney Gymnasium (735); New Haven, Connecticut
Feb 28, 1987		Penn	L 74–78	14–12 (7–7)	Payne Whitney Gymnasium (1,178); New Haven, Connecticut
*Non-conference game. ^{#}Rankings from AP Poll. (#) Tournament seedings in parentheses. All times are in Eastern Time.
