= 1962–63 Princeton Tigers men's basketball team =

American college basketball season

1962–63 Princeton Tigers men's basketball
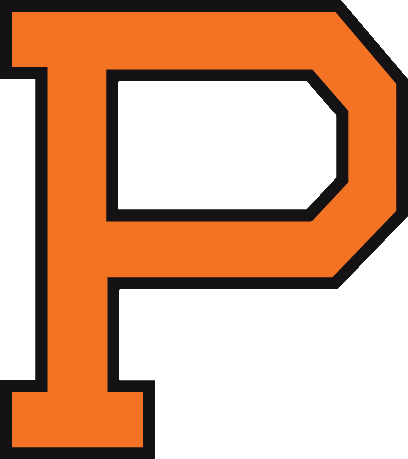

Ivy League Champions

Ivy League one-game playoff, Won 1963 NCAA Division I men's basketball tournament, Lost first round
- Conference: Ivy League
- Record: 19–6 (12–3, 1st-t Ivy)
- Head coach: Butch van Breda Kolff
- Captain: Art Hyland
- Home arena: Dillon Gymnasium

The 1962–63 Princeton Tigers men's basketball team represented Princeton University in intercollegiate college basketball during the 1962–63 NCAA University Division men's basketball season. Butch van Breda Kolff served as head coach and the team captain was Art Hyland. The team played its home games in the Dillon Gymnasium in Princeton, New Jersey. The team was the champion of the Ivy League, earning an invitation to the 25-team 1963 NCAA Division I men's basketball tournament.

The team posted a 19–6 overall record and a 12–3 conference record. After ending the regular season tied for the conference lead, the team won a one-game playoff against Yale on March 8, 1963, at the Rose Hill Arena at Fordham University in the Bronx, New York, by a 65–53 margin for the Ivy League championship and the automatic invitation to the 1963 NCAA Division I men's basketball tournament. The team lost its NCAA Division I men's basketball tournament East region first round contest against the Saint Joseph's Hawks by an 82–81 margin at The Palestra on March 11, 1963. Bradley set the current NCAA Division I men's basketball tournament record for free throws made in 100% effort (16) against St. Joseph's. That continues to be the second best perfect free throw shooting night in Ivy League history. Although the Princeton record book credits Bradley with a 21 for 21 night on January 19, 1963, against Cornell, the Ivy League record book only recognizes one performance better than Bradley's 16 free throw effort (John Lee's 21 on December 27, 1957).

Bill Bradley, who for the first of three consecutive seasons led the conference in scoring with a 27.5 points per game average in conference games, and Art Hyland were both first team All-Ivy League selections. In addition, Bradley was a 1963 NCAA Men's Basketball All-American selection by numerous panels: First team (Sporting News, Helms Foundation), Second team (Associated Press, United Press International, Look, Converse, NEA), Third team (National Association of Basketball Coaches). Bradley would become the school's only three-time All-American two years later. Bradley also led the conference in rebounding with a 13.6 average, while Hyland led the conference in field goal percentage with a 48.2%.
