= 1986–87 Princeton Tigers men's basketball team =

American college basketball season

1986–87 Princeton Tigers men's basketball
- Conference: Ivy League
- Record: 16–9 (9–5, 2nd Ivy)
- Head coach: Pete Carril (20th season)
- Captain: Joe Scott
- Home arena: Jadwin Gymnasium

1986–87 Ivy League men's basketball standings
	Conf.				Overall
Team	W		L	PCT	W		L	PCT
Penn	10	–	4	.714	13	–	14	.481
Princeton	9	–	5	.643	16	–	9	.640
Cornell	9	–	5	.643	15	–	11	.577
Dartmouth	7	–	7	.500	15	–	11	.577
Yale	7	–	7	.500	14	–	12	.538
Columbia	6	–	8	.429	12	–	14	.462
Harvard	4	–	10	.286	9	–	17	.346
Brown	4	–	10	.286	9	–	18	.333
Rankings from AP Poll

The 1986–87 Princeton Tigers men's basketball team represented Princeton University in intercollegiate college basketball during the 1986–87 NCAA Division I men's basketball season. The head coach was Pete Carril and the team captain was Joe Scott. The team played its home games in the Jadwin Gymnasium on the University campus in Princeton, New Jersey. The team finished second in the Ivy League, earning no postseason invitation to either the 1987 NCAA Men's Division I Basketball Tournament or the 1987 National Invitation Tournament. The team won its last five games to finish the season with a 16–9 overall record and a 9–5 conference record. However, they finished one game behind a 10–4 Penn Quaker team in the conference race.

The team was led by second team All-Ivy League selection Scott and Alan Williams. Although the previous teams of 1983, 1984 and 1986 as well as subsequent teams of 1989–2000 would highlight defense and lead the nation in scoring defense, this team and the subsequent 1998 team highlighted the effective shooting of the Princeton offense. Williams led the nation as the statistical champion in field goal percentage with a 70.3% average on 163 baskets on 232 attempts. Meanwhile, the team led the nation in the same category with a 54.1% on 601 out of 1111 shooting. Williams 70.3% field goal percentage in all games continues to stand as an Ivy League single-season record, and his 67.4% mark in conference games made him the conference's official statistical champion.
