= 1987–88 Princeton Tigers men's basketball team =

American college basketball season

1987–88 Princeton Tigers men's basketball
- Conference: Ivy League
- Record: 17–9 (9–5, 3rd Ivy)
- Head coach: Pete Carril (21st season)
- Captains: John Thompson III; Dave Orlandini
- Home arena: Jadwin Gymnasium

1987–88 Ivy League men's basketball standings
	Conf.				Overall
Team	W		L	PCT	W		L	PCT
Cornell	11	–	3	.786	17	–	10	.630
Dartmouth	10	–	4	.714	18	–	8	.692
Princeton	9	–	5	.643	17	–	9	.654
Yale	8	–	6	.571	12	–	14	.462
Penn	8	–	6	.571	10	–	16	.385
Harvard	6	–	8	.429	11	–	15	.423
Brown	2	–	12	.143	6	–	20	.231
Columbia	2	–	12	.143	6	–	20	.231
Rankings from AP Poll

The 1987–88 Princeton Tigers men's basketball team represented Princeton University in intercollegiate college basketball during the 1987–88 NCAA Division I men's basketball season. The head coach was Pete Carril and the team captain was John Thompson III. The team played its home games in the Jadwin Gymnasium on the University campus in Princeton, New Jersey. The team finished third in the Ivy League, earning no postseason invitation to either the 1988 NCAA Men's Division I Basketball Tournament or the 1988 National Invitation Tournament. The team posted a 17–9 overall record and a 9–5 conference record.

The team was led by first team All-Ivy League selection Bob Scrabis. During the season, Bill Bradley was inducted into the College Sports Information Directors of America Academic All-America Hall of Fame. Using the Princeton offense, the team set the current National Collegiate Athletic Association Division I single-season three-point field goal field goal percentage record (minimum 200 made) with 49.2% shooting (211 of 429). In addition to leading the nation in three-point field goal percentage, the team led the nation in three-point field goals made per game (8.12). The subsequent twelve consecutive teams would highlight defense and lead the nation.

That season Princeton established Ivy League standards for career, single-season and single-game three-point field goal shooting. Dave Orlandini (51.3%) and Tim Neff (51.2%) ended their careers with what continue to be the two highest career three-point field goal percentages in Ivy League history. Orlandini also posted the current single-season record with 54.5% shooting. In addition, On December 16, 1987, against the Seton Hall Pirates, Orlandini made all five of his three-point attempts, which set the Ivy League single-game record for most made without a miss. Scrabis matched this record on March 4, 1988, against Columbia. These stood as unsurpassed as the Ivy League record until future Princeton Tigers head coach Sydney Johnson made all six for Princeton on February 28, 1997, but Orlandini's performance continues to be the league record for non-conference games. In addition, Kit Mueller shot 58.9% on his field goals to earn the first of three Ivy League statistical championships for field goal percentage.

== Schedule and results ==
Date time, TV	Rank^{#}	Opponent^{#}	Result	Record	Site city, state
Non-conference regular season
Nov, 1987*		Franklin & Marshall College	W 62–47	1–0	Jadwin Gymnasium (657); Princeton, NJ
Dec 2, 1987*		La Salle	L 62–63	1–1	Jadwin Gymnasium (1,100); Princeton, NJ
Dec 5, 1987*		Rutgers	W 69–49	2–1	Jadwin Gymnasium (1,375); Princeton, NJ
Dec 9, 1987*		Lehigh	W 95–82	3–1	Jadwin Gymnasium (991); Princeton, NJ
Dec 12, 1987*		at Utah	L 55–59	3–2	Jon M. Huntsman Center (10,017); Salt Lake City, UT
Dec 15, 1987*		Seton Hall	W 61–59	4–2	Jadwin Gymnasium (1,521); Princeton, NJ
Dec 19, 1987*		at Davidson	L 45–47	4–3	Johnston Gym (1,886); Davidson, North Carolina
Dec 28, 1987*		vs. San Francisco; Connecticut Mutual Classic	W 62–42	5–3	Hartford Civic Center (12,103); Hartford, Connecticut
Dec 29, 1987*		vs. Connecticut; Connecticut Mutual Classic	L 46–49	5–4	Hartford Civic Center (10,839); Hartford, Connecticut
Jan 5, 1988*		Delaware	W 78–63	6–4	Jadwin Gymnasium (464); Princeton, NJ
Jan 9, 1988*		at Fordham	W 66–59	7–4	Rose Hill Gymnasium (6,573); Bronx, New York
Jan , 1988*		Washington & Jefferson	W 82–44	8–4	Jadwin Gymnasium; Princeton, NJ
Ivy League
Jan 25, 1988		Brown	W 72–60	9–4 (1–0)	Jadwin Gymnasium (1,368); Princeton, NJ
Jan 30, 1988		Yale	W 52–46	10–4 (2–0)	Jadwin Gymnasium (2,135); Princeton, NJ
Feb 5, 1988		at Cornell	L 55–60	10–5 (2–1)	Barton Hall (2,500); Ithaca, New York
Feb 6, 1988		at Columbia	W 69–47	11–5 (3–1)	Levien Gymnasium (1,745); New York, New York
Feb 9, 1988		at Pennsylvania	W 60–57	12–5 (4–1)	Palestra (6,297); Philadelphia, Pennsylvania
Feb 12, 1988		Dartmouth	W 66–43	13–5 (5–1)	Jadwin Gymnasium (4,127); Princeton, NJ
Feb 13, 1988		Harvard	L 51–52	13–6 (5–2)	Jadwin Gymnasium (2,427); Princeton, NJ
Feb 19, 1988		at Yale	L 60–61	13–7 (5–3)	Payne Whitney Gymnasium (1,230); New Haven, Connecticut
Feb 20, 1988		at Brown	L 67–68	13–8 (5–4)	Marvel Gymnasium (623); Providence, Rhode Island
Feb 26, 1988		at Harvard	W 59–54	14–8 (6–4)	Lavietes Pavilion (1,200); Boston, Massachusetts
Feb 27, 1988		at Dartmouth	L 67–79	14–9 (6–5)	Leede Arena (2,120); Hanover, New Hampshire
Mar 1, 1988		Pennsylvania	W 67–65	15–9 (7–5)	Jadwin Gymnasium; Princeton, NJ
Mar 4, 1988		Columbia	W 73–52	16–9 (8–5)	Jadwin Gymnasium; Princeton, NJ
Mar 5, 1988		Cornell	W 79–58	17–9 (9–5)	Jadwin Gymnasium; Princeton, NJ
*Non-conference game. ^{#}Rankings from AP Poll. (#) Tournament seedings in parentheses. E=East. All times are in Eastern Time.
