= 1997–98 Princeton Tigers men's basketball team =

American college basketball season

1997–98 Princeton Tigers men's basketball

Undefeated Ivy League Champion Coaches vs. Cancer Classic Champion

1998 NCAA Men's Division I Tournament, Five Seed, Regional quarterfinals
- Conference: Ivy League

Ranking
- Coaches: No. 16
- AP: No. 8
- Record: 27–2 (14–0, 1st Ivy)
- Head coach: Bill Carmody (2nd season)
- Captains: Steve Goodrich; Mitch Henderson
- Home arena: Jadwin Gymnasium

1997–98 Ivy League men's basketball standings
	Conf.				Overall
Team	W		L	PCT	W		L	PCT
No. 8 Princeton	14	–	0	1.000	27	–	2	.931
Penn	10	–	4	.714	17	–	12	.586
Yale	7	–	7	.500	12	–	14	.462
Harvard	6	–	8	.429	13	–	13	.500
Columbia	6	–	8	.429	11	–	15	.423
Cornell	6	–	8	.429	9	–	17	.346
Dartmouth	4	–	10	.286	7	–	19	.269
Brown	3	–	11	.214	6	–	20	.231
Rankings from AP Poll

The 1997–98 Princeton Tigers men's basketball team represented Princeton University in intercollegiate college basketball during the 1997–98 NCAA Division I men's basketball season. The head coach was Bill Carmody and the team co-captains were Steve Goodrich and Mitch Henderson. The team played its home games in the Jadwin Gymnasium on the University campus in Princeton, New Jersey, and was the repeat undefeated champion of the Ivy League, which earned them an invitation to the 64-team 1998 NCAA Division I men's basketball tournament where they were seeded fifth in the East Region and advanced to the second round. Over the course of the season, the team achieved the highest winning percentage in the nation (93.1%, 27–2). It also established the current school record of 20 consecutive wins surpassing the 19-game streak achieved twice, including the prior season.

Using the Princeton offense, the team posted a 27–2 overall record and a 14–0 conference record. The team entered the tournament on a 19-game winning streak. In a March 12, 1998 NCAA Division I men's basketball tournament East Regional first round game at the Hartford Civic Center in Hartford, Connecticut, the fifth-seeded Tigers defeated UNLV Runnin' Rebels 69–57. Then two days later in the second round the team lost to the Michigan State Spartans 63–56.

The team's season-opening 62–56 win against Texas in the Coaches vs. Cancer Classic on November 11, 1997, was the team's last win against a ranked opponent until the 2011–12 team defeated Harvard on February 11, 2012. During the season, the team entered the fourth Associated Press Top Twenty-five Poll (for the week of December 2) ranked twenty-fifth and climbed steadily each week until it ended the season ranked eighth. The team also finished the season ranked eighth in the final USAToday/NABC Coaches Poll.

The team was led by first team All-Ivy League selections Goodrich and Gabe Lewullis. Goodrich, who finished second in the conference in scoring with a 16.1 average in conference games, earned the Ivy League Men's Basketball Player of the Year award as well as second team Academic All-American recognition from College Sports Information Directors of America. Goodrich was also a 1998 NCAA Men's Basketball All-American honorable mention selection by the Associated Press. With two first team selections and two second team selections (Brian Earl & Mitch Henderson), this was the fourth team (and third Princeton team) to have four first and second team selections.

The team won the tenth of twelve consecutive national statistical championships in scoring defense with a 51.4 points allowed average. The team also led the nation in assist-turnover ratio (1.63) and fewest turnovers per game (10.14). The assist-to-turnover ration was a national record that lasted until 2005. The team continues to be a contributor to the national record for combined single-game three-point field goal shooting percentage (72.4%, minimum 20 made) stemming from a February 20, 1998, contest in which they made 12 of 15 attempts, while Brown made 9 of 14 attempts. Two-time defending Ivy League field goal percentage statistical champion Goodrich was unable to repeat a third time, but instead he won the three-point field goal shooting percentage title with a 51.4% average.

== Schedule and results ==
The team posted a 27–2 (14–0 Ivy League) record.

Date time, TV	Rank^{#}	Opponent^{#}	Result	Record	Site city, state
Regular season
Nov 11, 1997*		vs. No. 22 Texas; Coaches vs. Cancer Classic	W 62–56	1–0	Continental Airlines Arena; East Rutherford, New Jersey
Nov 12, 1997*		vs. NC State; Coaches vs. Cancer Classic	W 38–36	2–0	Continental Airlines Arena; East Rutherford, New Jersey
Nov 22, 1997*		at Rutgers	W 64–52	3–0	Louis Brown Athletic Center; Piscataway, New Jersey
Nov 25, 1997*		Monmouth	W 61–38	4–0	Jadwin Gymnasium; Princeton, New Jersey
Dec 3, 1997*	No. 25	UNC Wilmington	W 63–50	5–0	Jadwin Gymnasium; Princeton, New Jersey
Dec 6, 1997*	No. 25	Lafayette	W 73–48	6–0	Jadwin Gymnasium; Princeton, New Jersey
Dec 9, 1997*	No. 22	at Bucknell	W 64–52	7–0	Davis Gym; Lewisburg, Pennsylvania
Dec 13, 1997*	No. 22	at No. 2 North Carolina	L 42–50	7–1	Dean Smith Center; Chapel Hill, North Carolina
Dec 19, 1997*	No. 19	vs. No. 23 Wake Forest; Jimmy V Classic	W 69–64	8–1	Continental Airlines Arena; East Rutherford, New Jersey
Dec 26, 1997*	No. 18	vs. Drexel; ECAC Holiday Festival	W 58–56	9–1	Madison Square Garden; New York, New York
Dec 27, 1997*	No. 18	vs. Niagara; ECAC Holiday Festival	W 61–52	10–1	Madison Square Garden; New York, New York
Jan 3, 1998*	No. 17	Manhattan	W 77–48	11–1	Jadwin Gymnasium; Princeton, New Jersey
Jan 9, 1998	No. 15	at Yale	W 69–58	12–1 (1–0)	John J. Lee Amphitheater; New Haven, Connecticut
Jan 10, 1998	No. 15	at Brown	W 69–38	13–1 (2–0)	Pizzitola Sports Center; Providence, Rhode Island
Jan 16, 1998*	No. 11	College of New Jersey	W 59–50	14–1	Jadwin Gymnasium; Princeton, New Jersey
Jan 30, 1998*	No. 11	Cornell	W 86–61	15–1 (3–0)	Jadwin Gymnasium; Princeton, New Jersey
Jan 31, 1998	No. 11	Columbia	W 58–45	16–1 (4–0)	Jadwin Gymnasium; Princeton, New Jersey
Feb 6, 1998	No. 11	at Dartmouth	W 71–39	17–1 (5–0)	Leede Arena; Hanover, New Hampshire
Feb 7, 1998	No. 11	at Harvard	W 76–48	18–1 (6–0)	Lavietes Pavilion; Cambridge, Massachusetts
Feb 13, 1998	No. 10	Brown	W 82–58	19–1 (7–0)	Jadwin Gymnasium; Princeton, New Jersey
Feb 14, 1998	No. 10	Yale	W 78–48	20–1 (8–0)	Jadwin Gymnasium; Princeton, New Jersey
Feb 17, 1998	No. 9	Penn	W 71–52	21–1 (9–0)	Jadwin Gymnasium; Princeton, New Jersey
Feb 20, 1998	No. 9	Harvard	W 77–55	22–1 (10–0)	Jadwin Gymnasium; Princeton, New Jersey
Feb 21, 1998	No. 9	Dartmouth	W 74–53	23–1 (11–0)	Jadwin Gymnasium; Princeton, New Jersey
Feb 27, 1998	No. 9	at Columbia	W 51–37	24–1 (12–0)	Levien Gymnasium; New York, New York
Feb 28, 1998	No. 9	at Cornell	W 72–59	25–1 (13–0)	Newman Arena; Ithaca, New York
Mar 3, 1998	No. 8	at Penn	W 78–72 ^{OT}	26–1 (14–0)	The Palestra; Philadelphia, Pennsylvania
NCAA tournament
Mar 12, 1998*	(5 E) No. 8	vs. (12 E) UNLV; First round	W 69–57	27–1	Hartford Civic Center; Hartford, Connecticut
Mar 14, 1998*	(5 E) No. 8	vs. (4 E) No. 16 Michigan State; Second round	L 56–63	27–2	Hartford Civic Center; Hartford, Connecticut
*Non-conference game. ^{#}Rankings from AP Poll. (#) Tournament seedings in parentheses.

== Rankings ==
Ranking movement Legend: ██ Increase in ranking. ██ Decrease in ranking.
Poll	Pre	Wk 1	Wk 2	Wk 3	Wk 4	Wk 5	Wk 6	Wk 7	Wk 8	Wk 9	Wk 10	Wk 11	Wk 12	Wk 13	Wk 14	Wk 15	Wk 16	Final
AP	-	-	-	25	22	19	18	17	15	12	11	11	11	10	9	9	8	8

== NCAA tournament ==
The team was seeded fifth and advanced to the second round of the 1998 NCAA Division I men's basketball tournament.

NCAA Tournament

March 12, 1998, in Hartford, Conn.: (5) Princeton 69, (12) UNLV 57
March 14, 1998, in Hartford, Conn.: (4) Michigan State 63, (5) Princeton 56

== Awards and honors ==
- Steve Goodrich
  - Ivy League Men's Basketball Player of the Year
  - First Team All-Ivy League
  - Academic All Ivy
  - Academic All-America, second team
  - 1998 NCAA Men's Basketball All-Americans, Associated Press honorable mention
  - All-East
- Gabe Lewullis
  - First Team All-Ivy League
- Mitch Henderson
  - Second Team All-Ivy League
- James Mastaglio
  - Honorable Mention All-Ivy League
