= Bud Haabestad =

American politician (born 1933)

Chairman of the Pennsylvania Republican Party
- In office 1978–1980
- Preceded by: Dick Filling
- Succeeded by: Martha Bell Schoeninger

Personal details
- Born: May 3, 1933 (age 93) Drexel Hill, Pennsylvania
- Party: Republican
- Education: Princeton University
- Occupation: Businessman; politician
- Basketball career

Personal information
- Listed height: 6 ft 1 in (1.85 m)

Career information
- High school: Upper Darby High School (Drexel Hill, Pennsylvania)
- College: Princeton (1952–1955)
- Position: Guard/Forward
- Number: 12,15

Career history
- 1955–1958: Wilkes-Barre Barons

Career highlights
- 3x B. Franklin Bunn Trophy winner (1953, 1954, 1955); 2x All-Ivy League first team (1954, 1955); Ivy League scoring leader (1954); 2x All-EPBL First Team (1956, 1957)

Harold Franklin Haabestad (born May 3, 1933) is an American politician who was a Delaware County, Pennsylvania councilman and chairman of the Pennsylvania Republican Party. He was a candidate in the 1980 United States Senate election, but lost in the Republican primary to Arlen Specter. A graduate of Princeton University, Haabestad was a record-setting scorer for the Princeton Tigers men's basketball.

== Early life ==
Haabestad was born in Drexel Hill, Pennsylvania on May 3, 1933. His father Harold F. Haabestad Sr., was president of the Hydrol Chemical Company, a manufacturer of embalming chemicals. He was a three-sport athlete at Upper Darby High School, graduating in 1951.

== Princeton University ==
In his first year as a varsity player, Haabestad became the first sophomore to ever lead the Princeton basketball team in scoring and set the school record for most points per game in a season. On February 4, 1953, he broke the school's single game scoring record when he put up 32 points against Colgate. He bested both of those records, averaging an Ivy League high 18.4 point per game and scoring 33 against Iowa. Princeton played for that year's Eastern Intercollegiate Basketball League, title but lost to Cornell. Haabestad averaged 20 points per game as a senior, which was the second highest average in the Ivy League (behind Chet Forte) that season. He became the first player in school history to score 1,000 points in a career. The Tigers beat Columbia to capture the Eastern Intercollegiate Basketball League championship and played in the 1955 NCAA basketball tournament. Haabestad was awarded the B. Franklin Bunn Trophy as Princeton's most valuable player in all three of his varsity seasons. He is the only three-time winner of the award.

From 1955 to 1958, Haabestad played for the Wilkes-Barre Barons of the Eastern Pennsylvania Basketball League. He averaged 19.1 points per game over 61 career games and was a named to the EPBL All-League First Team in 1955–56 and 1956–57.

== Business ==
After graduating, Haabestad served in the United States Navy and worked for Hydrol Chemical, becoming president in 1966. In 1964, he founded Unitex Products, a paper clothing manufacturing company based in Lester, Pennsylvania. Unitex merged with a larger firm five years later. In 1971, he founded TECA Inc., a paper products company. Haabestad remained president of Hydrol Chemical Company until it was acquired by Embalmers Supply Company in 2023.

== Politics ==
Haabestad served on the Delaware County Planning Commission from 1972 to 1974 and was a member of the Radnor Township, Pennsylvania board of commissioners from 1973 to 1977. In 1977, he was elected to the Delaware County council.

In 1978, Haabestad was gubernatorial nominee Dick Thornburgh's handpicked candidate for Republican state committee chairman. He was elected by acclamation after incumbent Dick Filling dropped out agreed to drop out for the sake of party unity. Under his leadership, the party was able to reduce its debt from $400,000 to $100,000. However, many county party leaders were upset with Haabestad due to a lack of patronage jobs in the Thornburgh administration.

In 1980, United States Senator Richard Schweiker unexpectedly announced he would not run for reelection. Because Dick Thornburgh had only been Governor for only a year, he did not want to seek the seat. Arlen Specter sought to succeed Schweiker, but Thornburgh did not support his candidacy because he feared Specter would create "another power center within the party" and was wary of his multiple losses since 1969. When William Scranton III elected not to run, Thornburgh convinced Haabestad to enter the race. Haabestad was also endorsed by U.S. Senator John Heinz and Philadelphia Republican boss William Meehan. Thornburgh and Heniz hoped to have Haabestad nominated by the Republican state committee, but it instead voted to have an open primary. Once the primary was announced, Schweiker endorsed Haabestad over Specter. Although Haabestad was favored by party leaders, Specter had much greater name recognition with voters. Specter defeated Haabestad by about 37,000 votes and beat Democratic nominee Peter F. Flaherty in the general election.

Haabestad did not run for reelection as party chairman in 1980 and was succeeded by Martha Bell Schoeninger, who was seen as an anti-Thornburgh candidate. He also did not seek reelection to the county council, citing his business commitments.
