= Dillon Gymnasium =

Athletic facility in Princeton, New Jersey

Herbert L. Dillon Gymnasium
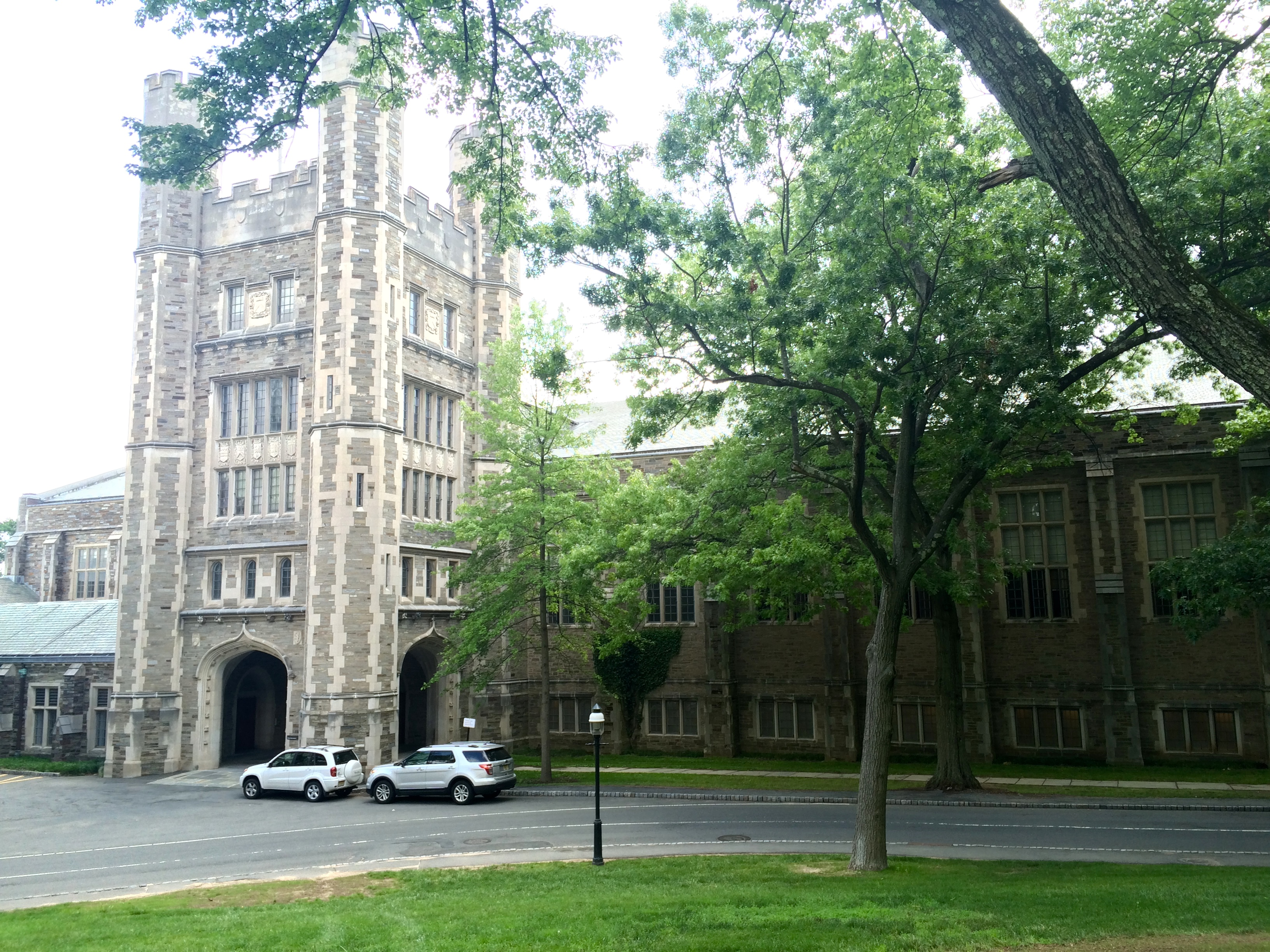
- Interactive map of Herbert L. Dillon Gymnasium
- Location: Princeton University; Princeton, NJ 08542
- Capacity: 1,500 (approximate)

Construction
- Groundbreaking: 1947
- Opened: 1947

Tenants
- Princeton Tigers (Volleyball & wrestling)
- Dillon Gymnasium
- U.S. Historic district – Contributing property
- Location within Mercer County, New Jersey
- Location: Elm Drive, Princeton University, Princeton, NJ
- Coordinates: 40°20′44.1″N 74°39′31.7″W
- Built: 1947
- Architect: Aymar Embury, class of 1900
- Architectural style: Collegiate Gothic
- Part of: Princeton Historic District (ID75001143)
- Designated CP: 27 June 1975

Dillon Gymnasium is an on-campus multi-purpose athletic facility on the campus of Princeton University in Princeton, New Jersey. It was built in 1947 to replace University Gymnasium, which had burned to the ground in 1944. It houses a 1,500-seat gymnasium, squash courts and a pool.

From 1947 to 1969 it housed the men's basketball team before the building of Jadwin Gymnasium. It currently houses the men's and women's volleyball teams and the wrestling team. It is named for Herbert L. Dillon, class of 1907, a one-time football captain and a principal donor to the building which bears his name.

As the headquarters of Princeton University's Campus Recreation program, Dillon is also home to the 8,000-square-foot (740 m^{2}) Stephens Fitness Center, a 1,280-square-foot (119 m^{2}) Dance Studio, a 1,250-square-foot (116 m^{2}) Martial Arts Room, and a Spinning Room with 14 bikes.

On 15 February 1964 Bill Bradley scored 51 points here in a basketball game for Princeton University, allowing Princeton to defeat Harvard University, 87-56, before 2,700 fans.
